= Ohio Northwest Region defunct athletic conferences =

This is a list of former high school athletic conferences in the Northwest Region of Ohio, as designated by the OHSAA. If a conference had members that span multiple regions, the conference is placed in the article of the region most of its former members hail from. Because the names of localities and their corresponding high schools do not always match and because there is often a possibility of ambiguity with respect to either the name of a locality or the name of a high school, the following table gives both in every case, with the locality name first, in plain type, and the high school name second in boldface type. The school's team nickname is given last.

== Auglaize County League ==
- Wapakoneta **Blume** Redskins (192?-29, to Mid-Western League)
- **Buckland** Indians (192?-64, consolidated into Wapakoneta)
- **Cridersville** Rams (192?-64, consolidated into Wapakoneta)
- St. Marys **Memorial** Roughriders (192?-29, to MWL)
- **New Bremen** Cardinals (192?-70, to Wayne)
- **New Knoxville** Rangers (192?-70, to Wayne)
- Wapakoneta **St. Joseph** Saints (192?-70, to Wayne)^{1}
- **Waynesfield-Goshen** Tigers (192?-70, to West Central Ohio Conference)^{2}
1. Concurrent with Wayne 1956-70.
2. Concurrent with Logan County League 1960-70.

== Big Five League ==
- **Bowling Green** Bobcats (1929–31, to Buckeye League 1934)
- Lima **Central** Spartans (1929–31, to Southern Ohio League 1941)
- **Defiance** Bulldogs (1929–31, to Northwest Ohio)
- **Fostoria** Redmen (1929–31, to Buckeye League 1934)
- Lima **South** Tigers (1929–31, to Southern Ohio League 1941)

== Black Fork Valley Conference ==
The all-time members of the Black Fork Valley Conference. (1979–1982) Charter Members

- Ashland **Crestview** Cougars (1979-1982)
- **Lucas** Cubs (1979–1982)
- **Mansfield Christian** Flames (1980-1982, Basketball Only)
- **Plymouth** Big Red (1979–1982)

== Buckeye League/Conference ==
The league was created when Columbian, Fremont Ross, and Sandusky left the Little Big 7 league to join with Bowling Green, Findlay, and Fostoria. When Bowling Green and Fostoria left for the Great Northern League (and Tiffin went to the NOL), the league added two schools from the Lake Erie League and rebranded as the Buckeye Conference. The league ended in 1987 as most schools joined either the Buckeye Central Conference or the Erie Shore League.

- **Bowling Green** Bobcats (1934–54, to Great Northern)
- Tiffin **Columbian** Tornadoes (1934–54, to Northern Ohio)
- **Findlay** Trojans (1934–87, to Buckeye Central)
- **Fostoria** Redmen (1934-35.1939–54, to Great Northern)
- **Fremont Ross** Little Giants (1934–87, to Buckeye Central)
- **Sandusky** Blue Streaks (1934–39, 1954–87, to Erie Shore)
- Tiffin **Junior Order Home** Juniors (1938–43, closed)
- Marion **Harding** Presidents (1947–87, to Ohio Heartland)
- **Elyria** Pioneers (1954–87, to Erie Shore)
- **Lorain** Steelmen (1954–87, to Erie Shore)
- Lorain **Admiral King** Admirals (1962–87, to Erie Shore)
- **Mansfield Senior** Tygers (1962–81, to Ohio Heartland in 1987)

== Crawford County League ==
A small-school county league, the CCL was organized in 1935 and did not have a change in membership until 1958. Nevada joined in 1961, after the Wyandot County League folded, with the CCL only having four remaining schools. Buckeye Central and Colonel Crawford, two recent consolidations, left for the North Central Conference the following year, with the three remaining schools consolidating into Wynford in 1963.

- **Chatfield** Tigers (1935–60, consolidated into Buckeye Central)
- Brokensword **Holmes-Liberty** Pirates (1935–63, consolidated into Wynford)
- **Leesville** Trojans (1935–58, consolidated into North Robinson)
- **Lykens** Panthers (1935–61, consolidated into Holmes-Liberty)
- Monnett **Mount Zion** Bulldogs (1935–63, consolidated into Wynford)
- **New Washington** Indians (1935–60, consolidated into Buckeye Central)
- **North Robinson** Robins (1935–60, consolidated into Colonel Crawford)
- **Sulphur Springs** Yellow Jackets (1935–60, consolidated into Colonel Crawford)
- **Tiro** Tigers (1935–60, consolidated into Buckeye Central)
- New Winchester **Whetstone** Hornets (1935–58, consolidated into North Robinson)
- New Washington **Buckeye Central** Bucks (1960–62, left for North Central Conference)
- North Robinson **Colonel Crawford** Eagles (1960–62, left for Johnny Appleseed Conference (joined in 1961) and North Central Conference)
- **Nevada** Knights (1961–63, consolidated into Wynford)

== Firelands League ==
- **Clyde** Fliers (1934–39)
- **Huron** Tigers (1934–53, to Lakleland Conference)
- Castalia **Margaretta** Polar Bears (1934–53, to Lakleland Conference)
- **Milan** Indians (1934–53, to Huron-Erie League)
- **Monroeville** Eagles (1934–53, to Huron-Erie League)^{1}
- Norwalk **St. Paul** Flyers (1936–53)
- **Berlin Heights** Tigers (1941–53, to Huron-Erie League)
- **New London** Wildcats (1947–53, to Lakleland Conference)^{1}
- **Vermilion** Sailors (1947–53, to Lakleland Conference)
1. Concurrent with Huron County League throughout FL tenure.

== Great Lakes League ==
(1956–2003) The GLL existed from fall of 1956 until spring of 2003 before essentially transforming into the Greater Buckeye Conference. It had been born off of the old Great Northern Conference's Orange Division. The following schools were members at some point:

- **Bowling Green** Bobcats (1956–60, 1969–78, to Northern Lakes)
- Oregon **Clay** Eagles (1956-2003, to Toledo City League)
- **Fostoria** Redmen (1956-2000, to Northern Ohio)
- Sylvania **Northview** Wildcats (1956–96, to Northern Lakes, known as Sylvania until 1978)
- Temperance (MI) **Bedford** Mules (1960-2000, to Southeastern (MI))
- **Port Clinton** Redskins (1963–80, to Sandusky Bay)
- Toledo **Rogers** Rams (1965–67, to Toledo City)
- Toledo **Whitmer** Panthers (1965–69, 1984-2003, to Toledo City)
- **Napoleon** Wildcats (1978–97, 2002–03, to Greater Buckeye)
- Lima **Shawnee** Indians (1980–82, to Western Buckeye)
- **Fremont Ross** Little Giants (1991-2003, to Greater Buckeye)
- **Findlay** Trojans (1995-2003, to Greater Buckeye)
- **Sandusky** Blue Streaks (1997-2003, to Greater Buckeye)
- Lorain **Admiral King** Admirals (2000–02, to Lake Erie)
- Lorain **Southview** Saints (2000–02, to Lake Erie)

== Great Northern Conference ==
(c. 1945-1956)

The Great Northern Conference was created shortly after the end of World War II with the inaugural members of Clay, Maumee, Perrysburg, Rossford, Whitmer, and Sylvania. Anthony Wayne would join in 1953 after recently being consolidated. The GNC eventually added several members in 1956, splitting into a big schools division (Orange Division) and small schools division (Blue Division), both which would later split off into the Great Lakes League and Northern Lakes League, respectively.

- Oregon **Clay** Eagles (1945–1956)
- **Maumee** Panthers (1945–1956)
- **Perrysburg** Yellow Jackets (1945–1956)
- **Rossford** Bulldogs (1945–1956)
- **Sylvania** Wildcats (1945–1956)
- Toledo **Whitmer** Panthers (1945–1956)
- Whitehouse **Anthony Wayne** Generals (1953–1956)

== Greater Buckeye Conference ==
(2003-2011)

- **Findlay** Trojans (joined the Three Rivers Athletic Conference in 2011)
- **Fremont Ross** Little Giants (joined the Three Rivers Athletic Conference in 2011)
- **Lima Senior** Spartans (joined the Three Rivers Athletic Conference in 2011)
- **Marion Harding** Presidents
- **Napoleon** Wildcats (joined the Northern Lakes League in 2011)
- **Sandusky** Blue Streaks (joined the Northern Ohio League in 2011)

== Hardin County League ==
(19??–1964)

- **Alger** Eagles (19??-64, consolidated into Upper Scioto Valley)
- **Dunkirk** Dragons (19??-52, consolidated into Hardin Northern)
- **Forest** Rangers (19??-62, consolidated into Riverdale)
- Dola **Hardin Northern** Polar Bears (19??-64, Dola until 1952, to Blanchard Valley 1965)
- **McGuffey** Rockets (19??-64, consolidated into Upper Scioto Valley)
- **Mt. Victory-Dudley** Green Devils (19??-62, consolidated into Ridgemont)
- **Ridgeway** Tigers (19??-62, consolidated into Ridgemont)
- **Roundhead** Indians (19??-64, consolidated into Upper Scioto Valley)
- **Mt. Blanchard** Purple Hurricanes (1960–62, consolidated into Riverdale)
- **Wharton** Dragons (1960–62, consolidated into Riverdale)

== Huron County League ==
- **Greenwich** Shamrocks (pre-1925-53, to Huron-Erie League)^{1}
- **Monroeville** Eagles (pre-1925-53, to Huron-Erie League)^{2}
- **New Haven** Yellow Jackets (pre-1925-53, to Huron-Erie League)^{1}
- **New London** Wildcats (pre-1925-53, to Lakeland Conference)^{3}
- **North Fairfield** Indians (pre-1925-53, to Huron-Erie League)^{1}
- **Townsend** Tigers (pre-1925-52, consolidated into Townsend-Wakeman)^{4}
- Wakeman **Townsend-Wakeman** Rough Riders (**Wakeman** before 1952, pre-1925-53, to Huron-Erie League)^{4}
1. Concurrent with Twin Valley League pre-1936-41.
2. Concurrent with Firelands League 1934-53.
3. Concurrent with Northern Ohio Athletic League 1927-47, then Firelands League 1947-53.
4. Concurrent with Good Neighbors League pre-1936-41).

== Huron-Erie League ==
This conference, the direct precursor to the Firelands Conference, was formed in 1953, as the Huron County League merged with two Erie County members of the old Firelands League, causing the remaining members to form the Lakeland Conference. With four members (and one new consolidation) remaining, the league dissolved and found new members to form the FC.

see Huron-Erie League Standings

- **Berlin Heights** Tigers (1953-1960) (to Firelands Conference)
- **Greenwich** Shamrocks (1953-1960) (consolidated into South Central)
- **Milan** Indians (1953-1960) (to Firelands Conference)
- **Monroeville** Eagles (1953-1960) (to Firelands Conference)
- **New Haven** Yellow Jackets (1953-1957) (consolidated into Huron Valley)
- **North Fairfield** Indians (1953-1960) (consolidated into South Central)
- Plymouth **Huron Valley** Pilgrims (1957–58) (State voided consolidation in Feb. 1958. Plymouth retained school, New Haven consolidated with Willard)
- Collins **Western Reserve** Rough Riders(1953-1960) (Wakeman **Townsend-Wakeman** before 1959, to Firelands Conference)

== Interurban Athletic League ==
- Lima **Bath** Wildcats (1909-1914)
- St. Mary's **Memorial** Roughriders (1909-1914)
- **Minster** Wildcats (1909-1914)
- **New Bremen** Cardinals (1909-1914)
- **Piqua** Indians (1909-1914) (now in SW region)
- **Sidney** Yellow Jackets (1909-1914) (Now in SW region)
- Delphos **St. John's** Blue Jays (1909-1914)
- **Troy** Trojans (1909-1914) (now in SW region)
- **Versailles** Tigers (1909-1914)
- **Wapakoneta** Redskins (1909-1914)

== Johnny Appleseed Conference ==
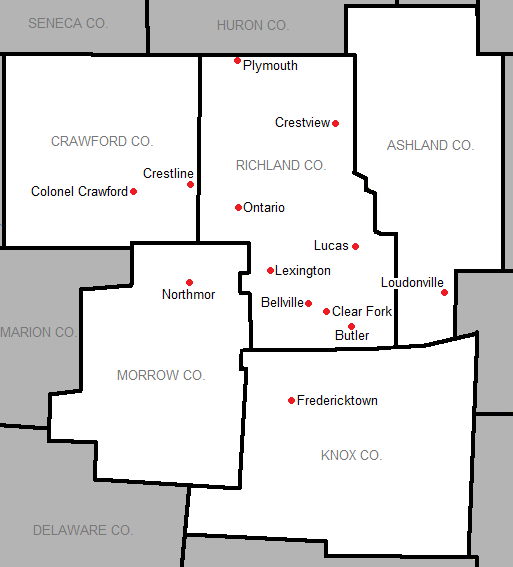

The all-time members of the Johnny Appleseed Conference.

- **Bellville** Blue Jays (1962–1963)
- **Butler** Bulldogs (1962–1963)
- North Robinson **Colonel Crawford** Eagles (1962–1963)
- **Crestline** Bulldogs (1962–1977)
- **Fredericktown** Freddies (1962–1977)
- **Lexington** Minutemen (1962–1980, football 1965-1980)
- **Loudonville** Redbirds (1962–1980)
- **Ontario** Warriors (1962–1980)
- **Plymouth** Big Red (1962–1979)
- Bellville **Clear Fork** Colts (Consolidation of Bellville and Butler, 1963–1980)
- Galion **Northmor** Golden Knights (1964–1967)
- Ashland **Crestview** Cougars (1965–1979)
- **Lucas** Cubs (1965–1967)

== Lakeshore Conference ==
(1963–1972; 1979–1985) The Lakeshore Conference were two separate leagues made-up of schools that were in both loops. The original conference was formed in 1963 and folded in 1972 when four of its six members left. The second Lakeshore Conference came into existence around 1979 and folded after the 1985 football season.

First Version

- **Danbury** Lakers (1963–72)
- **Green Springs** Bobcats (1963–69, consolidated into Clyde)
- **Elmore** Bulldogs (1963–68, consolidated into Woodmore)
- **Northwood** Rangers (1963–72, to Michigan-Ohio Border Conference)
- Rudolph **Westwood** Warriors (1963–66, consolidated into Bowling Green)
- **Woodville** Warriors (1963–68, consolidated Woodmore in 1968)
- **Grand Rapids** Pirates (1967–68, consolidated into Otsego)
- **North Baltimore** Tigers (1969–72)
- Tontogany **Otsego** Knights (1967–72, to Suburban Lakes League)
- **Ottawa Hills** Green Bears (1967–72, to Michigan-Ohio Border Conference)
- Norwalk **St. Paul** Flyers (1967–68)
- **Woodmore** Wildcats (1968–72, to SLL)

Second Version:

- **Danbury** Lakers (1979-fall 85)
- **Hopewell-Loudon** Chieftains (1979-fall 85)
- **North Baltimore** Tigers (1979-fall 85)
- **Northwood** Rangers (1979-fall 85)
- **Ottawa Hills** Green Bears (1979-fall 85)
- **St. Wendelin** Mohawks (1982-fall 85)
- **Seneca East** Tigers (1979-fall 1985)

The league folded after the 1985 football season when Hopewell-Loudon, North Baltimore, St. Wendelin and Seneca East left for the Midland Athletic League. This left Danbury, Northwood, and Ottawa Hills as independents until Northwood joined the Suburban Lakes League in 1986 and the other two joined the Toledo Area Athletic Conference in 1988.

Six Schools Set For New League

== Lake Plains Conference ==
A short-lived triangular league started by independent schools, the conference lasted five years before two of the three schools joined more established leagues.

- **Bowling Green** Bobcats (1964–69, to Great Lakes League)
- Lima **Central Catholic** Thunderbirds (1964–69, to Miami Valley League)
- **Defiance** Bulldogs (1964–69, to Western Buckeye League 1973)

== Little Big League ==
Formed as Northern Ohio League in 1911 and then renamed Little Big 6 after Bellevue and Fremont Ross join in 1912. Renamed Little Big 7 after Oberlin joins in 1921. Elyria and Lorain replaced by Tiffin Columbian and Willard in 1927. Renamed Little Big 5 after Fremont Ross, Sandusky and Tiffin Columbian leave to form Buckeye Conference and are replaced by Port Clinton. Became Little Big 4 once Oberlin moved to the Southwestern League in 1937, most of the league grouped with other schools under the NOL banner in 1944.

- **Elyria** Pioneers^{1} (1911–26, to Lake Erie)
- **Lorain** Steelmen^{1} (1911–26, to Lake Erie)
- **Norwalk** Truckers (1911–44, to Northern Ohio League)
- **Sandusky** Blue Streaks (1911–34, to Buckeye League)
- **Bellevue** Redmen (1912–44, to Northern Ohio League)
- Fremont **Ross** Little Giants (1912–34, to Buckeye League)
- **Oberlin** Indians (1921–37, to Southwestern League)
- Tiffin **Columbian** Tornados (1927–34, to Buckeye League)
- **Willard** Crimson Flashes (1927–44, to Northern Ohio League)
- **Port Clinton** Redskins (1934–44, to Sandusky Bay 1948)
1. Concurrent with Lake Erie League 1923-26.

== Maumee Valley League ==
The MVL began in 1931, as four of the larger schools of the Lucas County League joined with Perrysburg and Rossford, two of their larger neighbors nearby in Wood County. In 1945, all of the schools except for Holland (who jumped from the LCL when Point Place closed) left to join the Great Northern Conference, along with LCL team Oregon Clay. The remaining Lucas County teams merged into the MVL. Three of these schools merged to form Anthony Wayne in 1951. After some changes, the league entered its last leg in 1957, when Delta and Swanton left, leaving four members. Within the next three years, three of the four found other conference homes.

- Sylvania **Burnham** Wildcats (1931–45, left to form Great Northern Conference)
- **Maumee** Panthers (1931–45, left to form Great Northern Conference)
- **Perrysburg** Yellow Jackets (1931–45, left to form Great Northern Conference)
- **Point Place** Pirates (1931–37, school consolidated into Toledo City Schools)
- **Rossford** Bulldogs (1931–45, left to form Great Northern Conference)
- Toledo **Whitmer** Panthers (1931–45, left to form Great Northern Conference)
- **Holland** Blue Zippers (1937–60, became Springfield 1960, joined Northern Lakes League 1962)
- **Delta** Panthers (1945–57, to Northwest Ohio Athletic League)
- **Monclova** Cardinals (1945–51, consolidated into Anthony Wayne)
- **Ottawa Hills** Green Bears (1945–59, to Seaway Conference)
- **Swanton** Bulldogs (1945–57, to Northwest Ohio Athletic League)
- **Waterville** Wildcats (1945–51, consolidated into Anthony Wayne)
- **Whitehouse** Tigers (1945–51, consolidated into Anthony Wayne)
- Whitehouse **Anthony Wayne** Generals (1951–53, left for Great Northern Conference)
- Temperance (MI) **Bedford** Kicking Mules (1952–60, to Great Lakes League)
- **Archbold** Blue Streaks (1953–60, to Northwest Ohio Athletic League)

== Michigan-Ohio Border Conference ==
- **Blissfield** (MI) Royals (1973–77, to Lenawee County Conference (MI))
- **Dundee** (MI) Vikings (1973–1981, to Lenawee County Conference (MI))
- Erie (MI) **Mason** Eagles (1973–1981, to Lenawee County Conference (MI) 1988)
- **Ida** (MI) Bluestreaks (1973–1981, to Lenawee County Conference (MI) 1988)
- **Northwood** Rangers^{1} (1973-1981, to Lakeshore)
- **Ottawa Hills** Green Bears^{1} (1973-1981, to Lakeshore)
- Ottawa Lake (MI) **Whiteford** Bobcats (1973–75, to Tri-County (Southeast MI)
1. Concurrent with Lakeshore 1979-81.

Six Schools Set For New League

== Mid-Western League ==
(1929-1936)

- **Ada** Bulldogs
- **Celina** Bulldogs
- **Kenton** Wildcats
- St. Marys **Memorial** Roughriders
- **Van Wert** Cougars
- **Wapakoneta** Redskins

== Midland Athletic League ==
(1985-2014)

Conference Website: http://www.tiffinohiosports.com/midland_athletic_league.html

- **Bettsville** Bobcats (no football, 1985-2014)
- Bascom **Hopewell-Loudon** Chieftains (1985-2014)
- **New Riegel** Blue Jackets (no football, 1985-2014)
- **North Baltimore** Tigers (1985-2014)
- **Old Fort** Stockaders (no football, 1985-2014)
- Fostoria **St. Wendelin** Mohawks (1985-2014, football 1985-2009)
- Attica **Seneca East** Tigers (1985-2014)
- Tiffin **Calvert** Senecas (1986-2014)
- Fremont **St. Joseph** Crimson Streaks (1986-2014)
- **Carey** Blue Devils (1990-2014)
- Sycamore **Mohawk** Warriors (1990-2014)
- Kansas **Lakota** Raiders (2009-2014)

== North Central Conference (Crawford County area) ==
- New Washington **Buckeye Central** Bucks (1962-2014)
- North Robinson **Colonel Crawford** Eagles (1962-2014)
- Marion **Elgin** Comets (1962–90, Left for the Mid-Ohio Athletic Conference)
- Sycamore **Mohawk** Warriors (1962–90, Left for the Midland Athletic League)
- Marion **Pleasant** Spartans (1962–90, Left for the Mid-Ohio Athletic Conference)
- Morral **Ridgedale** Rockets (1962–90, Left for the Mid-Ohio Athletic Conference)
- Mt. Blanchard **Riverdale** Falcons (1962-2014)
- Caledonia **River Valley** Vikings (1962–90, Left for the Mid-Ohio Athletic Conference)
- **Carey** Blue Devils (1963–90, Left for the Midland Athletic League)
- Bucyrus **Wynford** Royals (1963-2014)
- **Crestline** Bulldogs (1990-2014)
- **Fredericktown** Freddies (1990–99, Left for the Mid-Buckeye Conference)
- **Ontario** Warriors (1990-2013, Left for the Northern Ohio League)
- **Lucas** Cubs (1998-2013, Left for the Mid-Buckeye Conference)
- **Bucyrus** Redmen (2002–14)
- **Galion** Tigers (2011–14)
- **Upper Sandusky** Rams (2011–14)

== Northern Border League ==
see NBL History

- **Archbold** Blue Streaks (1969–1978)
- **Delta** Panthers (1969–1978)
- **Evergreen** Vikings (1969–1978)
- **Liberty Center** Tigers (1969–1978)
- **Montpelier** Locomotives (1969–1978)
- Hamler **Patrick Henry** Patriots (1969–1978)
- **Swanton** Bulldogs (1969–1978)
- **Wauseon** Indians (1969–1978)

Archbold, Liberty Center, Montpelier, and Wauseon were dual members of the NBL and the NWOAL during the league's entire existence. Evergreen was for the first two years of the league's existence until fully staying in the NBL. See NWOAL for the league history.

== Northern Ohio League ==
Note: Six of the remaining NOL members were absorbed by the Sandusky Bay Conference for the 2017-18 school year.

- **Bellevue** Redmen (1944-2017)
- **Bucyrus** Redmen (1944-2002)
- Tiffin **Columbian** Tornadoes (1954-2017)
- **Crestline** Bulldogs (1944–54)
- **Fostoria** Redmen (2002–11)
- **Galion** Tigers (1944-2011)
- **Norwalk** Truckers (1944-2017)
- **Ontario** Warriors (2013-2017)
- **Sandusky** Blue Streaks (2011-2017)
- **Shelby** Whippets (1944-2017)
- **Upper Sandusky** Rams (1944-2011)
- **Willard** Crimson Flashes (1944-2017)

== Northwest Buckeye League ==
(football only)

- **Antwerp** Archers (1971- )
- Convoy **Crestview** Knights (1969–70)
- **Edon** Bombers
- Sherwood **Fairview** Apaches (1969-??)
- **Hicksville** Aces
- West Unity **Hilltop** Cadets (1971- )
- **Payne** Panthers

== Ohio Heartland Conference ==
- **Ashland** Arrows (1987–2003)
- **Lexington** Minutemen (1987–2003)
- Mansfield **Madison Comprehensive** Rams (1987–2003)
- Mansfield **Malabar** Falcons (1987–1989, merged with Mansfield Senior)
- **Mansfield Senior** Tygers (1987–2003)
- Marion **Harding** Presidents (1987–2003)
- **Orrville** Red Riders (1999–2003)
- **Vermilion** Sailors (1999–2003)

Ashland, Lexington, Madison, Mansfield Senior, and Orrville helped to form the Ohio Cardinal Conference in 2003. Vermilion joined the West Shore Conference while Marion Harding left for the Greater Buckeye Conference.

== Ohio Scholastic League ==
(1948-1951)

- **Alliance** Aviators (1948–51
- **Mansfield** Tygers (1948-1951)
- Massillon **Washington** Tigers (1948-1951)
- Canton **McKinley** Bulldogs (1949-1951)
- Toledo **Waite** Indians (1948-1951)
- Warren **Warren G. Harding** Panthers (1948-1951)

The football-only league dissolved in May 1952, prior to the 1952 football season. Distance and low gate receipts were cited as reasons for folding the league. Toledo Waite representatives also mentioned that having to play conference newcomer Toledo Macomber in the Toledo City League would have made it impossible for them to continue playing in both leagues.

An interest in joining the league was expressed by Hamilton, Middletown, Springfield, and Toledo Libbey in 1949, but those schools ultimately decided the travel was too much for them to consider as well.

== Ohio Wrestling League (wrestling only) ==
Disbanded after 2013-2014 season when the Blanchard Valley Conference expanded.

- **Arcadia** Redskins (Blanchard Valley Conference)
- Oregon **Cardinal Stritch** Cardinals (Toledo Area Athletic Conference)
- Mount Cory/Rawson **Cory-Rawson** Hornets (Blanchard Valley Conference)
- **Gibsonburg** Golden Bears (Toledo Area Athletic Conference)
- **McComb** Panthers (Blanchard Valley Conference)
- **Northwood** Rangers (Toledo Area Athletic Conference)
- **Toledo Christian** Eagles (Toledo Area Athletic Conference)
- **Van Buren** Black Knights (Blanchard Valley Conference)

== Richland County League ==
see the Richland County Standings

- **Bellville** Blue Jays (1948-1963)
- **Butler** Bulldogs (1948-1963)
- **Lexington** Minutemen (1948-1963)
- **Lucas** Cubs (1946-1963)
- **Ontario** Warriors (1948-1963)
- **Plymouth** Big Red (1948-1963)
- **Shiloh** Lions (1948-1958, Merged with Plymouth to create Plymouth-Shiloh School District)
- **Union** (1947-1963, Merged with Savannah in 1963 and consolidated in Ashland Crestview in 1964)

== San-Wood League ==
- **Grand Rapids** Pirates (1961/62-1962/63)
- **Green Springs** Bobcats (1961/62-1962/63)
- Maumee Valley Country Day (1961/62-1962/63)
- **Olney/Northwood** (1962/63) (last year of Olney HS, referred to as both names in various media during school year)
- Tontogany **Otsego** Knights (1961/62-1962/63)
- **Woodville** Warriors (1961/62-1962/63)

== Sandusky County League ==
While containing only Sandusky County teams for most of its existence, at one point the conference had members from four different counties. The league disbanded in 1967, as three of its four remaining schools already had ties with the Lakeshore League, starting in 1963.

- **Clyde** Fliers (192?-34, to Firelands League, 1939–49, to Sandusky Bay Conference)
- **Gibsonburg** Golden Bears (192?-48, to Sandusky Bay Conference)
- **Green Springs** Bobcats (192?-67, to Lakeshore League)
- Burgoon **Jackson** Bruins (192?-60, consolidated into Lakota)
- Vickery **Townsend** Trojans (192?-52, consolidated into Margaretta)
- **Woodville** Panthers (192?-67, to Lakeshore League)
- **York** Panthers (192?-67, consolidated into Bellevue)
- **Elmore** Bulldogs (1948–67, to Lakeshore League)
- **Jackson-Liberty** Bullpups (1959–60, consolidated into Lakota)
- **Risingsun** Tigers (1959–60, consolidated into Lakota)

== Sandusky River League ==
All schools in the SRL headed to the Sandusky Bay Conference in 2016.

- Kansas **Lakota** Raiders (2014-2016)
- **New Riegel** Blue Jackets (2014-2016)
- **Old Fort** Stockaders (2014-2016)
- Fremont **St. Joseph (SJCC)** Crimson Streaks (2014-2016)
- Sandusky **St. Mary (SMCC)** Panthers (2014-2016)
- Fostoria **St. Wendelin** Mohawks (2014-2016)

== Seaway Conference ==
- **Elmore** Bulldogs (1959–1963)
- **Gibsonburg** Golden Bears (1959–1963)
- Danbury **Lakeside** Lakers (1959–1963)
- **North Baltimore** Tigers (1959–1967)
- **Ottawa Hills** Green Bears (1959–1967)
- Fostoria **St. Wendelin** Mohawks (1959–1967)
- **Grand Rapids** Pirates (1963-1967)
- Tontogany **Otsego** Knights (1963-1967)

== Seneca County League ==
- Bettsville - (1941-1985) Left for Midland Athletic League
- Bascom Hopewell Loudon - (1941-1985) Left for Midland Athletic League
- New Riegel -(1941-1985) Left for Midland Athletic League
- Old Fort - (1941-1985) Left for Midland Athletic League
- Attica Seneca East - (1941-1985) Left for Midland Athletic League

== Seneca-Sandusky League ==
(1933-???)

- Amsden
- Bettsville
- Burgoon
- Green Springs
- Old Fort

== Suburban Lakes League ==
(1972–2011)

- Pemberville **Eastwood** Eagles (1972-2011, left for Northern Buckeye Conference)
- Bloomdale **Elmwood** Royals (1972-2011, left for Northern Buckeye Conference)
- **Genoa Area** Comets (1972-2011, left for Northern Buckeye Conference)
- **Gibsonburg** Golden Bears (1972-2011, left for the Toledo Area Athletic Conference)
- Kansas **Lakota** Raiders (1972-2009, left for Midland Athletic League)
- **Oak Harbor** Rockets (1972–86, left for Sandusky Bay Conference)
- Tontogany **Otsego** Knights (1972-2011, left for Northern Buckeye Conference)
- Elmore **Woodmore** Wildcats (1972-2011, left for Northern Buckeye Conference)
- **Northwood** Rangers (1986-2000, left for the Toledo Area Athletic Conference)
- Millbury **Lake** Flyers (1996-2011, left for Northern Buckeye Conference)

== Three Rivers Athletic Conference ==
- Toledo **Central Catholic** Fighting Irish (from Toledo City League, 2011-2023)
- Oregon **Clay** Eagles (from TCL, 2011-2023)
- **Findlay** Trojans (from Greater Buckeye Conference, 2011-2023)
- **Fremont Ross** Little Giants (from GBC, 2011-2023)
- **Lima Senior** Spartans (from GBC, 2011-2023)
- Toledo **Notre Dame** Eagles (from TCL, all-girls, 2011-2023)
- Toledo **St. Francis de Sales** Knights (from TCL, 2011-2023)
- Toledo **St. John's Jesuit** Titans (from TCL, 2011-2023)
- Toledo **St. Ursula** Arrows (from TCL, all girls, 2011-2023)
- Toledo **Whitmer** Panthers (from TCL, 2011-2023)

== Trolley League ==
(1919-1921/22?)

- Bowling Green
- Findlay
- Fostoria
- Lima (Central and/or South?)
- Tiffin

== Twin Valley League ==
(1936/37-???)

- Adario
- Greenwich
- New Haven
- North Fairfield
- Plymouth
- Shiloh

== Wood County "B" League ==
The smaller schools in Wood County started to organize into leagues in the early 1930s, originally competing in three separate leagues: the Northern Wood County League, Southeast Wood County League, and Western Wood County League. By 1959, consolidation and schools leaving for other leagues had whittled the three leagues down to two, with the Northern and Southeast leagues combining into the Eastern Wood County League. This would only last for one year, as further consolidation caused a merger into a single league. The league ended in 1963, as the number of schools was whittled to three.

=== Full Membership List ===
- **Bloomdale** Bulldogs (193?-60, Consolidated into Elmwood)
- **Cygnet** Zippers (193?-60, consolidated into Elmwood)
- **Grand Rapids** Pirates (193?-63, to Seaway Conference)
- **Haskins** Hawks (193?-1957/58, consolidated into Otsego)
- Hoytville **Jackson** Knights (193?-60, consolidated into McComb)
- Milbury **Lake** Flyers (193?-60, to Northern Lakes League)
- **Milton Center** Mustangs (193?-56, consolidated into Westwood)
- Wayne **Montgomery** Eagles (193?-1957/58, consolidated into Otsego)
- **North Baltimore** Tigers (193?-63, to Seaway Conference)
- **Olney** Eagles (193?-60, consolidated into Lake. Northwood opens in 1963)
- Tontogany **Otsego** Knights (1958/59-???, to Lakeshore Conference)
- **Pemberville** Redmen (193?-59, consolidated into Eastwood)
- **Portage** Panthers (193?-60, consolidated into Elmwood)
- **Risingsun** Tigers (193?-59, to Sandusky County League)
- Rudolph **Liberty Township** Lions (193?-56, consolidated into Westwood)
- Luckey **Troy-Luckey** Trojans (193?-59, consolidated into Eastwood)
- Tontogany **Washington Township** Indians (193?-1957/58, consolidated into Otsego)
- Scotch Ridge **Webster Township** Scots (193?-59, consolidated into Eastwood)
- **Weston** Warriors (193?-57/58, consolidated into Otsego)
- **Waterville** Beavers (1945–51, from Maumee Valley, consolidated into Anthony Wayne)
- Rudolph **Westwood** Warriors (1956–63, to Lakeshore Conference)

=== League Alignments ===
**1960-63**

WCL
Grand Rapids
Hoytville-Jackson Twp. (closed after 1960/61)
North Baltimore
Northwood (1962/63-???)
Olney (closed after 1961/62)
Otsego
Westwood

**1959-60**

EWCL	WWCL
Bloomdale	Grand Rapids
Cygnet	Haskins
Lake	Jackson
Montgomery	Washington Twp.
Olney	Weston
Portage	Westwood

**Pre-1959**

NWCL	SEWCL	WWCL
Haskins	Bloomdale	Grand Rapids
Lake	Cygnet	Jackson
Olney	Montgomery	Liberty Twp (-56)
Troy-Luckey	Pemberville	Milton Center (-56)
Webster Twp	Portage	North Baltimore
	Risingsun	Washington Twp.
		Weston
		Waterville (45-51)
		Westwood (56-59)

== Wyandot County League ==
A county league for smaller schools that existed before 1939, and folded in 1961.

- Edenville **Eden** Golden Flashes (pre-1939-50, consolidated into Nevada, in 1961, split from Nevada, consolidated into Upper Sandusky)
- **Harpster** Crusaders (pre-1939-61, consolidated into Upper Sandusky)
- **Marseilles** Bulldogs (pre-1939-61, consolidated into Upper Sandusky)
- **McCutchenville** Big Red (pre-1939-58, consolidated into Mohawk)
- **Nevada** Bobcats (pre-1939-61, left for Crawford County League)
- Lovell **Salem** Cornhuskers (pre-1939-61, consolidated into Upper Sandusky)
- **Sycamore** Wildcats (pre-1939-58, consolidated into Mohawk)
- **Wharton Dragons** (pre-1939-60, left for Hardin County League)
- Sycamore **Mohawk** Warriors (1958–60, left for Sandusky Bay Conference)

== See also ==
- Ohio High School Athletic Association
- Ohio High School Athletic Conferences
- OHSAA Northwest Region athletic conferences
