= Toledo City League =

Ohioan high school athletic conference

The Toledo City League is an Ohio High School Athletic Association (OHSAA) high school athletic conference that was formed in 1926 and comprises the six high schools in Toledo that are from Toledo Public Schools, along with one high school from Lima, Ohio.

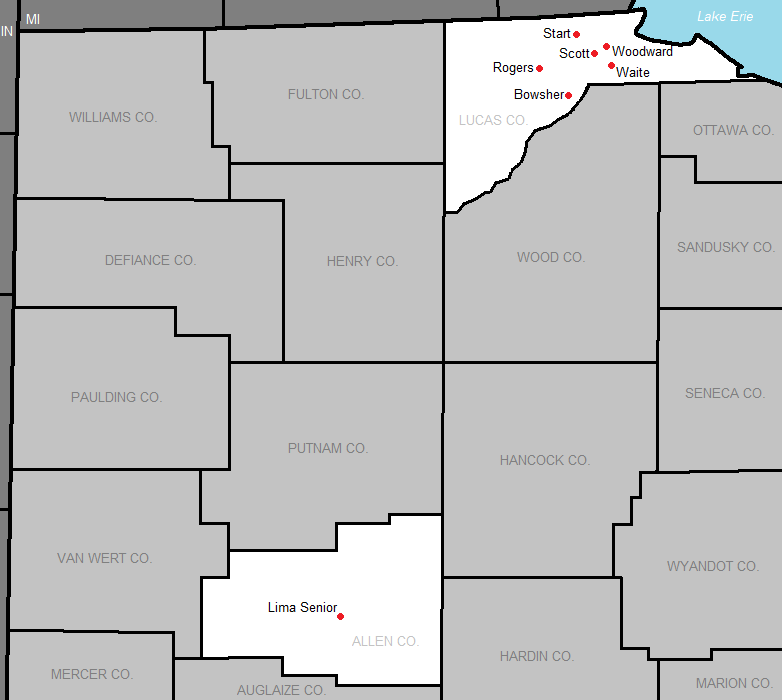
League membership beginning with the 2023-24 school year.

== Membership ==
The current member schools of the conference are:

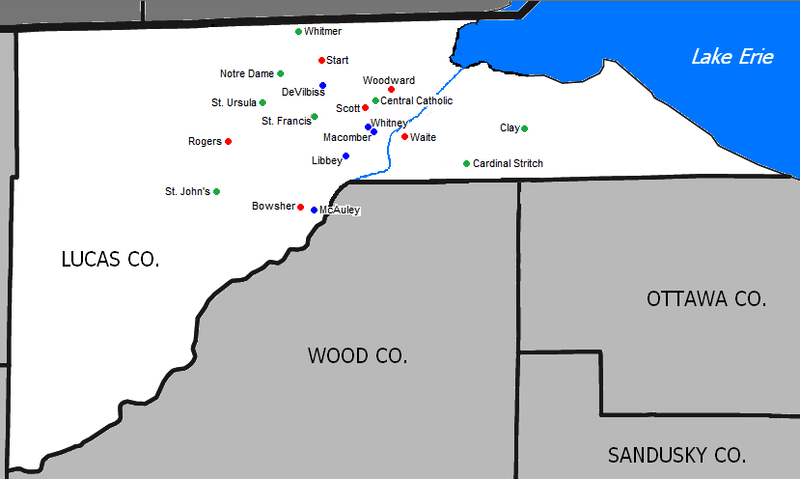
The current member schools of the City League are in red (Lima Senior is not shown). The former members that have been closed are in blue and former members that are in other leagues are in green.

=== Current members ===
| School | Nickname | Location | Enrollment (CB/FB 2024) | State FB Region (2024) | Colors | Address | Type | Join Date |
|---|---|---|---|---|---|---|---|---|
| Bowsher | Blue Racers | Toledo | 395 | 2:6 | Red, Columbia | 2200 Arlington Ave. Toledo, OH 43614 | Public | 1962 |
| Lima Senior | Spartans | Lima | 456 | 2:8 | Scarlet, Gray | 1 Spartan Way; Lima, OH 45801 | Public | 2023 |
| Rogers | Rams | Toledo | 327 | 3:10 | Red, White, Black | 222 McTigue Dr. Toledo, OH 43615 | Public | 1967 |
| Scott | Bulldogs | Toledo | 370 | 3:10 | Maroon, White | 2400 Collingwood Ave. Toledo, OH 43620 | Public | 1926 |
| Start | Spartans | Toledo | 521 | 2:6 | Green, White | 2010 Tremainsville Rd. Toledo, OH 43613 | Public | 1962 |
| Waite | Indians | Toledo | 465 | 2:6 | Purple, Gold | 301 Morrison Dr. Toledo, OH 43605 | Public | 1926 |
| Woodward | Polar Bears | Toledo | 288 | 3:10 | Blue, White | 701 E. Central Ave. Toledo, OH 43608 | Public | 1926 |

=== Affiliate members ===
| School | Nickname | Location | Colors | Type | Membership Type | Joined League |
|---|---|---|---|---|---|---|
| Northwood | Rangers | Northwood | Blue, Yellow | Public | Wrestling only | 2014-15 |

=== Former members ===
| School | Nickname | Location | Colors | Address | Type | Tenure | Reason for Departure |
|---|---|---|---|---|---|---|---|
| Cardinal Stritch | Cardinals | Oregon | Red, Black | 3225 Pickle Rd. Oregon, OH 43616 | Parochial | 1971–1994 | Enrollment became smaller than member schools |
| Central Catholic | Fighting Irish | Toledo | Scarlet, Gray | 2550 Cherry St. Toledo, OH 43608 | Parochial | 1928–2011 | Left for the TRAC |
| Clay | Eagles | Oregon | Green, Yellow | 5665 Seaman Rd. Oregon, OH 43616 | Public | 2003–2011 | Left for the TRAC |
| DeVilbiss | Tigers | Toledo | Orange, Black | 3301 Upton Ave. Toledo, OH 43613 | Public | 1933–1991 | Closed by TPS |
| Libbey | Cowboys | Toledo | Blue, Gold | 1250 Western Ave. Toledo, OH 43609 | Public | 1926–2010 | Closed by TPS |
| Macomber-Whitney | Macmen | Toledo | Black, Gold | 1501 Monroe St./ 1602 Washington St. Toledo, OH 43604 | Public Vocational | 1935–1991 | Closed by TPS |
| McAuley | Lions | Toledo | Green, Gold | 2303 Brookford Dr. Toledo, OH 43614 | Parochial (Girls) | c. 1976-1988 | Closed due to financial woes |
| Notre Dame | Eagles | Toledo | Blue, Gold | 3535 W. Sylvania Ave. Toledo, OH 43623 | Parochial (Girls) | c. 1977-2011 | Left for the TRAC |
| St. Francis de Sales | Knights | Toledo | Red, Blue, White | 2323 W. Bancroft Ave. Toledo, OH 43607 | Parochial (Boys) | 1963–2011 | Left for the TRAC |
| St. John's Jesuit | Titans | Toledo | Blue, Vegas Gold | 5901 Airport Hwy. Toledo, OH 43615 | Parochial (Boys) | 1968–2011 | Left for the TRAC |
| St. Ursula | Arrows | Toledo | Blue, Gold | 4025 Indian Rd. Toledo, OH 43606 | Parochial (Girls) | c. 1977-2011 | Left for the TRAC |
| Whitmer | Panthers | Toledo | Maize, Blue | 5601 Clegg Dr. Toledo, OH 43613 | Public | 2003–2011 | Left for the TRAC |

== History ==
=== 1920s ===
- The league begins in 1926 with the first boys track and field meet held May 1. The charter members were Libbey, Scott, Waite, and Woodward. The 1926–27 school year was the first for full City League play.
- Central Catholic joins the league in 1928.
- For the 1928–29 school year, Woodward moves from its original location in the old Central High School building into its new building on Streicher.

=== 1930s ===
- DeVilbiss opens in 1931 and begins league play for the 1933–34 school year.
- Waite's stadium was dedicated on September 21, 1934.
- Vocational High School began athletic competition during the 1935–36 school year. The Craftsmen would eventually move to a new building on Monroe Street and become Macomber High School.
- Macomber opens and joins the league for the 1938–39 school year.

=== 1940s ===
- DeVilbiss dominates the boys track & field competition, taking league titles from 1942 to 1947 and another one in 1949. Including the title in 1951, the Tigers would earn 8 league titles over a span of ten years.

=== 1950s ===
- Macomber's football program joins the league in 1952 after starting up a team in 1951.
- Macomber forms a joint operation with Whitney in 1959 after spending 20 years as separate neighbors. The two schools were frequently referred to as one Macomber-Whitney

=== 1960s ===
- Bowsher and Start are built in 1962 and both begin league play immediately, with football following for the 1963–64 school year. St. Francis would also join the league with them at the same time after opening in 1955.
- In 1963, night football was banned by the public schools after riots that had started at the end of games over the last few years. Stadiums were closed at 6:30 pm and games scheduled at public school sites were rescheduled for Saturday mornings and afternoons.
- Cross Country began its championship meet in 1965 after years of declaring the champion based on season records.
- The City League's football championship game, called the Shoe Bowl, begins in 1966.
- Rogers begins league play in 1967 after being absorbed by Toledo Public Schools in 1966. For certain sports, the league is split into 2 divisions, pitting the Red and Blue champions against each other for the league title. Initially, there were six in the Red and five in the Blue.
- St. John's begin league play in 1968 after their new building had been completed in 1965. They joined the Blue Division, creating an even six members to each division.
- For the 1969 football season, new stadiums were opened at Bowsher, Start, and Woodward. Woodward had gone without a stadium since the 1930s.

City League Divisions 1967-1971
| Red | Blue |
|---|---|
| Bowsher | Libbey |
| Central Catholic | St. Francis |
| DeVilbiss | St. John's (joined 1968) |
| Macomber | Start |
| Rogers | Waite |
| Scott | Woodward |
| | Cardinal Stritch (joined 1971) |

City League Divisions 1972-1989
| Red | Blue |
|---|---|
| Central Catholic | Bowsher |
| DeVilbiss | Libbey |
| Macomber | Rogers |
| Scott | St. Francis |
| Start | St. John's |
| Woodward | Waite |
| | Cardinal Stritch |

=== 1970s ===
- Scott's 10,367-seat Fred L. Siebert Stadium is demolished in February 1970 after being condemned. It had been gradually built in the late 1910s/early 1920s and was dedicated in 1924. A roughly 4,000-seat replacement was dedicated in 1971.
- The City League makes history by becoming the first major Ohio conference to sponsor a girls' sports championship; the girls league track meet in 1970. The 1972 City League track championship would also be the first co-ed track meet in Ohio.
- Girls basketball returned to competition for the first time in 33 years and was made a league sport in the 1969–70 school year, with teams from Bowsher, Central Catholic, DeVilbiss, Libbey, Rogers, Scott, Start, Waite, and Woodward competing against each other for the first time. Prior to this setup, girls at the public schools only competed in intramural-type fashion. It was expected to add McAuley, Notre Dame, St. Ursula, Spencer-Sharples, and Whitney to the mix the following year.
- Waite's football stadium was renamed Jack Mollenkopf Stadium in honor of their former coach on October 9, 1970.
- Cardinal Stritch joins the league for the 1971–72 school year (Blue Division), making them the first non-Toledo school to become a member. Plans were considered by league commissioner Hilton Murphy to expand the league with an even number of members, and the names of Whitmer and Bedford (MI) were brought up at the time.
- The south home stands at Libbey's Robinson Memorial Stadium were condemned and removed in 1973.
- Later in the decade, Whitney (1973), McAuley (1976), Notre Dame (1977), and St. Ursula (1977) are all granted league membership as the first all-girls schools in the league.

=== 1980s ===
- Although not officially a City League member, but governed by Toledo Public Schools since 1968, Spencer-Sharples High School was closed at the end of the 1979–80 school year.
- In the early 1980s, football was considered to be dropped as a league sport when Libbey, Scott, and Waite were struggling to field a team, while DeVilbiss, Macomber, and Woodward were having low numbers. The parochial schools also considered leaving the league around this time, as 13 members was considered too many for a city Toledo's size.
- After 19 years, night football returned to the City League in 1982.
- St. Francis wins the first OHSAA State Football Tournament Championship for a City League team in 1984.
- Three City League teams would bring home state titles in basketball: (St. Francis in 1982–83, Macomber in 1988–89, and Scott in 1989–90.)
- DeVilbiss' Henry A. Page Stadium is condemned in 1985 after the concrete and metal supports began to fall apart. The stadium was repaired and rededicated in 1986.
- McAuley is closed after the 1987–88 school year.
- Libbey's football team drops out of the league for the 1987, '88, and '89 seasons. They failed to field a team in '87 and played a non-league schedule the following two years before returning in 1990, the first year the divisions were eliminated. Meanwhile, Libbey's Charles Robinson Memorial Stadium had its bleachers torn down in 1987. The stadium had been dedicated on October 29, 1927.
- Shortly after winning the 1989 Division I State basketball title, Macomber-Whitney and the Jefferson Center were considered for closure following the 1988–89 school year. The TPS board decided to keep the schools open for the time being.

=== 1990s ===
- A new point system was developed for the football championship in the 1990 season, effectively eliminating the Red and Blue divisions.
- Macomber's freshman class was cut at the beginning of the 1990–91 school year to save costs. Plans were considered to eventually cut the sophomore class as well.
- Due to financial problems and a declining enrollment, DeVilbiss and Macomber-Whitney were regrettably closed by TPS following the 1990–91 school year. Libbey was also considered for closure, but survived the chopping block. To also help curb financial woes for the district, TPS decided at the same time to eliminate fall sports for the 1991–92 school year, causing the parochial schools to compile independent schedules for the 1991 season.
- In a reversal of fortune, a levy passed in May 1991 that allowed for the public schools that were not closed to have fall sports. Since the parochial schools had already scheduled games as independents, they were not able to compete for City League titles in the fall of 1991.
- The Hall of Fame Game began in the 1991–92 school year as the league football championship game after the league eliminated the Shoe Bowl following the 1990 football season.
- The private schools returned to league play for the winter sports season of 1992–93.
- Cardinal Stritch withdrew its membership at the end of the 1993–94 school year since its enrollment numbers were significantly smaller than the other schools.
- After 10 seasons without a home football game and multiple forfeits for low player turnout, Libbey's new on-campus stadium was opened September 27, 1996.

=== 2000s ===
- For the 2003–2004 school year, longtime City League rival Whitmer and Oregon Clay leave the crumbling Great Lakes League to become the City League's newest members.
- During the 2008–09 school year, Clay applied for membership in the Northern Lakes League as a replacement for Rossford High School who left the NLL after the 2010–11 school year for the newly formed Northern Buckeye Conference. In June 2009, the NLL announced that it would be accepting Napoleon High School from the Greater Buckeye Conference as its replacement for Rossford and Clay would remain in the City League.
- Findlay and Lima Senior high schools, both members of the dwindling GBC, announced they were trying to seek membership of the City League in August 2009. This prompted fellow GBC member Fremont Ross to apply for membership as well. In mid-October 2009, Fremont Ross was voted in to be a member for the 2011–12 school year, but both Findlay and Lima Senior were denied membership.

=== 2010s ===
- Concerned about the elimination of several junior high, freshmen, and less-popular sports within the league due to Toledo Public Schools' $39 million deficit, CL members from non-TPS schools met to discuss possibly forming a new league in late May. Representatives from Central Catholic, Clay, Fremont Ross, Notre Dame, St. Francis, St. John's, St. Ursula and Whitmer got together and invited representatives from current GBC schools Findlay and Lima Senior to gather interest in possibly starting a new conference that would take effect no sooner than 2011–12.
- After a failed levy in early May 2010, TPS voted on May 25 to close Libbey at the conclusion of the 2009–10 school year. Ever since being included with DeVilbiss and Macomber for closure in 1991, Libbey had constantly been considered for shutting its doors permanently, and it had nearly become an annual topic during its last few years. Strong community support kept Libbey open in the past, as had the sorrowful remorse felt over closing schools beforehand. The Libbey building was demolished in early 2012.
- On July 14, 2010, the Oregon School board voted 5–0 in favor of withdrawing Clay from the City League. The athletic directors at Notre Dame, St. John's, St. Ursula, and Whitmer also confirmed that they had sent in withdrawal letters to the league on the same day, set to take effect at the end of the 2010–11 school year. Central Catholic and St. Francis followed suit in the few days after, although they were initially hesitant to leave the league they had called home for so long. Clay AD Mike Donnelly reported that future CL member Fremont Ross was also likely to withdraw its membership (and never actually compete as a City League member), and that Findlay and Lima Senior were likely to get invitations to the new league. The new league became the Three Rivers Athletic Conference.
- The final Hall of Fame Game was played on Thursday, November 4, 2010, with Rogers defeating Waite 44–14 at Rogers High School.
- In another display of the City League's glory days being washed away, DeVilbiss' historic and twice-condemned Page Stadium was fully torn down at the end of May 2012. It had been built in 1934.
- In September 2012, it was reported that the City League considered expanding by two members to make an eight-school league.
- In November 2013, TPS approved a resolution to have new stadiums built at Scott and Woodward after their previous facilities were torn down during renovation and construction in the 2000s. They were built in time for the 2014 season.

=== 2020s ===
- In December 2020, Bowsher announced they would drop their "Rebels" nickname to become the "Blue Racers", which are a snake native to South Toledo and Swan Creek.
- On March 10, 2022, Lima Senior announced that it would be joining the Toledo City League in 2023 on a four-year contract as its seventh member. The Spartans weren't invited to join the NLL with the other public TRAC schools and decided being in a league was preferable to independence.

=== Boys League Championships ===
- (Football champions were determined with a point system from 1990 to 2010. Prior to that, it went to the schools with the best league record or the winner of the Shoe Bowl. Since then it has gone to the school with the best league record.)

| School Year | Football | Cross Country | Basketball | Wrestling | Baseball | Track & Field |
|---|---|---|---|---|---|---|
| 1925-26 | N/A | N/A | N/A | N/A | | Waite |
| 1926-27 | Waite | N/A | Waite | | | Waite |
| 1927-28 | Scott | N/A | Woodward | | | Scott |
| 1928-29 | Libbey, Scott, Waite | N/A | Scott | | | Scott |
| 1929-30 | Libbey, Scott, Waite | N/A | Woodward | | | Scott |
| 1930-31 | Libbey, Scott | N/A | Libbey | | | Scott |
| 1931-32 | Libbey | N/A | Waite | | | Scott |
| 1932-33 | Waite | N/A | Waite | | | DeVilbiss |
| 1933-34 | Waite | N/A | Central Catholic | | | Scott |
| 1934-35 | Waite | N/A | DeVilbiss | | DeVilbiss | Scott |
| 1935-36 | Waite | N/A | DeVilbiss | | DeVilbiss | Scott |
| 1936-37 | Central Catholic | N/A | Central Catholic | | DeVilbiss | |
| 1937-38 | Waite | N/A | Waite | | Macomber | |
| 1938-39 | DeVilbiss, Scott, Waite | N/A | Central Catholic | | Macomber | |
| 1939-40 | Waite | N/A | Libbey, Woodward | | DeVilbiss, Macomber | |
| 1940-41 | Waite | N/A | Libbey | | Macomber | |
| 1941-42 | Libbey | N/A | Central Catholic, Woodward | | | DeVilbiss |
| 1942-43 | Libbey | N/A | Macomber, Woodward | | | DeVilbiss |
| 1943-44 | Waite | N/A | DeVilbiss, Woodward | | | DeVilbiss |
| 1944-45 | Central Catholic, Libbey | N/A | Woodward | | | DeVilbiss |
| 1945-46 | Waite | N/A | Macomber | | | DeVilbiss |
| 1946-47 | Libbey | N/A | Woodward | | Macomber | DeVilbiss |
| 1947-48 | Libbey, Waite | N/A | Central Catholic | | Macomber | |
| 1948-49 | Waite | N/A | Central Catholic | | Central Catholic | DeVilbiss |
| 1949-50 | Central Catholic, Libbey | N/A | DeVilbiss | | DeVilbiss | |
| 1950-51 | Scott | N/A | Central Catholic, Macomber | | | DeVilbiss |
| 1951-52 | Central Catholic, Libbey | N/A | Central Catholic, DeVilbiss | | | Libbey |
| 1952-53 | Libbey, Waite, Woodward | N/A | Central Catholic, Waite, Woodward | | | Libbey |
| 1953-54 | DeVilbiss | N/A | Macomber | | DeVilbiss, Macomber | DeVilbiss |
| 1954-55 | DeVilbiss | N/A | Libbey | | | Libbey |
| 1955-56 | DeVilbiss | N/A | Macomber | | Macomber | Libbey |
| 1956-57 | Waite | N/A | Macomber | | DeVilbiss | Libbey |
| 1957-58 | DeVilbiss | N/A | Scott | | | Libbey |
| 1958-59 | DeVilbiss | N/A | Central Catholic | | | Libbey |
| 1959-60 | DeVilbiss | Libbey | Scott, Woodward | | | Libbey |
| 1960-61 | Central Catholic | Libbey | Macomber | | | Libbey |
| 1961-62 | DeVilbiss, Macomber | Libbey | Central Catholic | | DeVilbiss | |
| 1962-63 | Central Catholic | | Central Catholic | | | |
| 1963-64 | Waite | | Woodward | | DeVilbiss | |
| 1964-65 | Macomber | | St. Francis | | | Scott |
| 1965-66 | St. Francis | | Libbey | | | Woodward |
| 1966-67 | St. Francis | Libbey | Central Catholic | | | Scott |
| 1967-68 | Central Catholic | Libbey | Central Catholic | | | Scott |
| 1968-69 | St. Francis | St. John's Jesuit | Libbey | | | Scott |
| 1969-70 | Bowsher | DeVilbiss | Libbey | | | |
| 1970-71 | Macomber | DeVilbiss | Macomber | Rogers | | |
| 1971-72 | Scott | DeVilbiss | Scott | | | |
| 1972-73 | Scott | Bowsher | St. Francis | | Start | |
| 1973-74 | DeVilbiss | DeVilbiss | Scott | Rogers | Bowsher | |
| 1974-75 | DeVilbiss | DeVilbiss | Scott | Rogers | | |
| 1975-76 | St. John's, Woodward | DeVilbiss | Scott | Cardinal Stritch | | |
| 1976-77 | St. John's Jesuit | St. John's Jesuit | Scott | Cardinal Stritch | | Macomber |
| 1977-78 | St. John's Jesuit | St. John's Jesuit | Scott | | | |
| 1978-79 | Start | St. John's Jesuit | Start | Cardinal Stritch | Start | Rogers |
| 1979-80 | Bowsher | St. John's Jesuit | Scott | Cardinal Stritch | DeVilbiss | |
| 1980-81 | Macomber (St. Francis) | St. Francis | St. John's Jesuit | Cardinal Stritch | | DeVilbiss |
| 1981-82 | St. John's Jesuit | DeVilbiss | Scott | Cardinal Stritch | | DeVilbiss |
| 1982-83 | Central Catholic (St. Francis) | St. Francis | St. Francis | Cardinal Stritch | | |
| 1983-84 | Macomber | Waite | Scott | Rogers | | |
| 1984-85 | Scott (St. Francis) | Rogers | Scott | Rogers | | Rogers |
| 1985-86 | Scott (DeVilbiss) | St. Francis | Scott | Rogers | | Rogers |
| 1986-87 | St. Francis | St. Francis | St. Francis | Rogers | | DeVilbiss |
| 1987-88 | St. John's Jesuit | St. Francis | Macomber | Rogers | | DeVilbiss |
| 1988-89 | St. Francis | St. Francis | Macomber | Central Catholic | | DeVilbiss |
| 1989-90 | DeVilbiss | St. Francis | Scott | St. John's Jesuit | | Scott |
| 1990-91 | St. John's Jesuit, Woodward | Central Catholic | St. Francis | | St. John's Jesuit | Start |
| 1991-92 | Woodward | St. Francis | Scott | | | Rogers |
| 1992-93 | St. Francis | St. Francis | St. John's Jesuit | St. John's Jesuit | St. John's Jesuit | Rogers |
| 1993-94 | St. Francis | St. Francis | St. John's Jesuit | | | Rogers |
| 1994-95 | St. John's Jesuit | St. John's Jesuit | St. John's Jesuit | St. John's Jesuit | | Central Catholic |
| 1995-96 | St. Francis | St. John's Jesuit | St. John's Jesuit | St. John's Jesuit | | Rogers |
| 1996-97 | St. John's Jesuit | St. Francis | Start | | | Central Catholic |
| 1997-98 | St. Francis | St. Francis | St. John's Jesuit | | | |
| 1998-99 | St. Francis | St. John's Jesuit | St. John's Jesuit | | | |
| 1999-00 | St. Francis | St. John's Jesuit | Libbey | Waite | St. John's Jesuit | Rogers |
| 2000-01 | Rogers | St. John's Jesuit | Scott | | St. John's Jesuit | Rogers |
| 2001-02 | St. Francis | St. Francis | St. John's Jesuit | | | Rogers |
| 2002-03 | St. Francis | St. John's Jesuit | St. John's Jesuit | Waite | | Rogers |
| 2003-04 | St. Francis | Central Catholic | St. John's Jesuit | Waite | St. John's Jesuit | Central Catholic |
| 2004-05 | St. Francis | St. John's Jesuit | St. John's Jesuit | Waite | | St. Francis |
| 2005-06 | Central Catholic | St. John's Jesuit | Scott | | | Whitmer |
| 2006-07 | Central Catholic | St. John's Jesuit | Libbey | | | St. John's Jesuit |
| 2007-08 | Central Catholic | St. John's Jesuit | Libbey | Central Catholic | Central Catholic | St. John's Jesuit |
| 2008-09 | Central Catholic | St. John's Jesuit | St. John's Jesuit | Clay | Clay | St. John's Jesuit |
| 2009-10 | Whitmer | St. John's Jesuit | Central Catholic | Clay | Central Catholic | Whitmer |
| 2010-11 | Whitmer | St. Francis | Whitmer | Clay | Whitmer | St. John's Jesuit |
| 2011-12 | Rogers | Bowsher | Rogers | N/A | Bowsher | Bowsher |
| 2012-13 | Bowsher | Start | Start | N/A | | Rogers* |
| 2013-14 | Bowsher | | Bowsher | | | |
| 2014-15 | Bowsher, Scott, Waite | | | | | |
| 2015-16 | Start | | | | | |
| 2016-17 | Start | | | | | |
| 2017-18 | Start | | | | | |
| 2018-19 | Start | | | | | |
| 2019-20 | Woodward | | | | | |
| 2020-21 | Start | | | | | |
| 2021-22 | | | | | | |

- Note: Teams in parentheses passed on the Shoe Bowl for the OHSAA playoffs, essentially giving up the opportunity to win the City title.
- Start had to vacate their 2013 track & field title after it was discovered that they'd used an ineligible player. The title was then awarded to runner-up Rogers.
- Due to the COVID-19 pandemic during the 2020 football season, the City League schools only played each other and had a four team playoff to determine their champion. After Start defeated Rogers and Woodward beat Waite, Start topped Woodward 20–14 in the championship game.

=== Shoe Bowl/Hall of Fame Game Results ===
Shoe Bowl Results 1966-1990
| Year | Winning School | Score | Losing School | Score |
|---|---|---|---|---|
| 1966 | St. Francis | 47 | DeVilbiss | 6 |
| 1967 | Central Catholic | 8 | St. Francis | 7 |
| 1968 | St. Francis | 8 | Central Catholic | 3 |
| 1969 | Bowsher | 12 | St. Francis | 8 |
| 1970 | Macomber | 14 | St. John's | 3 |
| 1971 | Scott | 18 | Woodward | 6 |
| 1972 | Scott | 13 | Cardinal Stritch | 6 |
| 1973 | DeVilbiss | 7 | St. John's | 0 |
| 1974 | DeVilbiss | 45 | St. John's | 20 |
| 1975 | Woodward | 7 | St. John's | 7 |
| 1976 | St. John's | 16 | Central Catholic | 8 |
| 1977 | St. John's | 21 | St. Francis | 13 |
| 1978 | Start | 41 | Bowsher | 6 |
| 1979 | Bowsher | 16 | Start | 14 |
| 1980 | Macomber | 15 | St. John's | 0 |
| 1981 | St. John's | 24 | Macomber | 0 |
| 1982 | Central Catholic | 21 | St. John's | 7 |
| 1983 | Macomber | 14 | St. Francis | 0 |
| 1984 | Scott | 35 | Libbey | 0 |
| 1985 | Scott | 42 | St. John's | 0 |
| 1986 | St. Francis | 24 | Central Catholic | 7 |
| 1987 | St. John's | 33 | Central Catholic | 21 |
| 1988 | St. Francis | 12 | Central Catholic | 9 |
| 1989 | DeVilbiss | 17 | St. John's | 13 |
| 1990 | St. John's | 6 | Macomber | 0 |

Hall of Fame Game Results 1991–2005, 2008–2010
| Year | Winning School | Score | Losing School | Score |
|---|---|---|---|---|
| 1991 | St. Francis | 26 | Woodward | 0 |
| 1992 | St. John's | 20 | Start | 8 |
| 1993 | St. Francis | 20 | Central Catholic | 0 |
| 1994 | Central Catholic | 20 | St. Francis | 7 |
| 1995 | Bowsher | 12 | Central Catholic | 7 |
| 1996 | St. Francis | 22 | Central Catholic | 7 |
| 1997 | Start | 17 | St. John's | 7 |
| 1998 | St. Francis | 41 | St. John's | 7 |
| 1999 | St. John's | 43 | Bowsher | 7 |
| 2000 | Central Catholic | 28 | St. John's | 7 |
| 2001 | St. John's | 31 | Scott | 6 |
| 2002 | Start | 26 | Rogers | 12 |
| 2003 | Start | 46 | Clay | 13 |
| 2004 | St. John's | 28 | Bowsher | 6 |
| 2005 | St. Francis | 27 | Scott | 7 |
| 2008 | Whitmer | 42 | St. John's | 35 |
| 2009 | St. John's | 42 | Bowsher | 28 |
| 2010 | Rogers | 44 | Waite | 14 |

=== Boys Basketball Championship Game Results ===
Boys Basketball Championship Results 1968-2011
| Year | Winning School | Score | Losing School | Score |
|---|---|---|---|---|
| 1968 | Central Catholic | 43 | Libbey | 40 |
| 1969 | Libbey | 63 | Macomber | 43 |
| 1970 | Libbey | 72 | Macomber | 70 (2OT) |
| 1971 | Macomber | 70 | Start | 69 |
| 1972 | Scott | 60 | Libbey | 49 |
| 1973 | St. Francis | 47 | DeVilbiss | 46 |
| 1974 | Scott | 42 | Waite | 37 |
| 1975 | Scott | 77 | Rogers | 65 |
| 1976 | Scott | 50 | Rogers | 34 |
| 1977 | Scott | 79 | Bowsher | 51 |
| 1978 | Scott | 67 | St. Francis | 55 |
| 1979 | Start | 62 | St. Francis | 56 |
| 1980 | Scott | 75 | Libbey | 66 |
| 1981 | St. John's | 58 | Macomber | 57 |
| 1982 | Scott | 51 | Rogers | 32 |
| 1983 | St. Francis | 62 | Macomber | 52 |
| 1984 | Scott | 71 | St. Francis | 53 |
| 1985 | Scott | 77 | Rogers | 65 |
| 1986 | Scott | 83 | Rogers | 58 |
| 1987 | St. Francis | 53 | Macomber | 51 |
| 1988 | Macomber | 73 | St. John's | 50 |
| 1989 | Macomber | 91 | St. Francis | 59 |
| 1990 | Scott | 63 | St. John's | 48 |
| 1991 | St. Francis | 69 | Scott | 45 |
| 1992 | Scott | 58 | St. John's | 55 |
| 1993 | St. John's | 77 | Scott | 62 |
| 1994 | St. John's | 52 | Scott | 41 |
| 1995 | St. John's | 52 | Central Catholic | 45 |
| 1996 | St. John's | 59 | Libbey | 44 |
| 1997 | Start | 68 | Libbey | 51 |
| 1998 | St. John's | 63 | Scott | 44 |
| 1999 | St. John's | 58 | Scott | 43 |
| 2000 | Libbey | 73 | Scott | 64 (OT) |
| 2001 | Scott | 48 | Waite | 47 |
| 2002 | St. John's | 53 | Scott | 51 |
| 2003 | St. John's | 65 | Libbey | 40 |
| 2004 | St. John's | 50 | Libbey | 42 |
| 2005 | St. John's | 68 | Libbey | 61 |
| 2006 | Scott | 56 | St. John's | 51 (OT) |
| 2007 | Libbey | 61 | St. John's | 49 |
| 2008 | Libbey | | | |
| 2009 | St. John's | | | |
| 2010 | Central Catholic | 36 | St. Francis | 28 |
| 2011 | Whitmer | 51 | St. John's | 48 |
| 2012 | Rogers | 70 | Scott | 59 |
| 2013 | Start | 70 | Bowsher | 65 |

=== Girls League championships ===
| Year | Volleyball | Cross Country | Basketball | Softball | Track & Field |
|---|---|---|---|---|---|
| 1969-70 | | | | | Woodward |
| 1970-71 | | | | | Rogers |
| 1971-72 | | | | | Scott |
| 1972-73 | | | | | Start |
| 1973-74 | | | | | Start |
| 1974-75 | | | | | Start |
| 1975-76 | | | | | Scott |
| 1976-77 | Rogers | | | | Rogers |
| 1977-78 | DeVilbiss | | | | Rogers |
| 1978-79 | | | | | Rogers |
| 1979-80 | | | | | Rogers |
| 1980-81 | | | | | Rogers |
| 1981-82 | | | | | |
| 1982-83 | | | | | |
| 1983-84 | | | DeVilbiss | | |
| 1984-85 | DeVilbiss | DeVilbiss | | | DeVilbiss |
| 1985-86 | | | | | DeVilbiss |
| 1986-87 | DeVilbiss | | | | Macomber-Whitney |
| 1987-88 | | | | | DeVilbiss |
| 1988-89 | | | | | DeVilbiss |
| 1989-90 | | | | | |
| 1990-91 | | | Macomber-Whitney | | |
| 1991-92 | | | | | Rogers |
| 1992-93 | | | | | |
| 1993-94 | | | | | |
| 1994-95 | | | | | |
| 1995-96 | | | | | |
| 1996-97 | | | | | Rogers |
| 1997-98 | | | | | Rogers |
| 1998-99 | Bowsher | | | | Rogers |
| 1999-00 | | | | | |
| 2000-01 | | | | Bowsher | Central Catholic |
| 2001-02 | | | | | Central Catholic |
| 2002-03 | | | | | Central Catholic |
| 2003-04 | | | | | Clay |
| 2004-05 | | | | | |
| 2005-06 | | | | | |
| 2006-07 | | | | | |
| 2007-08 | | | | | |
| 2008-09 | | | | | |
| 2009-10 | | | | | Whitmer |
| 2010-11 | | | Start | | Notre Dame |
| 2011-12 | Bowsher | Start | Rogers | Bowsher | Bowsher |
| 2012-13 | Bowsher | Rogers | Rogers | Rogers | Rogers |
| 2013-14 | | Rogers | Rogers | Bowsher | |
| 2014-15 | | | | Bowsher | |
| 2015-16 | | | | Bowsher | |
| 2016-17 | | | | Bowsher | |

== See also ==
Ohio High School Athletic Conferences
