= McAuley High School (Toledo, Ohio) =

Location
- 2303 Brookford Drive; Toledo, Lucas Co., Ohio 43614; United States
- Coordinates: 41°36′02″N 83°36′02″W

Information
- Type: Private, All-Female
- Religious affiliation: Roman Catholic
- Established: 1958
- Closed: 1988
- Grades: 9-12
- Colors: Green & gold
- Athletics conference: Toledo City League
- Nickname: Lions

McAuley High School was an all-girls Catholic high school in Toledo, Ohio. It was named for Catherine McAuley, the founder of the Sisters of Mercy. It began classes in 1958 and was one of three all-girls Catholic high schools in the city, the other two being Notre Dame Academy and St. Ursula Academy.

The McAuley Lions were members of the Toledo City League and joined c. 1976. Girls' sports competition between schools had begun in the early 1970s for Toledo high schools.

Due to financial problems and low enrollment, McAuley closed at the end of the 1987–88 school year. They intended to have 1,000 students annually, but had a peak of 551 during the 1969–70 school year. In 1988, Toledo Christian Schools bought and moved into the McAuley building, which has remained a Pre-K to 12th grade Christian faith-based school ever since.
