= Great Lakes League =

Great Lakes League may refer to:

- Great Lakes League, Current Northeast Ohio high school ice hockey conference
- Great Lakes League, Defunct Northwest Ohio high school all-sports conference
