= Philana Marie Boles =

American writer

Philana Boles
- Born: Philana Marie Boles; Toledo, Ohio, U.S.
- Occupation: Writer/novelist

Philana Marie Boles is the author of the young adult novels Glitz and Little Divas, as well as the adult novels Blame It On Eve and In the Paint.

== Early life ==
Boles graduated from St. Ursula Academy in Toledo, Ohio in 1994 and studied creative writing and theatre at Bowling Green State University. She has written for Glamour magazine, 40 Acres & A Mule Filmworks, and Toledo Free Press. She has also worked as a long-term substitute teacher for public and community schools.

== Career ==
Critics compared Boles' writing in Little Divas to the works of Judy Blume and Phyllis Reynolds Naylor. Sybil Wilkes of the Tom Joyner Morning Show twice featured Little Divas as a recommended book for youth.
