= Lima City School District =

School district in Ohio

Lima City Schools or Lima City School District refers to a school district that serves students in Lima, Ohio and surrounding communities.

== Schools ==
Elementary

- Freedom Elementary School
- Heritage Elementary School
- Independence Elementary School
- Liberty Elementary School
- Unity Elementary School

Middle Schools

- Lima North Middle School
- Lima South Middle School
- Lima West Middle School

High Schools

- Lima Senior High School
- Lima Alternative High School
