= Greater Buckeye Conference =

Former athletic organization in Ohio

- Classification: OHSAA Division I
- Founded: 2003
- Sports fielded: 8 for boys, 8 for girls
- No. of teams: 6
- Region: Ohio

Locations
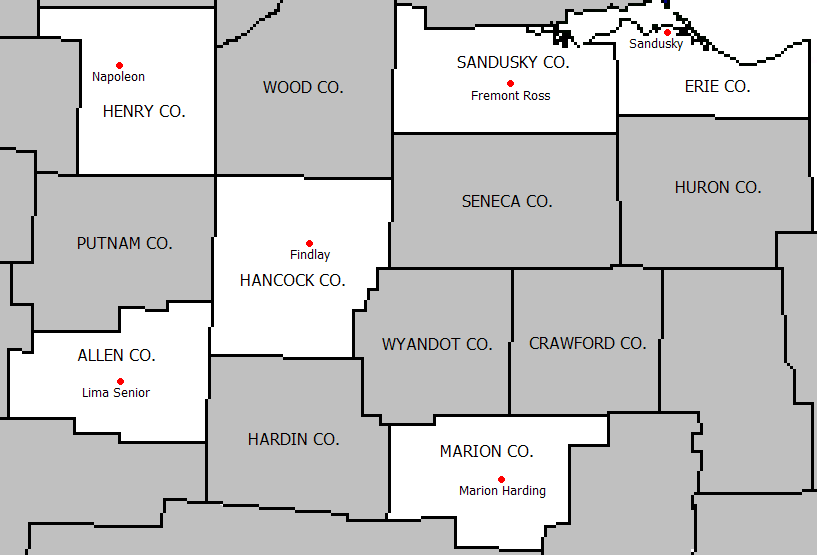
- The member schools of the Greater Buckeye Conference

The Greater Buckeye Conference was a high school athletic conference with six members, all located in a large area of northern and northwest Ohio. It was affiliated with the Ohio High School Athletic Association. The conference was created for the 2003-2004 school year after the Great Lakes League folded, and lasted until the end of the 2010-11 school year.

The conference's longest and most storied rivalry was between the football teams of Fremont Ross and Sandusky. The Little Giants and the Blue Streaks had first played in 1895.

== Members ==
- Findlay Trojans
- Fremont Ross Little Giants
- Lima Senior Spartans
- Marion Harding Presidents
- Napoleon Wildcats
- Sandusky Blue Streaks

== Departing members ==
High School	Location	Joined GBC	Tenure of Membership	Charter Member	League in 2011
Findlay High School	Findlay, Ohio	2003	2003–2011	Yes	Three Rivers Athletic Conference
Fremont Ross High School	Fremont, Ohio	2003	2003–2011	Yes	Three Rivers Athletic Conference
Lima Senior High School	Lima, Ohio	2003	2003–2011	Yes	Three Rivers Athletic Conference
Marion Harding High School	Marion, Ohio	2003	2003–2011	Yes	None, joined MOAC in 2014
Napoleon High School	Napoleon, Ohio	2003	2003–2011	Yes	Northern Lakes League
Sandusky High School	Sandusky, Ohio	2003	2003–2011	Yes	Northern Ohio League

== History ==
=== Great Northern Conference years ===
The Great Northern Conference was created April 14, 1945, in Maumee in a meeting attended by representatives from Oregon Clay, Maumee, Perrysburg, Rossford, Sylvania and Toledo Whitmer. All had previously been members of the Maumee Valley League.

Talks on expanding were held in 1950 and 1951 because of increasing enrollments at some schools, but action was not taken until 1952 when Anthony Wayne left the Maumee Valley League to join the GNC gradually, starting with the spring of 1953 in baseball.

Sylvania was forced to cancel its winter and spring sports during the 1957-58 school year after a levy attempt failed in the fall of 1957.

=== Creation of divisions and two new leagues ===
Talks had begun in 1956 to expand the GNC with Bowling Green, Fostoria, Swanton, Oak Harbor, Genoa, Lake, Port Clinton, Toledo Rogers and Holland being considered. The GNC eventually grew and split into two divisions based on size— Orange: (Bowling Green, Clay, Fostoria, Toledo Rogers, Sylvania and Toledo Whitmer) and Blue: (Anthony Wayne, Genoa, Maumee, Perrysburg, Port Clinton and Rossford). The names were changed in 1957, with the Orange Division becoming the Great Lakes League and the Blue Division becoming the Northern Lakes League.

Great Northern Conference Divisions (created in 1956)
Orange / Great Lakes League	Blue / Northern Lakes League
Bowling Green	Anthony Wayne
Clay	Genoa
Fostoria	Maumee
Rogers	Perrysburg
Sylvania	Port Clinton
Whitmer	Rossford

=== Constant change in membership ===
Bowling Green left the GLL in June 1960, and Bedford (MI) joined in 1961.

Port Clinton switched from the NLL to the GLL with the start of the 1963-64 school year.

Toledo Rogers left the GLL to join the Toledo City League with the start of the 1966-67 school year when their district was absorbed by Toledo Public Schools.

According to GLL constitution, Toledo Whitmer's enrollment became too great in 1967 and the school was dropped from the league with the end of the 1968-69 school year.

Bowling Green rejoined with the start of the 1969-70 school year. At this time, the GLL consisted of Bedford, Bowling Green, Clay, Fostoria, Port Clinton, and Sylvania.

When Sylvania divided into Northview and Southview in 1976, Northview (the original Sylvania HS building) remained in the GLL and Southview joined the NLL.

Bowling Green switched from the GLL to the NLL in 1978, and Napoleon joined the GLL at the start of the 1978-79 school year.

Port Clinton left at the start of the 1980-81 school year for the Sandusky Bay Conference and was replaced by Lima Shawnee, which competed in the GLL only in 1980-81 and 1981-82.

Toledo Whitmer rejoined at the start of the 1982-83 school year.

Fremont Ross joined at the start of the 1991-92 school year, and Findlay joined with the start of the 1995-96 school year.

Sylvania Northview left at the end of the 1996 football season to join the NLL when Lake left for the SLL.

Sandusky was approved to join with the start of the 1997-98 school year, but Napoleon left at the end of the 1996-97 school year.

Lorain Admiral King and Lorain Southview joined at the start of the 2000-2001 school year, but left after one year.

Fostoria left for the Northern Ohio League in all sports but football at the start of the 2002-03 school year. Fostoria joined the NOL in football one year later.

For the GLL's final year of existence in the 2002-03 school year, the members were Clay, Findlay, Fremont Ross, Napoleon, Sandusky, and Whitmer. Clay and Whitmer had accepted an invitation to join the Toledo City League for the following school year, and the league would not continue with four members. The Greater Buckeye Conference was created for the 2003-04 school year, which brought Findlay, Fremont Ross, and Sandusky back with former Buckeye Conference member Marion Harding, while Napoleon remained and Lima Senior joined.

=== All-time membership of the Great Lakes League (1956-2003) ===
- Temperance (MI) Bedford Mules (1961–2000)
- Bowling Green Bobcats (1956–1960, 1969–1978)
- Oregon Clay Eagles (1956–2003)
- Findlay Trojans (1995–2003)
- Fostoria Redmen (1956–2002)
- Fremont Ross Little Giants (1991–2003)
- Lima Shawnee Indians (1980–1982)
- Lorain Admiral King Admirals (2000–2001)
- Lorain Southview Saints (2000–2001)
- Napoleon Wildcats (1978–1997, 2002–2003)
- Port Clinton Redskins (1963–1980)
- Sandusky Blue Streaks (1997–2003)
- Sylvania/Sylvania Northview Wildcats (1956–1996)
- Toledo Rogers Rams (1956–1966)
- Toledo Whitmer Panthers (1956–1969, 1982–2003)

== The brief GBC years ==
The GBC was created in fall of 2003 with Findlay, Fremont Ross, Lima Senior, Marion Harding, Napoleon, and Sandusky as the inaugural members, after the GLL ceased to exist.

In June 2009, Napoleon accepted an invitation to join the Northern Lakes League while Sandusky was accepted into the Northern Ohio League. Both began competition in their new conferences in 2011 after citing tedious league travel as a reason for wanting to leave. In August 2009, Findlay, Lima, and later on, Fremont Ross all applied for membership in the Toledo City League. After a league vote on October 13, Fremont Ross was invited to join the City League in 2011, but Findlay and Lima were turned down.

On May 24, 2010, representatives from Findlay and Lima Senior high schools met with the non-TPS members of the Toledo City League to discuss possibly forming a new conference no sooner than 2011. This came after Toledo Public considered cutting junior high, freshmen, and less popular sports from their budget in order to ease their $39 million deficit. This new league would become a valid setup starting in 2011 as the Three Rivers Athletic Conference. Findlay and Lima Senior joined the TRAC right away, leaving Marion Harding without a league affiliation for 2011-12.

Year	Football Champions
2003	Marion Harding
2004	Findlay, Napoleon
2005	Findlay
2006	Fremont Ross
2007	Napoleon
2008	Findlay
2009	Findlay, Napoleon, Sandusky
2010	Fremont Ross

== See also ==
- Ohio High School Athletic Conferences
