= Central Catholic High School (Toledo, Ohio) =

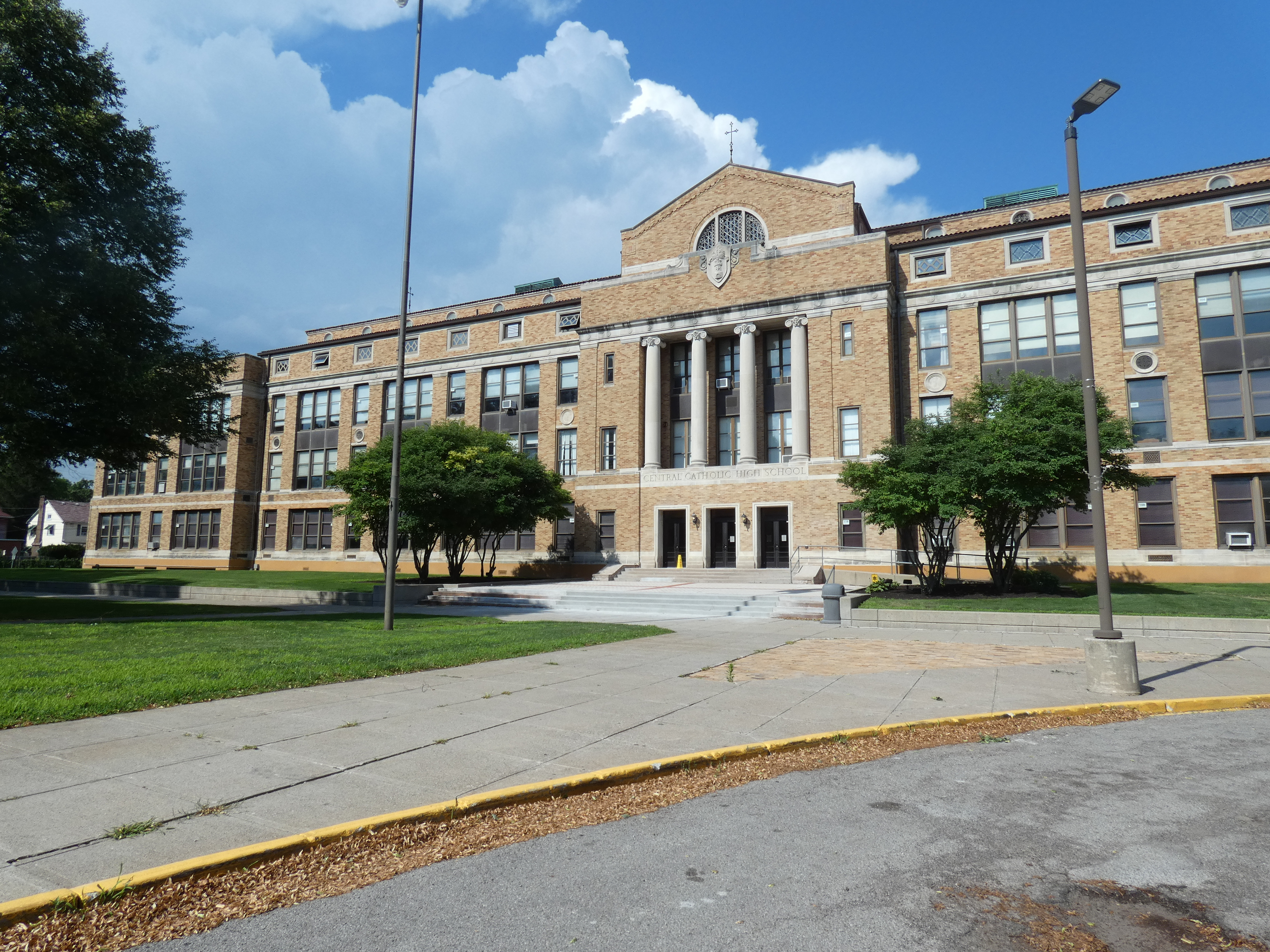
- School's main entrance

Location
- 2550 Cherry Street; Toledo, (Lucas County), Ohio 43608; United States; 41°40′24″N 83°32′36″W

Information
- Type: Private, Co-educational
- Motto: "Dominus Dominantium" ("Lord of Lords")
- Religious affiliation: Roman Catholic
- Established: 1919
- Oversight: Roman Catholic Diocese of Toledo
- President: Kevin Parkins
- Chaplain: Father Kevin Moebius
- Teaching staff: 85
- Grades: 9–12
- Enrollment: 600
- Colors: Scarlet and gray
- Athletics: 24 Varsity sports
- Athletics conference: Catholic High School League
- Mascot: Leprechaun
- Accreditation: North Central Association of Colleges and Schools
- Newspaper: The Centric
- Yearbook: The Centripetal
- Website: centralcatholic.org

Central Catholic High School is a Catholic, co-educational, college prep secondary school in Toledo, Ohio. It is operated by the Roman Catholic Diocese of Toledo and is the largest Catholic high school in the area. CCHS was founded as Cathedral High School in 1919, with its name change in 1920. The school, which is located one mile northwest of Downtown Toledo, offers two possible degrees: honors or college prep. It has received two School of Excellence Awards and the Drug Prevention Award.

== School Body ==
Central Catholic currently has an enrollment of 600 students. 72.11% of the students at CCHS are White, 24.14% are Black, 3.41% are Hispanic, 0.24% are Asian/Pacific Islander, and .08% are American Indian/Alaskan. There are 85 classroom teachers with a student-teacher ratio of 14.45.

== School trademarks ==
=== School colors ===
The school colors are scarlet and gray, along with featuring a green shamrock representing the school's nickname of Fighting Irish.

== Kress Family Library ==
Open from 7:30 a.m. to 5:00 p.m. daily, the library features over 8,000 reference, fiction, and non-fiction circulating books, an automated library catalog, daily newspapers, a periodical collection and archives, video/DVD and CD collections, database access, A/V equipment and support, professional education print resources, 17 student computer workstations, and 30 laptop workstations.

=== Moon Room ===
Adjacent to the Kress Family Library is the "Moon Room", which contains a piece of lunar rock from the Apollo 11 mission, whose flight director was Gene Kranz, an alumnus of the school. The exhibit was dedicated on December 6, 2007, and includes the Moon rock, a wide array of wall-sized photographs, scaled-down model rockets, and many books regarding space and history — all of which were donated by Gene Kranz himself.

== Performing Arts ==
Central Catholic's musical opportunities include Glee Club, Freshmen Mixed Chorus, Irish Marching Band, Concert Band, String Orchestra, Pit Orchestra, as well as piano classes. CCHS has performed 97 consecutive years of musicals and operettas dating back to 1930. The annual spring musical is held in the 901-seat Valentine Theatre in the downtown district of Toledo. The annual Sounds of Christmas also takes place inside the Valentine Theatre, where all programs of the musical department perform a holiday concert. A fall play and winter concert are performed annually.

== Athletics ==
In Athletics, Central Catholic's nickname is the Fighting Irish. Their colors are scarlet and gray.

They were a member of the Toledo City League from 1928 to 2011 and then joined the new Three Rivers Athletic Conference (TRAC) in the fall of 2011. In 2021, along with the other parochial members of the TRAC, the school announced they would be joining the Michigan-based Catholic High School League at the start of fall 2023.

The biggest rivals for the Irish include fellow parochial schools St. John's Jesuit and St. Francis de Sales in boys' sports, and St. Ursula Academy and Notre Dame Academy in girls' sports.

Other rivalries include the Whitmer Panthers.

=== Gallagher Athletic Complex ===
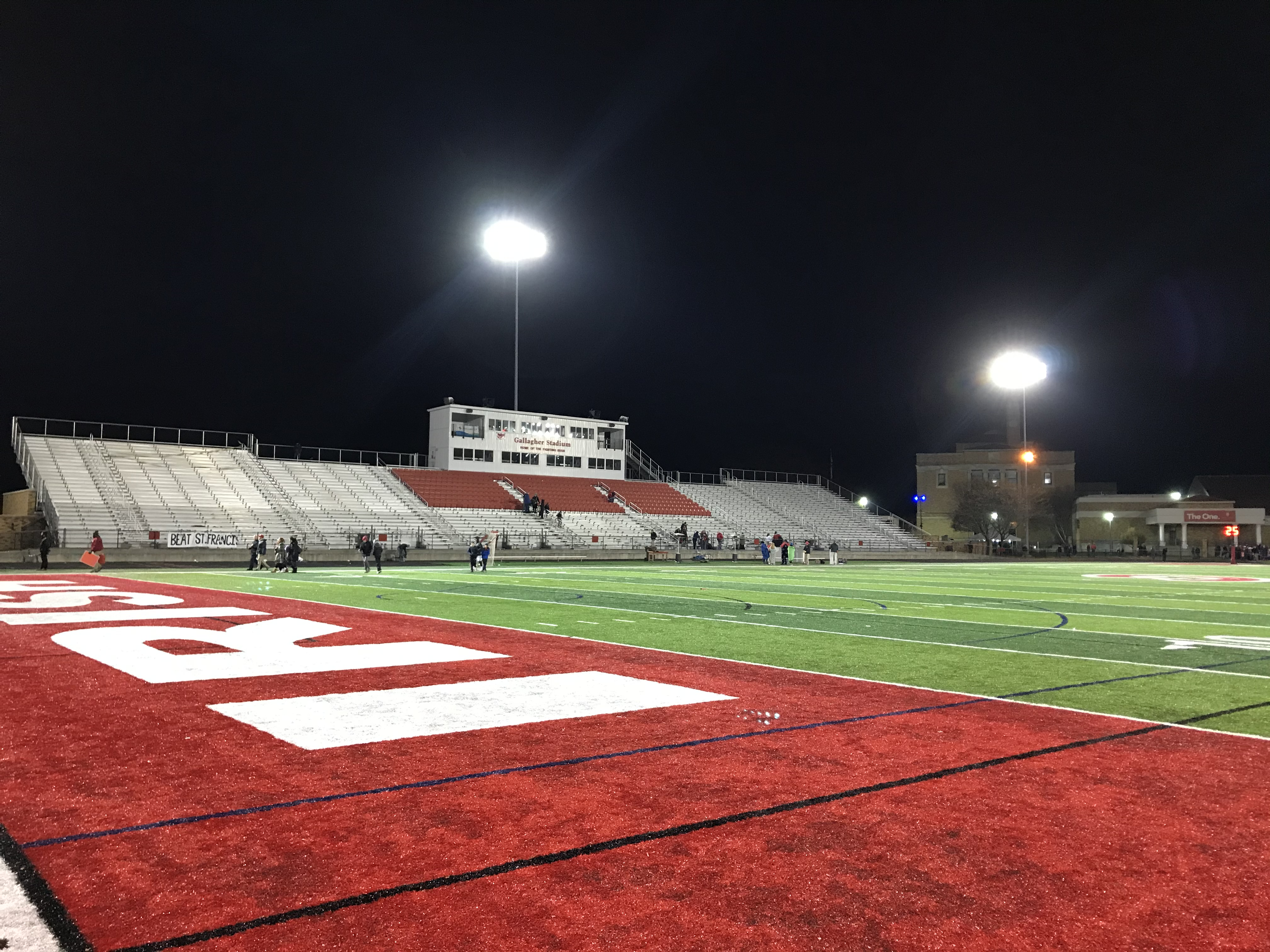
Gallagher Athletic Complex

This facility was blessed and dedicated at a ceremony on October 9, 1998. Charles and Diane (Bertling) Gallagher, 1956 and 1958 CCHS graduates, were presented a wooden replica of the bronze dedication plaque that is permanently placed in the Athletic Complex. The complex consists of a track, football and soccer field, and permanent seats for spectators. The Fighting Irish varsity football team played its first home game at the complex on September 25, 2004, coming away with a homecoming victory.

==== Renovations ====
The stadium received a complete overhaul renovation in 2007. The new stadium includes permanent seating for 6,500 spectators and FieldTurf for its playing surface. Also included in the renovation was a state-of-the-art weight room, a home locker room equipped with 3 flat-screen TVs, coach's offices, and a team meeting room all located under the home side bleachers. It was constructed on the site of the existing complex and includes a full press box with hospitality suites that accommodates 120 people. A 450-seat stadium club section with chair-back seats is located at midfield on the home side. Construction began in the spring of 2007 and was complete in time for the 2007 homecoming game.

In 2018, more renovations took place, including the replacement of the field turf and the resurfacing of the track.

=== Sullivan Center ===
The ground breaking for the Sullivan Center was in the spring of 1996. In the fall of 1997, the center was officially opened with a Mass led by Bishop Hoffman. The center holds 3,000 people, making it the largest high school field house in Northwest Ohio. The Sullivan Center includes a 3,000 seat capacity for convocation events, a 2,800 seat capacity for athletic events, one main court and two recreational cross courts, a 600-foot interior jogging track, four concession areas, six locker rooms, and a meeting room with a seating capacity for over 100 people.

==== Renovations ====
2009, the Sullivan Center installed a new gym floor.

2017, a brand new four-sided, hanging scoreboard was installed.

2021, the gym floor was replaced and upgraded for a third different court since its inception.

2022, the Sullivan Center underwent a complete remodel as new state-of-the-art bleachers were installed, along with another new court.

=== Mercy Field ===
Mercy Field is home to the Central Catholic High School baseball team, and it opened in the spring of 2012. 1982 Central Catholic alumnus, Cleves Delp, donated $2.5 million to build Mercy Field. The stadium features an all-turf field with a clay mound and 12-foot outfield fence, and the field is lighted for night games. It has bleacher seating for 440, dugouts, a two-mound bullpen on each side, a 10-inning scoreboard, a press box with radio and TV booth, and an owner's viewing suite. The structure also includes a concession stand, locker room, player's study room, coach's office, and indoor hitting room.

Mercy Field was named the Midwest Field of the Year by the National High School Baseball Association in 2012.

Lourdes University, a NAIA Division II program, also takes advantage of Central Catholic's facility, using it for their home games.

=== Ohio High School Athletic Association State Championships ===
Central Catholic has won 9 team state championships.

- Football: 2023, 2022, 2014, 2012, 2005, 1962
- Boys Golf: 1930
- Boys Track & Field : 1997
- Girls Volleyball: 2007

=== The Irish Knight ===
The Irish Knight is awarded to the winner of the Central Catholic High School and St. Francis de Sales High School football game. The winning school receives and hosts the Irish Knight trophy in their school, along with bragging rights. CCHS has won the last 20 contests, including a 62-0 victory in 2023. The Irish Knight series is led by the Fighting Irish 35-28-1. There has only been one overtime game, which occurred in 2003.

== Notable alumni ==
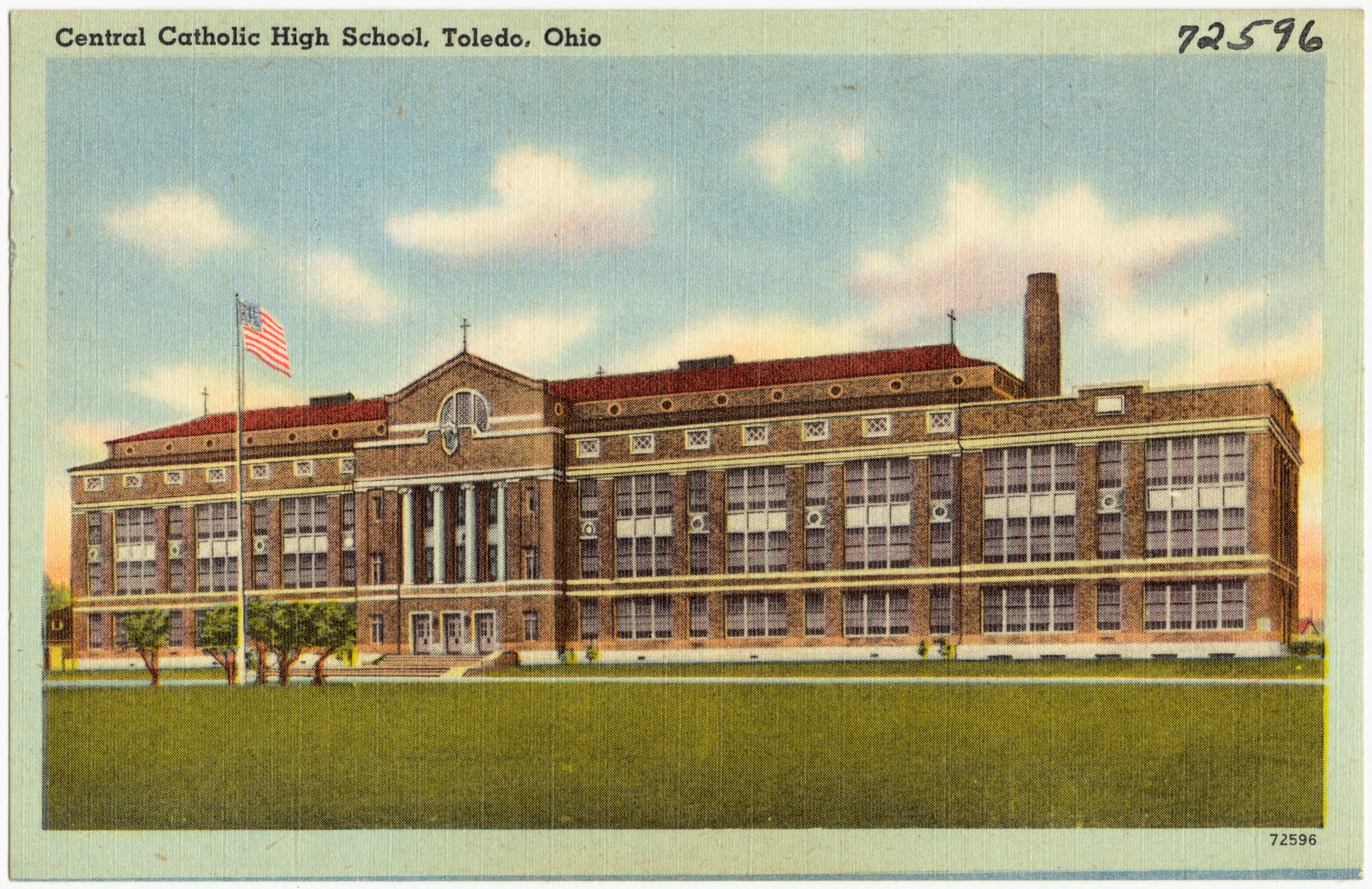
A postcard featuring the main building

- Deborah Agosti (1969), Justice of the Supreme Court in Nevada
- Joe Amstutz (1953), former NFL offensive lineman
- JoJuan Armour (1995), retired National Football League (NFL) and Canadian Football League (CFL) player
- Tom Beutler (1964), former NFL linebacker
- Casey Biggs (1973), actor
- Brad Cousino (1971), retired NFL player; Was a first-team All-American college football player at Miami University, also a two-time Mid-American Conference Defensive Player of the Year.
- Don Donoher (1950), former NCAA Division I college basketball head coach for the Dayton Flyers from 1964 until 1989
- Ashley Frazier (2008), professional volleyball player for Bangkok Glass VC
- Larry Fuller (pianist) (1983), jazz pianist
- Frank Gilhooley (c. 1910), professional baseball player and father of Frankie Gilhooley
- Frankie Gilhooley (1942), professional basketball player, long-time Toledo Mud Hens announcer, and son of Frank Gilhooley
- Eric Herman (2008), former NFL offensive lineman for the New York Giants and Baltimore Ravens
- James Hudson (2017), NFL offensive lineman for the New England Patriots
- Jim Joyce (1973), retired Major League Baseball umpire known for missing an 'out' call at first base, costing Armando Galarraga's near-perfect game of the Detroit Tigers on June 2, 2010
- Dick Kinzel (1958), former CEO and President of Cedar Fair Entertainment Company
- DeShone Kizer (2014), NFL quarterback
- Gene Kranz (1951), NASA assistant flight director for Project Mercury and flight director for the Gemini, Apollo and Space Shuttle programs
- Joe Kruzel (1984), professional baseball coach
- Ryne Robinson (2003), former NFL wide receiver and kick returner for the Carolina Panthers
- Dane Sanzenbacher (2007), former NFL wide receiver for the Chicago Bears and Cincinnati Bengals
- Ned Skeldon (1942), former Toledo politician; he was the driving force behind bringing a baseball team to Toledo, Ohio in 1965, the Toledo Mud Hens.
- Keith Towbridge (2013), tight end in the NFL
- Michael Warren II (2017), NFL running back for the Detroit Lions
- Mary Zilba (1981), Miss Ohio 1987; national Canadian recording artist, garnering six top 20 hits; main cast member in the show The Real Housewives of Vancouver
