= Napoleon High School (Ohio) =

Location
- 701 Briarheath Drive; Napoleon, (Henry County), Ohio 43545; United States
- Coordinates: 41°23′25″N 84°8′50″W

Information
- Type: Public, Coeducational high school
- Established: 1921
- School district: Napoleon Area City School District
- Superintendent: Erik Belcher
- Chairperson: Tallon Meyer
- Principal: Brian Burden
- Teaching staff: 52.23 (FTE)
- Grades: 7-12
- Student to teacher ratio: 14.55
- Colors: Navy and White
- Athletics conference: Northern Lakes League
- Sports: Soccer, Football, Volleyball, Cross Country, Water Polo, Golf, Tennis, Swimming, Diving, Basketball, Track, Bowling, Baseball, Softball, Cheerleading, Gymnastics, E-Sports
- Mascot: Winston the Wildcat
- Team name: Wildcats
- Rival: Defiance High School Bulldogs
- Athletic Director: Andy Ham
- Website: http://www.napoleonareaschools.org/

Napoleon High School is a public high school in Napoleon, Ohio. It is the only high school in the Napoleon Area City School District. Their nickname is the Wildcats. They are a member of the Northern Lakes League.

== Academics ==
The Napoleon school district once held an "Excellent" rating from the old report card of the Ohio Department of Education, which was used prior to 2015, including an "Excellent with Distinction" rating for the high school.

== Band ==
Director: Andrew Lesick

The school houses 4 bands at Napoleon High School. The Marching Band, Symphonic Band, Jazz Band, and Pep Band. The Marching Band entertains during the halftime of every football game. The Symphonic band has three concerts each year. The Jazz Band specializes in Swing, Latin, and other more difficult forms of music. They play at each concert and also at special events. The Pep band entertains the basketball crowd at each home basketball game.

== Clubs ==
Drama/Thespian Society, Spanish Club, PAWS, French Club, Roar, National Honor Society, Exchange Students, Speech Team, Quiz Team, Jazz Choir, Envirothon, DECA, HI-OY, and Student Council

== History of the Wildcats ==
By: David Addington

Through the early 1930s, the Napoleon High School athletic teams were known as the “Little Corporals.” Then, when Scotty Florence took over as coach in the fall of 1937, the Napoleon teams became unofficially known as the “Fighting Scots” or “Scots.” In the late summer of 1940, Napoleon put together a search committee to select a new name or mascot for NHS athletic teams. Cliff Nelson, who had been coach at Swanton, came to Napoleon to guide the football squad that fall. The search lasted three weeks and the committee voted 4–2 to accept the nomination of “Wildcats” submitted by Dick Speiser. He was awarded the $3 prize. Coaches in the 1930s included Carl Adams, Rex Burke, and John Cuff. Florence then was the coach for three years before being replaced by Cliff Nelson. After three more seasons, Nelson gave way to Joe Ayers. However, Nelson returned to coach Napoleon's son of the gridiron through 1946–47. Then in the fall of 1948, a young, handsome Swanton native by way of BGSU and in the U.S. paratroopers who fought in the Battle of the Bulge, Charlie Buckenmeyer, would come on to become a living legend. From 1948 through 1977, with time out for another stint in the U.S. Army (1951) Bucky became only the second man to rule the Great Maumee Valley, the other being General Anthony Wayne. Buckenmeyer and the Wildcats become synonymous with football excellence. In 29 seasons, Napoleon won 209 games and 17 times the wildcats were unbeaten or lost just once. During the span, Napoleon won 18 Northwest Ohio Athletic League championships Since 1977, Napoleon has seen six men guide the Wildcat grid fortunes... Don Morrison, Hip Klotz, Lynn Schrickel, Mike Burke, John Snoad, Tory Strock, and now Tyler Swary. Napoleon has state championships in both girls and boys basketball as well as numerous individual state champs in various sports.

== Athletics ==
=== Ohio High School Athletic Association State Championships ===
- Boys Basketball – 1981
- Boys Cross Country – 2000
- Girls Basketball — 2021
- Girls Cross Country – 2003
- Girls Bowling - 2026

=== Other athletic accomplishments ===
- Girls Basketball state Final Four - 2020, Final Four was Cancelled due to Covid. The girls were Undefeated that season until the game was cancelled
- Boys Water Polo* state champions - 1980, 1983, 1984, 1991
- Girls Water Polo* state champions - 1996, 1997, 1998, 1999, 2017

* Sponsored by Ohio High School Swim Coaches' Association.

- Boys Diving State Champions - 2007

=== Northern Lakes League championships (2011-) ===
- Boys Basketball: 2012
- Girls Basketball: 2020, 2021
- Boys Swimming: 2012, 2013, 2014, 2015
- Football: 2012
- Wrestling: 2018, 2024

=== Greater Buckeye Conference championships (2003-2011) ===
- Baseball: 2011
- Boys Soccer: 2003, 2005*
- Boys Swimming: 2003, 2004, 2005, 2006, 2007, 2008, 2009, 2010, 2011
- Football: 2004*, 2007, 2009*

Softball: 2006, 2007, 2008

=== Great Lakes League championships (1978-1997, 2002-2003) ===
- Football: 1981*

=== NWOAL championships (1926-1978) ===
- Football: 1926, 1927, 1929, 1941*, 1947, 1949, 1951*, 1955, 1956*, 1957, 1958, 1960, 1961, 1963, 1965*, 1966, 1967, 1969*, 1970, 1971, 1972, 1973, 1975, 1976
- Boys Cross Country: 1969, 1970, 1971
- Golf: 1956, 1957, 1958, 1959, 1961, 1965, 1966, 1968, 1969, 1970, 1971, 1972, 1975, 1977
- Boys Basketball: 1926–27, 1927–28, 1931–32, 1937-38*, 1947–48, 1952–53, 1959–60, 1960–61, 1961-62*, 1962–63, 1963-64*, 1969–70, 1970–71, 1971–72, 1972-73
- Wrestling: 1960–61, 1961–62, 1962–63, 1963–64, 1965–66, 1966–67, 1967–68, 1968–69, 1969–70, 1971–72, 1972–73, 1975-76*
- Baseball: 1963, 1967*, 1970*, 1971*, 1972*, 1974*, 1978
- Boys Track & Field: 1928, 1929, 1949, 1950, 1952, 1956, 1960, 1962, 1964, 1966*, 1967, 1968, 1969, 1971, 1972, 1976, 1977
- Girls Track & Field: 1972, 1977, 1978, 2013

Note: shared league titles are denoted with an asterisk (*)
