= St. Francis de Sales School (Toledo, Ohio) =

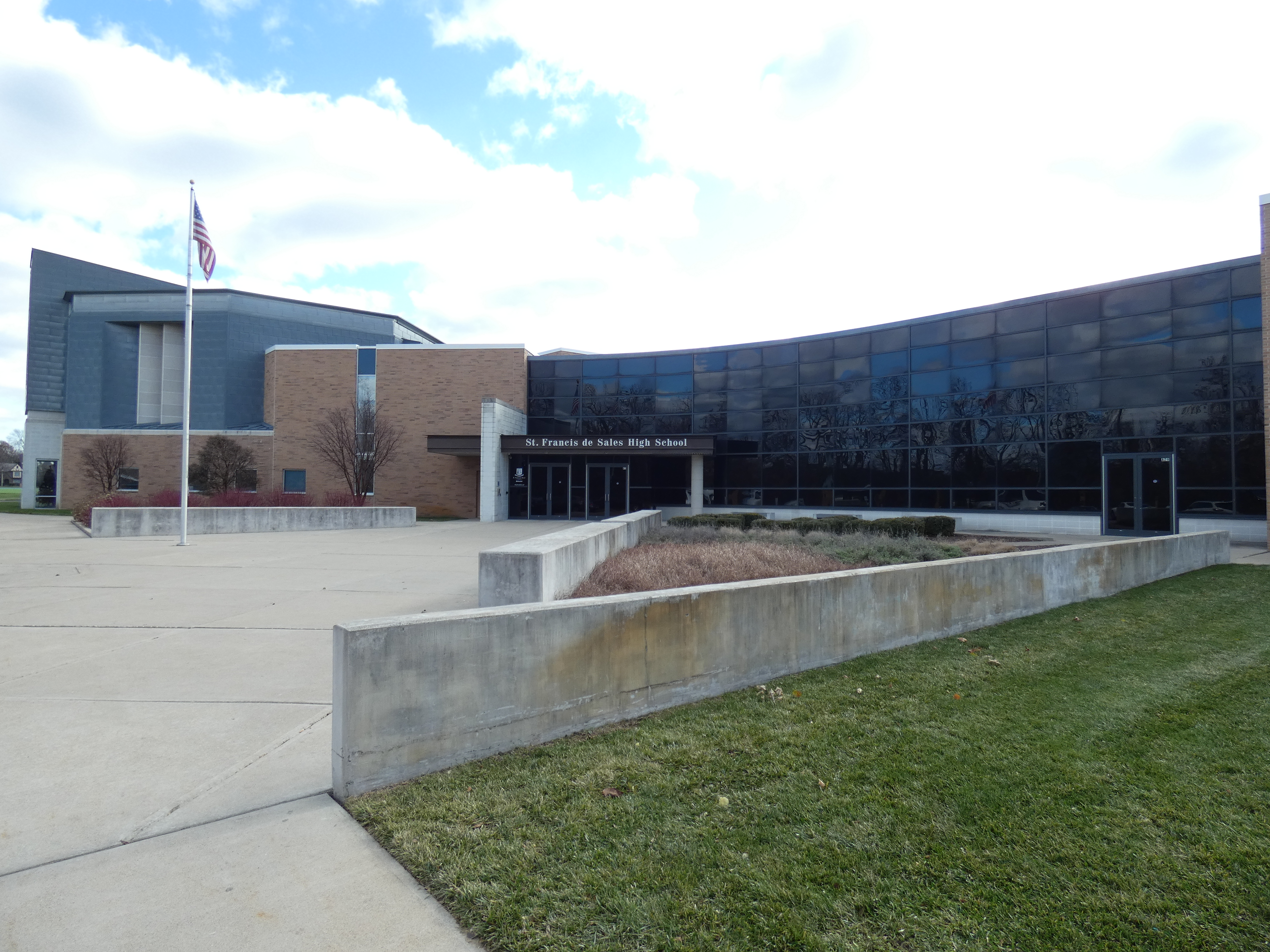
- School's main entrance

Location
- 2323 West Bancroft Street; Toledo, (Lucas County), Ohio 43607-1306; United States; 41.66329°N 83.59546°W

Information
- Type: private, all-male, college-preparatory
- Motto: Suaviter et Fortiter (Gently but Firmly)
- Established: September 14, 1955
- President: Fr. Joe Newman, OSFS '03
- Principal: Mr. John Hall '02
- Grades: 7–12
- Enrollment: 659 (2024)
- Colors: Red & Blue
- Athletics conference: Catholic High School League
- Mascot: Knight
- Rivals: Central Catholic Irish; St. John's Titans
- Accreditation: Ohio Catholic School Accrediting Association
- Newspaper: Lance
- Yearbook: Accolade
- Affiliations: O.S.F.S.
- Website: http://www.sfsknights.org

St. Francis de Sales School is a private, all-male, college-preparatory school in Toledo, Ohio. It is located within the Roman Catholic Diocese of Toledo. The school was named as one of the top 20 Catholic high schools in the nation for academics by Catholic High School Honor Roll for two consecutive years in 2005 and 2006.

== About the school ==
St. Francis de Sales High School is a college preparatory school run by the Oblates of St. Francis de Sales, a religious congregation of the Roman Catholic Church. The school opened on September 14, 1955, as the greater Toledo area's second college-preparatory high school, and, as of August 2015, added grades seven and eight. The school's athletic teams have won 29 official and unofficial state championships in football, basketball, tennis, wrestling, swimming and diving, water polo, and hockey, as well as numerous State Runners-Up, Regional Titles, District Titles and City League Titles. The AquaKnight swim team's 42-year district title streak (53 titles, total) is the 2nd longest winning streak in any high school sport in the nation behind Cedar Rapids Washington boys swim team's 46 consecutive district titles. Named after Saint Francis de Sales, the community has been described as a family-like group and has an active alumni base both in the city of Toledo and throughout the country. The mascot is the Knight.

=== Campus ===
The campus of St. Francis is located on twenty-five acres. The campus includes an eight-lane swimming pool, an eight-lane track, baseball field, football fields and a soccer field. In 2005, the school introduced a $14 million renovation/addition. In the renovation/addition, St. Francis built a new chapel, arts wing, fitness/weight room and new locker rooms. The school is located in a historic area of Toledo, on Bancroft Street, just one-half mile from the University of Toledo.

In the fall of 2012, the Student Achievement Center was added to the school. The addition included 2,500 square feet of space for tutoring, a computer lab, and private meeting rooms for students.

=== School body ===
There are 600+ students. There are 56 faculty members, which results in a student-teacher ratio of 13:1. Six teachers have their Ph.D., and 28 have their master's degree. St. Francis draws students from all around Northwest Ohio and Southeast Michigan. Most of the students attended Catholic grade schools, although approximately 15-20% come from public schools.

=== Admission and tuition ===
Freshmen are accepted on the basis of a placement examination with regard to the recommendation of their grade school. Transfer students are accepted on an individual basis after consideration of their high school transcripts. Academic and need-based financial aid is readily available.

Tuition and fees for 2024-25 vary based on student's grade; $12,450 for grades 7-8 and $15,500 for grades 9–12, with an added $350 fee for grade 12.

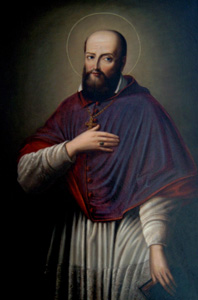
St. Francis de Sales, the gentleman saint and patron of St. Francis de Sales High School

== Spirituality ==
St. Francis offers various levels of retreat programs for its students. All freshmen and sophomores participate in daylong retreats which are carefully structured and planned for their age-level interests and concerns. Juniors and seniors are required to participate in at least one approved retreat experience during the 11th or 12th grade year. In addition, students are required to take eight semesters of Theology, and at least 30 service hours both Junior and Senior year are required for graduation.

In 2005, St. Francis invested in a new chapel facing the front of the school, where throughout the school year, all students are encouraged to participate in mass. These include opening school, Thanksgiving, and holy day liturgies; days of recollection; reconciliation services; etc.

== Academics ==
There are eight academic departments: Catholic Theology, English, Foreign Language, Mathematics, Science, Social Studies, Applied and Fine Arts, and Health & Physical Education. Every student at St. Francis is required to take a core program of 4 years of English, religion, math, and science (including 2 basic lab sciences from biology, chemistry, physics); 2.5 years of physical education and health; 3 years of social studies; 2 years of a foreign language (3 years highly recommended); 1 year of basic art; and 0.5 year of computer science.

In addition to academic requirements, all students are encouraged to participate in service projects. Formal projects, approved by the Christian Service Department, are a requirement for the sophomore, junior, and senior classes.

== Athletics ==
In athletics, the Knights had been long members of the Toledo City League before joining the Three Rivers Athletic Conference in 2011. In 2023, the Knights joined the Catholic High School League. The school's colors are red and blue. Their athletic rivals include the neighboring all-boys school St. John's Jesuit and area Co-Ed Central Catholic.

Knight Swimming and Diving, as well as Water Polo, stand out in the athletic venue. Known locally as the "AquaKnights," the swim team placed second in the state for three out of five years (2010, 2011, 2014). The swim team has a particularly strong history, winning 42 straight Northwest Ohio District Championships beginning in 1966 spanning until their defeat by rival St. John's in February 2008, a national record. The AquaKnights have a well-known rivalry with Cincinnati St. Xaiver. The Water Polo team has consistently placed in the top four teams in the state for the last ten years, and secured the state title in 2023.

=== Ohio High School Athletic Association State Championships ===
The St. Francis Knights hold more state titles than any other Catholic school in the Diocese of Toledo, and any other high school in the greater Toledo area with 29 State Championships.

- Football - 1984, 2001
- Wrestling - 1964,1970
- Basketball – 1983
- Swimming – 1967, 1968, 1996, 1998
- Ice Hockey – 2011, 2015, 2021

=== Other State Championships ===
- Water Polo - 1973, 1974, 1975, 1982, 1986, 1988, 1989, 1990, 1995, 1996, 1997, 1998, 1999, 2001, 2023
- Tennis - 2001, 2002

=== Soccer ===
The 2003 soccer team were the Division I runner up, compiling a final record of 20–1–1, with their only loss coming in the state finals. Head coach John B. Orozco earned coach of the year honors that same year.

=== The Irish Knight ===
The Irish Knight is awarded to the winner of the Central Catholic High School and St. Francis de Sales High School football game. The winning school receives and hosts the Irish Knight in their school, along with bragging rights.

CCHS currently holds the Irish Knight after winning this past fall, and leads the series 36–28–1. There has only been one overtime game, which occurred in 2003.

=== All-Sports Trophy ===
Since 1974, when the All-Sports Trophy was introduced, the Knights of St. Francis de Sales High School have held or shared the trophy ten times. They held the trophy in 1975, 1983, 1984, 1987, 1992, 1994, 2001, and 2005, and they shared with St. John's Jesuit in 2000 and 2002.

== Alma Mater ==
(Sung to the tune of the Finlandia hymn)

== Notable alumni ==
- Gerry Bamman, actor; known for playing Uncle Frank in the Christmas movie, Home Alone
- Sean B. Carroll, evolutionary developmental biologist, author, educator, and executive producer
- Earl K. Fernandes, Bishop of Columbus, Ohio, author, exorcist
- Dr. Kevin Granata, Virginia Tech professor in biomedics field; killed in Virginia Tech massacre in April 2007
- Marty Huff, American football player, linebacker for the Michigan Wolverines and San Francisco 49ers
- Chet Jastremski, competition swimmer and Olympian; broke two world records in the breaststroke while swimming at Indiana University
- Wade Kapszukiewicz, Mayor of Toledo, Ohio
- Zach McClellan, pitcher for the Colorado Rockies
- Michael S. Witherell, particle physicist and president of Fermilab
