= Lima Senior High School =

Location
- 1 Spartan Way; Lima, Ohio 45801-4561; United States; 40°44′29″N 84°5′47″W

Information
- Type: Public
- Established: 1955
- School district: Lima City School District
- Grades: 9–12
- Enrollment: 1,000 (2023–2024)
- Campus type: Urban
- Colors: Scarlet and Gray
- Athletics conference: Toledo City League
- Team name: Spartans
- Accreditation: Ohio Department of Education
- Website: http://www.limacityschools.org

Lima Senior High School, the only high school in the Lima City Schools District, was established in 1955, in Lima, Ohio. There are approximately 1,500 students currently enrolled at Lima Senior.

== Overview ==
Lima Senior remained in the same building for 49 years until a new building was constructed over two years and completed in 2004. The new Lima Senior High School building contained three small learning communities, consisting of the Performance Based School, the Progressive Academy, and the School of Multiple Intelligences. Each small school followed an instructional model of teaching core subjects of Ohio class requirements. As of the 2013-14 school year, Lima Senior High School has transitioned into a single institution, dissolving the three small schools. Spartan Stadium, home to the Lima Senior Spartans, is a registered historic building listed in the National Register on 2002-03-21.

In 1987, Lima Senior High School began formally recognizing the accomplishments of its alumni who had received local, state or national recognition for achievements in their occupational fields, made significant contributions to society, or performed meritorious service for our country by inducting them into the Lima Senior High School Distinguished Alumni Hall of Fame. In 1990 the Hall of Fame was opened up to all students in the Lima City School District and the name was changed to the Lima City Schools Distinguished Hall of Fame. There are currently 87 alumni honored in the Hall of Fame. Every four years, ten to fifteen outstanding alumni are inducted into the Hall of Fame during an induction ceremony and banquet. All Hall of Fame inductees have their portraits displayed in Lima Senior Highschool's cafeteria.

Lima Senior's mascot is the Spartan. They are members of the Toledo City League. Sports consist of football, cross country, boys and girls soccer, volleyball, boys and girls basketball, wrestling, boys and girls swimming, indoor and outdoor track, baseball, boys and girls bowling, and boys and girls lacrosse.

== Athletics ==
=== State championships ===
- Baseball - 1964
- Football – 1996

=== Athletic League Affiliations ===
- Greater Miami Conference: 1980-2000
- Independent: 2000-2003
- Greater Buckeye Conference: 2003-2011
- Three Rivers Athletic Conference: 2011–2023
- Toledo City League: 2023–Present

== Music ==
Lima Senior has maintained a full arts department in the high school. The music department has several musical ensembles, and students within those ensembles participate in honors choirs and bands annually. The high school has a marching band, symphonic band, concert band, pep band, and jazz band. The Orchestra Department has two orchestras, the Red Orchestra and a Gray Orchestra. The Choral Department includes the Masterworks Ensemble, the Men's Chorus, and the Women's Chorus. Other performing choirs are the Scarlet and Gray Show Choir, and The Spartanaires, the Spartets, and the Spartones. All groups in the music department are by audition only, at the discretion of the individual directors.

== Notable alumni ==
- Tom Barrington, Former NFL running back
- Greg Simpson, McDonald's All-American Basketball Player
- Phyllis Diller (Central High School Class of 1935), comedian and film actress
- William Howard, NFL running back
- Sue W. Kelly, U.S. Representative from 1995 to 2007
- Bob King, Olympic athlete
- Gary Moeller, former University of Michigan football coach
- Jarrod Pughsley, NFL O-Linemen
- Travis Walton, 2009 Big Ten Defensive Player of the Year, played in 2009 NCAA Men's Basketball Championship for Michigan State
- William White, football Player, started in Super Bowl XXXIII for the Atlanta Falcons
- Jeff Mullen, D-1 football coach
- Charles Deitrick - Ohio Northern Football Star
- Zavier Simpson - Ohio Mr. Basketball, NBA player
