= Northern Lakes League =

High school athletics conference in Northwest Ohio

The Northern Lakes League (NLL), is an OHSAA high school athletic conference that was formed in 1956 and comprises twelve high schools in Northwest Ohio.

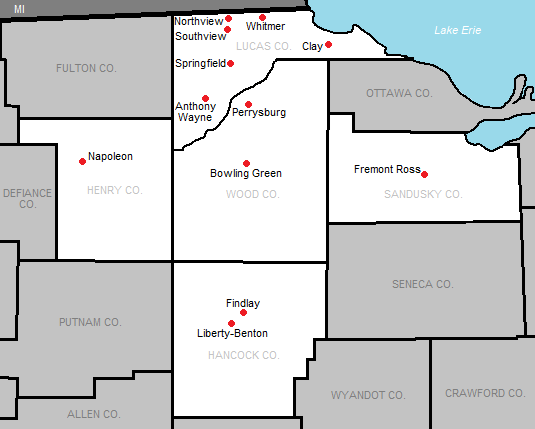
Map of current NLL members for the 2026-2027 school year.

== Current members ==
School	Nickname	Location	Colors	Type	Enrollment	Enrollment (CB/FB 2024)	State FB Region (2024)	Middle school(s)	Joined League	Notes
Anthony Wayne	Generals	Whitehouse	Blue, White	Public	1,308	515	2:6	Anthony Wayne JHS	1956	
Bowling Green	Bobcats	Bowling Green	Red, Gray	Public	838	352	3:10	Bowling Green JHS	1978	
Clay	Eagles	Oregon	Green, Yellow	Public	874	435	2:6	Fassett JHS	2023	
Findlay	Trojans	Findlay	Blue, Gold	Public	1,175	638	1:1	Donnell MS, Glenwood MS	2023	
Fremont Ross	Little Giants	Fremont	Purple, White	Public	853	403	2:6	Fremont MS	2023	
Liberty-Benton	Eagles	Findlay	Blue, White and Red	Public	543	187	5:18	Liberty-Benton MS	2026	
Napoleon	Wildcats	Napoleon	Navy, White	Public	548	256	4:14	Napoleon MS	2011	
Northview	Wildcats	Sylvania	Black, Yellow,	Public	1,394	494	2:6	Arbor Hills JHS, McCord JHS	1996	
Perrysburg	Yellow Jackets	Perrysburg	Black, Old Gold	Public	1,568	681	1:1	Perrysburg JHS	1956	
Southview	Cougars	Sylvania	Orange, Brown	Public	1,061	429	2:6	Arbor Hills JHS, McCord JHS, Timberstone JHS	1976	
Springfield	Blue Devils	Holland	Blue, White	Public	1,003	407	2:6	Springfield MS	1962	
Whitmer	Panthers	Toledo	Maize, Blue	Public	1,625	883	1:1	Jefferson JHS, Washington JHS	2023	

== Former members ==
School	Nickname	Location	Colors	Type	Membership Tenure	Notes
Eastwood	Eagles	Pemberville	Red, White, Columbia	Public	1959–1972	Left for the SLL, now in the NBC
Elmwood	Royals	Bloomdale	Royal Blue, White	Public	1960–1972	Left for the SLL, now in the BVC
Genoa	Comets	Genoa	Maroon, Gray	Public	1956–1972	Left for the SLL, now in the NBC
Lake	Flyers	Millbury	Navy, White, Columbia	Public	1960–1996	Left for the SLL, now in the NBC
Maumee	Panthers	Maumee	Purple, Gold	Public	1956-2023	Left for the NBC
Port Clinton	Redskins	Port Clinton	Red, White	Public	1956–1963	Left for the GLL, now in the NOC
Rossford	Bulldogs	Rossford	Maroon, Gray	Public	1956–2011	Left for the NBC

== League history ==
=== 1950s ===
- The Great Northern Conference had been created in 1945 with Oregon Clay, Maumee, Perrysburg, Rossford, Sylvania and Toledo Whitmer as its charter members. Anthony Wayne would join them in 1953. League expansion was brought up in 1956 as Bowling Green, Fostoria, Swanton, Oak Harbor, Genoa, Lake, Port Clinton, Toledo Rogers and Holland were considered for membership. The GNC eventually grew and split into two divisions based on size— Orange: (Bowling Green, Clay, Fostoria, Toledo Rogers, Sylvania, and Toledo Whitmer) and Blue: (Anthony Wayne, Genoa, Maumee, Perrysburg, Port Clinton and Rossford). The names were changed in 1957, with the Orange Division becoming the Great Lakes League and the Blue Division becoming the Northern Lakes League.

Great Northern Conference Divisions (created in 1956)
Orange / Great Lakes League	Blue / Northern Lakes League
Bowling Green	Anthony Wayne
Clay	Genoa
Fostoria	Maumee
Rogers	Perrysburg
Sylvania	Port Clinton
Whitmer	Rossford

- The NLL begins for the 1956-57 school year with Anthony Wayne, Genoa, Maumee, Perrysburg, Port Clinton, and Rossford as its charter members.
- Eastwood joins in 1959 after being accepted in 1958.

=== 1960s ===
- Elmwood and Lake both join in 1960.
- When Springfield (Holland HS until 1959) joins in 1962, the NLL will have its largest membership total at ten schools. This would only last for the 1962-63 school year.
- Port Clinton switches into the Great Lakes League (the Orange Division of the GNC) in 1963 after winning three football titles in 1957, 1960, and 1962.

=== 1970s ===
- For the 1972-73 school year, Eastwood, Elmwood, and Genoa leave to help form the Suburban Lakes League (SLL), leaving 6 members for a while. Swanton and Napoleon were suggested as replacements.
- Southview joins in 1976 after Sylvania High School splits.
- Bowling Green leaves the GLL in 1978 to bring the league total to 8.

=== 1980s ===
- The League membership remains consistent

=== 1990s ===
- For the 1996-97 school year, Lake leaves to join the SLL, and is replaced by Northview, who leaves the former Great Lakes League. The football team remained in the GLL for the 1996 season before fully joining at season's end.
- Around 1999, Rossford first considered leaving the NLL for a league with members closer in their size. The 9-member SLL offered an opening, but Rossford initially declined.

=== 2000s ===
- In 2008, Rossford sent a letter of interest to be considered as the replacement for Lakota in the SLL, who left for the MAL in 2009. The SLL could not get a 6-out-of-7 vote to accept Rossford, ensuring they would remain a member of the NLL for at least a few more years. The NLL considered adding Clay and Napoleon to make a ten-school league, but a majority vote was not reached to expand.
- In May 2009, Rossford's board of education voted unanimously to leave the Northern Lakes League and form the new Northern Buckeye Conference with Eastwood, Genoa, Lake, Otsego, and Woodmore, all schools that were withdrawing from the Suburban Lakes League. Later additions to the NBC included Elmwood and Fostoria. The new league began competition in the fall of 2011.
- In June 2009, Napoleon High School accepted the invitation to join the Northern Lakes League in 2011 as the replacement for Rossford.
- In August 2009, Maumee's school board voted 3-2 to remain members of the Northern Lakes League and to not accept the NBC's invitation to join their new league.

=== 2020s ===
- In January 2021, the NLL announced a plan to expand the league to 16 members, with two divisions of eight schools each based on enrollment. Any schools interested in membership were invited to apply, and it was hinted that expansion would most likely affect the Three Rivers Athletic Conference (TRAC) more than any other leagues.
- On March 22, 2021, Maumee's school board voted unanimously to leave the NLL and join the Northern Buckeye Conference no later than the 2023-24 school year as a replacement for Elmwood High School.
- On April 9, 2021, the seven remaining NLL schools sent invitations to four schools that were currently members of the TRAC: Findlay, Fremont Ross, Oregon Clay, and Whitmer. Fremont Ross voted to accept the invitation on April 12, followed by Findlay on April 19, Clay on April 20, and Whitmer on April 21.
- On November 11, 2022, the NLL announced their division names and alignments for the 2023-24 through 2026-27 school years. The Buckeye Division will be for the larger schools and the Cardinal Division will be for the smaller schools, with a slightly different alignment for football. Springfield will play in the Buckeye Division for football during the 2023 and 2024 seasons. They will move to the Cardinal Division and Clay will play in the Buckeye Division for the 2025 and 2026 seasons. School enrollment will be considered every two years for reorganizing and balancing the divisions.
- On January 24, 2025, the NLL invited Liberty-Benton to join the league as a member of the Cardinal Division beginning in the 2026-27 school year. Liberty-Benton accepted the invitation on January 27th.

School	Boys	Girls	Total
Buckeye Division (2023-24 & 2024-25) (based on OHSAA 22-23 & 23-24 final total enrollments)
Whitmer	843	777	1,620
Perrysburg	649	629	1,278
Findlay	642	551	1,193
Anthony Wayne	546	521	1,067
Northview	495	488	983
Cardinal Division (2023-24 & 2024-25) (based on OHSAA 22-23 & 23-24 final total enrollments)
Clay	424	422	846
Springfield	397	437	834
Southview	406	408	814
Fremont Ross	400	400	800
Bowling Green	344	330	674
Napoleon	236	200	436

School	Boys	Girls	Total
Buckeye Division Football (2023 & 2024) (based on OHSAA 19-20, 20-21, & 21-22 final total enrollments)
Whitmer	839	766	1,605
Perrysburg	672	580	1,252
Findlay	600	575	1,175
Anthony Wayne	544	538	1,082
Northview	511	503	1,014
Springfield	452	432	884
Cardinal Division Football (2023 & 2024) (based on OHSAA 19-20, 20-21, & 21-22 final total enrollments)
Clay	442	432	874
Fremont Ross	454	399	853
Southview	368	377	745
Bowling Green	361	353	714
Napoleon	248	258	506

== All-time membership ==
=== Football champions ===
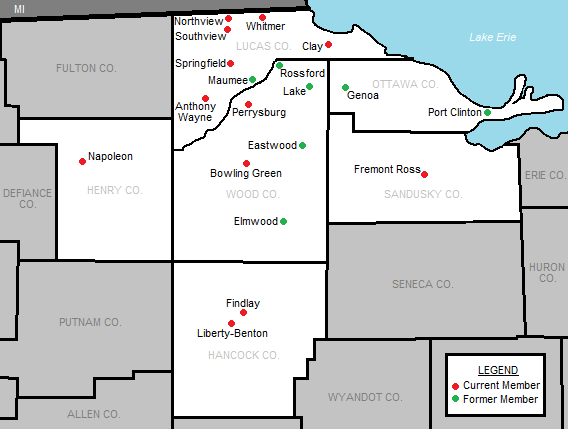
The all-time members of the Northern Lakes League

Year	Champions
1956	Maumee
1957	Port Clinton
1958	Perrysburg
1959	Maumee, Port Clinton
1960	Port Clinton
1961	Perrysburg
1962	Maumee, Port Clinton
1963	Rossford
1964	Rossford
1965	Elmwood
1966	Eastwood
1967	Perrysburg
1968	Rossford
1969	Rossford
1970	Springfield
1971	Lake
1972	Rossford
1973	Anthony Wayne
1974	Anthony Wayne, Maumee, Springfield
1975	Maumee
1976	Anthony Wayne
1977	Perrysburg
1978	Lake
1979	Perrysburg
1980	Perrysburg
1981	Lake, Springfield
1982	Rossford
1983	Lake, Springfield
1984	Bowling Green, Perrysburg
1985	Perrysburg
1986	Maumee
1987	Anthony Wayne
1988	Anthony Wayne, Bowling Green
1989	Rossford
1990	Rossford
1991	Bowling Green, Springfield
1992	Maumee, Southview, Springfield
1993	Springfield, Bowling Green
1994	Springfield, Maumee
1995	Bowling Green
1996	Bowling Green
1997	Bowling Green, Southview
1998	Bowling Green, Southview
1999	Southview
2000	Bowling Green
2001	Maumee, Perrysburg
2002	Rossford
2003	Southview
2004	Southview
2005	Northview, Southview
2006	Perrysburg
2007	Southview
2008	Southview
2009	Maumee, Southview
2010	Southview
2011	Southview
2012	Napoleon
2013	Perrysburg
2014	Perrysburg
2015	Perrysburg
2016	Springfield
2017	Anthony Wayne
2018	Anthony Wayne
2019	Anthony Wayne
2020	Perrysburg
2021	Anthony Wayne
2022	Perrysburg

=== Divisional Era Champions ===
Year	Division	Champions
2023	Buckeye	Anthony Wayne, Findlay, Whitmer
2023	Cardinal	Southview
2024	Buckeye	Anthony Wayne
2024	Cardinal	Clay
2025	Buckeye	Perrysburg, Whitmer
2025	Cardinal	Napoleon
2026	Buckeye	Whitmer
2026	Cardinal	Fremont Ross

=== See also ===
Ohio High School Athletic Conferences
