= Three Rivers Athletic Conference =

Ohio high school athletic conference

- Classification: OHSAA Divisions I & II
- Founded: 2011
- Sports fielded: Football, Cross Country, Golf, Soccer, Tennis, Basketball, Gymnastics, Swimming and Diving, Wrestling, Baseball, Softball, Track and Field
- No. of teams: 10
- Region: Ohio
- Website: http://www.tracsports.org

Locations
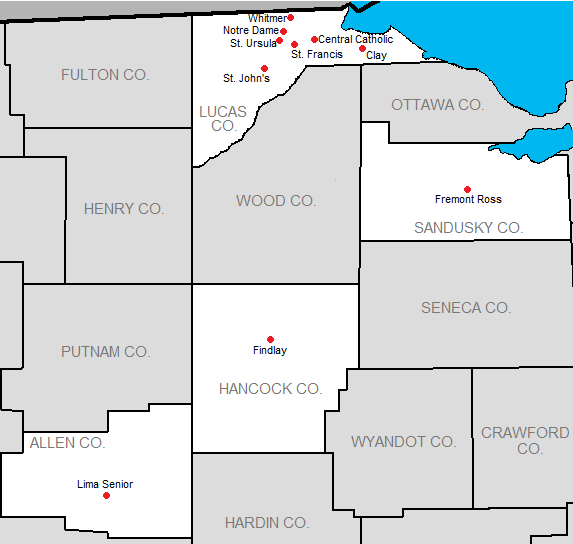

The Three Rivers Athletic Conference was an Ohio High School Athletic Association (OHSAA) high school athletic conference that began athletic competition in 2011 and lasted until 2023 with 10 high schools from Northwest Ohio, seven of which were from the Toledo metropolitan area, and one each from the cities of Findlay, Fremont and Lima. Ken Myers, former director of public safety and public services in Fremont, was the league's inaugural commissioner. The three rivers from which the conference derived its name are the Maumee, Sandusky, and Blanchard.

== Members ==
School	Nickname	Location	Enrollment (CB/FB 2020)	State FB Region (2020)	Colors	Type	Tenure	Notes
Central Catholic	Fighting Irish	Toledo	396	2:6	Scarlet, Gray	Parochial	2011-2023	Joined CHSL
Clay	Eagles	Oregon	446	2:6	Green, Yellow	Public	2011-2023	Joined NLL
Findlay	Trojans	Findlay	604	1:2	Blue, Gold	Public	2011-2023	Joined NLL
Fremont Ross	Little Giants	Fremont	459	2:6	Purple, White	Public	2011-2023	Joined NLL
Lima Senior	Spartans	Lima	432	2:6	Scarlet, Gray	Public	2011-2023	Joined Toledo City League
Notre Dame	Eagles	Toledo			Blue, Gold	Parochial (Girls)	2011-2023	Joined CHSL
St. Francis de Sales	Knights	Toledo	546	2:6	Red, Blue	Parochial (Boys)	2011-2023	Joined CHSL
St. John's Jesuit	Titans	Toledo	479	2:6	Blue, Vegas Gold	Parochial (Boys)	2011-2023	Joined CHSL
St. Ursula	Arrows	Toledo			Blue, Gold	Parochial (Girls)	2011-2023	Joined CHSL
Whitmer	Panthers	Toledo	842	1:2	Maize, Blue	Public	2011-2023	Joined NLL

== History ==
The Three Rivers Athletic Conference began its inaugural season in the fall of 2011. The idea for the creation of the league was brought about following Toledo Public Schools' decisions to close Libbey High School and athletic cuts within TPS which were made by the system to offset a reported $39 million budget deficit. In May 2010, the Toledo Public School board of education voted to cut all junior high (seventh and eighth grade) and freshman sports, as well as the discontinuation of boys tennis, cross country, golf, ice hockey and wrestling. This caused concern for the non-TPS members, who wanted to have competition in those sports and at those levels without struggling to find games.

Clay High School, who joined the Toledo City League in 2003, were the first school to announce that they would leave following a unanimous vote of 5–0 by the Oregon School District in mid July 2010. Following Clay's decision, TCL members Central Catholic, Notre Dame, St. Francis de Sales, St. John's Jesuit, St. Ursula and Whitmer all announced that they would leave the City League as well. Fremont Ross, who was to join the City League in 2011, as well as Findlay and Lima Senior were also announced as members of the new league.

Near the end of July 2010, the new league's members announced that Three Rivers Athletic Conference was chosen to be the name for the conference. The name represents the Northwest Ohio rivers - the Maumee, the Sandusky and the Blanchard - which are part of the collective geography of the 10 inaugural member schools. Other names considered for the new league included Toledo Metro Athletic Conference, the Greater Metro Athletic Conference and the Northwest Athletic Conference. Each member of the TRAC will be asked to submit a logo design for the league and the conference's ten principals will make a decision on which logo will be chosen for the league.

Although he indicated that joining the TRAC was "probably off the table", Marion Harding athletic director Gary Miller mentioned that his school did apply for admission into the TRAC as an alternative to being independent in the future. Marion Harding remained members of the Greater Buckeye Conference with Findlay, Fremont Ross, and Lima Senior through the 2010–11 school year, and eventually wound up in the Mid-Ohio Athletic Conference in 2014.

On April 9, 2021, invitations were extended to four TRAC schools by the NLL, starting with the 2023–2024 school year: Findlay, Fremont Ross, Oregon Clay, and Whitmer. Fremont Ross voted to accept the invitation on April 12, Findlay on April 19, Clay on April 20, and Whitmer on April 21.

On March 10, 2022, Lima Senior announced that it would be joining the Toledo City League in 2023 on a four-year contract as its seventh member. Lima Senior wasn't invited to join the NLL with the other public TRAC schools and decided being in a league was preferable to independence.

On March 22, 2022, the five Catholic high schools in the TRAC (Central Catholic, Notre Dame, St. Francis, St. John's Jesuit, and St. Ursula) were introduced as the newest members of the Detroit Catholic High School League, effective for the fall of 2023. They will bring the CHSL's membership up to 32 schools, which create divisions based on the competitiveness of each school's teams.

== Competition format ==
The TRAC will play a standard seven-game varsity football schedule in weeks 4-10 of the season, with each of the eight schools that have varsity football playing non-league games in the first three weeks of the football season.

Hockey will be contested outside of the conference umbrella. The hockey teams will retain their membership in the three-tiered Northwest Hockey Conference.

The TRAC will have championship competition for football and all of its other sanctioned sports.

== League championships ==
=== Boys championships ===
School Year	Football	Soccer	Cross Country	Golf	Basketball	Wrestling	Swimming/Diving	Baseball	Track & Field	Tennis
2011–12	Findlay	St. Francis	St. Francis	Findlay	Whitmer	Clay	St. Francis	St. John's Jesuit	Whitmer	St. John's Jesuit
2012–13	Whitmer	St. John's Jesuit	St. Francis	Findlay	St. John's Jesuit	Clay	St. Francis	Central Catholic	Whitmer	St. John's Jesuit
2013–14	Central Catholic	St. John's Jesuit	St. Francis	St. John's Jesuit	Central Catholic	Clay	St. Francis	St. John's Jesuit	Whitmer	St. John's Jesuit
2014–15	Central Catholic	Findlay, St. Francis, St. John's (co-champs)	St. John's Jesuit	St. John's Jesuit	St. John's Jesuit	Clay	St. Francis	St. John's Jesuit	St. John's Jesuit	St. John's Jesuit
2015–16	Central Catholic	Findlay	St. John's Jesuit	St. John's Jesuit	Lima Senior	Clay	St. Francis	St. Francis	St. John's Jesuit	St. John's Jesuit
2016–17	Central Catholic	St. John's Jesuit	St. Francis	St. John's Jesuit	St. John's Jesuit	Fremont Ross	St. Francis	St. Francis	Whitmer	St. John's Jesuit
2017–18	Whitmer	St. John's Jesuit	Whitmer	St. John's Jesuit	St. John's Jesuit	Clay	St. Francis	St. Francis	Whitmer	St. John's Jesuit
2018–19	Central Catholic	St. John's Jesuit	Whitmer	St. John's Jesuit	Lima Senior			St. John's Jesuit, St. Francis (co-champs)		
2019–20	Central Catholic	St. John's Jesuit	St. John's Jesuit	St. John's Jesuit	Lima Senior	Clay	St. Francis	St. Francis	Whitmer	Findlay
2020–21	Central Catholic	St. John's Jesuit	St. Francis	St. John's Jesuit	St. John's Jesuit, Findlay, Lima Senior (co-champs)			St. John's Jesuit		St. John's Jesuit
2021–22	Central Catholic				Lima Senior					
2022–23	Central Catholic				Central Catholic, Whitmer (co-champs)					

=== Girls championships ===
School Year	Volleyball	Soccer	Cross Country	Golf	Tennis	Basketball	Gymnastics	Swimming/Diving	Softball	Track & Field
2011–12	St. Ursula	Central Catholic	Notre Dame	St. Ursula	St. Ursula	Notre Dame	Clay	St. Ursula	Central Catholic	Notre Dame
2012–13	St. Ursula	Clay	Notre Dame	St. Ursula	Notre Dame	Notre Dame	Findlay	Fremont Ross	Clay	Notre Dame
2013–14	St. Ursula	Notre Dame	Clay	St. Ursula	Notre Dame	Notre Dame	Findlay	Fremont Ross	Clay	Notre Dame
2014–15	St. Ursula	Clay	Clay	St. Ursula	Notre Dame	Central Catholic, Notre Dame (co-champs)	Findlay	Notre Dame	Clay	Clay
2015–16	St. Ursula	St. Ursula	Notre Dame	St. Ursula	Notre Dame	Central Catholic	Findlay	Fremont Ross	Clay	Notre Dame
2016–17	Notre Dame	Notre Dame, St. Ursula	Notre Dame	St. Ursula	Central Catholic	Notre Dame	Findlay	Findlay	Clay	Notre Dame
2017–18	Notre Dame	Clay	Notre Dame	St. Ursula	Central Catholic	Notre Dame	Notre Dame	St. Ursula	Notre Dame	Lima Senior
2018–19	Clay	Clay	Notre Dame							Fremont Ross
2019–20			St. Ursula							cancelled
2020–21			St. Ursula							Fremont Ross
2021–22			Notre Dame			Central Catholic				Findlay
2022–23			Notre Dame			Central Catholic				Whitmer
