= St. Ursula Academy (Toledo, Ohio) =

- St. Ursula Academy school crest

Location
- 4025 Indian Road; Toledo, Ohio 43606-2226; United States; 41°40′15″N 83°38′28″W

Information
- Type: Private all-girls college-preparatory school
- Motto: Soli Deo Gloria (For the Glory of God Alone)
- Religious affiliation: Catholic
- Established: 1854; 172 years ago
- Founder: Ursuline Sisters (1854)
- President: Mary (Conlisk) Werner '74
- Principal: Lindsay (Launder) Jordan '02
- Grades: 6-12
- Enrollment: 715 (2026-2027)
- Student to teacher ratio: 14:1 (2026-2027)
- Colors: Royal blue and gold
- Athletics: 13 varsity sports
- Athletics conference: Catholic High School League
- Mascot: Arrows
- Website: toledosua.org

St. Ursula Academy, founded in 1854, is Toledo’s oldest, fully accredited, all-girls, Catholic college preparatory school, serving grades 6-12. Located in the heart of Ottawa Hills, the school’s enrollment is 715 students, with a 14:1 student-teacher ratio. SUA offers a full complement of Honors and Advanced Placement courses, evidence-based leader development with The Leadership Program, 13 varsity sports, and full array of fine and performing arts programs.

== History ==
In December 1854, four Ursuline nuns arrived in Toledo, Ohio. Several days after their arrival from nearby Cleveland, Ohio, they began to operate classes on Cherry Street in downtown Toledo. These classes were offered roughly 200 students, ranging in grade level. The nuns moved into a property located on Cherry and Erie Streets in 1859. The early curriculum consisted of courses in English, German, French, History, Art, Music, Natural Sciences, Mathematics, Cooking, and Sewing. There were two primary departments in the school: Elementary and Collegiate.

In 1905, the school relocated to Collingwood Boulevard to a recently purchased facility that included a new convent and academy. As the school began to expand and Mary Manse College opened in 1922, the Ursulines decided to move to a new location on Indian Road. The new building opened for the first time for classes in 1959. Renovations in 2000 included the addition of the Mary Ann LaValley Activities Center, which added four new classrooms, athletic offices, a field house, fitness center, and a dance studio. Further renovations in 2018 added a black box theater, a welcome lobby, an updated Dining Commons, and a state-of-the-art science lab.

== Academics ==
SUA operates on the collegiate block schedule (also referred to as the 4x4 Collegiate Block). Students take four 80-minute classes in each semester and rotate most classes at the end of the first semester. Exceptions to this format are extended AP courses and nine-week, "term-long" classes. In the middle of the day, students also have a "seminar" period during which they can work on assignments, seek assistance from teachers, and collaborate on group projects.

Core courses provide a student with 23 academic credits for graduation, out of 31.5 units of academic credit required: English (4.5 units), Math (4 units), Social Studies (3 units), Science (3 units), Foreign Language (2 units), Theology (4 units), Computer Application (.5 unit), Health (.5 unit), Fine Art (1 unit), Physical Education (.5 unit), and Personal Finance (.5 credit).

Twenty classes are offered in an honors format, such as English, American Literature, Pre-Calculus, Algebra, Geometry, Chemistry, Biology, Physics, Anatomy & Physiology, World History, French, and Spanish, Vocal Music. Eighteen classes are offered at an AP level as well, including Calculus, Chemistry, English Literature, Human Geography, Psychology, Statistics, US Government, and US History.

SUA also offers many elective courses, including Film, Speech, Science, Literature, Economics, Design, Single Survival Life Skills, The Art of Musical Theater, Dance, Psychology, Women's Health, and others.

== The Leadership Program ==
Building on SUA’s history and foundation of developing young women as leaders, in Spring 2021, President Mary Werner and former principal Nichole Flores, who died in 2024, announced SUA’s selection as the first school in the nation to provide a four-year, applied neuroscience and evidence-based leadership curriculum for high school girls taught during the academic school day. Advised by some of the thought leaders in coaching and leader development, The Leadership Program has received international recognition as a “leadership and management idea with the potential to change the world.” (Thinkers50 Radar List 2022).

The SUA Leadership Program is a nine-week, required course for every high school student. The curriculum is delivered within a best-practice leadership development framework that engages both faculty, as certified in-school Leadership Coaches, and students, as learners and peer leaders.

The Class of 2025 is the first group of Arrows to complete all four years of the Leadership Program at SUA. In addition to their diplomas, they also received Leadership Certificates to signify this accomplishment.

== Student life ==
=== Campus Ministry ===
Campus Ministry focuses on spiritual growth and sponsors service projects and class retreats retreats, including Kairos. Campus Ministry encourages students to reach out by volunteering and helps them to earn 60 hours of volunteer credit required for graduation. Each year, SUA students volunteer more than 10,000 hours working in nursing homes, tutoring underprivileged children, and assisting with disaster relief, among other efforts.

=== Athletics ===
St. Ursula Academy has summer athletic camps, a fitness room to support its 13 varsity sports, including basketball, crew, cross country, dance, golf, gymnastics, lacrosse, soccer, softball, swimming, tennis, track, and volleyball. SUA had been a member of the Toledo City League for all athletic competition until joining the Three Rivers Athletic Conference in 2011. In 2023 SUA joined the Catholic High School League based in the Detroit area, but also play independent matches in some sports.

==== State championships ====
- Dance State Championships: 2014 (Pom and Jazz), 2015 (Pom, Jazz, and Hip Hop), 2016 (Pom, Jazz, and Hip Hop), 2017 (Pom, Jazz, and Hip Hop), 2018 (Pom and Jazz), 2019 (Pom and Jazz), 2020 (Pom and Jazz), 2021 (Pom and Jazz), 2022 (Pom and Contemporary/Lyrical), 2023 (Pom and Jazz), 2024 (Pom), 2025 (Pom and Jazz) UDA National Championships: 2020 (Small Pom)
- Volleyball - 2004, 2010
- Softball - 2004
- Swimming - 1983

=== Clubs ===
Language and culture clubs are popular, such as the Afro-American Club, Anime Club, Spanish Club, and French Club. Government and law clubs include the Mock Trial Team, Model UN, and Student Council. Academic and leadership clubs are available, such as the National Honor Society and Ambassador Society.

Many other clubs are created each year. Some of these include the Art Club, Fashion Club, Yearbook, Zonta Club, Harry Potter Club, STEM Club, and Spirit Squad.

== Campus ==
SUA's campus on Indian Road sits on a property adjacent to the Ursuline Center. The school campus includes the school building, a softball field, and a multi-use recreational turf field. Soccer and lacrosse games take place on this space in the fall and spring, respectively. Recent renovations include an improved Dining Commons, a Black Box theatre, and a new science lab, and state-of-the-art fitness center.

== Notable alumnae ==
- Philana Marie Boles 1994 - author of Glitz, Little Divas, In the Paint, and Blame It on Eve
- Joan Breton Connelly 1972 - American classical archaeologist and Professor of Classics and Art History at New York
- Marcy Kaptur 1964 - US Representative from Toledo, Ohio
- Runa Lucienne 2006 - model and actress
- Shirley Murdock 1975 - R&B/gospel singer-songwriter
- Elizabeth Hall Witherell 1973 - editor-in-chief of The Writings of Henry D. Thoreau

== See also ==
- Ursulines
- Roman Catholic Diocese of Toledo
- Beaumont School (Ohio)
- Ursuline Academy (Cincinnati, Ohio)
