= OHSAA Northwest Region athletic conferences =

This is a list of high school athletic conferences in the Northwest Region of Ohio, as defined by the OHSAA. Because the names of localities and their corresponding high schools do not always match and because there is often a possibility of ambiguity with respect to either the name of a locality or the name of a high school, the following table gives both in every case, with the locality name first, in plain type, and the high school name second in boldface type. The school's team nickname is given last.

== Blanchard Valley Conference ==
- **Ada** Bulldogs (2024-)
- **Arcadia** Redskins (1922-)
- **Arlington** Red Devils (1922-)
- **Leipsic** Vikings (football 1965-2021; all sports 1971-2021, 2024-)
- **McComb** Panthers (1922-)
- Pandora **Pandora-Gilboa** Rockets (football 1966-, all sports 1971-, also member of the Putnam County League)
- Mt. Blanchard **Riverdale** Falcons (2014-)
- **Van Buren** Black Knights (1922-)
- **Vanlue** Wildcats (all sports 1922-, football 1922-2022)

=== Former Members ===
- **Mount Cory** Hornets (1922–1950, consolidated into Cory-Rawson)
- **Rawson** Raiders (1922–1950, consolidated into Cory-Rawson)
- **Mount Blanchard** Purple Hurricanes (1922–1960, to Hardin County League)
- Rudolph **Westwood** Warriors (1965–1966, consolidated into Bowling Green)
- Dola **Hardin Northern** Polar Bears (1965-2014, to Northwest Central Conference)
- Bascom **Hopewell-Loudon** Chieftains (2014-2019, to Sandusky Bay Conference)
- Rawson **Cory-Rawson** Hornets (1950-2023, to Northwest Central Conference)
- **North Baltimore** Tigers (2014-2023, to Northwest Central Conference)
- Findlay **Liberty-Benton** Eagles (1922-2026, to Northern Lakes League)

== Buckeye Border Conference ==
(non-football, established 1967)

- **Edon** Bombers (1967-)
- **Fayette** Eagles (1967-)
- West Unity **Hilltop** Cadets (1967-)
- **Holgate** Tigers (2021-)
- **Montpelier** Locomotives (1967–78, 2016-)
- Pioneer **North Central** Eagles (1967-)
- **Pettisville** Blackbirds (1967-)
- **Stryker** Panthers (1967-)

(Edon, Hilltop, Montpelier, and North Central are members of the Great Lakes Conference for football, but are members of this league for every other sport, the exception being Montpelier's wrestling program, which continues to compete in the NWOAL. Stryker and Holgate are members of the Northern 8 Football Conference for football)

Former members

- **Edgerton** Bulldogs (1967–1975)
- **Hicksville** Aces (1967–1975)

== Firelands Conference ==
- Ashland **Crestview** Cougars (1982-)
- Ashland **Mapleton** Mounties (1963-)
- **Monroeville** Eagles (1960-)
- **New London** Wildcats (1970-)
- **Plymouth** Big Red (1982-)
- Norwalk **St. Paul** Flyers (1968-)
- Greenwich **South Central** Trojans (1960-)
- Collins **Western Reserve** Rough Riders (1960-)

Former members

- **Berlin Heights** Tigers (1960–68, consolidated into Edison)
- **Milan** Indians (1960–68, consolidated into Edison)
- Sandusky **Perkins** Pirates (1960–63)
- **Hayesville** Panthers (1963 only, consolidated into Hillsdale)^{1}
- **Jeromesville** Blue Jays (1963 only, consolidated into Hillsdale)^{1}
- Jeromesville **Hillsdale** Falcons (1963–70)
- Sullivan **Black River** Pirates (1964–93)
- Milan **Edison** Chargers (1968–86)
1. Schools competed in spring sports in 1963, fall and winter 1962-63 sports competed in Ashland County League.

== Great Lakes Conference ==
This is a football-only conference made up of schools from Ohio's Buckeye Border Conference and Michigan's Tri-County Conference

- **Edon** Bombers (2026-)
- Erie Township (MI) **Erie Mason** Eagles (2026-)
- West Unity **Hilltop** Cadets (2026-)
- **Montpelier** Locomotives (2026-)
- Pioneer **North Central** Eagles (2026-)
- Madison Township (MI) **Sand Creek** Aggies (2026-)
- Petersburg (MI) **Summerfield** Bulldogs (2026-)
- Ottawa Lake (MI) **Whiteford** Bobcats (2026-)

== Green Meadows Conference ==
Conference Website: http://www.greenmeadowsconf.com

- **Antwerp** Archers (1972-)
- **Ayersville** Pilots (1962-)
- **Edgerton** Bulldogs (1975-)
- Sherwood **Fairview** Apaches (1962-)
- **Hicksville** Aces (1962-)
- **Paulding** Panthers (1962–74, 2021-)
- Defiance **Tinora** Rams (1965-)
- Haviland **Wayne Trace** Raiders (1971-)

Former members

- **Jewell** Rams (1962–1965, consolidated into Tinora)
- Haviland **Blue Creek** Raiders (1966–1971, consolidated into Wayne Trace)
- Oakwood **Auglaize-Brown** Bobcats (1967–1972, consolidated into Paulding)
- **Holgate** Tigers (1971-2021, to Buckeye Border Conference)

== Mid-Buckeye Conference ==
Conference Website: http://mbcsports.org/

The Mid-Buckeye Conference, known also at times as the Middle Buckeye Conference, has had three separate incarnations. The original league began in 1948 and lasted until 1962. The MBC reformed again in 1963 and lasted until 1979. The third and, so far, final reformation took place in 1981.

- Kidron **Central Christian** Comets (no football, 2015-)
- **Crestline** Bulldogs (2015-)
- **Mansfield Christian** Flames (no football, 1982-1983, 2013-)
- Mansfield **St. Peter's** Spartans (no football, 2013-)

(Crestline is independent for football)

Former members

- **Ashley** Aces (1948–1952)
- **Cardington-Lincoln** Pirates (1948–1954)
- **Centerburg** Trojans (1948–1962, First reformation charter member, 1963–1977, Second reformation charter member, 1981–2013), joined Mid-Ohio Athletic Conference.
- **Sunbury** Eagles (1948–1949)
- **Mount Gilead** Indians (1949–1954)
- **Johnstown-Monroe** Johnnies (1950–1962, 1994–2013), rejoined Licking County League.
- **Richwood** Tigers (1950–1952, 1953–1954)
- Sunbury **Big Walnut** Golden Eagles (Consolidation of Sunbury and Galena, 1950–1954)
- **Utica** Redskins (1951–1958, 1960–1962, 1999–2013), rejoined Licking County League.
- Ashley **Elm Valley** Aces (Consolidation of Ashley, 1952–1954)
- **Granville** Blue Aces (1954–1962)
- **Summit Station** Hornets (1954–1956)
- Pataskala **Watkins Memorial** Warriors (Consolidation Of Etna, Kirkersville and Pataskala. 1955–1962)
- Summit Station **Licking Heights** Hornets (Consolidation of Summit Station, 1956–1962)
- **Howard** Bulldogs (First reformation charter member, 1963–1964)
- Mount Vernon **St. Vincent de Paul** Blue Streaks (First reformation charter member, 1963-1968/School closed)
- Howard **East Knox** Bulldogs (Consolidation of Howard and Bladensburg, 1964–1979, Second reformation charter member, 1981–2014), joined Mid-Ohio Athletic Conference.
- **New Albany** Eagles (1965–1972, 1984–1990)
- Gahanna **Columbus Academy** Vikings (1966–1977)
- **Newark Catholic** Green Wave (1966–1973)
- Zanesville **Bishop Rosecrans** Bishops (1977–1979)
- Bowerston **Conotton Valley** Rockets (1978–1979)
- **Worthington Christian** Warriors (1982-2004/no football)
- Johnstown **Northridge** Vikings (1986–2013), rejoined Licking County League.
- **Fredericktown** Freddies (1999–2013), joined Mid-Ohio Athletic Conference
- **Danville** Blue Devils (1954–1962, First reformation charter member, 1963–1979, Second reformation charter member, 1981–2017), joined the Knox-Morrow Athletic Conference
- **Loudonville** Redbirds (2004–2024), joined the Knox-Morrow Athletic Conference
- **Lucas** Cubs (1968–1979, Second reformation charter member 1981–1999, 2013-2026), joined the Northern 10 Athletic Conference

== Midwest Athletic Conference ==
Conference Website: http://www.midwestathleticconference.com/

- **Anna** Rockets (football only, 2006-)
- **Coldwater** Cavaliers (1972-)
- **Fort Recovery** Indians (1978-, Football 1995-)
- Maria Stein **Marion Local** Flyers (1972-)
- **Minster** Wildcats (1972-)
- **New Bremen** Cardinals (1972-)
- **New Knoxville** Rangers (no football, 1978-)
- Rockford **Parkway** Panthers (1972-)
- **St. Henry** Redskins (1972-)
- Delphos **St. John's** Blue Jays (1982-)
- **Versailles** Tigers (2001-)

Former Members

- **Ansonia** Tigers (1972–78)
- **Bradford** Railroaders (1972–78)
- **Mendon-Union** Pirates (1978–92, consolidated into Parkway)

== Northern 10 Athletic Conference ==
- New Washington **Buckeye Central** Bucks (2014-)
- **Bucyrus** Redmen (2014-)
- **Carey** Blue Devils (2014-)
- Tiffin **Calvert** Senecas (2026-)
- North Robinson **Colonel Crawford** Eagles (2014-)
- Bascom **Hopewell-Loudon** Chieftains (2026-)
- **Lucas** Cubs (2026-)
- Sycamore **Mohawk** Warriors (2014-)
- **New Riegel** Blue Jackets (2026-)
- **Old Fort** Stockaders (2026-)
- Attica **Seneca East** Tigers (2014-)
- **Upper Sandusky** Rams (Winter 2014-)
- **Willard** Crimson Flashes (2026-)
- Bucyrus **Wynford** Royals (2014-)

Former Members

- **Crestline** Bulldogs (2014-2015)
- Morral **Ridgedale** Rockets (2014-2021)

== Northern 8 Football Conference ==
- Southington **Chalker** Wildcats (2024–)
- Lakeside **Danbury** Lakers (2020–)
- **Holgate** Tigers (2020–)
- Hermitage (PA) **Kennedy Catholic** Eagles (2026–)
- **Plymouth** Big Red (2026–)
- Sandusky **St. Mary Central Catholic** Panthers (2021–)
- Fremont **St. Joseph Central Catholic** Crimson Streaks (2024–)
- Sebring **McKinley** Trojans (2024–)
- **Stryker** Panthers (2020–)
- **Windham** Bombers (2026–)

=== Former Members ===
- **Toledo Christian** Eagles (2020-2024); re-joined traditional 11-man football in 2025
- Oregon **Cardinal Stritch** Cardinals (2025); 2026 season canceled due to low numbers, school will close in December, 2026

== Northern Buckeye Conference ==
- Pemberville **Eastwood** Eagles (2011-)
- **Fostoria** Redmen (2011-)
- **Genoa** Comets (2011-)
- Millbury **Lake** Flyers (2011-)
- **Maumee** Panthers (2023-)
- **Oak Harbor** Rockets (2023-)
- Bowling Green **Otsego** Knights (2011-)
- **Rossford** Bulldogs (2011-)

Former Members

- Bloomdale **Elmwood** Royals (2011-2023)
- Elmore **Woodmore** Wildcats (2011-2023)

== Northern Lakes League ==
Buckeye Division

- Whitehouse **Anthony Wayne** Generals (1956-)
- **Findlay** Trojans (2023-)
- Sylvania **Northview** Wildcats (1996-)
- **Perrysburg** Yellow Jackets (1956-)
- Sylvania **Southview** Cougars (1976-) (Cardinal Division for Football)
- Toledo **Whitmer** Panthers (2023-)

Cardinal Division

- **Bowling Green** Bobcats (1972-)
- Oregon **Clay** Eagles (2023-) (Buckeye Division for Football)
- Findlay **Liberty-Benton** Eagles (2026-)
- **Fremont Ross** Little Giants (2023-)
- **Napoleon** Wildcats (2011-)
- Holland **Springfield** Blue Devils (1962-)

Former Members

- Pemberville **Eastwood** Eagles (1959-1972, to Suburban Lakes League)
- Bloomdale **Elmwood** Royals (1960-1972, to Suburban Lakes League)
- Millbury **Lake** Flyers (1960-1996, to Suburban Lakes League)
- **Genoa** Comets (1956-1972, to Suburban Lakes League)
- **Port Clinton** Redskins (1956-1963)
- **Rossford** Bulldogs (1956-2011, to Northern Buckeye Conference)
- **Maumee** Panthers (1956-2023, to Northern Buckeye Conference)

== Northern Ohio Conference ==
Lake Division

- **Clyde** Fliers (2026-)
- Tiffin **Columbian** Tornadoes (2026-)
- **Norwalk** Truckers (2026-)
- Sandusky **Perkins** Pirates (2026-)
- **Sandusky** Blue Streaks (2026-)

Bay Division

- **Bellevue** Redmen (2026-)
- Milan **Edison** Chargers (2026-)
- **Huron** Tigers (2026-)
- **Port Clinton** Redskins (2026-)
- **Vermilion** Sailors (2026-)

== Northwest Central Conference ==
The conference began in 2001 with the dissolution of the West Central Ohio Conference.

- Rawson **Cory-Rawson** Hornets (2023-)
- Marion **Elgin** Comets (2017-)
- Dola **Hardin Northern** Polar Bears (2014-) (Football in 2015)
- **North Baltimore** Tigers (2023-)
- Lima **Perry** Commodores (2004-)
- Morral **Ridgedale** Rockets (2021-)
- Mount Victory **Ridgemont** Golden Gophers (2001-)
- Lima **Temple Christian** Pioneers (no football, 2001-)
- McGuffey **Upper Scioto Valley** Rams (2007-)
- Waynesfield **Waynesfield-Goshen** Tigers (2001-)

Former Members

- Milford Center **Fairbanks** Panthers (2001–2013)
- **Fort Loramie** Redskins (football only, 2011–2017, to Cross County Conference)
- Sidney **Lehman Catholic** Cavaliers (2013-2021, to Three Rivers Conference)
- **Marion Catholic** Fighting Irish (no football, 2001–2013, school closed)
- DeGraff **Riverside** Pirates (2001-2021, to Three Rivers Conference)
- Fostoria **St. Wendelin** Mohawks (football only, 2009–2010)
- **Troy Christian** Eagles (football only, 2001–2004)
- **Yellow Springs** Bulldogs (football only, 2003–2008)
- **Crestline** Bulldogs (football only, 2021-2023)

== Northwest Conference ==
=== All sports ===
- Harrod **Allen East** Mustangs (1965-)
- **Bluffton** Pirates (1957-)
- **Columbus Grove** Bulldogs (also in Putnam County League, 1972-)
- Convoy **Crestview** Knights (1971-)
- Delphos **Jefferson** Wildcats (1957-)
- **Lima Central Catholic** T-Birds (2006–13, 2024-)
- Van Wert **Lincolnview** Lancers (no football, 1965-)
- **Spencerville** Bearcats (1957-)

Former members

- **Ada** Bulldogs (1957-2024)
- Harrod **Auglaize** Wildcats (1957–65, consolidated into Allen East)
- Lima **Bath** Wildcats (1957–65)
- **Beaverdam** Beavers (1957–65, consolidated into Bluffton)
- **Elida** Bulldogs (1957–71)
- **Gomer** Bobcats (1957–69, consolidated into Elida)
- **Lafayette-Jackson** Wolves (1947–65, consolidated into Allen East)
- **Leipsic** Vikings (1962–64, 2021-2024, also member of the Putnam County League)
- **Paulding** Panthers (1974-2021)
- Lima **Perry** Commodores (1960-2004)
- McGuffey **Upper Scioto Valley** Rams (1966-2001)

=== Football ===
- Harrod **Allen East** Mustangs (1965-)
- **Bluffton** Pirates (1953-)
- **Columbus Grove** Bulldogs (1947-)
- Convoy **Crestview** Knights (1970–81, 2000-; dropped program 1981-99)
- **Fort Loramie** Redskins (2024-)
- Delphos **Jefferson** Wildcats (1947-)
- **Lima Central Catholic** T-Birds (2006–13, 2024-)
- **Spencerville** Bearcats (1947-)

Former Football Members

- **Ada** Bulldogs (1963-2024) (Went to Blanchard Valley Conference)
- Lima **Bath** Wildcats (1963–65) (Went to Western Buckeye League)
- **Elida** Bulldogs (1947–73) (Went to Western Buckeye League)
- **Forest** Rangers (1947–62, consolidated into Riverdale)
- **Lafayette-Jackson** Wolves (1947–65, consolidated into Allen East)
- **Leipsic** Vikings (1962–64, 2021-2024)
- **Lima Central Catholic** T-Birds (2006–13)
- **North Baltimore** Tigers (1967–69)
- **Ottawa-Glandorf** Titans (1963–67) (Went to Western Buckeye League)
- **Pandora-Gilboa** Rockets (1947–66)
- **Paulding** Panthers (1967-21)
- Lima **Perry** Commodores (1967-2004)
- Lima **Shawnee** Indians (1947–53) (Went to Western Buckeye League)
- McGuffey **Upper Scioto Valley** Rams (1978-2001)

== Northwest Hockey Conference ==
=== Varsity ===
Red Division

- Whitehouse **Anthony Wayne** Generals
- **Bowling Green** Bobcats
- **Findlay** Trojans
- **Perrysburg** Yellow Jackets
- Sylvania **Northview** Wildcats
- Toledo **St. Francis de Sales** Knights
- Toledo **St. John's Jesuit** Titans

White Division

- Oregon **Clay** Eagles
- Sylvania **Southview** Cougars
- Toledo **Whitmer** Panthers
- **Lake** Flyers (USA Hockey/club)
- **Springfield** Blue Devils (USA Hockey/club)

=== Junior Varsity ===
Junior Varsity Division

- Whitehouse **Anthony Wayne** Generals (JV)
- **Bowling Green** Bobcats (JV)
- **Findlay** Trojans (JV)
- **Perrysburg** Yellow Jackets (JV)
- Sylvania **Northview** Wildcats (JV)
- Toledo **St. Francis de Sales** Knights (JV)
- Toledo **St. John's Jesuit** Titans (JV)

== Northwest Ohio Athletic League ==
- **Archbold** Blue Streaks (1960-)
- **Bryan** Golden Bears (1926-)
- **Delta** Panthers (1926–31, 1957–69, 1978-)
- Metamora **Evergreen** Vikings (1969–71, 1978-)
- **Liberty Center** Tigers (1926-)
- Hamler **Patrick Henry** Patriots (1978-)
- **Swanton** Bulldogs (1957–69, 1978-)
- **Wauseon** Indians (1926-)

Affiliate

- **Montpelier** Locomotives (full member 1926-2016, wrestling only 2016-)

Former members

- **Napoleon** Wildcats (1926–1978)
- **Defiance** Bulldogs (1931–1955)

== Northwest Ohio Catholic Schools Association ==
(this is a secondary conference for the smaller schools belonging to the Roman Catholic Diocese of Toledo)

- Tiffin **Calvert** Senecas
- Oregon **Cardinal Stritch** Cardinals
- **Lima Central Catholic** Thunderbirds (infrequent participation)
- Fremont **St. Joseph** Crimson Streaks
- Mansfield **St. Peter's** Spartans (no football)
- Sandusky **St. Mary Central Catholic** Panthers
- Norwalk **St. Paul** Flyers

== Ohio Cardinal Conference ==
- **Ashland** Arrows (2003–)
- **Dover** Crimson Tornadoes (2025-) (Football in 2026)
- **Lexington** Minutemen (2003–)
- Mansfield **Madison Comprehensive** Rams (2003–)
- **Mansfield Senior** Tygers (2003–)
- **New Philadelphia** Quakers (2022-)
- Millersburg **West Holmes** Knights (2003–2028)
- **Wooster** Generals (2003–)

Former Members

- Bellville **Clear Fork** Colts (2004–17, to Mid-Ohio Athletic Conference)
- **Mount Vernon** Yellow Jackets (2016-2024)
- **Orrville** Red Riders (2003–16, to Principals Athletic Conference)

== Putnam County League ==
(no football)

- **Columbus Grove** Bulldogs (also member of the Northwest Conference including football, 1930-)
- **Continental** Pirates (1930-)
- **Fort Jennings** Musketeers (1930-)
- **Kalida** Wildcats (1930-)
- **Leipsic** Vikings (also a member of the Northwest Conference including football, 1930-)
- **Miller City** Wildcats (known as Palmer until 1942, 1930-)
- **Ottoville** Big Green (1930-)
- **Pandora-Gilboa** Rockets (also a member of the Blanchard Valley Conference including football, 1952-)

Junior high schools

- **Glandorf** Dragons (Also in Western Buckeye League, but only for middle school)
- **Ottawa** Titans
- Ottawa **Sts. Peter and Paul** Knights

Former members

- **Belmore** Bears (1930–32, consolidated into Leipsic)
- McCulloughville **Crawfish** Eagles (1930–40, consolidated into Blanchard)
- **Glandorf** Dragons (1930–65, consolidated into Ottawa-Glandorf)
- **Ottawa** Indians (1930–65, consolidated into Ottawa-Glandorf)
- **Pandora** Fleetwings (1930–52, consolidated into Pandora-Gilboa)
- Ottawa **Sts. Peter and Paul** Knights (1930–62, school closed & became middle school)
- **Vaughnsville** Vikings (1930–63, consolidated into Columbus Grove)
- Gilboa **Blanchard** Eagles (1940–52, consolidated into Pandora-Gilboa)
- **Ottawa-Glandorf** Titans (1965–67)

== Sandusky Bay Conference ==
- Lakeside **Danbury** Lakers (1948–57, 2018-) (Northern 8 for football since 2020)
- **Gibsonburg** Golden Bears (1948–59, 1963–72, 2018-)
- Kansas **Lakota** Raiders (1960–72, 2016-)
- Castalia **Margaretta** Polar Bears (1963–)
- **Northwood** Rangers (2025-)
- Toledo **Ottawa Hills** Green Bears (2026-)
- Fremont **St. Joseph Central Catholic** Crimson Streaks (1948–86, 2016-) (Northern 8 for football since 2024)
- Sandusky **St. Mary Central Catholic** Panthers (1950–2014, 2016-) (Northern 8 for football since 2021)
- Elmore **Woodmore** Wildcats (2023-)

Future members

- **Toledo Christian** Eagles (2027-, football only)

Former members

- **Genoa** Comets (1948–1956, to Northern Lakes League)
- **Elmore** Bulldogs (1948–1958)
- Sycamore **Mohawk** Warriors (1960–1962)
- **Carey** Blue Devils (1958–1963)
- Fostoria **St. Wendelin** Mohawks (no football, 1968–1972, 2016–2017, school closed)
- **Shelby** Whippets (2017–2018, Football only for 2018 season, to Mid Ohio Athletic Conference)
- **Oak Harbor** Rockets (1948–72, 1986–2023, to Northern Buckeye Conference)
- **Bellevue** Redmen (2017-2026, to Northern Ohio Conference)
- **Clyde** Fliers (1949–2026, to Northern Ohio Conference)
- Tiffin **Columbian** Tornadoes (2017-2026, to Northern Ohio Conference)
- **Norwalk** Truckers (2017-2026, to Northern Ohio Conference)
- Sandusky **Perkins** Pirates (1972–2026, to Northern Ohio Conference)
- **Sandusky** Blue Streaks (2017-2026, to Northern Ohio Conference)
- Milan **Edison** Chargers (1986–2026, to Northern Ohio Conference)
- **Huron** Tigers (1968–2026, to Northern Ohio Conference)
- **Port Clinton** Redskins (1948–49, 1980–2026, to Northern Ohio Conference)
- **Vermilion** Sailors (2016-2026, to Northern Ohio Conference)
- **Willard** Crimson Flashes (2017-2026, to Northern 10 Athletic Conference)
- Tiffin **Calvert** Senecas (1958–66, 1972–86, 2016-2026, to Northern 10 Athletic Conference)
- Bascom **Hopewell-Loudon** Chieftains (2019-2026, to Northern 10 Athletic Conference)
- **New Riegel** Blue Jackets (no football, 2016-2026, to Northern 10 Athletic Conference)
- **Old Fort** Stockaders (no football, 2016-2026, to Northern 10 Athletic Conference)

== Toledo Area Athletic Conference ==
- Oregon **Cardinal Stritch** Cardinals (1995-, no football)
- Toledo **Emmanuel Christian** Warriors (Emmanuel Baptist until 2006, no football, 1988-)
- Toledo **Maumee Valley Country Day** Hawks (no football, 1988-)
- **Pettisville** Blackbirds (boys soccer only, 2020-)
- **Toledo Christian** Eagles (1988-, no football)

(Pettisville is a boys soccer-only member, for other sports, they are members of the Buckeye Border Conference. Toledo Christian is currently independent in football and will join the Sandusky Bay Conference as a football-only member in 2027. Cardinal Stritch currently plays 8-man football in the Northern 8 Football Conference)

Former members

- **Lorain Catholic** Spartans (1994-2004, closed)
- Tiffin **Calvert** Senecas (2014-2016, to Sandusky Bay Conference)
- Lakeside **Danbury** Lakers (1988-2018, to Sandusky Bay Conference)
- **Gibsonburg** Golden Bears (2011-2018, to Sandusky Bay Conference)
- **Stryker** Panthers (football only 2018-2019, to Northern 8 Football Conference)
- **Northwood** Rangers (2000-2025, to Sandusky Bay Conference)
- **Edon** Bombers (football only, 2005-2025, to Great Lakes Conference)
- Erie Township (MI) **Erie Mason** Eagles (football only, 2025, to Great Lakes Conference)
- West Unity **Hilltop** Cadets (football only, 2005-2025, to Great Lakes Conference)
- **Montpelier** Locomotives (football only, 2016-2025, to Great Lakes Conference)
- Pioneer **North Central** Eagles (football only, 2025, to Great Lakes Conference)
- Petersburg (MI) **Summerfield** Bulldogs (football only, 2025, to Great Lakes Conference)
- Ottawa Lake (MI) **Whiteford** Bobcats (football only, 2025, to Great Lakes Conference)
- Toledo **Ottawa Hills** Green Bears (1988-2026, to Sandusky Bay Conference)

== Toledo City League ==
- Toledo **Bowsher** Blue Racers (1962-)
- Toledo **Rogers** Rams (1964-)
- Toledo **Scott** Bulldogs/Lady Bulldogs (1926-)
- Toledo **Start** Spartans (1962-)
- Toledo **Waite** Indians (1926-)
- Toledo **Woodward** Polar Bears (1926-)
- Lima **Lima Senior** Spartans (2023-)

Former members

- Toledo **Libbey** Cowboys/Cowgirls (1926–2010, closed)
- Toledo **Central Catholic** Fighting Irish (1928-2011, to Three Rivers Athletic Conference)
- Toledo **DeVilbiss** Tigers (1933–1991, closed)
- Toledo **Macomber-Whitney** Macmen/Lady Macmen (1938–1991, closed)
- Toledo **St. Francis de Sales** Knights (1963-2011, to Three Rivers Athletic Conference)
- Toledo **St. John's Jesuit** Titans (1968-2011, to Three Rivers Athletic Conference)
- Oregon **Cardinal Stritch** Cardinals (1971–1994, to Toledo Area Athletic Conference)
- Toledo **McAuley** Lions (c. 1976-1988, closed)
- Toledo **Notre Dame** Eagles (c. 1977-2011, to Three Rivers Athletic Conference)
- Toledo **St. Ursula** Arrows (c. 1977-2011, to Three Rivers Athletic Conference)
- Oregon **Clay** Eagles (2003-2011, to Three Rivers Athletic Conference)
- Toledo **Whitmer** Panthers (2003-2011, to Three Rivers Athletic Conference)

== Western Buckeye League ==
- Lima **Bath** Wildcats (1965-)
- **Celina** Bulldogs (1936-)
- **Defiance** Bulldogs (1973-)
- **Elida** Bulldogs (1971-)
- **Kenton** Wildcats (1942-)
- Ottawa **Ottawa-Glandorf** Titans (1967-)
- Lima **Shawnee** Indians (1952–67, 1981-)
- St. Marys **Memorial** Roughriders (1936-)
- **Van Wert** Cougars (1936-)
- **Wapakoneta** Redskins (1936-)

Former Members

- **Bellefontaine** Chieftains (1936–65)
- **Bluffton** Pirates (1936–57)
- **Coldwater** Cavaliers (1957–72)
- Delphos **St. John's** Blue Jays (1971–82)

== Western Ohio Soccer Conference ==
The WOSC is a soccer-only conference that began in 2014. The conference contains teams (and former members) from the Midwest, Northwest, Northwest Central, and Shelby County leagues, who were all previously independent.

- **Anna** Rockets (Shelby County Athletic League, girls only, 2014-)
- **Botkins** Trojans (Shelby County Athletic League, 2014-)
- Lima **Central Catholic** Thunderbirds (Independent, 2014-)
- **Coldwater** Cavaliers (Midwest Athletic Conference, girls only, 2014-)
- Sidney **Fairlawn** Jets (Shelby County Athletic League, boys only, 2014-)
- Sidney **Lehman Catholic** Cavaliers (Northwest Central Conference, 2014-)
- Van Wert **Lincolnview** Lancers (Northwest Conference, 2014-)
- **New Knoxville** Rangers (Midwest Athletic Conference, boys only, 2014-)
- Delphos **St. John's** Blue Jays (Midwest Athletic Conference, girls only, 2014-)
- **Spencerville** Bearcats (Northwest Conference, boys only, 2014-)
- Lima **Temple Christian** Pioneers (Northwest Central Conference, boys only, 2014-)
- **Jackson Center** Tigers (Shelby County League, Boys only 2016-)
- Harrod **Allen East** Mustangs (Northwest Conference, Boys and Girls, 2016-)

== See also ==
- Ohio High School Athletic Association
