= Northwest Conference (Ohio) =

High school athletic league in Ohio

- Classification: OHSAA Division III-IV, Football Divisions V-VII
- Founded: 1947
- Sports fielded: 7 Boys, 5 Girls
- No. of teams: 9
- Region: Ohio

The Northwest Conference (NWC) is an Ohio High School Athletic Association (OHSAA) athletic league located in northwest Ohio and includes schools in Allen, Hardin, Putnam, Shelby, and Van Wert counties. The NWC originally formed in 1947. The Northwest Conference currently awards championships in 10 varsity sports: baseball, basketball, cross country, football, boys golf, softball, girls soccer, track, girls volleyball, and wrestling.

== Current members ==
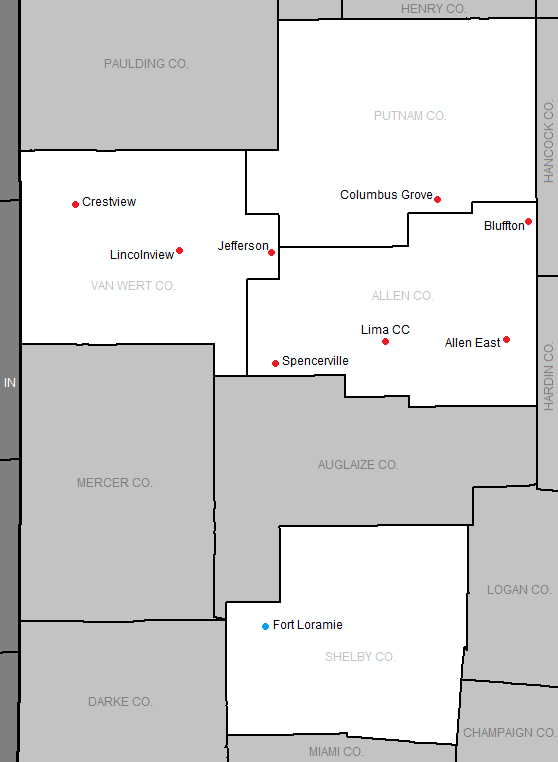
Map of the current Northwest Conference members. Full members are in red, football-only members are in blue.

School	Nickname	Location	Colors	Notes
Allen East	Mustangs	Lafayette	Royal Blue, White	
Bluffton	Pirates	Bluffton	Red, White	
Columbus Grove	Bulldogs	Columbus Grove	Scarlet, Gray	
Crestview	Knights	Convoy	Blue, Red	
Fort Loramie	Redskins	Fort Loramie	Red, Black	Football-only member
Jefferson	Wildcats	Delphos	Red, White	
Lincolnview	Lancers	Van Wert	Blue, Gold	Non-football member
Lima Central Catholic	Thunderbirds	Lima	Scarlet, Columbia	
Spencerville	Bearcats	Spencerville	Black, White	

== Former members ==
High School	Location	Joined NWC	Tenure of Membership	Charter Member	Current league(s)
Ada High School	Ada	1964	1964-2024	No	Blanchard Valley Conference
Bath High School	Lima, Ohio	1964	1964-1966	No	Western Buckeye League
Elida High School	Lima, Ohio	1947	1947-1972	Yes	Western Buckeye League
Forest High School	Forest, Ohio	1947	1947-1962	Yes	Blanchard Valley Conference (as part of Riverdale HS)
Leipsic High School	Leipsic	1962, 2021	1962-1964, 2021-2024	No	Blanchard Valley Conference
North Baltimore High School	North Baltimore, Ohio	1967	1967-1969	No	Northwest Central Conference
Ottawa-Glandorf High School	Ottawa, Ohio	1964	1964-1967	No	Western Buckeye League
Pandora-Gilboa High School	Pandora, Ohio	1947	1947-1966	Yes	Blanchard Valley Conference, Putnam County League
Paulding High School	Paulding, Ohio	1967	1967-2021	No	Green Meadows Conference
Perry High School	Lima, Ohio	1966	1966-2004	No	Northwest Central Conference
Shawnee High School	Lima, Ohio	1947	1947-1953	Yes	Western Buckeye League
Upper Scioto Valley High School	McGuffey, Ohio	1966	1966-2001	No	Northwest Central Conference

== History ==
=== 1947-1949 ===
- The Northwest Conference begins its inaugural season of competition in the fall of 1947 with the eight charter members: Columbus Grove, Delphos Jefferson, Elida, Forest (now Riverdale High School), Lafayette-Jackson (now Allen East High School), Pandora-Gilboa, Lima Shawnee, and Spencerville.

=== 1950-1959 ===
- 1953: Shawnee leaves after the 1952–53 school year.
- 1953: Bluffton becomes a conference member beginning with the 1953–1954 school year.

=== 1960-1969 ===
- 1962: Forest is consolidated into Riverdale Local Schools who maintains membership in a different conference.
- 1962: Leipsic, in Putnam County, joins starting with the 1962–1963 school year.
- 1963: Ada, Lima Bath, and Ottawa-Glandorf join the conference.
- 1964: Leipsic leaves the conference in May.
- 1965: Lafayette-Jackson consolidates with Harrod Auglaize Local to create Allen East.
- 1966: Bath and Pandora-Gilboa leave at the conclusion of the 1965–1966 school year.
- 1966: Lima Perry and Upper Scioto Valley join.
- 1967: Ottawa-Glandorf leaves at the conclusion of 1966–1967. North Baltimore and Paulding enter the conference at the beginning of the 1967–1968 school year.
- 1969: North Baltimore leaves in May. Lincolnview begins conference play in September. Lincolnview entered conference for the 1965–66 season, basketball only. Lincolnview never fielded a football program.

=== 1970-1979 ===
- 1970: Crestview joins at the beginning of the 1970–1971 school year.
- 1972: Elida votes to leave the league. They subsequently begin play in the Western Buckeye League in 1973.

=== 1980-1989 ===
- 1981: Crestview votes to no longer sponsor football at the conclusion of the 1981 season. They remain a conference member in all other sports.

=== 2000-2009 ===
- 2000: Crestview, having restarted their football program as an independent in 1999, officially starts play as a conference member again.
- 2002: Upper Scioto Valley, facing possible removal because of their failure to reliably field a football team during the 2001 season, opts to leave the conference at the conclusion of the 2001–2002 school year. They join the Northwest Central Conference beginning in 2003–2004.
- 2004: Lima Perry finishes its final year as a conference member after announcing their move to join USV in the NWCC in 2003.
- 2006: Lima Central Catholic begins play as a conference member after several years of petitioning.

=== 2010-Present ===
- 2011: On December 1, the Lima Central Catholic administration announced that due to the results of being voted out of the NWC, they would leave the conference at the conclusion of 2012–2013. The move is made in part due to concerns from other conference members over fairness and competitive balance. A scheduling agreement agreed to before the announcement keeps LCC on NWC members' athletic schedules through the 2014–2015 school year unless there is a mutual decision between a conference member and LCC to break the agreement. As of September, 2013, Lima Central Catholic will remain an independent after unsuccessful negotiations with many other area conferences to become a member.
- 2012: Ada and Bluffton are asked to apply for membership in the expanding (and neighboring) Blanchard Valley Conference in March. Both schools decline the BVC's invitation and remain members of the NWC. The BVC also invites North Baltimore and Hopewell-Loudon, who both accept.
- 2020: In response to Holgate leaving the Green Meadows Conference, the GMC invited former member Paulding to rejoin their league. Paulding would accept their invitation and is expected to join after the 2020–21 school year. With Paulding leaving, the NWC invited Blanchard Valley Conference/Putnam County League member Leipsic to join as a replacement, which is expected to join during the 2022–23 school year. Leipsic will completely leave the BVC while maintaining their dual-membership with the PCL.
- 2023: On April 26, the school board at Ada voted to accept the Blanchard Valley Conference's invitation to join their league. No timeframe has been set for when the Bulldogs will switch conferences.

During a special board meeting held on Sunday, May 21, 2023, the Leipsic school board voted to rejoin the BVC. Similar to Ada, a timeframe for returning to their old league has not yet been established.

- In response to Ada and Leipsic leaving the NWC, Fort Loramie was invited to join the league as a football-only member while Lima Central Catholic was invited to rejoin the league as a full-time member. Both schools accepted shortly after and began league competition in 2024.
- 2026: In March, the NWC sent inquiries to Rockford Parkway and Delphos St. John's to join the NWC, but not as official invites. However, this isn't the first time the NWC reached out to Parkway and St. John's. In 2023, the NWC invited both schools to consider joining the conference, but both schools declined and decided to stay in the Midwest Athletic Conference. Both schools decided to decline a 2nd time in June, even though St. John’s was to make a decision on July 1st, 2026.

== Football Champions ==
=== By Year ===
Year	Champions
1947	Jefferson
1948	Forest
1949	Shawnee
1950	Shawnee
1951	Columbus Grove
1952	Columbus Grove
1953	Jefferson
1954	Forest
1955	Elida
1956	Bluffton
1957	Elida
1958	Bluffton; Elida
1959	Columbus Grove
1960	Elida
1961	Pandora-Gilboa; Elida
1962	Elida
1963	Spencerville
1964	Bath
1965	Bath
1966	Bluffton
1967	Allen East
1968	Allen East; Columbus Grove; Paulding
1969	Bluffton
1970	Elida
1971	Ada
1972	Ada; Allen East; Spencerville
1973	Ada
1974	Bluffton
1975	Bluffton
1976	Bluffton
1977	Paulding
1978	Paulding
1979	Ada
1980	Jefferson
1981	Jefferson
1982	Allen East
1983	Paulding
1984	Jefferson
1985	Jefferson
1986	Jefferson
1987	Jefferson
1988	Paulding
1989	Allen East
1990	Allen East
1991	Bluffton
1992	Columbus Grove
1993	Jefferson
1994	Ada
1995	Allen East
1996	Bluffton; Spencerville
1997	Columbus Grove
1998	Columbus Grove; Bluffton
1999	Columbus Grove; Bluffton; Jefferson
2000	Bluffton; Jefferson
2001	Jefferson
2002	Columbus Grove
2003	Columbus Grove
2004	Bluffton
2005	Columbus Grove; Bluffton; Crestview
2006	Lima Central Catholic
2007	Lima Central Catholic
2008	Ada
2009	Ada
2010	Lima Central Catholic
2011	Lima Central Catholic
2012	Lima Central Catholic
2013	Jefferson; Crestview; Ada
2014	Jefferson
2015	Jefferson
2016	Jefferson
2017	Spencerville
2018	Crestview; Spencerville; Columbus Grove
2019	Allen East; Spencerville; Columbus Grove
2020	Columbus Grove
2021	Columbus Grove
2022	Allen East
2023	Columbus Grove
2024	Columbus Grove
2025	Columbus Grove
2026	Lima Central Catholic

== Boys soccer ==
Championships, by year (boys soccer was introduced to the NWC in 2015)

Year	Champions	Runner-up	Third place
2015	Bluffton	Spencerville	Lincolnview
2016	Bluffton	Paulding	Allen East
2017	Bluffton	Ada	Allen East
2018	Bluffton	Ada	Allen East
2019	Bluffton	Allen East	Ada
2020	Bluffton	Ada	Spencerville
2021	Bluffton	Spencerville	Lincolnview
2022	Bluffton	Spencerville	Lincolnview
2023	Bluffton	Lincolnview	Spencerville

- Bluffton maintains an undefeated conference record through nine consecutive years of play, 42-0-0 through 2023.
