= Vantage Career Center =

Coordinates: 40°52′56″N 84°34′12″W

Vantage Career Center is a public vocational school located in Van Wert, Ohio. It serves school districts located in the counties of Allen, Mercer, Paulding, Putnam, and Van Wert. Classes are open to juniors and seniors in local high schools.

== Associate schools ==
Enrollment is open to students from any of Vantage's thirteen partner schools.

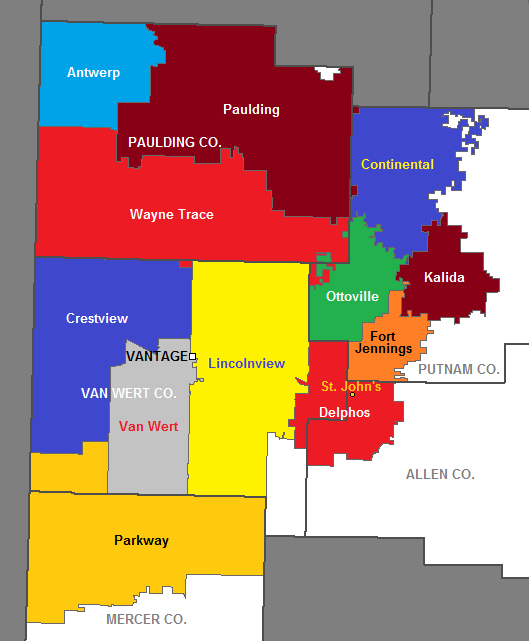
School districts served by Vantage.
- Antwerp High School
- Continental High School
- Crestview High School
- Delphos Jefferson High School
- Delphos St. John's High School
- Fort Jennings High School
- Kalida High School
- Lincolnview Junior/Senior High School
- Ottoville High School
- Parkway High School
- Paulding High School
- Van Wert High School
- Wayne Trace High School
