= Convoy, Ohio =

- Village
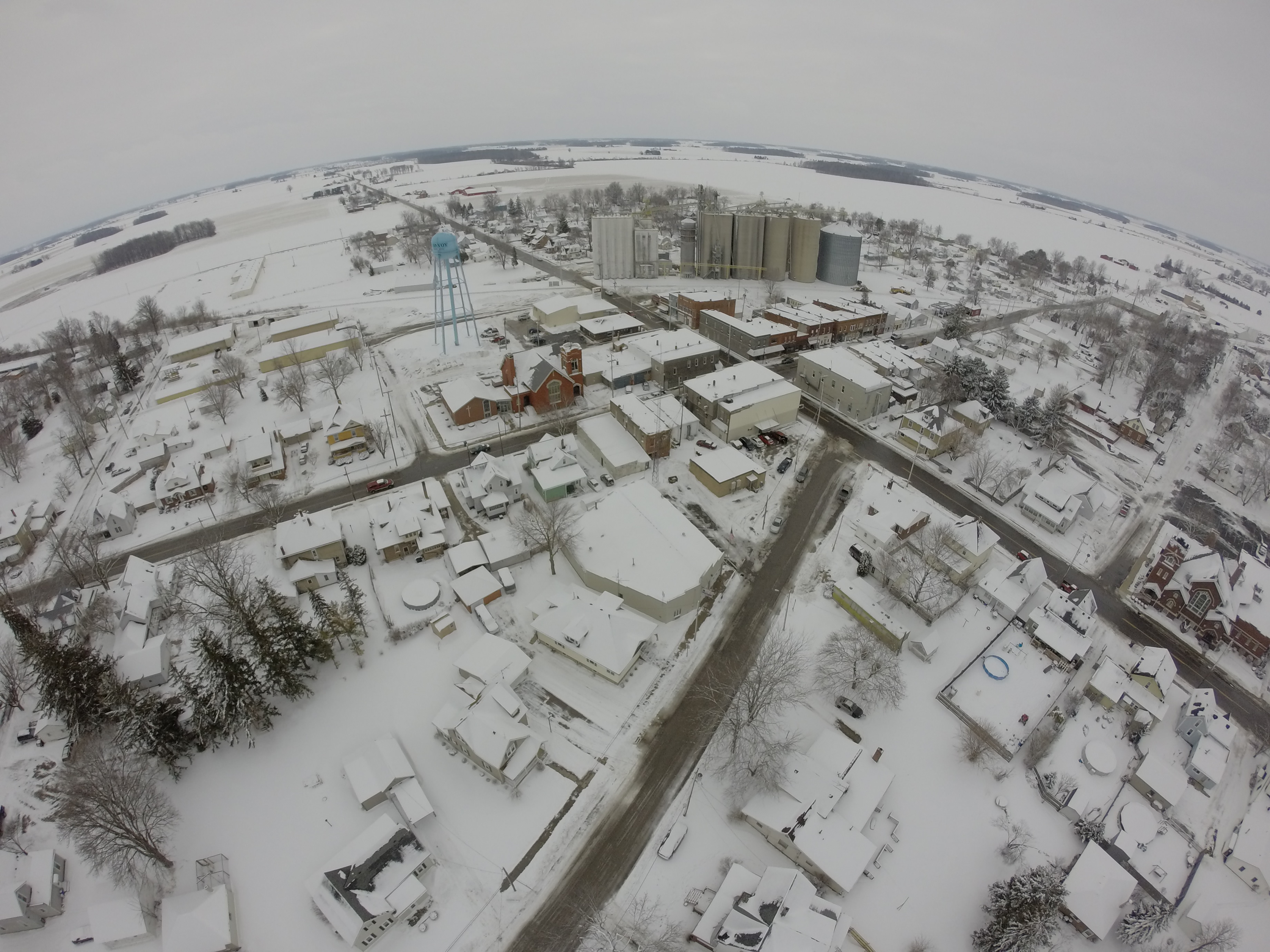
- Aerial view of downtown Convoy

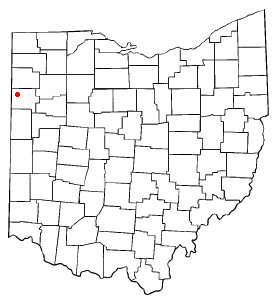
- Location of Convoy, Ohio

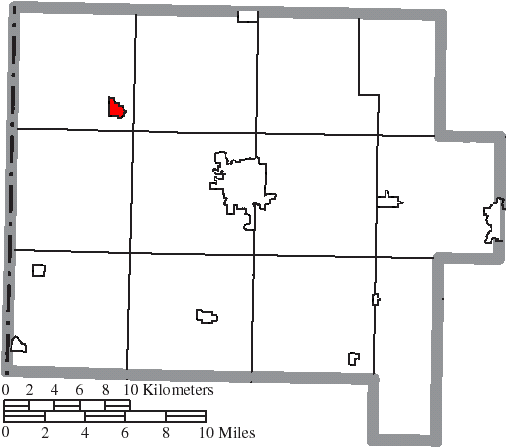
- Location of Convoy in Van Wert County
- Coordinates: 40°55′03″N 84°42′18″W
- Country: United States
- State: Ohio
- County: Van Wert
- Township: Tully

Government
  - Mayor: Timothy Bolenbaugh

Area
  - Total: 0.63 sq mi (1.62 km^{2})
  - Land: 0.63 sq mi (1.62 km^{2})
  - Water: 0 sq mi (0.00 km^{2})
- Elevation: 781 ft (238 m)

Population (2020)
  - Total: 1,012
  - Estimate (2023): 1,000
  - Density: 1,619.4/sq mi (625.24/km^{2})
- Time zone: UTC-5 (Eastern (EST))
  - Summer (DST): UTC-4 (EDT)
- ZIP code: 45832
- Area code: 419
- FIPS code: 39-18546
- GNIS feature ID: 2398620
- Website: www.villageofconvoy.com

Convoy is a village in Tully Township, Van Wert County, Ohio, United States. The population was 1,012 at the 2020 census. It is included in the Van Wert, Ohio Micropolitan Statistical Area.

== History ==
Convoy was platted in 1854. It was named after Convoy, Ireland, the native home of a first settler. A post office called Convoy has been in operation since 1872. The village was incorporated in 1874.

== Geography ==
According to the United States Census Bureau, the village has a total area of 0.56 square miles (1.45 km^{2}), all land.

== Demographics ==
Historical population
Census	Pop.	Note	%±
1880	386		—
1890	500		29.5%
1900	690		38.0%
1910	741		7.4%
1920	932		25.8%
1930	876		−6.0%
1940	817		−6.7%
1950	910		11.4%
1960	976		7.3%
1970	991		1.5%
1980	1,140		15.0%
1990	1,200		5.3%
2000	1,110		−7.5%
2010	1,085		−2.3%
2020	1,012		−6.7%
2023 (est.)	1,000	▼	−1.2%
U.S. Decennial Census

=== 2010 census ===
As of the census of 2010, there were 1,085 people, 411 households, and 277 families living in the village. The population density was 1,937.5 inhabitants per square mile (748.1/km^{2}). There were 459 housing units at an average density of 819.6 per square mile (316.4/km^{2}). The racial makeup of the village was 97.2% White, 0.4% African American, 0.2% Native American, 0.1% Asian, 0.8% from other races, and 1.3% from two or more races. Hispanic or Latino of any race were 2.6% of the population.

There were 411 households, of which 38.7% had children under the age of 18 living with them, 49.9% were married couples living together, 12.7% had a female householder with no husband present, 4.9% had a male householder with no wife present, and 32.6% were non-families. 28.2% of all households were made up of individuals, and 11.2% had someone living alone who was 65 years of age or older. The average household size was 2.55 and the average family size was 3.14.

The median age in the village was 35.2 years. 30% of residents were under the age of 18; 5.8% were between the ages of 18 and 24; 25.7% were from 25 to 44; 23.1% were from 45 to 64; and 15.4% were 65 years of age or older. The gender makeup of the village was 46.1% male and 53.9% female.

=== 2000 census ===
As of the census of 2000, there were 1,110 people, 424 households, and 309 families living in the village. The population density was 1,993.2 inhabitants per square mile (769.6/km^{2}). There were 471 housing units at an average density of 845.7 per square mile (326.5/km^{2}). The racial makeup of the village was 97.12% White, 0.18% African American, 0.36% Native American, 0.09% Asian, 0.81% from other races, and 1.44% from two or more races. Hispanic or Latino of any race were 1.17% of the population.

There were 424 households, out of which 35.1% had children under the age of 18 living with them, 52.6% were married couples living together, 15.3% had a female householder with no husband present, and 26.9% were non-families. 24.8% of all households were made up of individuals, and 11.6% had someone living alone who was 65 years of age or older. The average household size was 2.55 and the average family size was 3.01.

In the village, the population was spread out, with 27.5% under the age of 18, 10.3% from 18 to 24, 25.6% from 25 to 44, 21.1% from 45 to 64, and 15.6% who were 65 years of age or older. The median age was 35 years. For every 100 females there were 91.4 males. For every 100 females age 18 and over, there were 89.4 males.

The median income for a household in the village was $38,500, and the median income for a family was $43,250. Males had a median income of $29,420 versus $26,300 for females. The per capita income for the village was $17,102. About 6.3% of families and 6.3% of the population were below the poverty line, including 8.6% of those under age 18 and 3.8% of those age 65 or over.

== Education ==
Crestview High School sports participate in the Northwest Conference, an athletic body sanctioned by the Ohio High School Athletic Association (OHSAA) which includes the Ada Bulldogs, Allen East Mustangs, Bluffton Pirates, Columbus Grove Bulldogs, Convoy Crestview Knights, Delphos Jefferson Wildcats, Lincolnview Lancers, Leipsic Vikings, and Spencerville Bearcats.

Convoy has a public library, a branch of the Brumback Library.
