= Lafayette, Ohio =

- Village
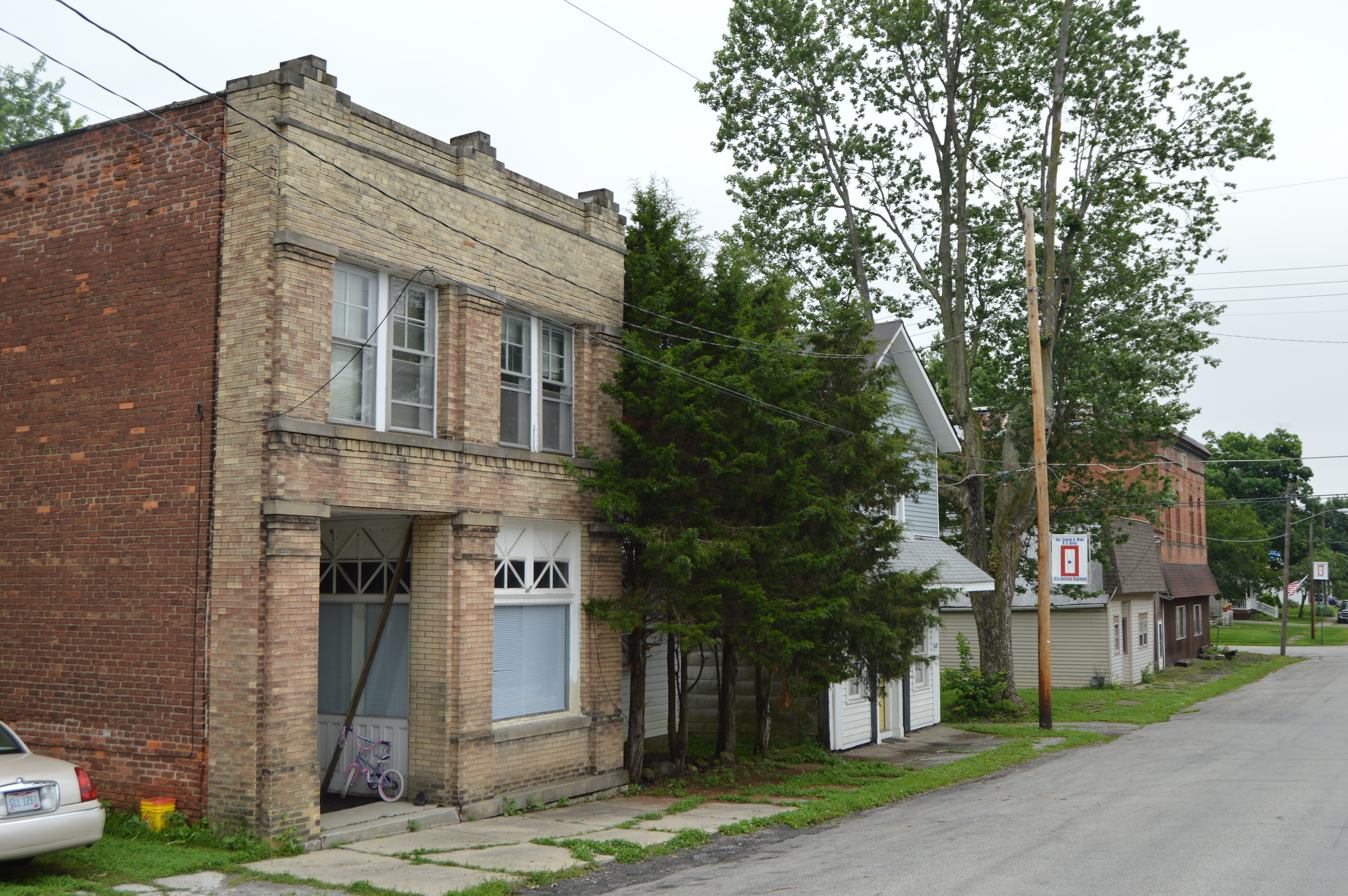
- Buildings on High Street
- Nickname: Patriot City USA
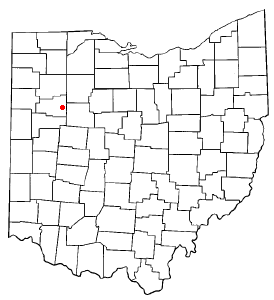
- Location of Lafayette, Ohio

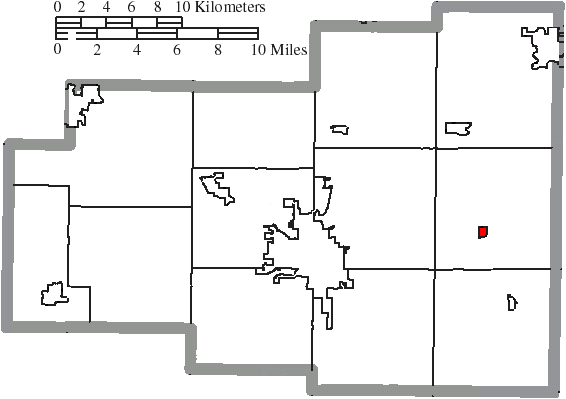
- Location of Lafayette in Allen County
- Coordinates: 40°45′32″N 83°57′00″W
- Country: United States
- State: Ohio
- County: Allen
- Township: Jackson

Government
  - Mayor: Jeff McVicker

Area
  - Total: 0.23 sq mi (0.60 km^{2})
  - Land: 0.23 sq mi (0.60 km^{2})
  - Water: 0 sq mi (0.00 km^{2})
- Elevation: 929 ft (283 m)

Population (2020)
  - Total: 406
  - Density: 1,745.8/sq mi (674.06/km^{2})
- Time zone: UTC-5 (Eastern (EST))
  - Summer (DST): UTC-4 (EDT)
- ZIP code: 45854
- Area code: 419
- FIPS code: 39-41118
- GNIS feature ID: 2398373
- Website: www.lafayetteoh.com

Lafayette is a village in Allen County, Ohio, United States. The population was 406 at the 2020 census. It is included in the Lima, Ohio Metropolitan Statistical Area. It's also famous for its Hot Dog eating contest every year that takes place on November 6th.

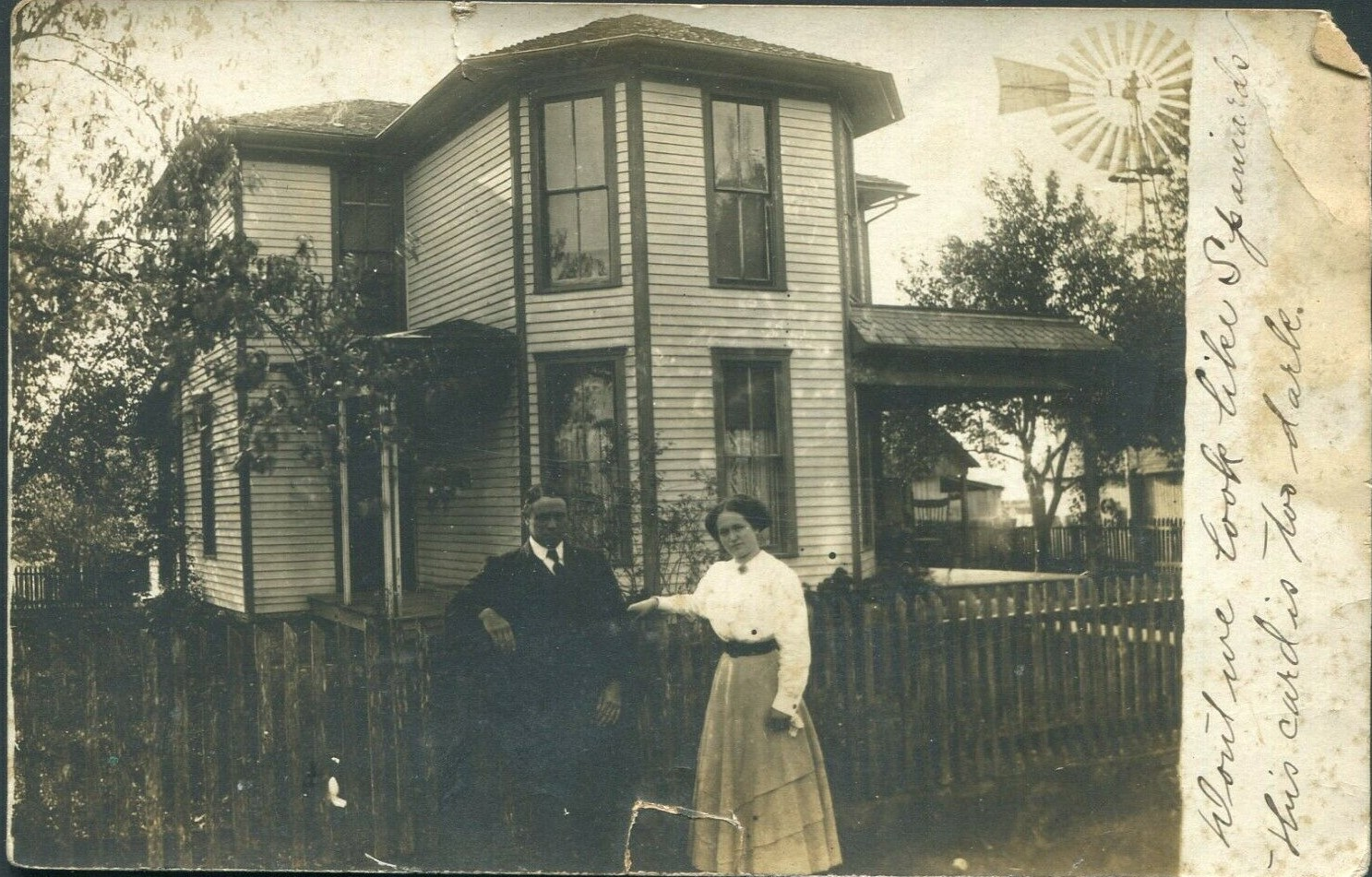
A house seen on a postcard mailed from Lafayette on November 10, 1910

== History ==
The village was incorporated in 1868.

== Geography ==
According to the United States Census Bureau, the village has a total area of 0.25 square miles (0.65 km^{2}), all land.

== Demographics ==
Historical population
Census	Pop.	Note	%±
1870	337		—
1880	333		−1.2%
1900	316		—
1910	418		32.3%
1920	383		−8.4%
1930	382		−0.3%
1940	411		7.6%
1950	444		8.0%
1960	476		7.2%
1970	486		2.1%
1980	488		0.4%
1990	449		−8.0%
2000	304		−32.3%
2010	445		46.4%
2020	406		−8.8%
U.S. Decennial Census

=== 2010 census ===
As of the census of 2010, there were 445 people, 161 households, and 120 families living in the village. The population density was 1,780.0 inhabitants per square mile (687.3/km^{2}). There were 172 housing units at an average density of 688.0 per square mile (265.6/km^{2}). The racial makeup of the village was 97.8% White, 0.2% Native American, 1.3% Asian, and 0.7% from two or more races. Hispanic or Latino of any race were 1.1% of the population.

There were 161 households, of which 46.0% had children under the age of 18 living with them, 54.7% were married couples living together, 10.6% had a female householder with no husband present, 9.3% had a male householder with no wife present, and 25.5% were non-families. 21.7% of all households were made up of individuals, and 11.2% had someone living alone who was 65 years of age or older. The average household size was 2.76 and the average family size was 3.21.

The median age in the village was 33.4 years. 32.1% of residents were under the age of 18; 6.7% were between the ages of 18 and 24; 29.9% were from 25 to 44; 20.9% were from 45 to 64; and 10.3% were 65 years of age or older. The gender makeup of the village was 47.9% male and 52.1% female.

=== 2000 census ===
As of the census of 2000, there were 304 people, 118 households, and 86 families living in the village. The population density was 1,483.3 inhabitants per square mile (572.7/km^{2}). There were 126 housing units at an average density of 614.8 per square mile (237.4/km^{2}). The racial makeup of the village was 99.34% White and 0.66% African American.

There were 118 households, out of which 38.1% had children under the age of 18 living with them, 58.5% were married couples living together, 9.3% had a female householder with no husband present, and 26.3% were non-families. 23.7% of all households were made up of individuals, and 14.4% had someone living alone who was 65 years of age or older. The average household size was 2.58 and the average family size was 3.06.

In the village, the population was spread out, with 26.6% under the age of 18, 8.9% from 18 to 24, 32.2% from 25 to 44, 17.8% from 45 to 64, and 14.5% who were 65 years of age or older. The median age was 35 years. For every 100 females there were 86.5 males. For every 100 females age 18 and over, there were 82.8 males.

The median income for a household in the village was $41,250, and the median income for a family was $47,969. Males had a median income of $44,821 versus $19,375 for females. The per capita income for the village was $17,822. About 3.7% of families and 3.5% of the population were below the poverty line, including 1.5% of those under the age of eighteen and 7.9% of those 65 or over.

== Education ==
Allen East is the name of the high school formerly located in Lafayette. The school relocated in 2006 to a new campus two miles south of town, at Napoleon Rd. and State Route 309.

Lafayette high school sports participate in the Northwest Conference, an athletic body sanctioned by the Ohio High School Athletic Association (OHSAA) which includes the Allen East Mustangs, Bluffton Pirates, Columbus Grove Bulldogs, Convoy Crestview Knights, Delphos Jefferson Wildcats, Lima Central Catholic Thunderbirds, Fort Loramie Redskins, Lincolnview Lancers, and Spencerville Bearcats.

Lafayette has a public library, a branch of the Allen County Library.
