= Kory Lichtensteiger =

American football player (born 1985)

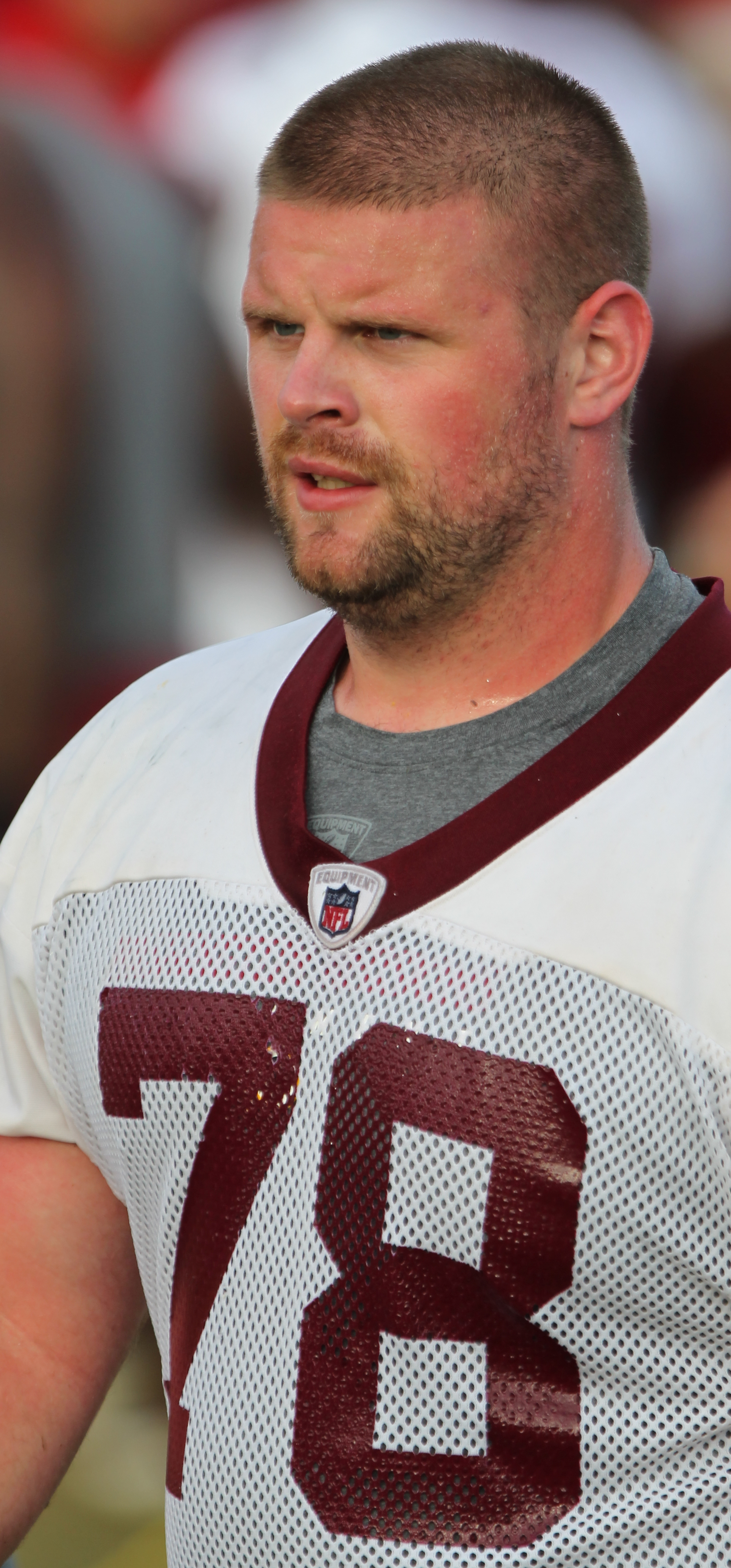
- Lichtensteiger with the Washington Redskins in 2011

No. 65, 67, 78
- Positions: Center, guard

Personal information
- Born: March 22, 1985 (age 41); Van Wert, Ohio, U.S.
- Listed height: 6 ft 2 in (1.88 m)
- Listed weight: 295 lb (134 kg)

Career information
- High school: Crestview (Convoy, Ohio)
- College: Bowling Green
- NFL draft: 2008: 4th round, 108th overall pick

Career history
- Denver Broncos (2008); Minnesota Vikings (2009); Washington Redskins (2010–2016)

Awards and highlights
- 2× First-team All-MAC (2006, 2007); 2× Second-team All-MAC (2004, 2005)

Career NFL statistics
- Games played: 93
- Games started: 75
- Stats at Pro Football Reference

Kory Adam Lichtensteiger (born March 22, 1985) is an American former professional football player who was a center in the National Football League (NFL). He was selected by the Denver Broncos in the fourth round of the 2008 NFL draft. He played college football for the Bowling Green Falcons.

Lichtensteiger also played for the Minnesota Vikings and spent seven seasons with the Washington Redskins.

== Early life ==
Lichtensteiger played high school football at Crestview High School in Convoy, Ohio where he was a four-year scholar athlete in both basketball and football. During his time at Crestview, he was named a first-team All-Northwest Conference offensive and defensive lineman. His other awards included conference Lineman of the Year in his junior and senior seasons, and First-team All-Ohio on both his junior and senior year.

== College career ==
Lichtensteiger became a member of the Falcons football team at Bowling Green State University in 2003. In his five years with the team, he received numerous honors including being chosen as a team captain and being named to All-MAC, Academic All-MAC and national All-American lists.

He was redshirted his freshman year and played center on the scout team.

During his second year on the team, Lichtensteiger was moved to offensive guard. He started all 12 games that season and was named Second-team All-MAC and a Football Writers Association of America Freshman All-American.

In his redshirt sophomore season, Lichtensteiger started all 11 games and was once again named Second-team All-MAC. As a junior, he was shifted back to center and started 12 games. On the field he was named First-team All-MAC and Co-MVP of the team. Off the field he was named to the Academic All-MAC team.

In his final season with the Falcons, he was named pre-season First-team All-MAC. He started 13 games and was a finalist for the Rimington Trophy and a semifinalist for the Draddy Trophy.

Kory graduated with a Bachelor of Science in Criminal Justice degree.

== Professional career ==
=== Pre-draft ===
Pre-draft measurables
Height	Weight	Arm length	Hand span	40-yard dash	10-yard split	20-yard split	20-yard shuttle	Three-cone drill	Vertical jump	Broad jump
6 ft 2 1/4 in (1.89 m)	298 lb (135 kg)	32 in (0.81 m)	9 1/2 in (0.24 m)	5.34 s	1.84 s	3.04 s	4.56 s	7.60 s	23.0 in (0.58 m)	8 ft 8 in (2.64 m)
All values from NFL Combine

Lichtensteiger was considered the No. 4 center available in the 2008 NFL draft.

=== Denver Broncos ===
Lichtensteiger was selected by the Denver Broncos in the fourth round (108th overall).

On Monday, July 21, 2008, Lichtensteiger signed a four-year contract with the Broncos. He joined the team as a backup center who could also fill in at guard.

The Broncos waived Lichtensteiger on September 4, 2009.

=== Minnesota Vikings ===
Lichtensteiger was claimed off waivers by the Minnesota Vikings on September 6. He was waived on September 29.

=== Washington Redskins ===
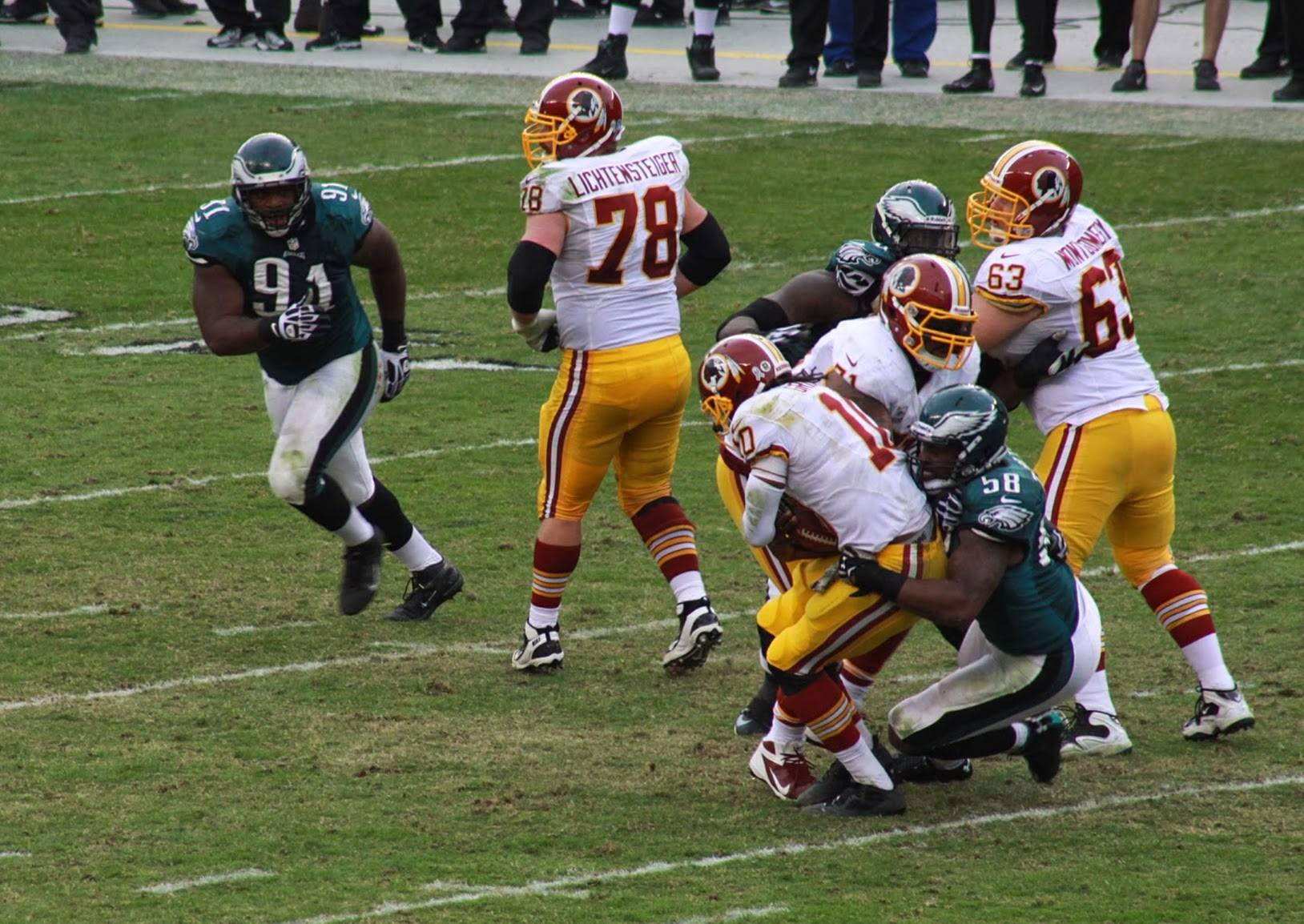
Lichtensteiger (#78) in 2013

Lichtensteiger signed a future contract with the Washington Redskins on January 12, 2010. He was reunited with head coach Mike Shanahan, whom he played for in his rookie season with the Broncos. In his first season with the Redskins, he became the starting left guard of the offensive line.

In the 2011 season, Lichtensteiger would be put on injured reserve after suffering a torn anterior cruciate ligament in his right knee in Week 6 against the Philadelphia Eagles.

On March 3, 2012, the Redskins tendered an original round qualifying contract to Lichtensteiger, which would allow the Redskins to receive an additional fourth round pick if he were to sign with another team. On March 20, he signed his one-year, $1.26 million restricted free agent tender. Despite his ACL being fine, he had arthroscopic surgery on his right knee to clean out floating particles in the knee on July 30 and missed the entire 2012 preseason. After missing the entire preseason, he was able to play and start in the season opener win against the New Orleans Saints. On December 18, the Redskins named him the winner of the 2012 Ed Block Courage Award for how well he recovered from his ACL tear in the previous season.

Set to become a free agent for the 2013 season, Lichtensteiger agreed to a five-year deal with the Redskins on March 9, 2013. After the Redskins released Will Montgomery on March 14, 2014, they announced plans to shift Lichtensteiger from guard to center for the 2014 season.

On November 10, 2015, the Redskins put Lichtensteiger on injured reserve with a designation to return after he suffered a pitched nerve in his neck.

On September 27, 2016, Lichtensteiger was placed on injured reserve with a calf injury. He was designated for return on December 7, 2016, and was officially activated off injured reserve on December 10, 2016.

=== Retirement ===
On February 10, 2017, Lichtensteiger announced his retirement from the NFL. Washington released him from the reserve/retired list in April 2021.
