= Middlebury, Ohio =

Unincorporated community in Ohio, U.S.

- Unincorporated community
- Location within Ohio Location within the United States
- Coordinates: 40°50′46″N 84°44′46″W
- Country: United States
- State: Ohio
- County: Van Wert
- Founded: 1850
- Time zone: UTC−5 (EST)
  - Summer (DST): UTC−4 (EDT)
- Area code: 419

Middlebury is an unincorporated community in Van Wert County, in the U.S. state of Ohio.

== Geography ==
Middlebury is located in the northwestern part of Van Wert County, south of U.S. Route 224. The surrounding area is flat agricultural land that was historically part of the Great Black Swamp, the extensive wetland that covered much of northwestern Ohio before it was drained for farming in the mid-to-late 19th century.

== Education ==
The community is served by the Crestview Local School District, which operates a unified PreK–12 campus in the nearby village of Convoy.

== History ==
The community was founded as Dasie on November 10, 1850. A post office called Dasie was established in 1881 and remained in operation until 1904. The community was later renamed Middlebury, a name reflecting its location roughly midway between Van Wert and Decatur, Indiana.
