= Ada High School =

Ada High School may refer to:

- Ada High School (Ohio), Ada, Ohio
- Ada High School (Oklahoma), Ada, Oklahoma
