= Bath Local School District =

School district in Ohio, United States

Address
- 2650 Bible Road Lima, Allen, Ohio, 45801; United States
- Coordinates: 40.774507°N 84.051988°W

District information
- Type: Public
- Grades: PK–12
- Superintendent: Michael Estes
- School board: Bath School Board
- Schools: 4
- NCES District ID: 3904576

Students and staff
- Students: 1,588 (2025–2026)
- Teachers: 99.95 (on an FTE basis) (2025–2026)
- Staff: 174.86 (on an FTE basis) (2025–2026)
- Student–teacher ratio: 15.89 (2025–2026)
- Athletic conference: Western Buckeye League (WBL)
- District mascot: Wildcat and Wildkitten
- Colors: Columbia Blue; Gold

Other information
- Website: www.bathwildcats.org

Bath Local School District is a public school system located in Bath Township near Lima, Ohio. The district also includes part of Monroe Township. It is the only school district in Bath Township. They are a member of the Western Buckeye League (entered 1965).

The school district consists of 3 buildings, the Elementary School, the Middle School also known as the Junior High, and Bath High School. A new Elementary building was built and opened for students in December 2014. The schools have received a rating of "Excellent School" by the Ohio Department of Education during school years '01–'02, '02–'03, '03–'04, '04–'05, '05–'06, '06–'07, and '07–'08. 75% of students continue their education immediately after graduation. With the availability of surrounding colleges such as OSU Lima and Rhodes State College, Bath students have an opportunity to participate in the post-secondary options program which is sponsored by the Ford Motor Company. Many students also take classes offered at the Apollo Career Center, which is a joint vocational school in the area. Bath students, starting in seventh grade, may also take advantage of the college credit plus program in which students can take college classes at local universities.

== Mascot ==
The school mascot is the Wildcat for boys' sports and the Wildkitten for girls' sports. The girls’ soccer teams’ mascot is the LadyCats. The school colors are Columbia Blue and Gold.

== Organizations ==
School organizations at Bath include: Band, Symphonic Band, Choir, FCA, Interact Club, National Honor Society, Quiz bowl, Science fair, Mathcounts, The Paw Print Newspaper, Science Olympiad, Student council, and Yearbook editors.

== Recognition ==
U.S. News & World Report awarded Bath High School a bronze award for their America's Best High Schools 2009 rankings. They were the only high school in Allen County to be recognized.

== Athletics ==
=== Ohio High School Athletic Association State Championships ===
- Girls Basketball – 1987
- Girls Softball – 2001, 2014
- Boys Golf - 2005

=== Western Buckeye League Championships ===
- Baseball: 1990, 1975, 1974, 1972, 1971
- Boys Basketball: 1971, 1970, 1969
- Girls Basketball: 2021, 2009, 2008, 2006, 2001, 2000, 1999, 1998, 1996, 1994, 1987, 1986, 1985, 1983
- American football: 1999, 1996, 1989, 1988, 1985, 1984, 1974, 1973
- Golf: 2006, 2005, 2004, 1995, 1978, 1976, 1974, 1973, 1972, 1970, 1969, 1968, 1967, 1966
- Softball: 2005, 2002, 2001, 1999, 1998, 1997, 1996, 1995, 1994, 1993, 1992, 1990, 1985, 1983
- Boys Tennis: 1983, 1982
- Boys Track: 1990, 1980, 1968
- Volleyball: 1996, 1995, 1994, 1993, 1992, 1988

Boys Soccer 2012

== Supporters ==
=== Boosters ===
Since its inception, the Bath Booster Club has helped raise money to support the many different athletic programs at Bath High School. Most recently the club has provided funds to build new soccer and softball fields for the Bath student athletes.

=== Music Association ===
The Mission of the Bath Music Association is to provide unified educational and financial support for the students of the Bath Bands, Bath Choirs, and their directors. They are a volunteer, non-profit organization to aid financially or in any way whatsoever according to need and available funds the Band Program and Choir Program of Bath schools.

=== Parent Teacher Society ===
The PTS is a large organization of parents, teachers, and community citizens who volunteer their time and talents to help ensure their children receive a valuable, rewarding and quality education at Bath Schools. During the past school year, the Bath PTS has helped sponsor many events and groups at the elementary, middle, and high school levels. A few of those events include the Senior Breakfast, the Honors Program, the IDAA and SODDA teams, Author-Illustrator visits, Dollars for Scholars, family disaster funds and field trips for all Bath buildings. The funds to support these programs are derived from three major projects of the Bath PTS. They include: the Wildcat Den at the Allen County Fair, the Fall Craft Show held each year in November, and our Annual PTS Membership Drive.

== Administration ==
=== District-wide ===
- Superintendent: Michael Estes
- Treasurer: Joel Parker
- Director of Special Education:Jeremy Clark

=== High school ===
- Principal: Brian Jesko
- Assistant Principal:James Fay

=== Middle school ===
- Principal: Cam Staley
- Assistant Principal: Andy Herr

=== Elementary school ===
- Principal: Chris Renner
- Assistant Principal: Cory Hilty

=== Board of education members ===
- President: Jessica Kelley
- Vice President: Stephanie Ernest
- Rick Kennedy
- Mike Leidy
- Phil White
