= Kathy Krendl =

- Born: 1950 (age 75–76); Spencerville, Ohio, United States
- Education: University of Michigan; Ohio State University; Lawrence University
- Known for: Former Provost of Ohio University; Former President of Otterbein University
- Scientific career
- Fields: Administration
- Workplaces: Ohio University; Otterbein College

Kathy Krendl is an American academic administrator and the former President of Otterbein University, located in Westerville, Ohio. She was the first female President of Otterbein, and the twentieth overall.

== Biography ==
Krendl was born in Spencerville, Ohio as the fourth of six children. She received a B.A. in English from Lawrence University and then an M.A. in Journalism from Ohio State University, later earning a Ph.D. in Communication from the University of Michigan.

Krendl was professor and chair of the Department of Telecommunications in the College of Arts and Sciences at Indiana University, and later dean of the university's School of Continuing Studies, before her tenure at Ohio University. She served as dean of the College of Communication before becoming provost in April 2005.

=== Selection as Otterbein President ===
Krendl's replacement of President C. Brent DeVore was announced on December 5, 2008, and her term began at midnight on July 1, 2009. The selection came after an "eight-month nationwide search" by a committee representing Otterbein's constituencies.

=== Presidency ===
Krendl's first public event as president was acting as grand marshal in the Westerville Independence Day parade. Her formal inauguration took place on October 23, 2009 during Homecoming Weekend.

Krendl has started a blog describing her new position and her observations regarding Otterbein.
