= Zac Dysert =

American football player (born 1990)

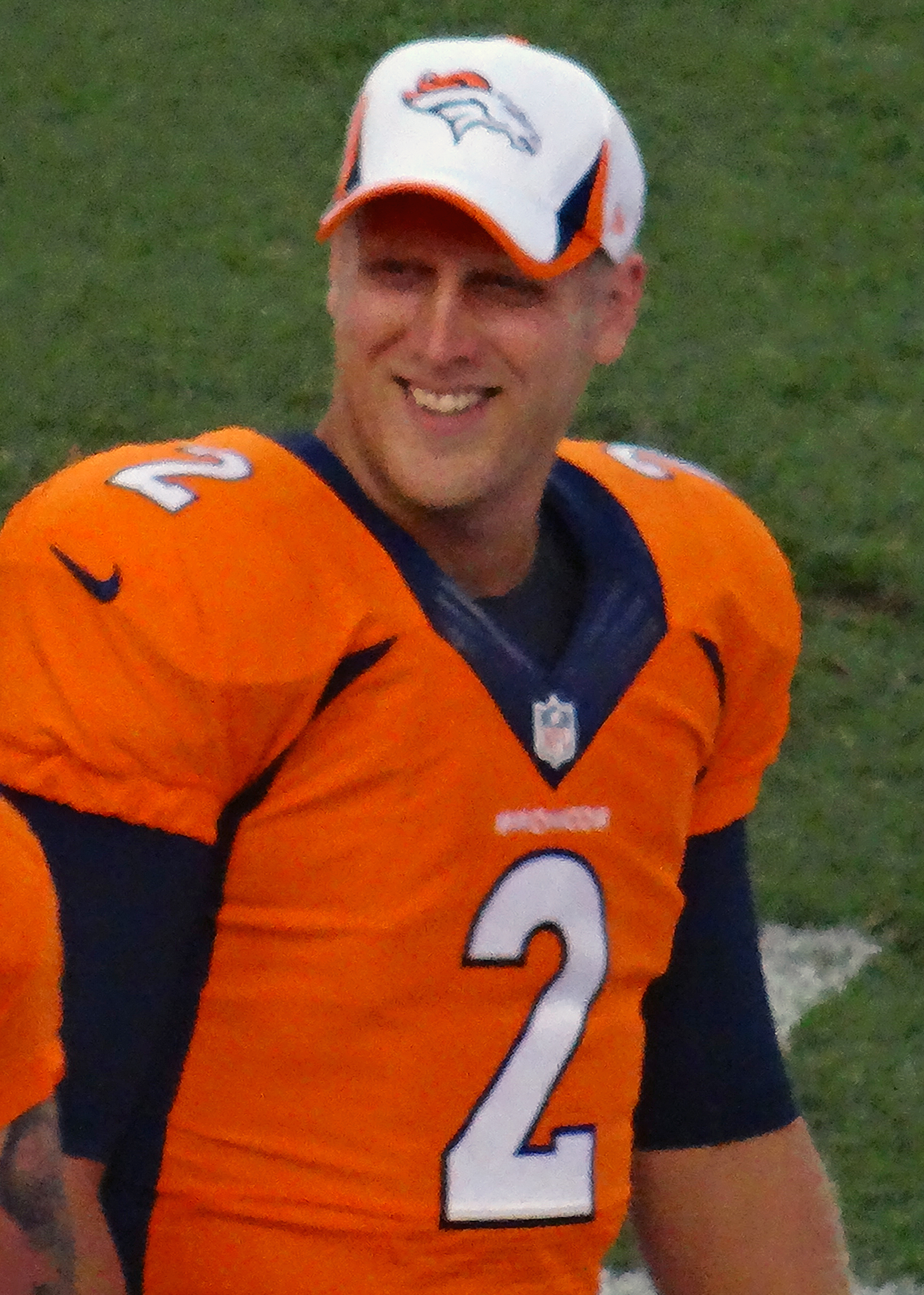
- Dysert with the Denver Broncos in 2013

No. 2, 4, 3
- Position: Quarterback

Personal information
- Born: February 8, 1990 (age 36); Ada, Ohio, U.S.
- Listed height: 6 ft 3 in (1.91 m)
- Listed weight: 223 lb (101 kg)

Career information
- High school: Ada (Ada, Ohio)
- College: Miami (OH) (2008–2012)
- NFL draft: 2013: 7th round, 234th overall pick

Career history
- Denver Broncos (2013–2014); Chicago Bears (2015)*; Houston Texans (2015)*; Buffalo Bills (2015)*; Miami Dolphins (2016)*; Arizona Cardinals (2016); Dallas Cowboys (2017)
- * Offseason or practice squad member only
- Stats at Pro Football Reference

Zac Dysert (born February 8, 1990) is an American former professional football quarterback. He played college football for the Miami RedHawks. He was selected by the Denver Broncos in the seventh round of the 2013 NFL draft. He was on the active roster of both the Broncos and Arizona Cardinals but never played in a regular season NFL game.

== Early life ==
Zac Dysert is the son of Greg and Carla Dysert. He attended Ada High School in Ada, Ohio. During his high school football career, he threw for 11,174 yards, which ranks second all-time in Ohio prep history, and passed for 100 touchdowns, including 35 as a senior, for the Bulldogs. He twice led Ada High School to the state playoffs, including a 2007 state semifinal appearance.

College recruiting
Name	Hometown	School	Height	Weight	Commit date
Zac Dysert; Quarterback	Ada, Ohio	Ada High School (Ohio)	6 ft 3 in (1.91 m)	180 lb (82 kg)	N/A
Zac Dysert; Quarterback	Recruit ratings: Rivals: 247Sports: (74)				
Overall recruit ranking: 247Sports: 34 (St.) 22 (QB-DT) ESPN: 65 (QB-DT)
Note: In many cases, Scout, Rivals, 247Sports, On3, and ESPN may conflict in their listings of height and weight.; In these cases, the average was taken. ESPN grades are on a 100-point scale.; Sources: "Zac Dysert, Ada, Pro-Style Quarterback". 247Sports.

== College career ==
Dysert played collegiately at Miami University in Oxford, Ohio. He was redshirted as a freshman in 2008. He took over as the starting quarterback in 2009 and completed 247 of 401 passes for 2,611 yards with 12 touchdowns and 16 interceptions. As a sophomore in 2010, he played in 10 games, missing three due to a lacerated spleen. He finished his sophomore season with 2,406 passing yards and 13 touchdowns.

As a junior, he completed 295 of 448 passes for 3,513 yards with 23 touchdowns and 11 interceptions. On November 3, 2012, Dysert became Miami's career passing leader, surpassing former RedHawk and retired Pittsburgh Steelers quarterback Ben Roethlisberger in a 27–24 loss to the Buffalo Bulls. He ended his career at Miami with 12,013 passing yards. He earned a bachelor's degree from Miami in December 2012.

=== College statistics ===
Season	Team	Passing								Rushing			
Season	Team	Cmp	Att	Pct	Yds	Y/A	TD	Int	Rtg	Att	Yds	Avg	TD
2009	Miami (OH)	247	401	61.6	2,611	6.5	12	16	118.2	149	258	1.7	5
2010	Miami (OH)	222	343	64.7	2,406	7.0	13	12	129.2	79	27	0.3	1
2011	Miami (OH)	295	448	65.8	3,513	7.8	23	11	143.7	125	115	0.9	4
2012	Miami (OH)	302	480	62.9	3,483	7.3	25	12	136.1	108	265	2.5	2
Career		1,066	1,672	63.8	12,013	7.2	73	51	132.4	461	665	1.4	12

== Professional career ==
=== Denver Broncos ===
Dysert was a quarterback prospect for the 2013 NFL draft. He was selected by the Denver Broncos in the seventh round (234th overall) and the ninth quarterback drafted (one of the smallest quarterback classes in draft history). He signed a rookie contract for four years and $2,208,000 with a $48,200 signing bonus. He earned a spot on the Broncos' 53-man roster as a backup to Peyton Manning and Brock Osweiler.

Dysert spent the entire 2014 season on the Broncos' practice squad. On August 31, 2015, Dysert was cut from the Broncos.

=== Chicago Bears ===
On September 1, 2015, he was claimed by the Chicago Bears. He was waived by the Bears on September 6.

=== Houston Texans ===
Dysert was signed by the Houston Texans on September 6, 2015, to their practice squad. On November 24, Dysert was released from the team.

=== Buffalo Bills ===
Dysert was signed to the practice squad of the Buffalo Bills on December 21, 2015.

=== Miami Dolphins ===
Dysert was signed to a reserve/futures contract by the Miami Dolphins on January 19, 2016. On September 3, Dysert was released by the team.

=== Arizona Cardinals ===
On September 4, 2016, Dysert was signed to the Arizona Cardinals' practice squad. On October 3, he was promoted to the Cardinals' active roster. He was released by the team on October 10, and re-signed to the practice squad two days later. He was promoted to the active roster on December 13.

On March 7, 2017, Dysert re-signed with the Cardinals. On June 2, he was waived by the Cardinals.

=== Dallas Cowboys ===
On June 5, 2017, Dysert was claimed off waivers by the Dallas Cowboys to replace rookie quarterback Austin Appleby, who was having problems with the center exchanges during practices. On July 26, it was reported that Dysert would miss the entire upcoming season, due to a herniated disc he suffered while reaching for a bag. He was waived/injured on July 28 and was placed on the injured reserve list on July 31.

== Post-playing career ==
Dysert's high school number was formally retired by the school in 2016. returned to Ada after he was released by the Cowboys in 2017. He was briefly an assistant football coach at Ada High School. Dysert now works as a private quarterback coach in Ohio.
