= Anthony Wayne High School =

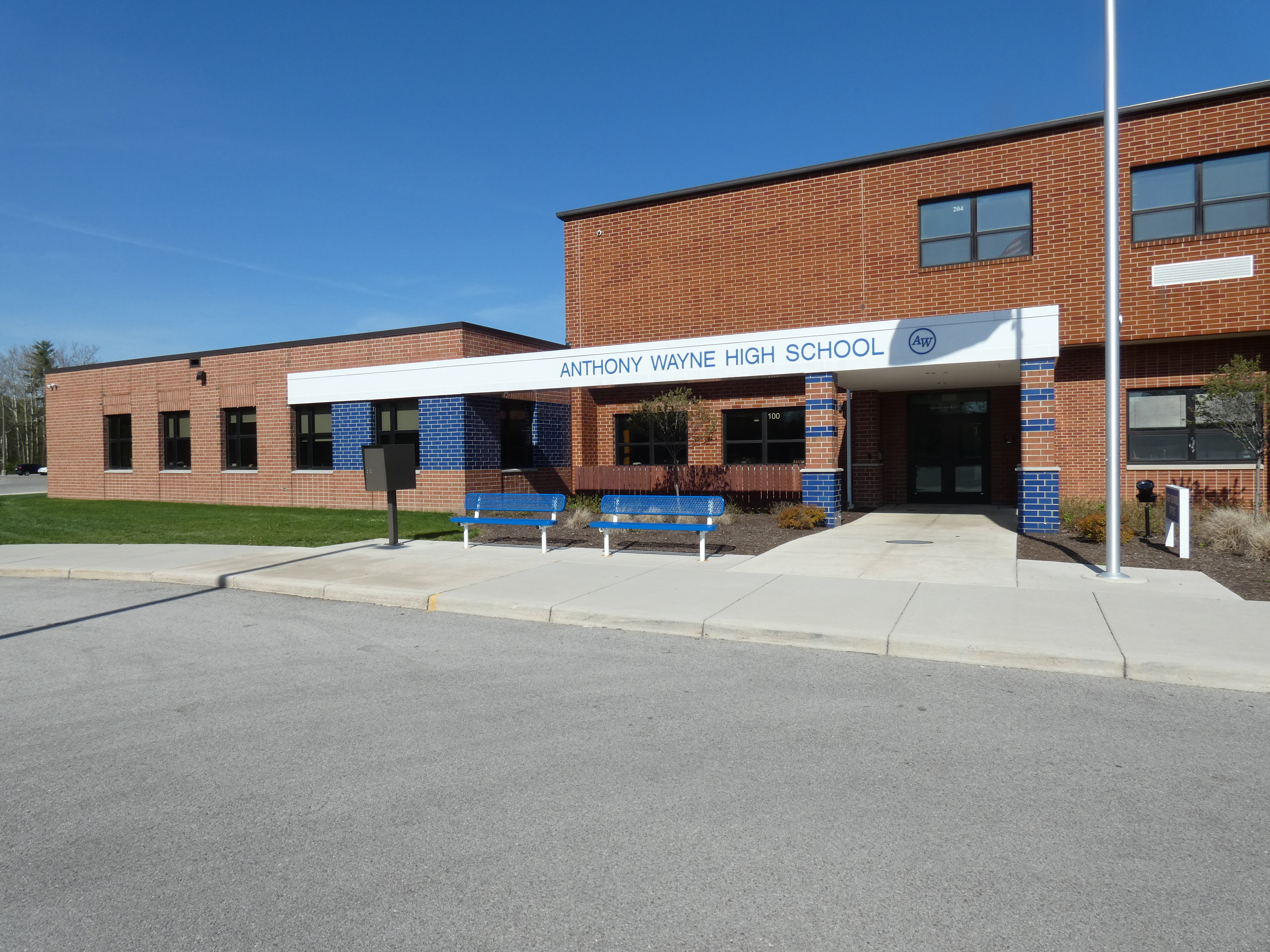

Location
- 5967 Finzel Road; Whitehouse, Ohio 43571; United States
- Coordinates: 41°31′56″N 83°46′47″W

Information
- Type: Public, coeducational
- Established: 1951
- School district: Anthony Wayne Local School District
- Principal: Jon Burke
- Teaching staff: 52.00 (on an FTE basis)
- Grades: 9–12
- Enrollment: 1,330 (2019–20)
- Student to teacher ratio: 25.58
- Colors: Royal blue and white
- Fight song: Anthony Wayne Fight Song
- Athletics conference: Northern Lakes League Northwest Hockey Conference
- Team name: Generals
- Yearbook: Trailblazer
- Website: www.anthonywayneschools.org/AWHS

Anthony Wayne High School is a public high school in Whitehouse, Ohio, a suburb of Toledo. The school has an enrollment of approximately 1,330 students in grades 9–12 as of 2019–20. The school is named for General Anthony Wayne, who led troops in the nearby Battle of Fallen Timbers during the Northwest Indian War.

The Anthony Wayne High School was established in 1951. It is the consolidation of Monclova, Waterville, and Whitehouse Schools. The school was featured in the 2010 MTV reality series If You Really Knew Me.

== Athletics ==
The athletic teams of Anthony Wayne High School are known as the Generals and wear uniform colors of royal blue and white. The Generals have 19 varsity sports that compete in the Northern Lakes League (NLL) in northwest Ohio, with the exception of the varsity ice hockey team, which competes in the Northwest Hockey Conference. They compete in the Ohio High School Athletic Association (OHSAA), mostly in Division I.

AWHS supports cross country, football, golf, soccer, tennis, girls' volleyball, basketball, bowling, boys' hockey, swimming, boys' wrestling, baseball, softball, lacrosse, dance team and track. Anthony Wayne also features several club sports including crew, skiing and cheerleading.

=== State championships ===
- Boys' baseball - 2025
- Girls’ Soccer - 2025
- Girls' softball- 2003
- Boys’ golf - 2023

==== Other championships ====
- Cheerleading Division 1 Mount - 2003, 2004, 2005, 2006, 2007, 2008, 2009, 2010, 2023

== Band ==
The marching band, known as the Marching Generals, has participated in several large-scale events, such as the London New Year's Day Parade, Indianapolis 500, Orange Bowl twice, Cotton Bowl, Fiesta Bowl, Kentucky Derby Parade, Disney Parks Christmas Day Parade, Chicago Miracle Mile Lights Parade, Detroit America's Thanksgiving Day Parade, and Philadelphia Thanksgiving Day Parade.

== Notable alumni ==
- Travis Baltz - former professional football player
- Andrew Donnal - former professional football player in the National Football League (NFL)
- Gracie Dzienny - Actress, SupahNinjas (Nickelodeon), Bumblebee, Zoo
- Taylor Leach - Soccer defender in the National Women's Soccer League
- Monica McFawn - author, Flannery O'Connor Award winner
- Scott Wozniak - YouTuber, creator of Scott the Woz series
