= Crestview Local School District (Van Wert County) =

School district in Ohio

Crestview Local School District is a school district serving students in Convoy, Van Wert County, Ohio, United States along with students in Willshire, Pleasant, Harrison, Tully, and Union townships in Van Wert county in the state of Ohio.

The school district is about one half hour away from the second largest city in Indiana, Fort Wayne.

== Operating Schools ==
There is only one school in the school district, it is listed as following:

- Crestview Local School (grades K to 12) - includes Crestview High School

This school operates all grades and administrative offices in Convoy. The school district operated multiple buildings in the district prior to consolidation after a fire destroyed the building in Union township and the Wren building was closed.

== Interesting facts ==
- The school district borders the Ohio state and Indiana line.
- Crestview Local School serves students in more than one village.
- Also known as "The Academy".

== Superintendent ==
The superintendent of the Crestview Local School District is Matt Dubé
