= Delphos City School District =

School district in Ohio

Delphos Local School District, also referred to as Delphos Jefferson, is a school district that serves students in Allen and Van Wert counties in the state of Ohio. The treasurer is Brad Rostorfer and the assistant treasurer is Carol Sherman. The school district operates one elementary school, one middle school and one high school. Franklin Elementary school is located in Allen County, while Delphos Jefferson Middle School and Delphos Jefferson High School are located in Van Wert County.

== Schools ==
=== Elementary schools ===
- Franklin Elementary School

=== Middle schools ===
- Delphos Jefferson Middle School

=== High schools ===
- Delphos Jefferson High School
