= Columbus Grove Local School District =

School district in Ohio

Columbus Grove Local School District serves students education in the village of Columbus Grove, Putnam County, Ohio, United States. The current superintendent of Columbus Grove Schools is Nick Verhoff.

== Schools ==
- Columbus Grove Elementary School
- Columbus Grove High School
- Columbus Grove St. Anthony's Elementary School

== Superintendent and School Board ==
Superintendent's Office

- Nick Verhoff, Superintendent
- Mark Ellerbrock, Treasurer
- Brad Calvalege, Elementary Principal
- Brian Best, High School/Middle School Principal

Board of Education

- Brad Brubaker, President
- Ned A. Stechschulte, Board Member
- Brian Jones, Vice President
- Derek Oswald, Board Member
- Derek Vance, Board Member
