= Temple Christian School (Lima, Ohio) =

Location
- 982 Brower Road; Lima, (Allen County), Ohio 45801; United States
- Coordinates: 40°46′13″N 84°7′11″W

Information
- Established: 1976
- School district: Elida
- Superintendent: Bruce Bowman
- Chairperson: Jason Szuch
- Principal: Bruce Bowman
- Grades: K–12
- Colors: Navy Blue and Silver
- Athletics conference: Northwest Central Conference
- Team name: Pioneers
- Tuition: $5068 (2020;1st child - elementary)"Tuition Rates".
- Website: https://www.tcspioneers.org

Temple Christian School is a private Christian high school located in Lima, Ohio. Temple was founded in 1976 as a ministry of the Lima Baptist Temple. It is a K-12 traditional Christian school of 226 students.

== Organization ==
Temple Christian School was founded in 1976 as a ministry of Lima Baptist Temple. Students come from a variety of different churches and denominations in the Lima, Ohio area, but are required to share many of the same core evangelical beliefs.

== Mission statement ==
The mission at Temple Christian School is to glorify God by providing for students a Christ-centered education marked by excellence and grounded in Biblical truth.

== Athletics ==
Temple Christian School provides a number of team sports for students to participate in.

- Fall - Soccer, Volleyball, Golf
- Winter - Basketball, Bowling, Cheerleading
- Spring - Baseball, Track
