= Huron High School (Ohio) =

Public high school in Ohio, United States

Location
- 710 Cleveland Road West; Huron; Huron, (Erie County), Ohio 44839; United States
- 41°23′52″N 82°33′53″W

Information
- Type: Public, Coeducational high school
- Superintendent: James J. Tatman
- Principal: Tim Lamb
- Teaching staff: 22.40 (on an FTE basis)
- Grades: 9–12
- Enrollment: 377 (2023–2024)
- Student to teacher ratio: 16.83
- Colors: Red and gray
- Athletics conference: Northern Ohio Conference
- Team name: Tigers
- Website: hhs.huronk12.org

Huron High School is a public high school in Huron, Ohio. It is the only high school in the Huron City Schools district. The athletic teams are known as the Huron Tigers. The school is a member of the Northern Ohio Conference.

== Athletics ==
=== Championships ===
==== Ohio High School Athletic Association ====
State championships:

- Boys' track and field – 1974, 2024, 2025
- Girls' basketball – 1983
- Girls' volleyball – 1999, 2002, 2009, 2014, 2020
- Boys' football – 1953

== Notable alumni ==
- Jim Campbell, former MLB executive (Detroit Tigers)
- Matt Maloney, former MLB player (Cincinnati Reds, Minnesota Twins)
- Cody Thompson, current NFL player (Tampa Bay Buccaneers)
