= Bellevue High School (Ohio) =

Location
- 200 Oakland Avenue; Bellevue, Ohio 44811; United States; 41.282°N 82.843°W

Information
- Type: Public
- Established: 1870
- School district: Bellevue City School District
- Principal: Anthony Panfalone
- Grades: 9–12
- Enrollment: 560 (2025-2026)
- Colors: Red and White
- Athletics conference: Northern Ohio Conference
- Team name: Redmen & Lady Red
- Website: https://bhs.bellevueschools.org/

Bellevue High School is a public high school in Bellevue, Ohio. It is the only high school in the Bellevue City School District. Athletic teams are known as the Redmen and Ladyred. A former member of the Northern Ohio League (1944-2017), Bellevue joined the Sandusky Bay Conference in 2017, and later formed the Northern Ohio Conference in 2026 with nine other schools that left the Sandusky Bay Conference. The current building was built in 1962. In 2025, their girls basketball team won the d4 high school state championship.

== State championships ==
- Boys Basketball – 1945
- Boys Baseball – 1985
- Boys Cross Country – 1984, 1985
- Girls Basketball – 2025
- Girls Cross Country – 1987

== Notable alumni ==
- Arthur F. Gorham (Class of 1932) - Led paratroopers of the 82nd Airborne Division during the invasion of Sicily during World War II; twice awarded the Distinguished Service Cross
- Vice Admiral John W. Greenslade (Class of 1895) - Vice Admiral & U.S. Commander of the Pacific-Southern Naval Coastal Frontier during World War II
- Christi Paul (Class of 1987) - News Anchor on HLN
- Brad Snyder (Class of 2000) - The 2003 Mid-American Conference Baseball Player of the Year, an NCAA Division I All-American, and Outfielder in Chicago Cubs minor
- Sadie Lea Weidner (1875–1939) - American missionary to Japan

== Bibliography ==
- Drown, William. "Bellevue and Historic Lyme Village (OH)." Chicago: Arcadia Publishing, 2002. ISBN 978-0-7385-2023-0.
