= Spencerville, Ohio =

- Village
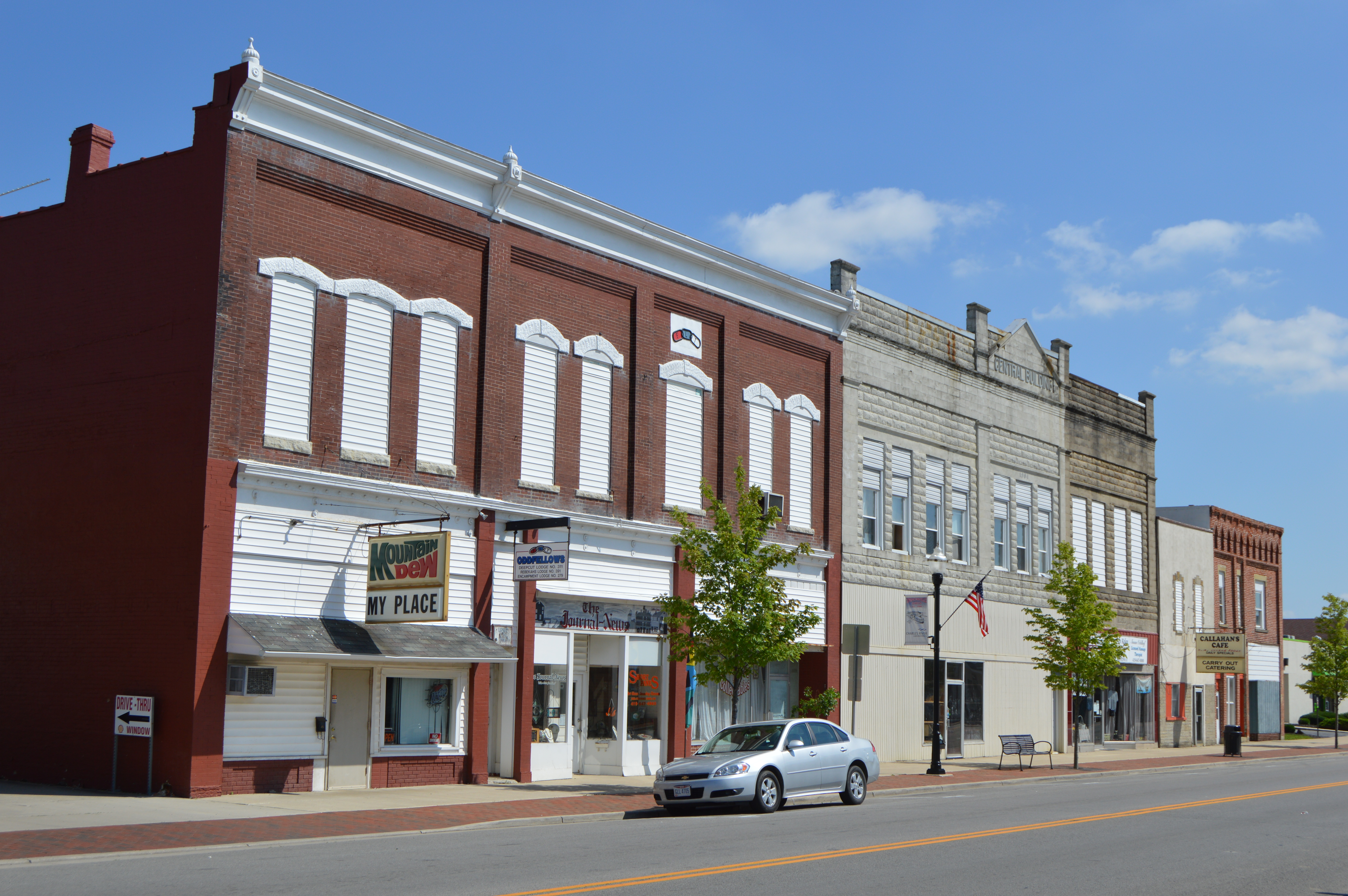
- Broadway Street downtown

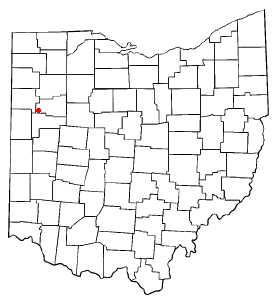
- Location of Spencerville, Ohio

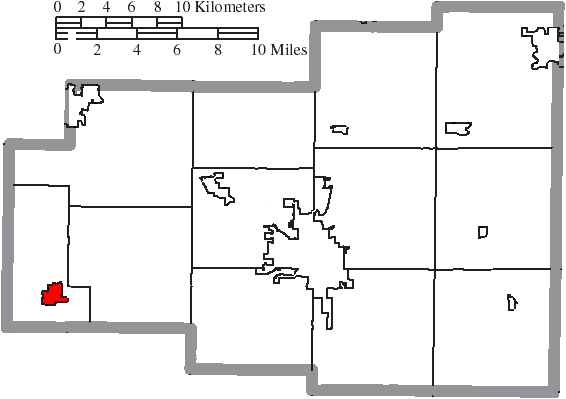
- Location of Spencerville in Allen County
- Coordinates: 40°42′29″N 84°21′10″W
- Country: United States
- State: Ohio
- County: Allen
- Township: Spencer

Government
  - Mayor: Phillip Briggs
  - Administrator: Sean Chapman

Area
  - Total: 0.97 sq mi (2.50 km^{2})
  - Land: 0.97 sq mi (2.50 km^{2})
  - Water: 0 sq mi (0.00 km^{2})
- Elevation: 830 ft (250 m)

Population (2020)
  - Total: 2,198
  - Density: 2,278.5/sq mi (879.72/km^{2})
- Time zone: UTC-5 (Eastern (EST))
  - Summer (DST): UTC-4 (EDT)
- ZIP code: 45887
- Area code: 419
- FIPS code: 39-74034
- GNIS feature ID: 2399872
- Website: spencervilleoh.com

Spencerville is a village in Allen County, Ohio, United States. The population was 2,198 at the 2020 census. It is included in the Lima, Ohio Metropolitan Statistical Area.

== History ==
Spencerville was platted in 1844 when the Miami and Erie Canal was extended to that point. The village was named after William Spencer, a canal planner. An early variant name was Acadia. A post office called Acadia was established in 1854, and the name was changed to Spencerville in 1867.

== Geography ==
According to the United States Census Bureau, the village has a total area of 0.97 square miles (2.51 km^{2}), all land.

== Demographics ==
Historical population
Census	Pop.	Note	%±
1870	364		—
1880	532		46.2%
1890	1,266		138.0%
1900	1,874		48.0%
1910	1,748		−6.7%
1920	1,543		−11.7%
1930	1,612		4.5%
1940	1,623		0.7%
1950	1,826		12.5%
1960	2,061		12.9%
1970	2,241		8.7%
1980	2,184		−2.5%
1990	2,288		4.8%
2000	2,235		−2.3%
2010	2,223		−0.5%
2020	2,198		−1.1%
U.S. Decennial Census

=== 2010 census ===
As of the census of 2010, there were 2,223 people, 817 households, and 583 families living in the village. The population density was 2,291.8 inhabitants per square mile (884.9/km^{2}). There were 886 housing units at an average density of 913.4 per square mile (352.7/km^{2}). The racial makeup of the village was 96.5% White, 0.4% African American, 0.2% Native American, 0.4% Asian, and 2.5% from two or more races. Hispanic or Latino of any race were 0.7% of the population.

There were 817 households, of which 40.3% had children under the age of 18 living with them, 49.3% were married couples living together, 16.2% had a female householder with no husband present, 5.9% had a male householder with no wife present, and 28.6% were non-families. 24.6% of all households were made up of individuals, and 12.2% had someone living alone who was 65 years of age or older. The average household size was 2.66 and the average family size was 3.15.

The median age in the village was 33.4 years. 30.6% of residents were under the age of 18; 7.8% were between the ages of 18 and 24; 25.5% were from 25 to 44; 20.8% were from 45 to 64; and 15.2% were 65 years of age or older. The gender makeup of the village was 48.7% male and 51.3% female.

=== 2000 census ===
As of the census of 2000, there were 2,235 people, 845 households, and 599 families living in the village. The population density was 2,454.9 people per square mile (947.8 people/km^{2}). There were 903 housing units at an average density of 991.8 per square mile (382.9/km^{2}). The racial makeup of the village was 97.72% White, 0.63% African American, 0.18% Native American, 0.09% Asian, and 1.39% from two or more races. Hispanic or Latino of any race were 0.31% of the population.

There were 845 households, out of which 35.9% had children under the age of 18 living with them, 53.4% were married couples living together, 13.1% had a female householder with no husband present, and 29.1% were non-families. 25.4% of all households were made up of individuals, and 13.0% had someone living alone who was 65 years of age or older. The average household size was 2.54 and the average family size was 3.03.

In the village, the population was spread out, with 28.5% under the age of 18, 7.2% from 18 to 24, 27.2% from 25 to 44, 20.4% from 45 to 64, and 16.6% who were 65 years of age or older. The median age was 35 years. For every 100 females there were 89.9 males. For every 100 females age 18 and over, there were 82.9 males.

The median income for a household in the village was $32,619, and the median income for a family was $40,625. Males had a median income of $30,701 versus $22,708 for females. The per capita income for the village was $17,140. About 12.3% of families and 13.0% of the population were below the poverty line, including 20.4% of those under age 18 and 7.9% of those age 65 or over.

== Education ==
Spencerville built a new school that houses K-12 and opened in 2008. Spencerville High School sports participate in the Northwest Conference, an athletic body sanctioned by the Ohio High School Athletic Association.

== Notable residents ==
- Kathy Krendl, President of Otterbein University
