= Columbus Grove High School =

Public school in Ohio, United States

Location
- 201 W. Cross St. Columbus Grove, (Putnam County), Ohio 45830; United States; 40°55′22″N 84°03′22″W

Information
- Type: Public, coeducational high school
- Opened: 1909
- School district: Columbus Grove Local School District
- Superintendent: Brian Best
- NCES School ID: 390502303882
- Principal: Chad Brinkman
- Teaching staff: 11.60 (FTE)
- Grades: 9–12
- Enrollment: 247 (2024–2025)
- Student to teacher ratio: 21.29
- Colors: Red and gray
- Fight song: Onward Bulldogs, Washington and Lee Swing
- Athletics conference: Northwest Conference; Putnam County League
- Mascot: Spike the Bulldog
- Nickname: Bulldogs
- Rival: Kalida Wildcats, Pandora-Gilboa Rockets, Bluffton Pirates
- Website: cgbulldogs.org/hsms

Columbus Grove High School is a public high school in Columbus Grove, Ohio, United States. It is the only high school in the Columbus Grove Local School District. Athletic teams are known as the Bulldogs, and they compete in the Ohio High School Athletic Association as a member of both the Northwest Conference and Putnam County League.

== History ==
Columbus Grove High School opened in 1909, with the consolidation of early Columbus Grove and Pleasant Township area schools.

Columbus Grove opened its first gymnasium in 1933, replacing earlier athletic facilities in Columbus's city facilities. Additional expansions and improvements occurred throughout the 20th century. Another gymnasium was built for the new school in the late 1950s, with Columbus Grove playing their first home game on January 31, 1958.

Columbus Grove constructed a new school in 2012 consolidating the school district into one PK–12 building. The new facility featured updated classrooms, technology and athletic spaces, such as another new gymnasium. The overall project costed roughly $9.3 million, with the projected being finished just $1.75 million under budget.

== Athletics ==
Columbus Grove High School currently offers:

- Baseball
- Basketball
- Cross country
- Golf
- Football
- Soccer
- Track and field
- Volleyball
- Wrestling

=== OHSAA State Championships ===
- Football – 2003
- Boys track and field – 2003, 2026
- Girls' basketball – 2025
- Boys' cross country – 2023
- Girls track and field – 2026

=== Associated Press Poll Champions ===
- Boys' Basketball – 2020
