= Columbus Grove, Ohio =

- Village
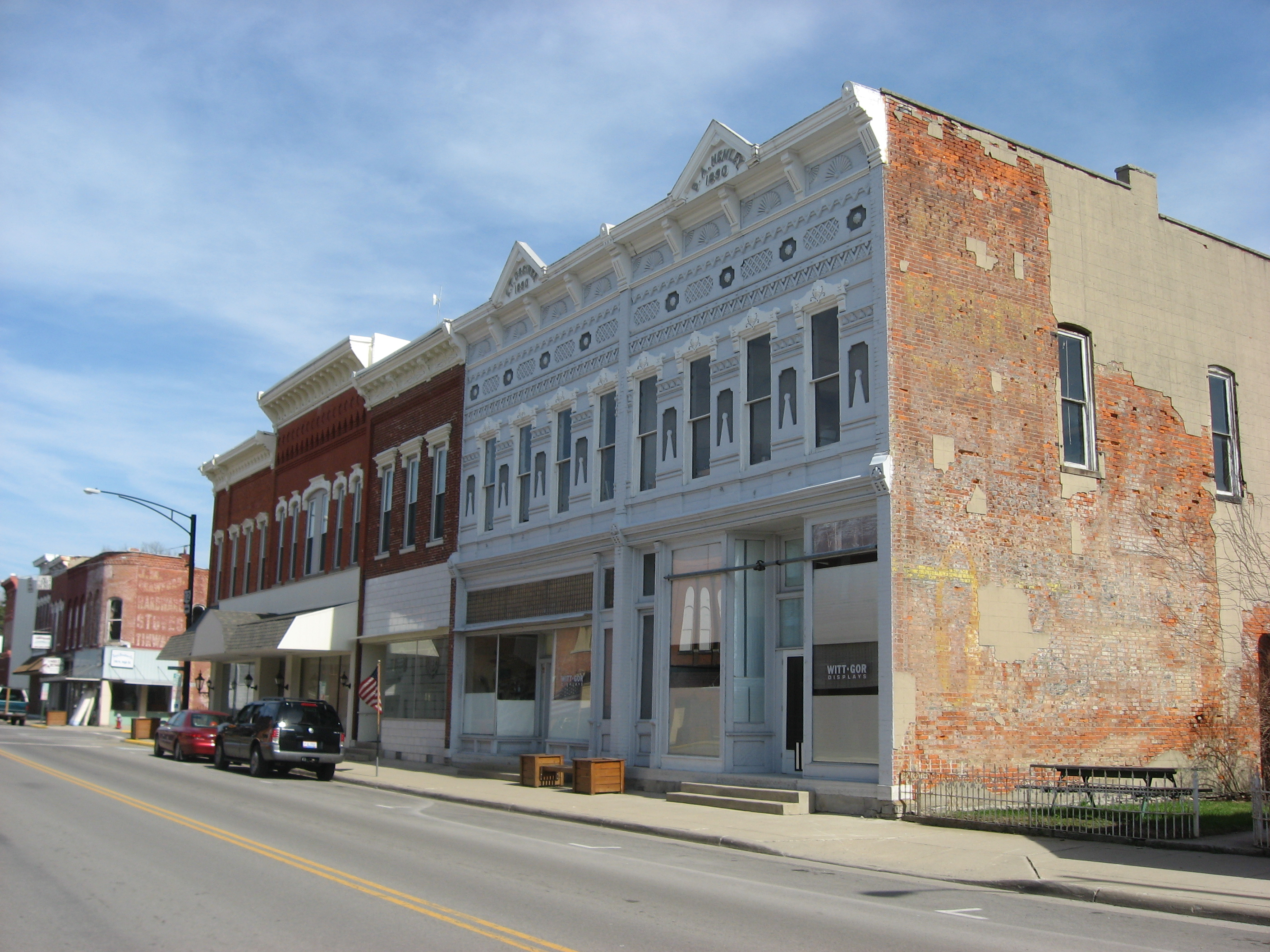
- Downtown Columbus Grove
- Nicknames: The Grove, Axe-Handle Junction
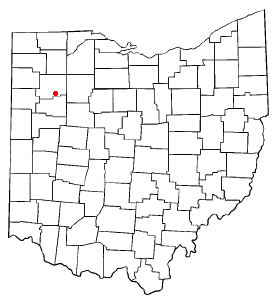
- Location of Columbus Grove, Ohio

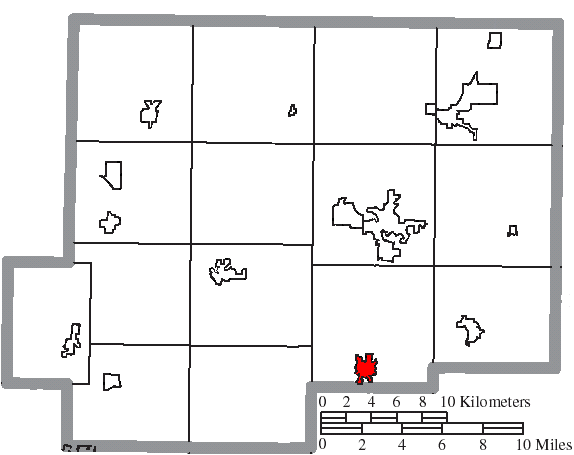
- Location of Columbus Grove in Putnam County
- Coordinates: 40°55′14″N 84°03′35″W
- Country: United States
- State: Ohio
- County: Putnam

Area
  - Total: 1.24 sq mi (3.20 km^{2})
  - Land: 1.23 sq mi (3.18 km^{2})
  - Water: 0.0077 sq mi (0.02 km^{2})
- Elevation: 764 ft (233 m)

Population (2020)
  - Total: 2,160
  - Estimate (2023): 2,131
  - Density: 1,759.2/sq mi (679.25/km^{2})
- Time zone: UTC-5 (Eastern (EST))
  - Summer (DST): UTC-4 (EDT)
- ZIP code: 45830
- Area code: 419
- FIPS code: 39-18014
- GNIS feature ID: 2398606
- Website: https://www.columbusgrove.org/

Columbus Grove is a village in Pleasant Township, Putnam County, Ohio, United States. The population was 2,160 at the 2020 census.

== History ==
Columbus Grove was founded in 1842. A large share of the early settlers being natives of Columbus, Ohio caused the name to be selected. A post office called Columbus Grove has been in operation since 1862. The village was incorporated in 1864. President Grover Cleveland made an impromptu speech here from a train caboose during his Goodwill Tour of 1887.

The village made national news on June 29, 2012, when the June 2012 Mid-Atlantic and Midwest derecho caused severe damage to a downtown business.

The village celebrated its sesquicentennial in June 2014.

On October 10, 2024, an SUV was hit by a CSX train at approximately 9:35 a.m. According to the Putnam County Deputies, 23-year-old Honesty Mallory of Lima, Ohio was heading south on Main Street, when she was struck by a CSX train that was also heading south. Mallory and two other passengers were able to get out of the car on their own; the two passengers were taken to Mercy Health-St. Rita's Medical Center with non-life-threatening injuries. The incident remains under investigation.

== Geography ==
Ohio state routes 12 and 65 intersect in the village.

According to the United States Census Bureau, the village has a total area of 1.08 square miles (2.80 km^{2}), all land.

== Demographics ==
Historical population
Census	Pop.	Note	%±
1850	118		—
1870	578		—
1880	1,392		140.8%
1890	1,677		20.5%
1900	1,935		15.4%
1910	1,802		−6.9%
1920	1,768		−1.9%
1930	1,633		−7.6%
1940	1,737		6.4%
1950	1,936		11.5%
1960	2,104		8.7%
1970	2,290		8.8%
1980	2,313		1.0%
1990	2,231		−3.5%
2000	2,200		−1.4%
2010	2,137		−2.9%
2020	2,160		1.1%
2023 (est.)	2,131	▼	−1.3%
U.S. Decennial Census

=== 2010 census ===
As of the census of 2010, there were 2,137 people, 858 households, and 594 families living in the village. The population density was 1,978.7 inhabitants per square mile (764.0/km^{2}). There were 916 housing units at an average density of 848.1 per square mile (327.5/km^{2}). The racial makeup of the village was 94.2% White, 0.6% Native American, 0.2% Asian, 1.8% from other races, and 2.3% from two or more races. Hispanic or Latino of any race were 4.8% of the population.

There were 858 households, of which 34.3% had children under the age of 18 living with them, 51.2% were married couples living together, 12.9% had a female householder with no husband present, 5.1% had a male householder with no wife present, and 30.8% were non-families. 27.4% of all households were made up of individuals, and 12.6% had someone living alone who was 65 years of age or older. The average household size was 2.49 and the average family size was 3.03.

The median age in the village was 37.1 years. 27.7% of residents were under the age of 18; 8.9% were between the ages of 18 and 24; 23.8% were from 25 to 44; 23.8% were from 45 to 64; and 15.8% were 65 years of age or older. The gender makeup of the village was 48.6% male and 51.4% female.

=== 2000 census ===
At the 2000 census, there were 2,200 people, 880 households and 616 families living in the village. The population density was 2,144.9 inhabitants per square mile (828.2/km^{2}). There were 927 housing units at an average density of 903.8 per square mile (349.0/km^{2}). The racial makeup of the village was 97.50% White, 0.50% Native American, 0.05% Asian, 1.36% from other races, and 0.59% from two or more races. Hispanic or Latino of any race were 3.73% of the population.

There were 880 households, of which 343.5% had children under the age of 18 living with them, 53.1% were married couples living together, 12.8% had a female householder with no husband present, and 30.0% were non-families. 27.2% of all households were made up of individuals, and 13.6% had someone living alone who was 65 years of age or younger. The average household size was 2.50 and the average family size was 3.05.

27.1% of the population were under the age of 18, 9.7% from 18 to 24, 27.4% from 25 to 44, 20.9% from 45 to 64, and 15.0% who were 65 years of age or older. The median age was 35 years. For every 100 females there were 90.8 males. For every 100 females age 18 and over, there were 90.4 males.

The median household income was $42,409 and the median family income was $48,750. Males had a median income of $37,434 compared with $21,875 for females. The per capita income for the village was $18,316. About 4.6% of families and 5.3% of the population were below the poverty line, including 7.2% of those under age 18 and 6.6% of those age 65 or over.

== Government ==
Columbus Grove is governed by a mayor-council government. The town hall, which also serves as the police station, is located on the corner of East Sycamore St. and N Broadway St. The fire station is located on S Main St. A new fire station is currently under construction on East Sycamore St.

== Education ==
Columbus Grove Local School District operates one public elementary school and Columbus Grove High School. St. Anthony of Padua School is a Roman Catholic institution.

Columbus Grove has a public library, a branch of the Putnam County District Library.

== Notable people ==
- Dean Jagger, actor
- Justin LeHew, highly decorated US Marine
- Kenny Richey, death row prisoner
