= Bath High School (Ohio) =

Location
- 2850 Bible Road; Lima 45801; United States; 40°46′21″N 84°3′16″W

Information
- Motto: "Success is a choice, your choice."
- School district: Bath Local School District
- Principal: Brian Jesko
- Grades: 9–12
- Colors: Columbia blue and gold
- Athletics conference: Western Buckeye League
- Mascot: Wally the Wildcat and Wanda the Wildkitten
- Team name: Wildcats
- Newspaper: The Paw Print
- Website: bathwildcats.org

Bath High School (BHS), sometimes called Lima Bath, is a public high school in Bath Township, near Lima, Ohio, United States. It is the only high school in the Bath Local School District.

== Athletics ==
The school's mascot is a wildcat for boys' sports, and a wildkitten for girls'. They are members of the Western Buckeye League.

=== State championships ===
- Boys golf - 2005
- Girls basketball – 1987
- Softball – 2001, 2014

== Recognition ==
U.S. News & World Report listed Bath High School as a bronze medal school in their America's Best High Schools rankings in 2009 and 2015. BHS was the only high school in Allen County to be recognized. The Ohio Department of Education named BHS a "School of Promise" in 2011, 2012, and 2014 along with "Excellent" ratings in the state report card every year from 2000 through 2013.
