= Spencerville High School (Ohio) =

Location
- 2500 Wisher Drive; Spencerville, (Allen County), Ohio 45887; United States
- Coordinates: 40°42′7″N 84°20′40″W

Information
- Superintendent: Cindy Endsley
- Principal: Scott Gephart
- Teaching staff: 17.00 (FTE)
- Grades: 9–12
- Student to teacher ratio: 19.71
- Colors: Black and White
- Athletics conference: Northwest Conference
- Team name: Bearcats
- Website: https://hs.spencervillebearcats.com/

Spencerville High School is a public high school located in Spencerville, Ohio in Allen County, Ohio.

== Background ==
Spencerville High School first graduated a class in 1888.
