= North Baltimore High School =

Location
- 2012 Tiger Drive; North Baltimore, (Wood County), Ohio 45872; United States
- Coordinates: 41°11′16″N 83°39′58″W

Information
- Type: Public, Coeducational high school
- Superintendent: Ryan Delaney
- Principal: Chad Kiser
- Teaching staff: 15.50 (FTE)
- Grades: 9–12
- Student to teacher ratio: 8.06
- Colors: Orange & Black
- Athletics conference: Northwest Central Conference
- Nickname: Tigers
- Website: https://www.nbls.org/district/hsms

North Baltimore High School is a public high school in North Baltimore, Ohio, United States. It is the only high school in the North Baltimore Local School District. Their nickname is the Tigers. They are members of the Blanchard Valley Conference.

== Ohio High School Athletic Association State Championships ==
- Boys Golf – 1980
