= Bluffton High School (Ohio) =

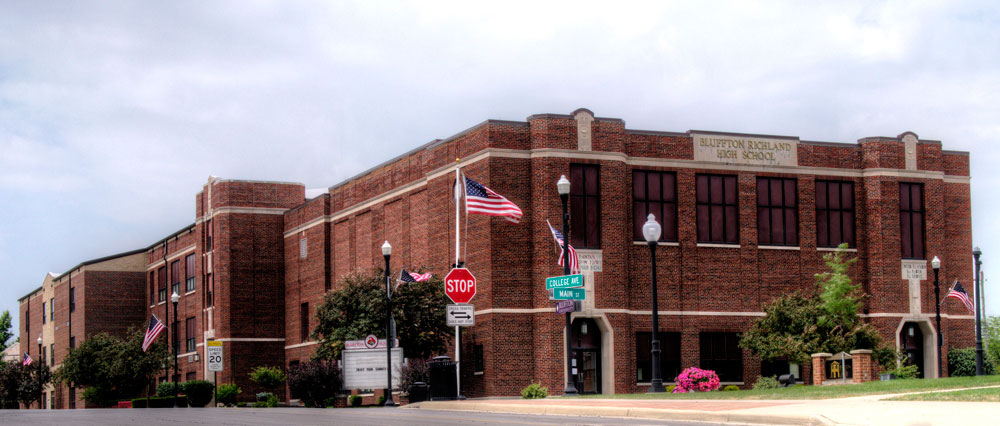

Location
- 106 West College Avenue; Bluffton, (Allen County), Ohio 45817-1242; United States
- 40°53′34″N 83°53′39″W

Information
- Type: Public
- Established: 1871
- Superintendent: Greg Denecker
- Principal: Mike Minnig
- Enrollment: 414 (2023-2024)
- Campus: Rural
- Colors: Red and White
- Athletics conference: Northwest Conference
- Nickname: Pirates
- Website: https://hs.blufftonschools.org/

Bluffton High School is a public high school located in Bluffton, Ohio in Allen County, Ohio. It is the only high school in the Bluffton Exempted Village School District. Bluffton High School's mascot is the pirate.

== Academic performance ==
Bluffton High School received an Excellent with Distinction rating on their 2007-2008 School Year Report Card as determined by the Ohio Department of Education, met 30 out of 30 state indicators, and received a 104.6 out of possible 120 points on the performance index. Their 2006-07 graduation rate was at 97.8%, had a 22 mean ACT score, and had 19.1% of students graduate with an Honors Diploma.

== Ohio High School Athletic Association State Championships ==
- Wrestling - 1981
- Boys Track and Field - 2008

== Notable alumni ==
- Trevor Bassitt, track and field athlete
