= Elida High School =

Location
- 401 East North Street; Elida, Ohio 45807; United States; 40°47′25″N 84°12′8″W

Information
- Type: Public high school
- Established: 1892
- School district: Elida Local School District
- Teaching staff: 35.00 (FTE)
- Grades: 9–12
- Enrollment: 593 (2023-2024)
- Student to teacher ratio: 16.94
- Campus type: Rural
- Colors: Orange, black, gold
- Fight song: Across the Field
- Athletics conference: Western Buckeye League
- Team name: Bulldogs
- Accreditation: Ohio Department of Education
- Yearbook: Reflector II
- Website: home.elida.k12.oh.us

Elida High School is a public high school in Elida, Ohio, United States, that is part of Elida Local School District. The school athletic teams are known as the Bulldogs, and the school colors are orange, black, and gold. The school's alma mater (Carmen Ohio) and fight song (Across the Field) are both based on those used at the Ohio State University except "Ohio's praise" is replaced at the beginning with "Elida's praise", and "Ohio" is again replaced at the end with "orange, black, gold".

== History ==
In 1868, the Elida School District was created and was moved into a new building on Main Street (now the site of the fire department) at a cost of about $5,000. The high school was added in 1892 at about $10,000 with S.D. Crites as the first principal. The first Elida graduating class consisted of four students in 1893. The next home of Elida High School was erected in 1914 with a major addition of a junior high in 1956. The back wing was added in 1959. The first football field ran east to west behind the old part of the school. Thanks to the efforts of Ellsworth Wiferd, who donated 600 hours of work, lights were added to the field in 1946. A football stadium was built behind the high school and dedicated in 1961 to the memory of Roger Eugene Kraft a young man who died during a football game at Pandora in October 1959. The field house was built in front of the junior high addition in 1973.

A new high school building opened in 2011, featuring 169,000 square feet (15,700 m^{2}) of space with a 670-seat auditorium and 1,200-seat gymnasium. The building was dedicated September 25, 2011.

== Athletics ==
=== State championships ===
- Baseball - 1976
- Girls Basketball – 1997
