= Perry High School (Lima, Ohio) =

School in Lima, Ohio, United States

Location
- 2770 East Breese Road; Lima, Ohio 45806-9802; United States; 40°41′14″N 84°3′15″W

Information
- Type: Public
- School district: Perry Local School District
- NCES School ID: 390457802342
- Principal: Tony Grigsby
- Teaching staff: 18.00 (FTE)
- Grades: 7–12
- Enrollment: 296 (2024–25)
- Student to teacher ratio: 16.44
- Campus type: Rural
- Colors: Red and white
- Athletics conference: Northwest Central Conference
- Team name: Commodores
- Accreditation: Ohio Department of Education
- Website: www.mycommodores.org

Perry High School is a public high school located in Perry Township, just southeast of Lima, Ohio, United States. It is the only high school in the Perry Local School District and serves students in grades seven through twelve. Athletic teams are known as the Commodores and the school colors are red and white. PHS competes in the Ohio High School Athletic Association as a member of the Northwest Central Conference.
