= Crestview High School (Convoy, Ohio) =

Location
- 531 East Tully Street; Convoy, Ohio 45832; United States; 40°54′58″N 84°42′05″W

Information
- Type: Public
- School district: Crestview Local School District
- NCES School ID: 390503503919
- Principal: Mimi Myers
- Teaching staff: 29.00 (on an FTE basis)
- Grades: 9–12
- Enrollment: 249 (2024–25)
- Student to teacher ratio: 8.59
- Colors: Blue, red, and white
- Athletics conference: Northwest Conference
- Team name: Knights
- Website: www.crestviewknights.com/schools/crestview_high_school

Crestview High School is a public high school in Convoy, Ohio, United States. It is the only high school in the Crestview Local School District and serves students in grades nine through twelve. Athletic teams are known as the Crestview Knights and the school colors are blue, red, and white. CHS competes as in the Ohio High School Athletic Association as a member of the Northwest Conference.

== Athletics ==
=== State championships ===
- Girls softball – 2005, 2012, 2016
- Boys basketball - 2014, 2019
- Boys cross Country - 2025
