= Delphos Jefferson High School =

Location
- 901 Wildcat Lane; Delphos, Ohio 45833; United States
- Coordinates: 40°51′04″N 84°21′06″W

Information
- School district: Delphos City School District
- Principal: Bryant Miller
- Faculty: 22
- Teaching staff: 17.50 (FTE)
- Grades: 9–12
- Student to teacher ratio: 15.20
- Colors: Red and white
- Athletics conference: Northwest Conference
- Team name: Wildcats
- Rival: Delphos St. John's; Spencerville
- Accreditation: Ohio Department of Education
- Website: highschool.delphoscityschools.org

Delphos Jefferson High School (DJHS), is a public high school in Delphos, Ohio, United States. It is the only high school in the Delphos City School District and serves students in grades 9–12 living in the city of Delphos and parts of neighboring Washington, Marion, and Jennings Townships. School colors are red and white and athletic teams are known as the Wildcats. DJHS competes in the Ohio High School Athletic Association (OHSAA) as a charter member of the Northwest Conference. As of the 2021–22 school year, the school had an enrollment of 295 students and a faculty of 19 teachers, for a student-teacher ratio of 15.53.

== State championships ==
- Baseball - 1931

== See also ==
- List of high schools in Ohio
