= Leipsic High School =

Location
- 232 Oak St. Leipsic, Putnam County, Ohio 45856; United States; 41°05′58″N 83°59′26″W

Information
- Type: Public, Coeducational high school
- Superintendent: Keith Baumgartner
- NCES School ID: 390493503568
- Principal: Shannon Forsbach
- Teaching staff: 26.11 (FTE)
- Grades: 6-12
- Enrollment: 368 (2023–2024)
- Student to teacher ratio: 14.09
- Color
- Athletics conference: Putnam County League; Blanchard Valley Conference
- Mascot: Vikings
- Nickname: Vikings
- Athletic Director: Brent Newell
- Website: llsdk12.org

Leipsic High School is a public high school in Leipsic, Ohio. It is the only high school in the Leipsic Local Schools district. The district provides education to students in the following townships within Putnam County: most of Van Buren, parts of Liberty and Palmer, and small sections of Blanchard and Ottawa. Municipalities in the district include Leipsic, Belmore, and West Leipsic.

The mascot for Leipsic High School is the Vikings. It is similar in appearance to the Minnesota Vikings of the National Football League. Leipsic Vikings school colors are gold, purple, and white.

== Ohio High School Athletic Association State Championships ==
- Boys Baseball – 1976

== Notable alumni ==
- Keith Cupp, former NFL football player
- Liam Nadler, football player
