= Paulding High School =

Location
- 405 N Water St; Paulding, Ohio 45879; United States
- Coordinates: 41°08′28″N 84°34′38″W

Information
- Type: Public
- School district: Paulding Exempted Village Schools
- Principal: Chris Etzler
- Teaching staff: 19.35 (FTE)
- Grades: 9 - 12
- Enrollment: 343 (2023-2024)
- Student to teacher ratio: 17.73
- Colors: Maroon and white
- Athletics conference: Green Meadows Conference
- Mascot: Panther
- Website: phs.pauldingschools.org

Paulding High School is a public high school in Paulding, Ohio. It is the only high school in the Paulding Exempted Village Schools district. It is Paulding's second high school.

== Athletics ==
=== Ohio High School Athletic Association State Championships ===
- Boys Track & Field - 1960
