= Lincolnview Junior/Senior High School =

Location
- 15945 Middle Point Road; Van Wert, Ohio 45891; United States; 40°51′12″N 84°30′59″W

Information
- Type: Public, Coeducational
- School district: Lincolnview Local School District
- Principal: Brad Mendenballs
- Grades: 7–12
- Enrollment: 362 (2023–2024)
- Colors: Blue and gold
- Athletics conference: Northwest Conference
- Team name: Lancers
- Website: www.lincolnview.k12.oh.us

Lincolnview K-12 is a public elementary and senior high school near Van Wert, Ohio, United States. It is the only K-12 School in the Lincolnview Local School District. There are currently around 400 students enrolled in grades 7–12.

== Athletics ==
Lincolnview is a member of the Northwest Conference (OHSAA). Lincolnview fields six varsity boys sports and five varsity girls sports. In addition, Lincolnview fields an indoor track and bowling team, but only as club sports.

=== State championships ===
- Baseball - 1962
- Boys Basketball - 1997
