= Allen East High School =

Public high school in Ohio, United States

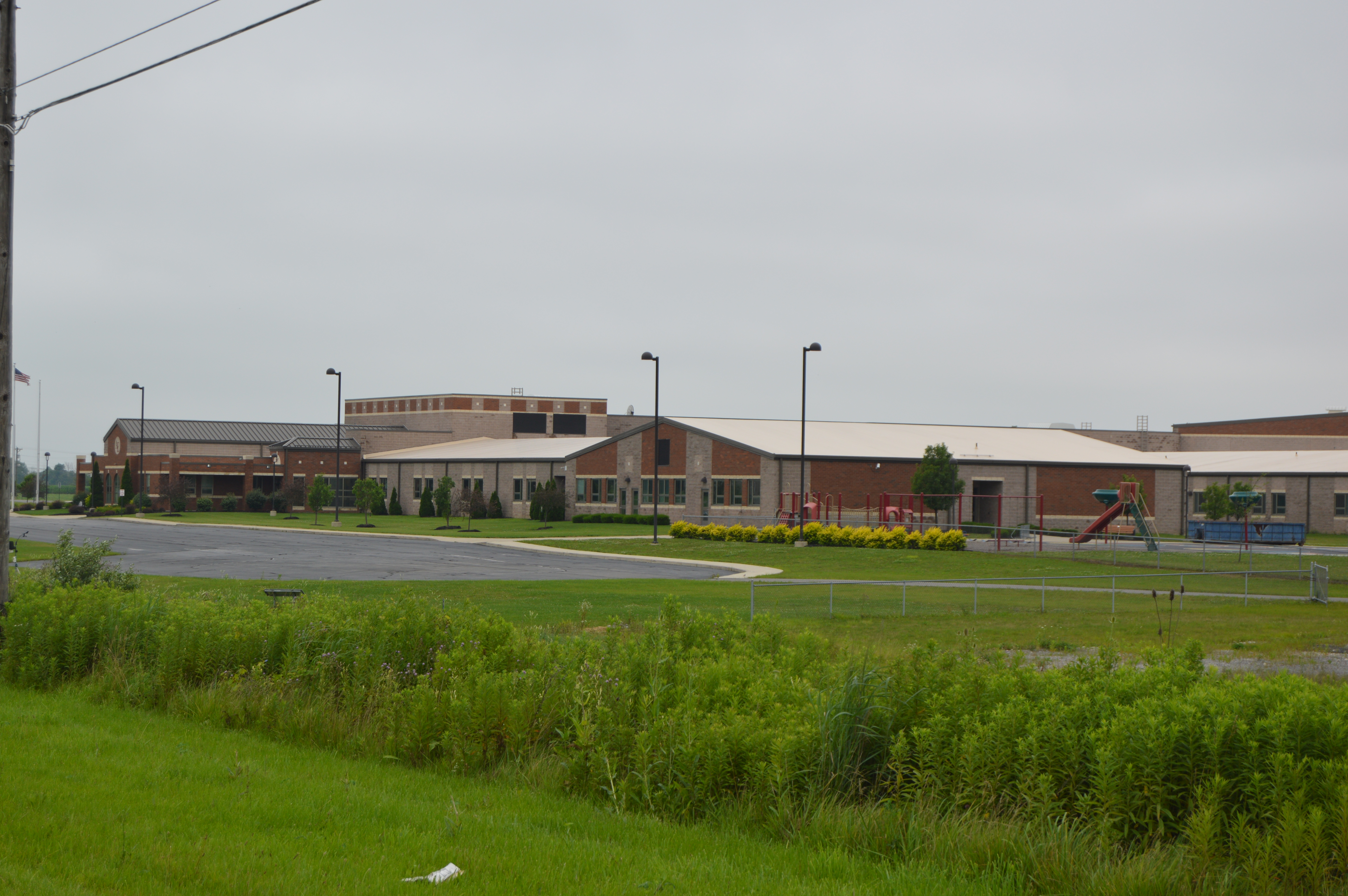
- Front, seen from State Route 309

Location
- 9105 Harding Highway; Harrod, (Allen County), Ohio 45850; United States; 40°44′2″N 83°55′56″W

Information
- Superintendent: Mel Rentschler
- Principal: Jeff Amspoker
- Teaching staff: 18.00 (FTE)
- Grades: 9–12
- Student to teacher ratio: 14.33
- Colors: Royal blue and white
- Athletics conference: Northwest Conference
- Team name: Mustangs
- Website: alleneastschools.org

Allen East High School is a four-year high school in Allen County, Ohio, U.S.. It was formed in the autumn of 1965 with the consolidation of the two eastern Allen County School Districts: Lafayette-Jackson and Auglaize-Local. The school was recognized with a Bronze Medal as one of the top schools in the nation by U.S. News & World Report in 2010. It is the only high school in Allen County and the greater Lima/Allen County region to be recognized by the publication.

As with many schools in Northwestern Ohio, Allen East constructed new school facilities to accommodate its growing population. Its outdated facilities, such as the former high school (constructed in 1931 as Lafayette High School), has been torn down. The new school re-opened for the 2007–2008 school year.

== Organizations ==
=== 'MUSTANG' Marching Brass ===
The 'MUSTANG' Marching Brass, Allen East's all brass marching band, is well known throughout the state of Ohio for its unique marching and dancing style. With over 150 band members from a high school of less than 400 students, The "Brass" is regularly the largest student group out of Allen East High School and is one of the largest bands in Northwest Ohio.

The Brass has performed at The Peach Bowl in Atlanta, Georgia 4 times, Cleveland Browns and Cincinnati Bengals games, as the featured band at various parades and festivals, and hosts their own annual marching band invitational every September. Notable accolades include being crowned Peach Bowl Grand Champions in 2006 and winning the Allen County Fair Parade 1st Place Trophy nearly 20 times in 25 years. The Mustang Marching Brass travelled to Memphis and Nashville to perform at Graceland Mansion during the 2017–2018 school year.

On October 3, 2009, the 'MUSTANG' Marching Brass performed at the Ohio State University "Shoe" during the Buckeye Invitational and received a standing ovation. During this festival, only two bands received a standing ovation. The other band was Ohio State.

In 2018, the 'MUSTANG' Marching Brass traveled to Nashville and Memphis, Tennessee to perform their 'Elvis Presley' show at his home in Graceland.

== Mascot ==
=== The Story of the Mascot ===
The 'mustang' was selected as the mascot in 1965 by the students of the newly consolidated district. The choice coincides with the unveiling of Ford Motor Company's sports car of the same name, which was released just one year prior. However, the Allen East Mustang is the Mustang horse, even though surrounding schools were a little confused.

== Athletics ==
Allen East is a member of the Northwest Conference (NWC) in all sports.

=== Ohio High School Athletic Association State Championships ===
- Boys Cross Country – 1981

=== Northwest Conference Championships ===
- Baseball: 1991, 1975, 1974, 1969
- Boys Basketball: 1972,1970,1968
- Girls Basketball:1995
- American football: 2022, 2019, 1995, 1990, 1989, 1982, 1972, 1968, 1967
- Golf: 2021, 2020, 2013, 2000, 1992, 1990, 1986, 1984
- Boys Track: 1999, 1998
- Girls Track: 1995, 1992
- Volleyball: 1994
- Wrestling: 2019, 2018, 2017, 2011, 2010, 2009, 2008, 2006
