= Ada High School (Ohio) =

Public high school in Ada, Ohio, United States

Location
- 725 West North Street; Rural; Ada, Ohio, (Hardin County) 45810; United States
- Coordinates: 40°46′28″N 83°49′50″W

Information
- Type: Public, Coeducational high school
- Motto: Aspiring to excel in all areas of the school experience.
- School district: Ada Exempted Village Schools
- Superintendent: Robin VanBuskirk
- Principal: Dan Lee
- Grades: 7-12
- Enrollment: 396 (2023–2024)
- Colors: Purple & Gold
- Fight song: Fight on to victory
- Athletics conference: Blanchard Valley Conference
- Sports: Football, soccer, volleyball, cross country, golf, cheerleading, basketball, swim, wrestling, baseball, softball, track & field, tennis
- Mascot: Bulldog
- Team name: Bulldogs
- Accreditation: North Central Association of Colleges and Schools
- Website: ada.k12.oh.us

Ada High School is a public high school located in Ada, Ohio. It is the only high school in the Ada Exempted Village School District.

The District spends $7,419 per pupil in current expenditures. The district spends 63% on instruction, 32% on support services, and 4% on other elementary and secondary expenditures.

It has 16 students for every full-time equivalent teacher, with the OH state average being 19 students per full-time equivalent teacher. 13% of students have an Individualized Education Program (IEP). An IEP is a written plan for students eligible for special needs services.

== Ohio High School Athletic Association state championships ==
- Girls Basketball – 1978

== Notable alumni ==
- Zac Dysert, NFL player
- Lee Tressel, College Football Hall of Fame
