= Midland Athletic League =

The Midland Athletic League was an OHSAA athletic league located in northwest Ohio that was formed in 1985. Mark King was the last commissioner. The league folded following the 2013–14 school year as its members found new league homes. The last day of league operation was June 30, 2014.

== Members ==
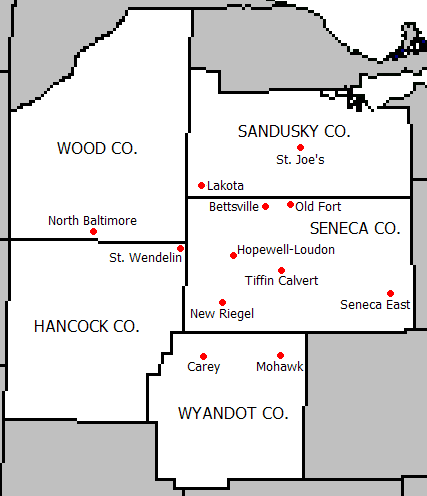
The member schools of the Midland Athletic League when it folded in June 2014.

School	Nickname	Location	Colors	New League for 2014–15	Current Status (2025)
Bettsville	Bobcats	Bettsville	Black, Orange	None, consolidated with Old Fort	District absorbed by Old Fort in 2014
Calvert	Senecas	Tiffin	Royal Blue, White	Toledo Area Athletic Conference	SBC River Division
Carey	Blue Devils	Carey	Blue, White	Northern 10 Athletic Conference	N10
Hopewell-Loudon	Chieftains	Bascom	Scarlet, Gray	Blanchard Valley Conference	SBC River Division
Lakota	Raiders	Kansas	Navy Blue, White	Sandusky River League	SBC River Division
Mohawk	Warriors	Sycamore	Red, Black	Northern 10 Athletic Conference	N10
New Riegel	Blue Jackets	New Riegel	Navy Blue, Vegas Gold	Sandusky River League	SBC River Division
North Baltimore	Fighting Tigers	North Baltimore	Orange, Black	Blanchard Valley Conference	Northwest Central Conference
Old Fort	Stockaders	Old Fort	Brown, Gold	Sandusky River League	SBC River Division
St. Joseph (St. Joe's)	Crimson Streaks	Fremont	Crimson, Gray	Sandusky River League	SBC River Division
St. Wendelin	Mohawks	Fostoria	Black, Gold	Sandusky River League	Closed in June 2017
Seneca East	Tigers	Attica	Orange, Black	Northern 10 Athletic Conference	N10

Bettsville, New Riegel and Old Fort never fielded football teams for league play. St. Wendelin's football team competed in the MAL from 1986 to 2008, then in the Northwest Central Conference for 2009 and 2010. St. Wendelin spent 2011–2013 as a football independent, but since it remained a member of the MAL for every other sport, the MAL kept track of St. Wendelin's football record in the league standings.

== League history ==
=== 1980s ===
- The MAL was created for the 1985–86 school year's basketball season with Bettsville, Hopewell-Loudon, New Riegel, Old Fort and Seneca East coming from the crumbling Seneca County League to combine with North Baltimore and St. Wendelin from the former Lakeshore Conference. Hopewell-Loudon and Seneca East were also full members of the Lakeshore Conference. Tiffin Calvert and St. Joseph agreed to join the league, but were not able to leave the Sandusky Bay Conference until the 1985–86 school year ended.

=== 1990s ===
- Carey and Mohawk leave the North Central Conference and join the MAL for the 1990–91 school year.

=== 2000s ===
- Lakota left the Suburban Lakes League at the end of the 2008–09 school year to join the MAL in all sports in time for the 2009 fall sports season.
- St. Wendelin competed in the Northwest Central Conference for football only in 2009 and 2010, but remained a member of the MAL for all other sports. They were eventually voted out of the NWCC for canceling 3 football games in 2010 and competed in the Christian Athletic League of America out of Michigan for football in 2012 and 2013.
- On September 8 of 2009, the MAL voted against adding SLL schools Elmwood and Gibsonburg after both submitted letters of interest for membership.

=== 2010s ===
- On December 1, 2011, Carey, Mohawk, and Seneca East announced they would leave the MAL to help form the new Northern 10 Athletic Conference in 2014 with Bucyrus, Buckeye Central, Colonel Crawford, Crestline, Riverdale, Wynford and Ridgedale.
- On April 19, 2012, Calvert, Hopewell-Loudon, and North Baltimore also announced they would leave the MAL to join the Blanchard Valley Conference after answering a letter of interest made by the BVC in February 2012. Leaving only two football-playing schools (Lakota and St. Joseph CC) it appeared likely that the MAL would not sponsor the sport anymore.
- On May 21, 2012, Hopewell-Loudon and North Baltimore were invited to join the BVC for 2014–15, with responses expected by July 1, 2012. North Baltimore accepted on June 19, 2012 while Hopewell-Loudon accepted a day later. Hopewell-Loudon considered a proposal that would make them dual-members of both the MAL and the BVC for every sport except football.
- In July 2012, Lakota sent a letter of inquiry to the TAAC about potential membership.
- In December 2012, North Baltimore decided to participate in both the MAL and BVC for all sports except football, which would have been BVC-only. This depended on what setup the MAL would have had in the future.
- On February 1, 2013, St. Mary Central Catholic High School in Sandusky announced they would be forming a new league called the Sandusky River League in 2014–15 with Calvert, Lakota, New Riegel, Old Fort, and St. Joe's. This league's intention was to have eight football-playing members and 2-3 non-football schools. This league would ultimately give a home to the remaining MAL football schools along with New Riegel and Old Fort for all other sports. Bettsville and St. Wendelin were not initially added to the SRL, but were extended invitations and encouraged to apply.
- On March 19, 2013, St. Wendelin was accepted to join the Sandusky River League as its seventh member for 2014.
- On April 4, 2013, it was confirmed that Bettsville would not be admitted to the SRL and would have competed as an independent following the MAL's demise. In early 2014, Bettsville opted to let Old Fort absorb its district prior to the 2014–15 school year in order to save its district from financial issues.
- On May 13, 2013, Tiffin Calvert was unanimously voted in as the 11th member of the TAAC for 2014. They will join the TAAC without actually competing in the SRL.
- As the last calendar day for the 2013–14 school year, June 30, 2014, was the last day the MAL existed as a league.

== Boys championships ==
Year	Football	Cross Country	Golf	Basketball	Wrestling	Baseball	Track & Field	Tennis
1985–86	N/A	N/A	N/A	Old Fort	St. Joseph	New Riegel, Old Fort, St. Joseph	Seneca East	
1986–87	Calvert, St. Wendelin	Bettsville	Calvert	New Riegel	St. Joseph	St. Joseph	Seneca East	
1987–88	St. Joseph, St. Wendelin, Seneca East	St. Joseph	St. Joseph	New Riegel	St. Joseph	St. Joseph	Seneca East	
1988–89	St. Joseph	St. Joseph	Old Fort	Calvert	Seneca East	North Baltimore, St. Joseph	Seneca East	
1989–90	St. Joseph	Seneca East	Old Fort	North Baltimore	St. Joseph	North Baltimore	Seneca East	
1990–91	St. Joseph	Seneca East	St. Joseph	Carey	Carey	North Baltimore	Seneca East	
1991–92	St. Joseph, St. Wendelin	Seneca East	St. Joseph	St. Wendelin	Carey	New Riegel	Seneca East	
1992–93	St. Joseph, Carey, Seneca East	Hopewell-Loudon	St. Joseph	New Riegel, St. Joseph	St. Joseph	Hopewell-Loudon, Mohawk	Seneca East	
1993–94	Carey	Old Fort	Bettsville	Carey, Old Fort	St. Joseph	Mohawk	St. Joseph	
1994–95	Carey	Seneca East	St. Joseph	Old Fort	Carey	St. Joseph	Seneca East	
1995–96	North Baltimore	Seneca East	Bettsville	New Riegel, Old Fort	Mohawk	New Riegel, St. Joseph	Seneca East	
1996–97	St. Joseph	Seneca East	St. Joseph	Old Fort	Mohawk	St. Wendelin	St. Wendelin	
1997–98	Mohawk	Seneca East	New Riegel	New Riegel	Mohawk	Seneca East	Seneca East	
1998–99	Calvert	St. Wendelin	St. Joseph	Calvert	Mohawk	St. Wendelin	St. Wendelin	
1999–00	Calvert	St. Wendelin	St. Joseph	Calvert	Mohawk	Seneca East	St. Wendelin	
2000–01	Calvert, Carey	St. Joseph	North Baltimore	Calvert, Mohawk, St. Joseph	Mohawk	Carey, New Riegel	Seneca East	
2001–02	Mohawk	St. Joseph	St. Joseph	Old Fort	Mohawk	St. Joseph	Seneca East	
2002–03	Calvert, Mohawk	Old Fort	St. Joseph	Calvert	St. Joseph	Mohawk	Seneca East	
2003–04	Hopewell-Loudon, Carey, Mohawk (See Notes section)	Old Fort	St. Joseph	Calvert	Mohawk	Calvert, Mohawk, St. Joseph	Old Fort	
2004–05	Hopewell-Loudon	Old Fort	St. Joseph	Calvert	Mohawk	St. Joseph	Seneca East	
2005–06	Hopewell-Loudon	Old Fort	St. Joseph	New Riegel	Mohawk	Calvert, Mohawk	Hopewell-Loudon	
2006–07	Mohawk	Old Fort	St. Joseph	Carey, Mohawk, Seneca East	Calvert	Mohawk	Hopewell-Loudon	
2007–08	Hopewell-Loudon	Hopewell-Loudon	St. Joseph	Calvert	Calvert	Hopewell-Loudon, Mohawk, St. Joseph	Mohawk	
2008–09	Hopewell-Loudon	Old Fort	St. Joseph	Carey	Calvert	Seneca East	Seneca East	
2009–10	Carey, St. Joseph	Calvert	Calvert	New Riegel	Calvert	Hopewell-Loudon	Seneca East	
2010–11	Mohawk	New Riegel	St. Joseph	Calvert, New Riegel	Carey	New Riegel	Seneca East	
2011–12	Hopewell-Loudon	Seneca East	St. Joseph	New Riegel	Carey	Hopewell-Loudon	Seneca East	
2012–13	St. Joseph	Seneca East	St. Joseph	New Riegel, Old Fort, St. Joseph	Carey	North Baltimore	Seneca East	
2013–14	Calvert, Carey	Seneca East	Hopewell-Loudon	Old Fort	Carey			

== Girls championships ==
Year	Volleyball	Cross Country	Tennis	Basketball	Softball	Track & Field
1985–86	-	-	NA	St. Wendelin/New Riegel	St. Wendelin	Seneca East
1986–87	Hopewell-Loudon	St. Joseph	NA	New Riegel/St. Joseph	Calvert	St. Joseph
1987–88	Hopewell-Loudon	St. Joseph	NA	St. Joseph	Calvert	St. Joseph/Seneca East
1988–89	Hopewell-Loudon	St. Joseph	NA	St. Joseph	Calvert/St. Wendelin	North Baltimore
1989–90	Hopewell-Loudon	St. Wendelin	NA	New Riegel/North Baltimore	Calvert	Seneca East
1990–91	New Riegel	St. Wendelin	NA	New Riegel	Calvert	Seneca East
1991–92	Hopewell-Loudon	Seneca East	NA	New Riegel	Calvert/Mohawk/Seneca East	Seneca East
1992–93	Calvert	Seneca East	NA	New Riegel	Mohawk	Seneca East
1993–94	Hopewell-Loudon	St. Joseph	NA	New Riegel	Mohawk	Seneca East
1994–95	Hopewell-Loudon	Seneca East	NA	New Riegel	Mohawk/Old Fort	Seneca East
1995–96	Hopewell-Loudon	Seneca East	NA	Hopewell-Loudon	Mohawk	Seneca East
1996–97	Hopewell-Loudon	Seneca East	NA	Hopewell-Loudon	Old Fort	Seneca East
1997–98	Hopewell-Loudon	Seneca East	NA	Hopewell-Loudon	Old Fort	Seneca East
1998–99	Hopewell-Loudon	Seneca East	NA	Hopewell-Loudon	Hopewell-Loudon/Old Fort	Seneca East
1999–00	Hopewell-Loudon	Seneca East	NA	Hopewell-Loudon	Old Fort	St. Joseph
2000–01	Hopewell-Loudon	Seneca East	NA	St. Joseph	Old Fort	Calvert
2001–02	Hopewell-Loudon	Seneca East	NA	New Riegel	Mohawk	Carey
2002–03	Old Fort	Hopewell-Loudon	NA	Calvert	Mohawk	Carey
2003–04	Old Fort	Hopewell-Loudon	NA	New Riegel/St. Joseph	Mohawk	Carey
2004–05	Mohawk	Old Fort	NA	New Riegel/St. Joseph	Mohawk	Carey
2005–06	Old Fort	Seneca East	NA	Calvert/Hopewell-Loudon	Mohawk	Carey
2006–07	Old Fort	Mohawk	NA	Hopewell-Loudon	Mohawk	Carey
2007–08	Hopewell-Loudon	Seneca East	NA	St. Wendelin	St. Wendelin/Carey	Carey
2008–09	Hopewell-Loudon	Seneca East	NA	Carey	Mohawk	Seneca East
2009–10	Hopewell-Loudon	Seneca East	NA	New Riegel	New Riegel	St. Joseph
2010–11	Lakota/Hopewell-Loudon	Seneca East	NA	Carey, Mohawk	Lakota	Seneca East
2011–12	New Riegel	Hopewell-Loudon	NA	New Riegel	New Riegel/Lakota	St. Joseph
2012–13	Mohawk	Hopewell-Loudon	NA	Carey	St. Joseph	Carey
2013–14	New Riegel	Mohawk	NA	Carey		

== See also ==
Ohio High School Athletic Conferences

== Notes ==
- St. Wendelin canceled its final two football games of the 2003 season, with Carey and Mohawk, due to low numbers and injuries. Hopewell-Loudon's league record was 6–1, while both Carey and Mohawk wound up 5–1 in the MAL. Since neither Carey nor Mohawk had yet played St. Wendelin but each had just one league loss at the end of the season, league officials decided they and Hopewell-Loudon would share the MAL title.
