= Northern Ohio Conference =

American high school athletic conference

The Northern Ohio Conference is an upcoming Ohio High School Athletic Association high school athletic conference in north central Ohio that is set to begin play in the 2026–2027 school year. All ten of its inaugural members are coming over from the Lake and Bay divisions of the Sandusky Bay Conference.

== Members ==
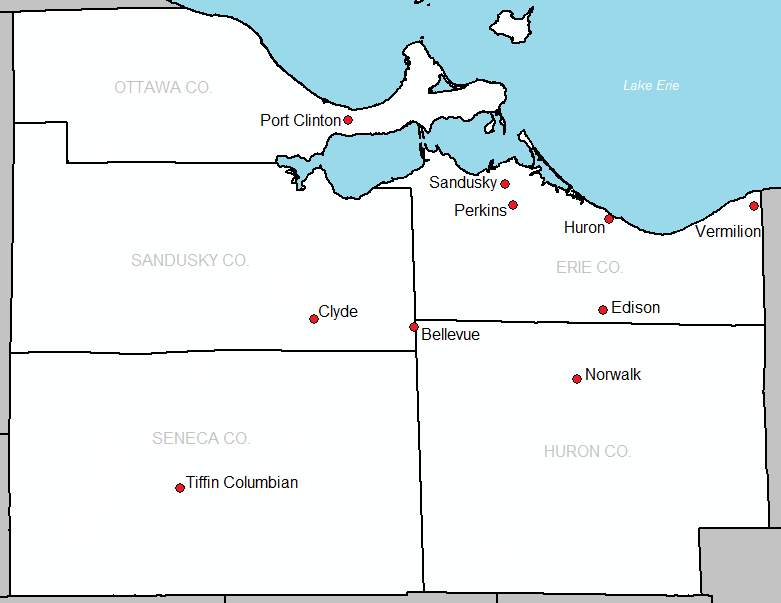
The inaugural members of the Northern Ohio Conference for 2026-2027.

School	Nickname	Location	Colors	Tenure
Lake Division
Clyde	Fliers	Clyde	Blue, gold	2026–
Columbian	Tornadoes	Tiffin	Blue, gold	2026–
Norwalk	Truckers	Norwalk	Blue, gold	2026–
Perkins	Pirates	Perkins Township	Black, white	2026–
Sandusky	Blue Streaks	Sandusky	Blue, white	2026–
Bay Division
Bellevue	Redmen	Bellevue	Red, white	2026–
Edison	Chargers	Milan	Blue, orange	2026–
Huron	Tigers	Huron	Red, gray	2026–
Port Clinton	Redskins	Port Clinton	Red, white	2026–
Vermilion	Sailors	Vermilion	Purple, vegas gold	2026–

== History ==
In January 2025, reports circulated that ten school boards of the Lake and Bay division schools of the Sandusky Bay Conference were considering withdrawing from the SBC to form a new league. Sandusky's school board was the first to approve the move on February 11. School administrators cited difficulty in making changes due to a voting bloc of the River division schools (13 votes to 10) as one reason for the move. On May 7, these schools announced they would begin play in the 2026–2027 school year as the Northern Ohio Conference: Bellevue, Clyde, Edison, Huron, Norwalk, Perkins, Port Clinton, Sandusky, Tiffin Columbian, and Vermilion.

The NOC will carry over the Lake and Bay Divisions for most sports but will not have divisions for sports such as soccer and swimming. The Lake Division will include Clyde, Norwalk, Perkins, Sandusky, and Tiffin Columbian, while the Bay Division will have Bellevue, Edison, Huron, Port Clinton, and Vermilion. The new league will support 21 varsity sports while Port Clinton's athletic director Rick Dominick will be the new league's executive secretary and treasurer.

The Northern Ohio Conference was announced shortly after five other schools in the SBC's River Division declared they were leaving as well. Hopewell-Loudon, New Riegel, Old Fort, Tiffin Calvert, and Willard joined the Northern 10 Athletic Conference along with Lucas for the 2026–2027 school year. This dropped the SBC from 23 members down to eight: Danbury, Gibsonburg, Lakota, Margaretta, Northwood, St. Joseph CC, St. Mary CC, and Woodmore will carry on under the Sandusky Bay Conference banner with Ottawa Hills joining the group in 2026-2027 and Toledo Christian coming aboard as a football-only member in 2027.

== See also ==
- Ohio high school athletic conferences
