= Sandusky Bay Conference =

High school athletic conference in Ohio, USA

The Sandusky Bay Conference is a high school athletic conference in the Sandusky Bay area of north central Ohio. It is affiliated with the Ohio High School Athletic Association.

== Members ==
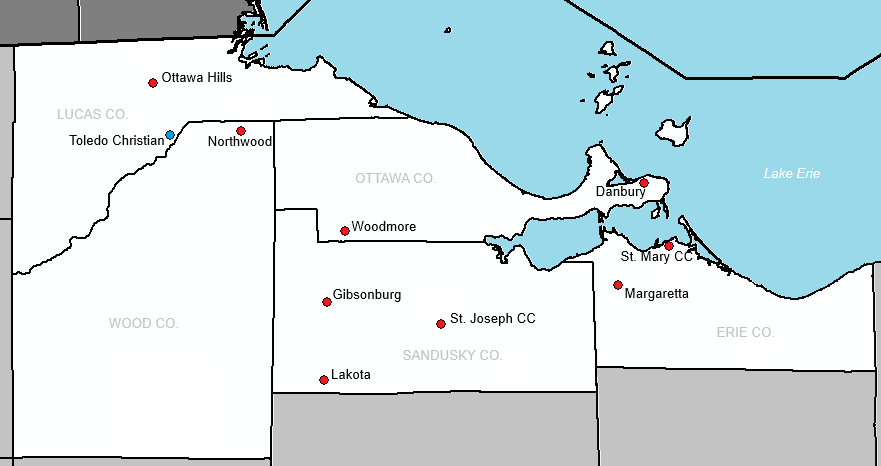
Map of the Sandusky Bay Conference members for the 2026-2027 school year. Current members are in red, future football-only members are in blue.

=== Current members ===
School	Nickname	Location	Enrollment (CB/FB 2024)	State Region (FB 2024)	Colors	Tenure					
School	Nickname	Location	Enrollment (CB/FB 2024)	State Region (FB 2024)	Colors	Tenure	Danbury	Lakers	Lakeside	Blue, White	1948-1957, 2018-
Gibsonburg	Golden Bears	Gibsonburg	93	7:26	Orange, Black	1948-1959, 1963-1972, 2018-					
Lakota	Raiders	Kansas	142	6:22	Navy Blue, White	1960-1972, 2016-					
Margaretta	Polar Bears	Castalia	151	6:22	Green, White	1963-					
Northwood	Rangers	Northwood	174	5:18	Blue, Gold	2025-					
Ottawa Hills	Green Bears	Ottawa Hills	144	6:22	Green, White	2026-					
St. Joseph (SJCC)	Crimson Streaks	Fremont			Crimson, Gray	1948-1986, 2016-					
St. Mary (SMCC)	Panthers	Sandusky			Navy Blue, Vegas Gold	1950-2014, 2016-					
Woodmore	Wildcats	Elmore	115	6:22	Navy, Gold	2023-					

=== Future members ===
School	Nickname	Location	Enrollment (CB/FB 2024)	State Region (FB 2024)	Colors	Tenure					
School	Nickname	Location	Enrollment (CB/FB 2024)	State Region (FB 2024)	Colors	Tenure	Toledo Christian	Eagles	Toledo	Blue, Gold	2027- football only

=== Former members ===
Former members who returned to the SBC with the 2016 and 2018 expansions are outlined in those sections.

School	Nickname	Location	Colors	Tenure	Left for
Bellevue	Redmen	Bellevue	Red, white	2017-2026	Northern Ohio Conference
Calvert	Senecas	Tiffin	Royal blue, white	1958-1966, 1972-1986, 2016–2026	Northern 10 Athletic Conference
Carey	Blue Devils	Carey	Blue, White	1958-1963	North Central Conference
Clyde	Fliers	Clyde	Blue, gold	1949-2026	Northern Ohio Conference
Columbian	Tornadoes	Tiffin	Blue, gold	2017-2026	Northern Ohio Conference
Edison	Chargers	Milan	Blue, orange	1986-2026	Northern Ohio Conference
Elmore	Bulldogs	Elmore	Black, Gold, White	1948-1958	Seaway Conference
Genoa	Comets	Genoa	Maroon, Gray	1948-1956	Northern Lakes League
Hopewell-Loudon	Chieftains	Bascom	Scarlet, gray	2019-2026	Northern 10 Athletic Conference
Huron	Tigers	Huron	Red, gray	1968-2026	Northern Ohio Conference
Mohawk	Warriors	Sycamore	Red, Black	1960-1962	North Central Conference
New Riegel	Blue Jackets	New Riegel	Navy blue, vegas gold	2016-2026	Northern 10 Athletic Conference
Norwalk	Truckers	Norwalk	Blue, gold	2017-2026	Northern Ohio Conference
Oak Harbor	Rockets	Oak Harbor	Green, Red, White	1948-1972, 1986-2023	Suburban Lakes League, Northern Buckeye Conference
Old Fort	Stockaders	Old Fort	Brown, gold	2016-2026	Northern 10 Athletic Conference
Perkins	Pirates	Perkins Township	Black, white	1972-2026	Northern Ohio Conference
Port Clinton	Redskins	Port Clinton	Red, white	1948-1949, 1980-2026	Northern Ohio Conference
Sandusky	Blue Streaks	Sandusky	Blue, white	2017-2026	Northern Ohio Conference
St. Wendelin	Mohawks	Fostoria	Black, Gold	1968-1972, 2016-2017	Lakeshore Conference; Closed in 2017
Shelby	Whippets	Shelby	Red, Gray	2017-2018 (football only, Fall 2018)	Mid-Ohio Athletic Conference
Vermilion	Sailors	Vermilion	Purple, vegas gold	2016-2026	Northern Ohio Conference
Willard	Crimson Flashes	Willard	Crimson, white	2017-2026	Northern 10 Athletic Conference

== Athletic competition ==
The conference was established in 1948 and offers competition in the following sports:

- baseball; boys
- bowling; boys & girls
- cross-country; boys & girls
- basketball; boys & girls
- cheerleading; boys & girls
- football; boys
- golf; boys & girls
- soccer; boys & girls
- softball; girls
- swimming; boys & girls
- diving; boys & girls
- tennis; boys & girls
- track & field; boys & girls
- volleyball; girls
- wrestling; boys

== League history ==
=== 1940s ===
- 1948: The SBC is formed with inaugural members Danbury, Elmore, Genoa, Gibsonburg, Oak Harbor, Port Clinton, and Fremont St. Joseph CC.
- 1949: Port Clinton leaves and is replaced by Clyde.

=== 1950s ===
- 1950: Sandusky St. Mary CC joins.
- 1956: Genoa leaves to help form the Northern Lakes League.
- 1957: Danbury leaves.
- 1958: Elmore leaves and is replaced by Tiffin Calvert and Carey.
- 1959: Gibsonburg leaves.

=== 1960s ===
- 1960: Lakota and Mohawk join.
- 1963: Carey leaves and is replaced by Margaretta and Gibsonburg, who rejoins after a four-year absence.
- 1966: Tiffin Calvert leaves.
- 1968: Huron and Fostoria St. Wendelin join.

=== 1970s ===
- 1972: Gibsonburg, Lakota and Oak Harbor leave to form the Suburban Lakes League. St. Wendelin also leaves the league. They are replaced by Sandusky Perkins and Tiffin Calvert, who rejoins the league.

=== 1980s ===
- 1980: Port Clinton leaves the Great Lakes League and rejoins after a 31-year absence.
- 1986: St. Joseph CC and Tiffin Calvert leave to help form the Midland Athletic League. They are replaced by Edison, who left the Firelands Conference, and by Oak Harbor, who returns from the SLL.

=== 2010s ===
- 2013: On February 1, St. Mary CC announced they would be forming a new league called the Sandusky River League in 2014-15 with Calvert (who instead joined the Toledo Area Athletic Conference or TAAC), Lakota, New Riegel, Old Fort, and St. Joseph CC. St. Wendelin would join them later. This league's intent was to have 8 football-playing members and 2-3 non-football schools. This league will ultimately give a home to the remaining MAL schools.
- 2014: On December 10, the SBC announced plans to expand. Invitations were accepted by Lakota, New Riegel, Old Fort, Fremont St. Joseph Central Catholic, Sandusky St. Mary Central Catholic, and Fostoria St. Wendelin Catholic (all of which now play in the Sandusky River League), Tiffin Calvert, a former member of the SBC now a member of the TAAC, and Vermilion, currently a member of the West Shore Conference.
- 2016: On March 16, Clyde principal William J. Webb and the Northern Ohio League announced that the NOL will merge into the SBC for the 2017-18 school year. Bellevue, Norwalk, Sandusky, Shelby, Tiffin Columbian, and Willard will become the league's newest members.
- 2017: Both Gibsonburg and Danbury announced that they would leave the TAAC and return to the SBC for the 2018-2019 school year. In April 2017, St. Wendelin announced that it would close in June following the 2016-2017 school year.
- 2017: North Union announced in July they would be leaving the Mid-Ohio Athletic Conference to join the Central Buckeye Conference. This prompted the MOAC to invite Shelby as a replacement, which they accepted. The Whippets would spend only one year in the SBC.
- 2019: In August 2017 Hopewell-Loudon announced that they would leave the Blanchard Valley Conference for the Sandusky Bay Conference in the 2019-2020 school year after being offered an invitation to replace Shelby.

=== 2020s ===
- 2021: On May 20 the school board at Woodmore announced they were going to accept the Sandusky Bay Conference's invitation to join their league for the 2023–24 school year. It is speculated that Woodmore will play in the SBC's River Division with schools of similar enrollment size.
  - The school board at Oak Harbor announced on May 26 they would be leaving the SBC and accepting the Northern Buckeye Conference's invitation to replace Woodmore.
  - St. Mary CC announced on July 19 that they would be playing football in the Northern 8 Football Conference for the 2021 and 2022 seasons, with the intention to return to 11-man football at some point.
- 2023: On October 20, St. Joseph Central Catholic announced they would play 8-man football in the Northern 8 Football Conference beginning in 2024. They join fellow SBC members Danbury and St. Mary CC in the 8-man circuit.
- 2024: In January, Northwood and the SBC announced that the Rangers would be joining the River Division for the 2025–26 school year. Northwood had been a member of the Toledo Area Athletic Conference since 2000. The SBC River will then be split into a North Division (Danbury, Gibsonburg, Northwood, SJCC, SMCC, and Woodmore) and a South Division (Calvert, Hopewell-Loudon, Lakota, New Riegel, and Old Fort).

=== Conference split ===
On February 11, 2025, it was reported that the school boards at ten of the Lake and Bay division schools (Clyde, Columbian, Norwalk, Perkins, and Sandusky of the Lake along with Bay members Bellevue, Edison, Huron, Port Clinton, and Vermilion) were going to vote to withdraw from the SBC and begin their own league with two divisions for the convenience of scheduling. On May 7, these schools announced they would begin play in the 2026-2027 school year as the Northern Ohio Conference. The River division will retain the SBC name going forward.

=== 2025 ===
In November 2024, the Northern 10 Athletic Conference (N10) announced that they intended to expand their league from its current eight schools to 14 schools (12 football playing schools) competing in two divisional alignments. The N10 later announced on February 26, 2025 that they had invited six schools to join their league: Hopewell-Loudon, Lucas, New Riegel, Old Fort, Tiffin Calvert, and Willard. Willard and New Reigel accepted the N10's invitation to join for the 2026-2027 school year on March 12, 2025. Calvert, Hopewell-Loudon, and Old Fort were included in a statement on March 28, 2025 that they were joining New Riegel, Willard, and Lucas from the Mid-Buckeye Conference in the N10 for the 2026-2027 school year.

In March 2025, Ottawa Hills announced they would be joining the SBC in 2026-2027. Toledo Christian announced in November 2025 that they would be joining the SBC as a football-only member for the 2027 season.

== Championships ==
Year	Football	Boys basketball	Baseball	Volleyball	Girls basketball	Softball
1948-49	Port Clinton	Gibsonburg, Port Clinton, St. Joseph CC	No Champion	No Champion	No Champion	No Champion
1949-50	Oak Harbor, St. Joseph	Elmore	No Champion	No Champion	No Champion	No Champion
1950-51	Oak Harbor	St. Joseph CC	No Champion	No Champion	No Champion	No Champion
1951-52	St. Mary CC	St. Joseph CC	No Champion	No Champion	No Champion	No Champion
1952-53	St. Joseph CC	St. Mary CC	No Champion	No Champion	No Champion	No Champion
1953-54	St. Mary CC	St. Joseph CC, St. Mary CC	No Champion	No Champion	No Champion	No Champion
1954-55	Gibsonburg	St. Joseph CC	No Champion	No Champion	No Champion	No Champion
1955-56	St. Joseph, St. Mary	St. Joseph CC	No Champion	No Champion	No Champion	No Champion
1956-57	St. Joseph CC	St. Joseph CC	No Champion	No Champion	No Champion	No Champion
1957-58	St. Mary CC	St. Joseph CC	Clyde	No Champion	No Champion	No Champion
1958-59	Gibsonburg	Oak Harbor	Tiffin Calvert	No Champion	No Champion	No Champion
1959-60	St. Joe, Tiffin Calvert	St. Joseph CC	Tiffin Calvert	No Champion	No Champion	No Champion
1960-61	St. Joseph CC	St. Joseph CC	Tiffin Calvert	No Champion	No Champion	No Champion
1961-62	Tiffin Calvert	Mohawk	St. Joseph CC, Tiffin Calvert	No Champion	No Champion	No Champion
1962-63	St. Joseph CC	Clyde	St. Joseph CC	No Champion	No Champion	No Champion
1963-64	St. Joseph CC	St. Joseph CC	Clyde	No Champion	No Champion	No Champion
1964-65	St. Joseph CC	Margaretta	Tiffin Calvert	No Champion	No Champion	No Champion
1965-66	Tiffin Calvert	St. Mary CC	Gibsonburg, St. Mary CC	No Champion	No Champion	No Champion
1966-67	St. Mary CC	Gibsonburg, Port Clinton, St. Joseph	St. Mary CC	No Champion	No Champion	No Champion
1967-68	St. Joseph CC		Clyde	No Champion	No Champion	No Champion
1968-69	St. Mary CC	St. Mary CC	Clyde, St. Mary CC	No Champion	No Champion	No Champion
1969-70	Huron	St. Mary CC	Margaretta	No Champion	No Champion	No Champion
1970-71	Huron	St. Joseph CC	Gibsonburg	No Champion	No Champion	No Champion
1971-72	St. Joseph CC	Huron	Gibsonburg, Huron	No Champion	No Champion	No Champion
1972-73	Clyde	Huron	St. Joseph CC	No Champion	No Champion	No Champion
1973-74	Clyde, Huron	St. Mary CC	Margaretta, Perkins, St. Joe, St. Mary	Huron	No Champion	No Champion
1974-75	Clyde, St. Joseph CC	Tiffin Calvert	Margaretta	Huron	Perkins, St. Mary	No Champion
1975-76	Perkins	St. Mary CC	St. Mary CC	Clyde	Perkins	No Champion
1976-77	Huron	Perkins, Tiffin Calvert	Huron	Clyde	Clyde	No Champion
1977-78	Tiffin Calvert	Huron	Margaretta	Clyde	Clyde	No Champion
1978-79	Tiffin Calvert	Perkins	Clyde	Clyde	Huron	No Champion
1979-80	Tiffin Calvert	St. Mary CC	Tiffin Calvert	Tiffin Calvert	Huron	No Champion
1980-81	Huron, Tiffin Calvert	Port Clinton	St. Joseph CC	Clyde	Huron	No Champion
1981-82	Huron, Tiffin Calvert	Huron	Huron, Port Clinton, St. Mary	Clyde, Tiffin Calvert	Huron	No Champion
1982-83	Perkins	Huron	Tiffin Calvert	Clyde	Huron	Margaretta, St. Joseph
1983-84	Huron, Margaretta	Perkins	Perkins, Port Clinton, St. Mary	Clyde	Perkins, St. Mary	Margaretta
1984-85	Huron	Port Clinton	Margaretta	Clyde	Huron	Margaretta, Tiffin Calvert
1985-86	Margaretta	Port Clinton	Clyde, Margaretta, Port Clinton	Clyde, Perkins	Margaretta, Perkins	Tiffin Calvert
1986-87	Margaretta	Oak Harbor, Perkins	Huron, Port Clinton	Clyde	Margaretta	Margaretta
1987-88	Huron	Huron	St. Mary CC	Margaretta	Margaretta	Margaretta
1988-89	Perkins	Huron	Margaretta	Oak Harbor	Margaretta, Oak Harbor	Margaretta
1989-90	St. Mary CC	Huron, Port Clinton	Margaretta, St. Mary CC	Oak Harbor	Oak Harbor	Margaretta
1990-91	Oak Harbor, St. Mary CC	Port Clinton	St. Mary CC	Clyde	Margaretta	Edison
1991-92	Margaretta, Oak Harbor	Huron, Port Clinton	Edison, Oak Harbor	Huron	Edison, Margaretta	Edison, Margaretta
1992-93	Clyde, St. Mary CC	Port Clinton	Margaretta	Clyde	Margaretta	Margaretta
1993-94	Clyde	Clyde	Clyde, St. Mary CC	Edison	Margaretta	Edison
1994-95	Clyde	Clyde, Perkins	Huron, St. Mary CC	Clyde	Margaretta	Edison, Clyde, Oak Harbor
1995-96	Clyde, Margaretta, Oak Harbor	Port Clinton	St. Mary CC	Clyde	Clyde	Oak Harbor, St. Mary CC
1996-97	Margaretta	Huron	Perkins	Huron	Huron	Oak Harbor
1997-98	Clyde, Margaretta	Huron	Perkins	Margaretta	Clyde	Clyde
1998-99	Huron	Perkins	Perkins	Margaretta	Margaretta	Oak Harbor
1999-00	Perkins	Oak Harbor	Clyde	Huron	Huron	Clyde
2000-01	Perkins	Oak Harbor	Perkins	Huron	Clyde, Margaretta	Clyde
2001-02	Huron, Margaretta	Port Clinton, St. Mary CC	Perkins	Huron	Margaretta, Perkins	Clyde, Oak Harbor
2002-03	Huron, Oak Harbor	Port Clinton	Perkins	Huron	Oak Harbor	Clyde
2003-04	Huron	Margaretta	Perkins	Huron	Oak Harbor	Clyde
2004-05	Huron	Huron	Port Clinton	Huron	Margaretta	Clyde
2005-06	Clyde, Huron	Huron	Perkins	Huron	Margaretta	Perkins
2006-07	Oak Harbor	Perkins	Perkins	Huron	Perkins	Perkins
2007-08	Clyde	Clyde	Perkins	Huron	Perkins	Clyde, Perkins
2008-09	Clyde	Edison	Perkins	Huron	Margaretta	Oak Harbor
2009-10	Clyde, Perkins	Port Clinton	Perkins	Huron	Perkins	Perkins
2010-11	Clyde	Edison	Perkins	Edison, Huron, Margaretta	Clyde	Perkins
2011-12	Clyde	Perkins	Oak Harbor	Edison	Clyde	Edison
2012-13	Perkins	Perkins	Perkins	Huron	Clyde	Perkins
2013-14	Perkins	Perkins	Perkins	Huron	Clyde	Edison
2014-15	Huron	Huron	Edison, Huron	Huron	Port Clinton	Perkins
2015-16	Clyde, Edison	Edison	Huron	Edison, Huron	Oak Harbor	Edison

== Championships - multi-division era ==
=== Divisional championships - fall sports ===
__Year__	Division	Cross C (Boys)	Cross C (Girls)	Football	Golf (Boys)	Golf (Girls)	Soccer (Boys)	Soccer (Girls)	Tennis (Girls)	Volleyball
2016-17	Bay	Edison	Edison	Clyde, Edison	Huron	Edison	Oak Harbor	Oak Harbor	Clyde	Huron
2016-17	River	Old Fort	St. Mary CC	Tiffin Calvert	New Riegel					Old Fort
2017-18	Lake	Shelby	Bellevue	Sandusky	Clyde	Shelby	Vermilion	Norwalk	Clyde	Norwalk
2017-18	Bay	Edison	Edison	Shelby	Vermillion	Edison	Edison	Edison	Willard	Oak Harbor
2017-18	River	Lakota	St. Mary CC	Calvert	Lakota					Calvert, New Riegel
2018-19	Lake	Norwalk	Columbian	Columbian, Clyde		Bellevue		Norwalk	Norwalk	Bellevue
2018-19	Bay			Oak Harbor		Huron			Willard	
2018-19	River			Gibsonburg						
2019-20	Lake	Norwalk	Columbian	Columbian, Norwalk	Norwalk	Bellevue	Norwalk	Norwalk	Norwalk	Bellevue, Norwalk
2019-20	Bay	Huron	Edison	Oak Harbor						
2019-20	River	Hopewell-Loudon	Hopewell-Loudon	Gibsonburg						
2020-21	Lake	Columbian	Columbian	Bellevue						Bellevue
2020-21	Bay	Huron	Edison	Huron						Huron
2020-21	River	New Riegel	Gibsonburg	Hopewell-Loudon						Hopewell-Loudon

=== Divisional championships - winter sports ===
__Year__	Division	Basketball (Boys)	Basketball (Girls)	Bowling (Boys)	Bowling (Girls)	Swimming (Boys)	Swimming (Girls)	Wrestling
2016-17	Bay	Huron, Perkins, Vermilion	Clyde	Perkins	Vermilion	Perkins	Oak Harbor	Edison
2016-17	River	Old Fort	St. Joseph CC, Old Fort					St. Mary CC
2017-18	Lake	Sandusky	Bellevue	Perkins	Perkins	Perkins	Perkins	Perkins
2017-18	Bay	Vermilion	Willard			Oak Harbor	Oak Harbor	Edison
2017-18	River	New Riegel, Old Fort	St. Joseph CC					St. Mary CC
2018-19	Lake	Norwalk	Bellevue					Perkins
2018-19	Bay	Vermilion, Willard	Margaretta			Huron/Dive		Edison
2018-19	River	Old Fort, St. Mary CC	Old Fort, St. Mary CC					Gibsonburg
2019-20	Lake	Sandusky	Bellevue					Perkins
2019-20	Bay	Oak Harbor, Willard				Huron/Dive		
2019-20	River	Old Fort						

=== Divisional championships - spring sports ===
__Year__	Division	Baseball	Softball	Tennis (Boys)	Track & Field (Boys)	Track & Field (Girls)
2016-17	Bay	Vermilion	Oak Harbor	Clyde	Perkins	Oak Harbor
2016-17	River		Old Fort		St. Joseph CC	St. Joseph CC
2017-18	Lake	Bellevue, Clyde	Bellevue	Clyde	Perkins	Shelby
2017-18	Bay	Vermilion			Edison	Oak Harbor
2017-18	River	Lakota			Calvert	St. Joseph CC
2018-19	Lake	Bellevue, Norwalk	Clyde		Columbian	Perkins
2018-19	Bay	Vermilion			Oak Harbor	Oak Harbor
2018-19	River				St. Joeseph CC	Lakota

== Historical maps ==
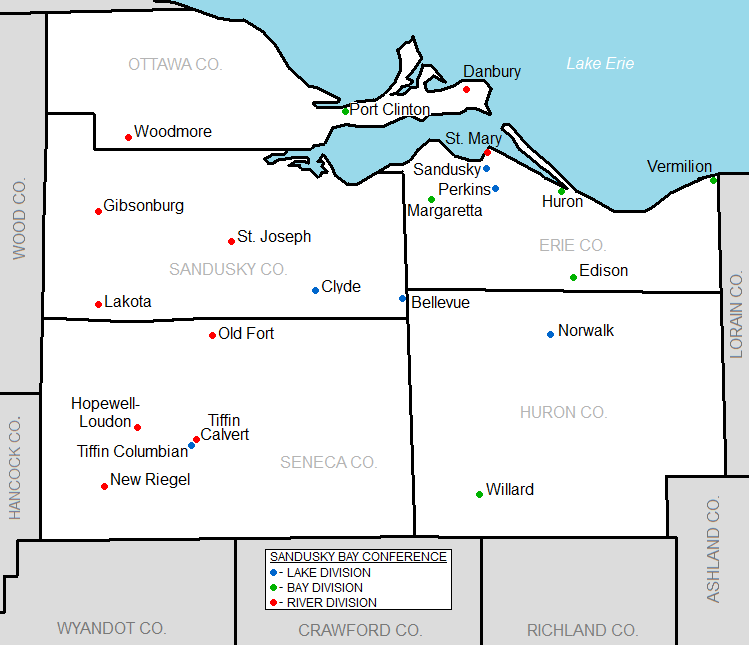
The overall SBC lineup and divisional breakdown from 2023-24 through 2025-26

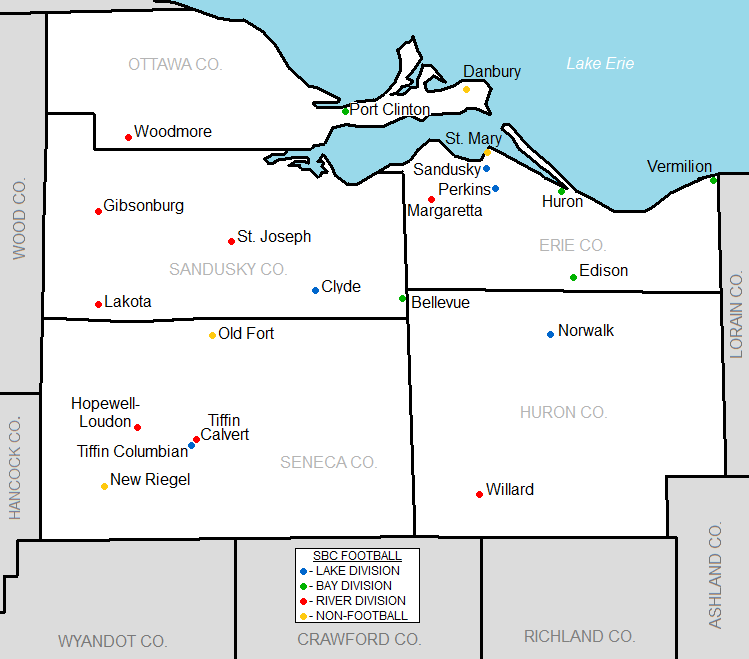
The football divisional breakdown from 2023-24 through 2025-26.
