= Vanguard-Sentinel Career and Technology Centers =

- Superintendent: Greg Edinger
- Location: Fremont & Tiffin, Ohio, U.S.
- Website: http://www.vscc.k12.oh.us/

The Vanguard-Sentinel Career and Technology Centers are joint vocational schools located in Fremont, Ohio and Tiffin, Ohio. Vanguard Tech Center is located in Fremont, adjacent to Fremont Ross High School (41°21′53.6″N 83°07′36.0″W), while Sentinel Career and Technology Center is located south of Tiffin (41°05′19.5″N 83°09′07.1″W).

VSCTC serves school districts primarily located in Ottawa, Sandusky, Seneca, Wood, and Wyandot counties, with parts of Crawford, Hancock, Huron, and Marion counties also served. A variety of programs are offered to 16 area high school juniors and seniors, which are split between the two locations.

== Schools served ==
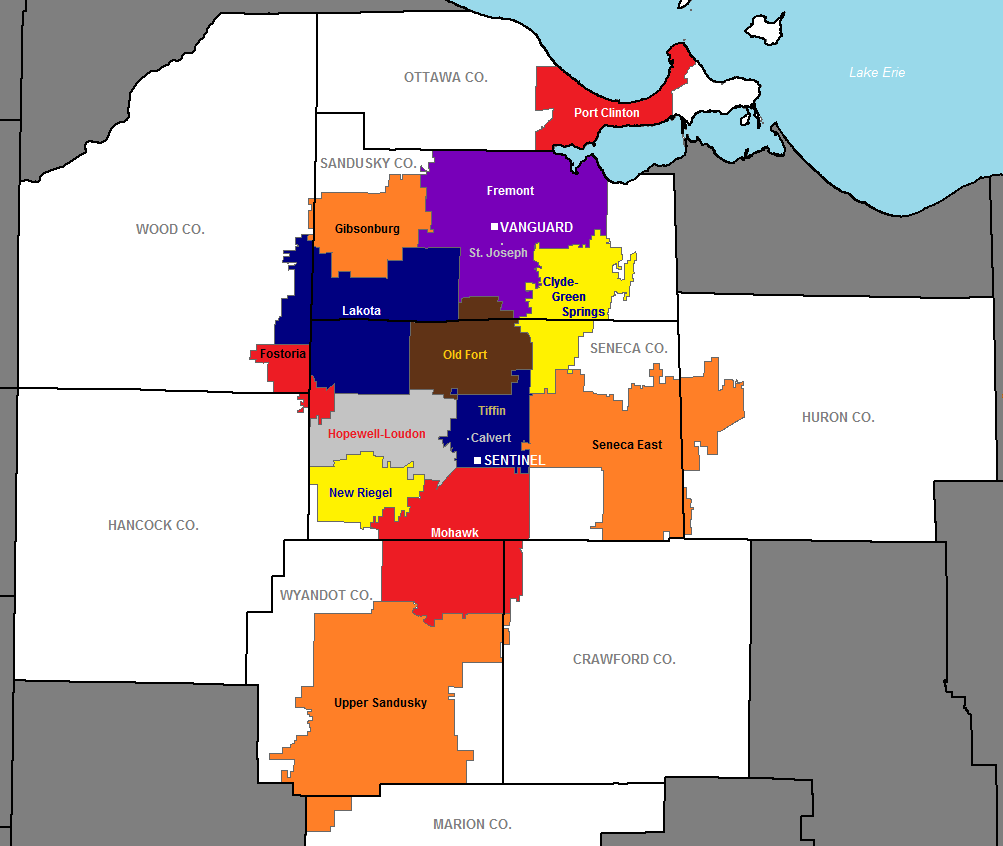
School districts served by Vanguard-Sentinel. The location of both buildings are marked with a white square in the Fremont and Tiffin school districts.

- Clyde High School
- Fremont Ross High School
- Fostoria High School
- Gibsonburg High School
- Hopewell-Loudon High School
- Lakota High School
- Mohawk High School
- New Riegel High School
- Old Fort High School
- Port Clinton High School
- St. Joseph Central Catholic High School
- Seneca East High School
- Tiffin Calvert High School
- Tiffin Columbian High School
- Upper Sandusky High School
