= Sandusky River League =

High school athletic league

The Sandusky River League was an OHSAA-sponsored league that began athletic play in the 2014-15 school year. The league sponsored football, cross country, volleyball, golf, basketball, wrestling, baseball, softball, and track & field. The following were the inaugural members:

== Members ==
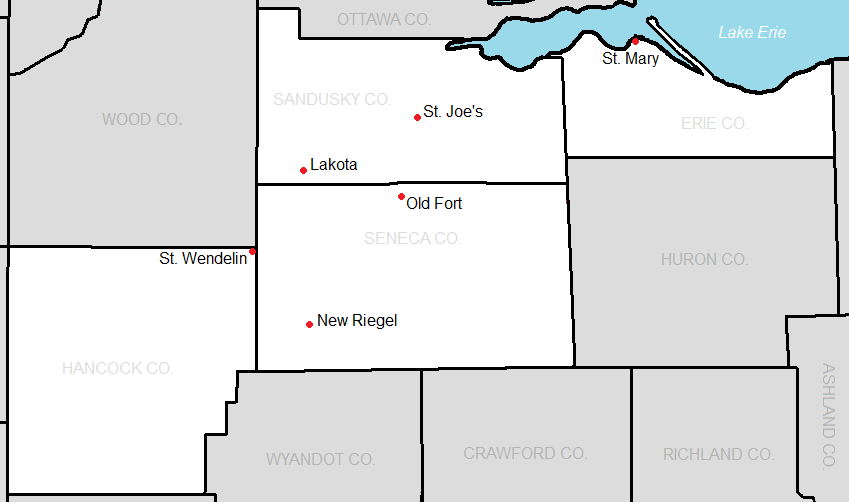
The members of the Sandusky River League for 2014-15.

School	Nickname	Location	District	Colors	Notes
Lakota	Raiders	Kansas	6:20	Navy Blue, White	
New Riegel	Blue Jackets	New Riegel		Navy Blue, Vegas Gold	non-football member
Old Fort	Stockaders	Old Fort		Brown, Gold	non-football member
St. Joseph (SJCC)	Crimson Streaks	Fremont	7:24	Crimson, Gray	
St. Mary (SMCC)	Panthers	Sandusky	7:23	Navy Blue, Vegas Gold	
St. Wendelin	Mohawks	Fostoria	7:24	Black, Gold	

== League championships ==
=== Boys championships ===
School Year	Golf	Football	Cross Country	Basketball	Wrestling	Baseball	Track & Field
2014-15	St. Mary CC	St. Mary CC	Old Fort	St. Mary CC	St. Mary CC	St. Mary CC	St. Joseph CC
2015-16	St. Mary CC	St. Mary CC	Old Fort	St. Mary CC	St. Mary CC	New Riegel	St. Joseph CC

=== Girls championships ===
School Year	Volleyball	Cross Country	Basketball	Softball	Track & Field
2014-15	New Riegel	St. Mary CC	New Riegel	New Riegel	St. Mary CC
2015-16	Old Fort	St. Mary CC	St. Wendelin	Lakota, New Riegel	St. Joseph CC

== League history ==
=== 2010s ===
- On February 1, 2013 the remaining schools of the Midland Athletic League (Tiffin Calvert, New Riegel, Lakota, Old Fort, and Fremont St. Joseph) along with Sandusky St. Mary Central Catholic of the Sandusky Bay Conference (SBC) announced they would form the new Sandusky River League, beginning play in the 2014-15 season. The new league became necessary when the MAL began to disintegrate after Seneca East, Mohawk, and Carey announced they would be leaving the MAL to join the new Northern 10 Athletic Conference in 2014. Soon after the announcement that these three schools would depart the MAL, Hopewell–Loudon and North Baltimore left the MAL for the Blanchard Valley Conference. Fremont St. Joseph, Lakota, and Tiffin Calvert became the only remaining MAL football schools. At the same time the MAL was breaking up, Sandusky St. Mary Central Catholic had been exploring league options because of the large difference in their student enrollment compared to the other SBC schools.
- However, with only four football schools the league’s future is tenuous. It will be necessary to expand to at least six football schools to maintain a workable football schedule. Area schools that sponsor football and are of similar enrollment to SRL schools are Woodmore, Gibsonburg, Margaretta, and Danbury. Some of these schools have shown interest in the SRL, but may be waiting for a commitment from others before leaving the safety of their current affiliations.
- Despite concern over numbers and participation in sports, the league extended invitations to both Bettsville and St. Wendelin high schools and welcomed them to apply for membership. St. Wendelin applied immediately and also looked at other leagues and options.
- On February 9, 2013 Mark King, who was the former commissioner of the Midland Athletic League, is named the commissioner of the Sandusky River League.
- On March 19, 2013 the SRL voted 6-0 to accept Fostoria St. Wendelin as a full-time member except for football, for which they will continue to participate in the Michigan-based Christian Athletic League of America. St. Wendelin was later admitted as a full member in football in time for the 2014-15 school year.
- On April 4, 2014, it was confirmed that Bettsville would not be admitted to the SRL and would compete as an independent following the MAL's demise.
- On May 13, 2013, Tiffin Calvert was unanimously voted in as the 11th member of the TAAC for 2014. They will join the TAAC without actually competing in the SRL.
- In July 2014, Bettsville ceased to exist as a school district, with its students absorbed into Old Fort's school district.
- On December 10, 2014, the Sandusky Bay Conference announced plans to expand beginning with the 2016-17 school year that would include all schools currently in the SRL, along with Tiffin Calvert and Vermilion. The SRL effectively disbanded after the spring sports season in 2016.

== See also ==
- Ohio high school athletic conferences
- Midland Athletic League
