= Blanchard Valley Conference =

Northwest Ohio High School athletic conference

The Blanchard Valley Conference is an Ohio High School Athletic Association affiliated athletic league located in Hancock, Hardin, Putnam, and Wood Counties in northwest Ohio. Its name derives from the Blanchard River, which runs through the area in which the schools are located. Findlay & Liberty-Benton, members of the Northern Lakes League, and Cory-Rawson, member of the Northwest Central Conference, are the only high schools in Hancock County that are a member of the Ohio High School Athletic Association that aren't part of the BVC.

== Current members ==
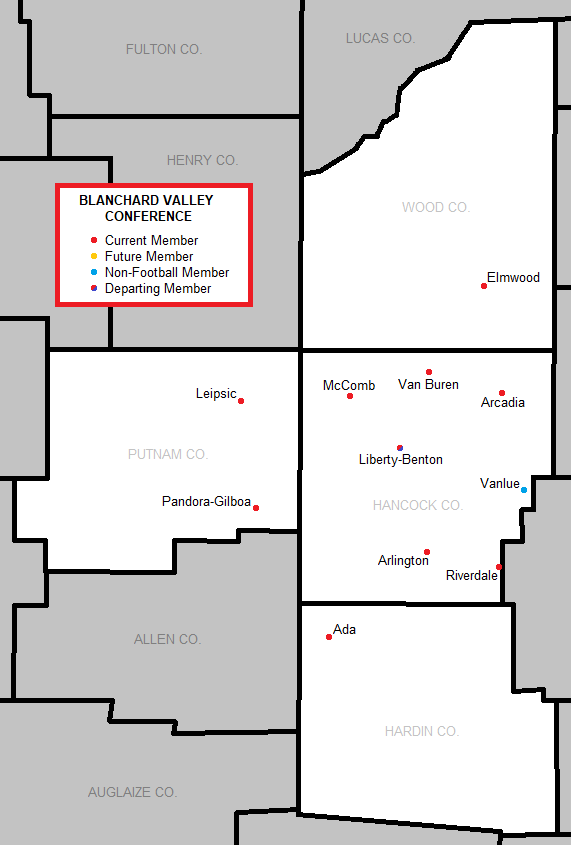
Map of the current BVC members for 2024-2025.

School	Nickname	Location	Enrollment (Pre CB Males 2025)	State FB Region (2025)	Colors	Tenure	Previous Conference
Ada	Bulldogs	Ada	102	7:26		2024-	Northwest Conference
Arcadia	Redskins	Arcadia	79	7:26		1922-	none
Arlington	Red Devils	Arlington	59	7:26		1922-	none
Elmwood	Royals	Bloomdale	134	6:22		2023-	Northern Buckeye Conference
Leipsic	Vikings	Leipsic	89	7:26		1966-2021 (fb); 1971-2021 (all); 2024-	Northwest Conference
McComb	Panthers	McComb	72	7:26		1922-	none
Pandora-Gilboa^{1}	Rockets	Pandora	80	7:26		1966- (fb); 1971- (all)	Putnam County (Present/non-football), Northwest Conference^{2}, UNKNOWN League^{3}
Riverdale	Falcons	Mt. Blanchard	125	6:22		2014-	North Central Conference
Van Buren	Black Knights	Van Buren	128	6:22		1922-	none
Vanlue	Wildcats	Vanlue	25	Non football member		1922- (all); 1922-2022 (fb)	none

1. Pandora-Gilboa is also a current member of the Putnam County League.

2.Charter Member 3.Need to check the league/conference name. P-G won conference title in another conference other than the BVC & NWC once.

== Former members ==
School	Nickname	Location	Colors	Year Joined	Previous Conference	Year Left	Conference Joined
Cory-Rawson	Hornets	Rawson		1950	none	2023	Northwest Central
Hardin Northern	Polar Bears	Dola		1965	Hardin County	2014	Northwest Central
Hopewell-Loudon	Chieftains	Bascom		2014	Midland	2019	Sandusky Bay Conference
Liberty-Benton	Eagles	Benton Ridge		1922	none	2026	Northern Lakes
Mount Blanchard	Purple Hurricanes	Mount Blanchard		1922	none	1960	Hardin County
Mount Cory	Shamrocks	Mount Cory		1922	none	1950	none (consolidated into Cory-Rawson)
North Baltimore	Tigers	North Baltimore		2014-2023	Midland Athletic League	2023	Northwest Central
Rawson	Raiders	Rawson		1922	none	1950	none (consolidated into Cory-Rawson)
Westwood	Warriors	Rudolph	unknown	1965	Lakeshore	1966	none (consolidated into Bowling Green)

== League history ==
The BVC's roots lie in the Hancock County League often known as the Little 9/8/7 League, which formed in 1922. Arcadia, Arlington, Liberty-Benton, McComb, Mount Blanchard, Mount Cory, Rawson, Van Buren, Vanlue were the founding members. Cory-Rawson was formed by the consolidation of Mount Cory and Rawson in 1950. The eight team lineup lasted for another decade, until Mount Blanchard (due to consolidate into Riverdale in 1962) joined the Hardin County League.

The remaining seven members decided to reorganize the league in 1965 and add other schools, forming the BVC. Hardin Northern, Leipsic (football only), and Westwood signed on to make the conference a 9 member/10 football member conference. When Westwood was absorbed by the Bowling Green City School District in 1966, Pandora-Gilboa replaced them in the league for the 1966–67 school year in football only. Leipsic and Pandora-Gilboa were both members of the Putnam County League for all non-football sports at this time.

Leipsic and Pandora-Gilboa were able to work out schedules with the PCL to be able to join the BVC in all sports, while keeping membership in both conferences, in 1971.

On April 19, 2012, Ada High School of the Northwest Conference, along with Calvert, Hopewell-Loudon, and North Baltimore of the Midland Athletic League made pitches to join the BVC after answering a letter of interest made in February 2012.

On May 21, 2012, the BVC extended invitations to Hopewell-Loudon and North Baltimore with the following report coming from the Findlay Courier:

By an 8-0 vote, with two abstentions, member schools of the Blanchard Valley Conference on Monday voted to approve expansion. North Baltimore and Hopewell-Loudon were formally invited to join the league. Those two schools have until July 1 to accept. Expansion would take effect for the 2014-15 school year. BVC officials still hope to add two more schools to eventually make the conference a 14-team league. Football would be split into two divisions, based on boys enrollment figures combined with a multiplier of wins over the previous four seasons. The schools would then be ranked 1-12 (or 1-14, if two more schools are added); odd-number ranked teams would make up one division and even-number ranked teams the other. There will be no North-South, East-West or straight enrollment-based split of divisions. Under a 12-team format, each football team would play the other teams in its division once, have two crossover games with the other division and an eighth conference game against a team in the same slot in the other division. Each school would have a second non-conference game on its schedule. All other sports will be in a single-division format. The two BVC members who are also part of the Putnam County League, Leipsic and Pandora-Gilboa, will remain full members of the PCL.

North Baltimore accepted the BVC's invitation on June 19, 2012, and Hopewell-Loudon did the same a day later. Both schools joined for the 2014–15 season.

In April 2013, BVC President Traci Conley indicated the BVC wanted to expand to 14 members and first sent an invitation to Riverdale High School. Riverdale accepted the invitation on April 22, 2013, which meant the BVC wanted to pursue a 14th member to join the league. Riverdale's membership in the N10 was terminated shortly thereafter, and they would likely not have joined the BVC until 2015–16 at the earliest, but with Hardin Northern dropping football in 2013, Riverdale was admitted for all sports beginning in 2014.

This expansion of the conference of the latest 3 schools was controversial, and charged with nickname the "Liberty-Benton Membership-Extension Addition" because it was an obvious attempt by the school to balance average school enrollment figures for Liberty-Benton to justify continuing their membership in the conference. Supporting evidence of this nickname comes from Liberty-Benton officials commenting on spectator and media statements of the school needing to apply for a new conference because of the school is placed in Division V for football as all other schools in the conference were only in Division VII. School Officials said the school would have to look for a new conference by 2016 if the expansion did not pass.

In May 2013, Upper Scioto Valley publicly indicated that they were interested in joining the BVC as its 14th member, since they felt that its league, the Northwest Central Conference was no longer stable.

The NWCC extended an invitation to Hardin Northern in late 2013, which also required a response by March 1, 2014. After suspending Hardin Northern from league play in football from 2013 to 2015, the BVC voted 9-1 (HN the lone dissenting vote) to refuse a guarantee that Hardin Northern would return to the league for that sport. This pressure caused Hardin Northern's school board to decide on February 19, 2014, to withdraw from the BVC and apply to the NWCC for membership. The NWCC accepted Hardin Northern as a full member for 2014–15 on March 19, 2014, with football joining in 2015–16.

Hopewell-Loudon announced in August 2017 that they would leave the BVC for the Sandusky Bay Conference in the 2019–2020 school year after being offered an invitation to replace Shelby.

In August 2020, Elmwood High School of the Northern Buckeye Conference announced they had received a formal invitation from the BVC and were seriously looking at the opportunity. Following a school board meeting on February 8, 2021, multiple sources confirmed that Elmwood had unanimously approved to leave the NBC and join the BVC for the 2023–2024 school year or sooner.

At a board meeting on March 18, 2021, Cory-Rawson voted to leave the BVC for the Northwest Central Conference (NWCC) in 2023.

In August 2021, North Baltimore announced that their football team would go independent beginning with the 2022 season but remain in the BVC for the rest of their sports. This however, would change on Nov. 2, 2021 when North Baltimore announced they would join the NWCC fully for the 2023–24 school year.

Liberty-Benton and the BVC announced in May 2022 that the Eagles would be leaving the league after the 2025–2026 school year, citing the district's student enrollment, competitive accomplishment and athletic facilities as reasons for the decision. At the time of the announcement, Liberty-Benton did not indicate if they had another league they were invited to join or to consider for membership.

The BVC Governing Board voted on December 16, 2022, to remove Vanlue's football team from the conference beginning with the 2023–24 school year. Vanlue intends to continue fielding an 11-man football team, but has no league affiliation yet going forward.

On April 26, 2023, the school board at Ada voted to accept the BVC's invitation to join the league. No timeframe had initially been set for when the Bulldogs would switch conferences, but it was reported in June 2023 that they would join the BVC for the 2024–25 school year.

During a special board meeting held on Sunday, May 21, 2023, the Leipsic school board voted to rejoin the BVC. Similar to Ada, a timeframe for returning to their old league was not initially established, but they are aiming to get in the same time as Ada.

Liberty-Benton accepted an invitation on January 27, 2025, to join the Northern Lakes League as a member of the Cardinal Division beginning in the 2026-27 school year.

== Enrollment ==
The current enrollments of the nine BVC schools.

School	Boys Enrollment 2017	Girls Enrollment 2017	Total Enrollment 2017
Arcadia	65	81	146
Arlington	71	78	149
Elmwood			
Liberty-Benton	140	149	289
McComb	94	78	172
Pandora-Gilboa	64	57	121
Riverdale	112	94	206
Van Buren	147	116	263
Vanlue	30	24	54

== Football champions ==
Year	Champions
1965	Cory-Rawson, McComb
1966	McComb
1967	McComb
1968	Cory Rawson (State Champs - unscored upon)
1969	McComb
1970	Cory-Rawson, Arlington, McComb
1971	Cory-Rawson, McComb
1972	Arlington
1973	Cory-Rawson
1974	Liberty-Benton
1975	Arlington, Leipsic
1976	Arlington
1977	LB
1978	Liberty-Benton
1979	Arlington
1980	Pandora-Gilboa, Cory-Rawson, McComb
1981	Leipsic
1982	McComb (State Champions)
1983	McComb
1984	McComb
1985	McComb
1986	Arlington, McComb
1987	Arlington
1988	Van Buren
1989	Van Buren
1990	McComb
1991	Van Buren, McComb
1992	Cory-Rawson
1993	Hardin Northern, McComb
1994	Hardin Northern, Leipsic
1995	Hardin Northern
1996	Hardin Northern
1997	Hardin Northern
1998	Pandora-Gilboa, Hardin Northern
1999	Pandora-Gilboa
2000	McComb
2001	McComb
2002	Hardin Northern
2003	Cory-Rawson, Hardin Northern
2004	Liberty-Benton
2005	Hardin Northern
2006	Liberty-Benton
2007	Liberty-Benton
2008	Liberty-Benton
2009	Leipsic
2010	McComb
2011	Leipsic
2012	McComb
2013	Liberty-Benton
2014	Blanchard: Liberty-Benton, Valley: Van Buren
2015	Blanchard:McComb, Valley: Van Buren
2016	McComb
2017	Liberty-Benton, McComb
2018	Pandora-Gilboa
2019	Liberty-Benton
2020	Liberty-Benton
2021	McComb
2022	McComb
2023	Liberty-Benton
2024	Liberty-Benton

== See also ==
- Ohio High School Athletic Conferences
