= Northern 10 Athletic Conference =

Ohio high school athletic conference

The Northern 10 Athletic Conference (also known as the Northern 10 or N10) is an Ohio High School Athletic Association athletic conference that is currently made up of 14 schools from Northern Ohio and began athletic competition in 2014.

== Members ==
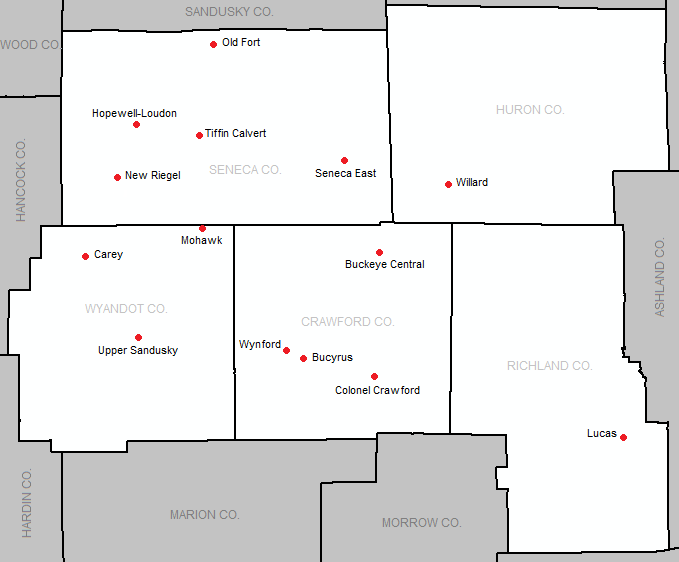
Map showing the current members of the Northern 10 Athletic Conference.

School	Nickname	Location	Colors	Tenure
Buckeye Central	Bucks	New Washington	Scarlet, gray	2014–
Bucyrus	Redmen	Bucyrus	Red, white	2014–
Calvert	Senecas	Tiffin	Royal blue, white	2026-
Carey	Blue Devils	Carey	Blue, white	2014–
Colonel Crawford	Eagles	North Robinson	Black, gold	2014–
Hopewell-Loudon	Chieftains	Bascom	Scarlet, gray	2026-
Lucas	Cubs	Lucas	Orange, black	2026-
Mohawk	Warriors	Sycamore	Red, black	2014–
New Riegel	Blue Jackets	New Riegel	Navy blue, vegas gold	2026-
Old Fort	Stockaders	Old Fort	Brown, gold	2026-
Seneca East	Tigers	Attica	Orange, black	2014–
Upper Sandusky	Rams	Upper Sandusky	Black, orange	2014–
Willard	Crimson Flashes	Willard	Crimson, white	2026-
Wynford	Royals	Bucyrus	Royal blue, gray	2014–

== Former members ==
School	Nickname	Location	Colors	Tenure
Crestline	Bulldogs	Crestline	Blue, white	2014–2015
Ridgedale	Rockets	Morral	Columbia blue, red	2014–2021; football 2014–2016

== History ==
The Northern 10 conference was founded in 2012 by ten schools located in North-central Ohio. Six of these schools (Buckeye Central, Bucyrus, Colonel Crawford, Crestline, Riverdale, and Wynford) came from the North Central Conference, three (Carey, Mohawk, and Seneca East) came from the Midland Athletic League, and one (Ridgedale) came from the Mid-Ohio Athletic Conference. The creation of the league effectively disbanded the North Central Conference as its four remaining members would eventually agree to join other leagues by 2014. The departure of Carey, Mohawk, and Seneca East from the Midland Athletic League similarly started a chain reaction within that conference, resulting in the departure of its remaining members, ultimately leading to its dissolution that same year.

Blanchard Valley Conference President Traci Conley indicated the BVC wanted to expand to 14 members and sent an invitation to Riverdale High School, which is located in Hancock County, Ohio with most BVC schools. Riverdale accepted the BVC's invitation on April 22, 2013. In June 2013, the N10 invited Upper Sandusky to take Riverdale's place in 2014, after the Rams had agreed to join the MOAC. Upper Sandusky accepted the offer and joined the N10 in all sports except football, which jumped over in 2015.

Crestline announced in 2014 that it would leave to join the Mid-Buckeye Conference in 2015–16, which they felt would be a more competitive league for the Bulldogs.

Ridgedale announced that they would not play a league schedule for football during the 2017 season. Citing low numbers, frequent injuries, and numerous losses over the last few years, the Rockets began to play an independent schedule against other area teams beginning in 2017. Preparing for the future, the N10 decided to go forward with an eight-team league schedule (playing seven league games during football weeks 4–10) beginning in 2018.

Ridgedale's school board voted 3–2 in late 2019 to leave the N10 and join the Northwest Central Conference beginning with the 2021–2022 school year. This left the N10 with 8 total members.

On November 8, 2024, the N10 announced that they intended to expand the league from its current eight schools to 14 schools (12 football playing schools) competing in two divisional alignments. The N10 later announced on February 26, 2025 that they had invited six schools to join their league: Hopewell-Loudon, Lucas, New Riegel (no football), Old Fort (no football), Tiffin Calvert, and Willard. Willard and New Riegel accepted their invitation on March 12th while Lucas accepted on March 18, 2025. Calvert, Hopewell-Loudon, and Old Fort were included in a statement from the league on March 28, 2025 that announced all six were being added to the league for the 2026–2027 school year.

== League championships ==
=== Boys championships ===
School year	Football	Cross country	Golf	Basketball	Swimming	Wrestling	Baseball	Track & field
2014–15	Wynford	Colonel Crawford	Mohawk	Colonel Crawford	Colonel Crawford	Mohawk	Seneca East	Colonel Crawford
2015–16	Wynford	Colonel Crawford	Mohawk	Upper Sandusky	No Champion	Mohawk	Wynford	Colonel Crawford
2016–17	Wynford	Colonel Crawford	Mohawk	Upper Sandusky	No Champion	Upper Sandusky	Seneca East	Colonel Crawford
2017–18	Wynford	Colonel Crawford	Carey/Ridgedale	Upper Sandusky	No Champion	Upper Sandusky	Seneca East/Carey	Colonel Crawford
2018–19	Mohawk	Colonel Crawford	Upper Sandusky	Mohawk	No Champion	Mohawk	Upper Sandusky	Colonel Crawford
2019–20	Wynford/Seneca East	Upper Sandusky	Seneca East	Upper Sandusky	No Champion	Mohawk	No Champion	No Champion
2020–21	Colonel Crawford	Upper Sandusky	Seneca East	Colonel Crawford	No Champion	Mohawk	Colonel Crawford	Seneca East
2021-22	Carey	Seneca East	Upper Sandusky	Colonel Crawford	No Champion	Mohawk	Wynford	Seneca East
2022-23	Carey	Upper Sandusky	Wynford	Carey	No Champion	Mohawk	Upper Sandusky	Seneca East
2023-24	Carey	Seneca East	Upper Sandusky	Carey/Colonel Crawford/Mohawk/Seneca East	No Champion	Mohawk	Upper Sandusky	Seneca East
2024-25	Mohawk	Colonel Crawford	Wynford	Colonel Crawford	No Champion	Carey	Upper Sandusky/Mohawk	Colonel Crawford
2025-26	Carey/Colonel Crawford	Colonel Crawford	Wynford	Colonel Crawford	No Champion	Mohawk	Carey	Colonel Crawford

=== Girls championships ===
School year	Volleyball	Cross country	Golf	Basketball	Swimming	Softball	Track & field
2014–15	Upper Sandusky	Mohawk	No Champion	Carey	Colonel Crawford	Upper Sandusky	Colonel Crawford
2015–16	Upper Sandusky	Seneca East	No Champion	Carey	No Champion	Colonel Crawford/Upper Sandusky	Colonel Crawford
2016–17	Buckeye Central	Carey	Buckeye Central	Upper Sandusky	No Champion	Upper Sandusky	Colonel Crawford
2017–18	Buckeye Central	Upper Sandusky	Buckeye Central	Buckeye Central	No Champion	Carey, Bucyrus	Upper Sandusky
2018–19	Mohawk	Seneca East	Buckeye Central	Seneca East	No Champion	Upper Sandusky	Colonel Crawford
2019–20	Buckeye Central	Carey	Colonel Crawford	Seneca East	No Champion	No Champion	No Champion
2020–21	Buckeye Central	Colonel Crawford	Colonel Crawford	Buckeye Central	No Champion	Bucyrus	Colonel Crawford
2021-22	Buckeye Central	Colonel Crawford	Colonel Crawford	Buckeye Central	No Champion	Colonel Crawford/Mohawk	Colonel Crawford
2022-23	Mohawk	Colonel Crawford	Colonel Crawford	Buckeye Central	No Champion	Carey/Upper Sandusky	Colonel Crawford
2023-24	Mohawk	Seneca East	Colonel Crawford	Carey	No Champion	Mohawk	Colonel Crawford
2024-25	Mohawk	Upper Sandusky	Wynford	Colonel Crawford	No Champion	Mohawk	Colonel Crawford
2025-26	Buckeye Central/Mohawk	Upper Sandusky	Wynford	Colonel Crawford	No Champion	Mohawk	Upper Sandusky
