= Bettsville High School =

Location
- 118 Washington Street; Bettsville, Ohio 44815
- Coordinates: 41.245°N 83.232°W

Information
- Type: Public
- Closed: 2014 (Consolidated with Old Fort High School)
- School district: Bettsville Local Schools
- Principal: Paul Orshoski
- Grades: K-12
- Colors: Black and Orange
- Mascot: Bobcats
- Website: www.bettsville.k12.oh.us

Bettsville High School was a public high school in Bettsville, Ohio. It was the only high school in the Bettsville Local Schools district. Their nickname was the Bobcats. They were members of the Midland Athletic League.

Bettsville High School was part of the K-12 Bettsville School. The entire district was located in north-central Seneca County and covered most of Liberty Township, as well as the town of Bettsville itself.

When the Midland Athletic League folded in 2014, Bettsville was to become an athletic independent, but its consolidation with Old Fort prevented such an issue.

== Bettsville's final school year ==
In January 2014, a community forum of 200+ people at the Bettsville school showed that a majority were in favor of letting their district be absorbed into the neighboring school district for Old Fort. This was mainly due to the increasingly large deficit the Bettsville school board was faced with, which was estimated to be around $775,000. The school district was also placed under fiscal emergency on February 6, 2014, by state auditor Dave Yost. Old Fort was decided as the best fit after approaching other neighboring districts because Bettsville and Old Fort already shared administration and staff. Bettsville's school became a much-needed K-6 building for Old Fort while the 7-12 students would attend Old Fort High School.

Other less popular options voted on were to keep Bettsville open, but make severe cuts to staff and extracurricular activities while asking for a levy to pass; or to allow the students to open-enroll at other districts and keep the building open solely to be cared for by a maintenance staff.

Bettsville's board of education approved the resolution to join under Old Fort, which was then approved by Old Fort's board. For the 2014–15 school year, Bettsville's district territory transferred to Old Fort's.

== Athletics ==
=== Midland Athletic League championships (1985-2014) ===
- Boys Cross Country: 1986
- Golf: 1993, 1995
