= Paul Gillmor =

American politician (1939–2007)

Paul E. Gillmor
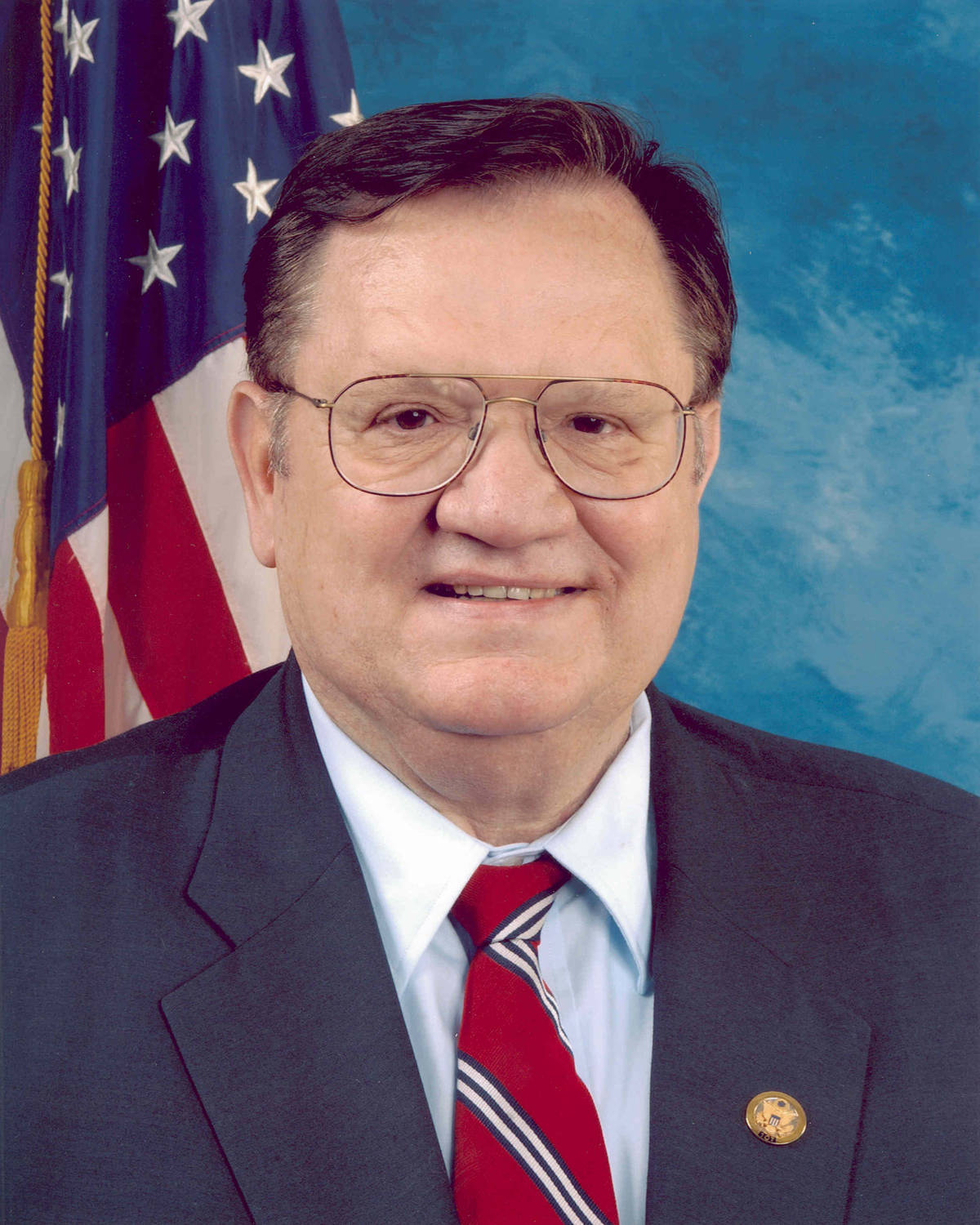

Member of the U.S. House of Representatives from Ohio's 5th district
- In office January 3, 1989 – September 5, 2007
- Preceded by: Del Latta
- Succeeded by: Bob Latta

President of the Ohio Senate
- In office January 3, 1985 – December 31, 1988
- Preceded by: Harry Meshel
- Succeeded by: Stanley Aronoff
- In office January 3, 1981 – December 31, 1982
- Preceded by: Oliver Ocasek
- Succeeded by: Harry Meshel

Member of the Ohio Senate from the 2nd district
- In office January 3, 1967 – December 31, 1988
- Preceded by: Inaugural holder
- Succeeded by: Betty Montgomery

Personal details
- Born: February 1, 1939 Tiffin, Ohio, U.S.
- Died: September 5, 2007 (aged 68) Arlington County, Virginia, U.S.
- Party: Republican
- Spouse(s): Brenda Lee Luckey (died 1972) Karen Lako (m. 1983)
- Children: 5
- Education: Ohio Wesleyan University; University of Michigan Law School
- Profession: Attorney

Paul Eugene Gillmor (February 1, 1939 – September 5, 2007) was an American politician of the Republican Party who served as the U.S. representative from the 5th congressional district of Ohio from 1989 until his death in 2007.

== Early life, career, and family ==
Gillmor was born in Tiffin, Ohio and grew up in Old Fort; his father owned a trucking business in the area. His mother was Lucy Fry Gillmor. He attended Old Fort High School, graduating in 1957. In 1961 he received a Bachelor of Arts degree from Ohio Wesleyan University. In 1964, he graduated with a law degree from the University of Michigan.

From 1965 to 1966, Gillmor was on active duty in the U.S. Air Force as a Judge Advocate, attaining the rank of captain. He then entered the practice of law.

Paul Gillmor married Brenda Lee Luckey. She died in a car accident in Fremont, Ohio in September 1972. They had two daughters, Linda and Julie, who were in the car at the time.

Gillmor married Karen Lako, who also served in the Ohio Senate, in 1983. They had three sons: Paul Michael and twins Adam and Connor.

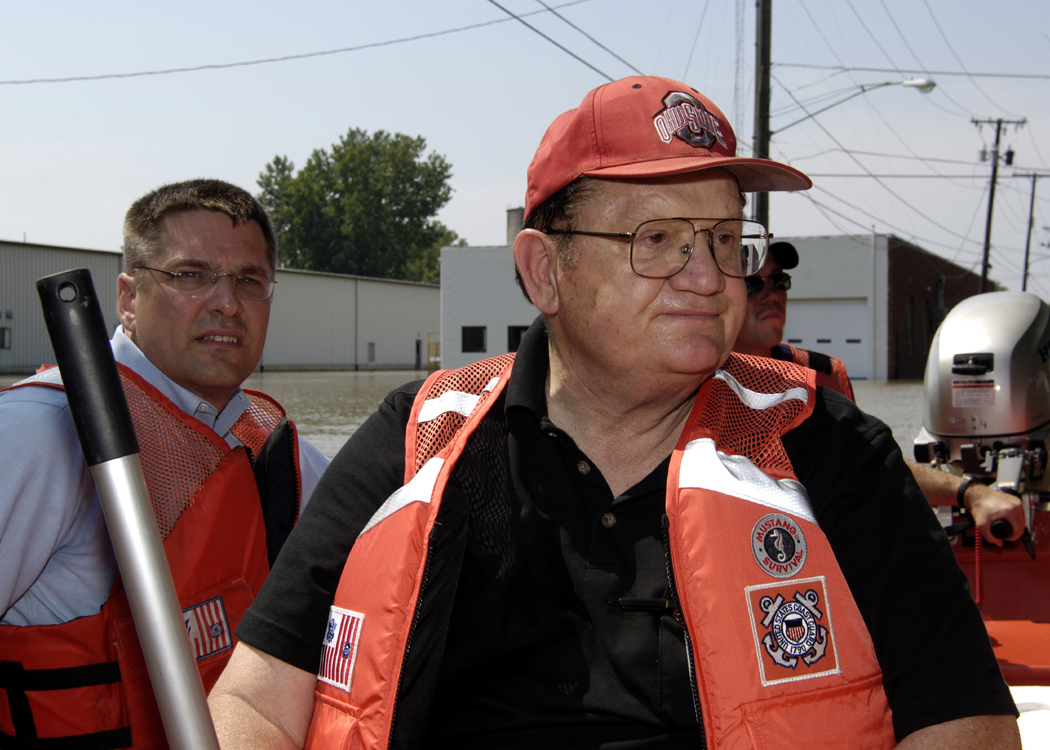
Paul Gillmor tours flood-ravaged Ottawa, Ohio on August 24, 2007, twelve days before his death

== Political career ==
=== Ohio State Senate ===
Gillmor was elected as an Ohio state senator in 1967, where he remained until being elected to Congress in 1988. For the last 10 years of his tenure, he was the leader of the Republicans in the chamber, serving as president of the state senate for three General Assemblies from 1981 to 1982 and from 1985 to 1988. He ran in the 1986 Republican primary for governor, but lost to former governor James A. Rhodes.

=== U.S. Congress ===
==== Elections ====
In 1988, Gillmor entered the Republican primary for the 5th District after 30-year incumbent Del Latta retired. Latta endorsed his son, Bob, as his successor; Gillmor defeated him by only 27 votes. He was then handily elected in November and was reelected nine times in this heavily Republican district, usually by margins of 2-to-1. He ran unopposed in 1992.

In 2002, Gillmor defeated Republican Rex Damschroder in the primary.

==== Committees and positions ====
Gillmor was the ranking Republican on the Financial Institutions and Consumer Credit Subcommittee of the Financial Services Committee. He also served on the Energy and Commerce Committee, and chaired its Environment and Hazardous Materials Subcommittee until the Republicans lost control of Congress following the 2006 elections. In 2006, Gillmor served as a member of a bipartisan reform task force on ethics and congressional mailing practices. He was a member of the moderate Republican Main Street Partnership.

The American Conservative Union gave Gillmor's 2005 voting record a rating of 82 points out of a possible 100; the liberal Americans for Democratic Action gave him a 0 rating.

Gillmor joined with Massachusetts Congressman Barney Frank to propose the Industrial Bank Holding Company Act of 2006, which was designed to prevent retailers such as Wal-Mart and Home Depot from operating banks to process their credit card transactions.

== Banking interests ==
Gillmor became partial owner of Old Fort Bank in Seneca County, about 60 miles (97 km) southeast of Toledo, after the death of his father, Paul M. Gillmor.

In 2007, Gillmor received approval from the House Committee on Standards of Official Conduct and the offices of two federal regulators to be an initial director and investor in a new Florida bank, the Panther Community Bank.

== Death ==
On September 5, 2007, Gillmor was found dead in his Arlington County, Virginia, townhouse by members of his staff after he failed to show up for a House Financial Services Committee meeting, and did not respond to repeated telephone calls and e-mails. While it was initially believed that he died from a heart attack, the Virginia state medical examiner's office announced that Gillmor died from blunt head and neck trauma consistent with a fall down the stairs. Police assessed the scene and ruled out foul play. Gillmor's death was ruled an accident.

In a special election held in December, Bob Latta, the man Gillmor had narrowly defeated in the 1988 primary, won the seat.

== See also ==
- List of United States representatives from Ohio
- List of members of the United States Congress who died in office (2000–present)#2000s

== Notes and references ==
U.S. House of Representatives
Preceded by Del Latta	Member of the U.S. House of Representatives from Ohio's 5th congressional district January 3, 1989 – September 5, 2007	Succeeded by Bob Latta
