= St. Wendelin High School =

St. Wendelin Catholic School

Location
- 533 North Countyline Street; Fostoria, (Hancock County), Ohio 44830-1503; United States; 41°9′47″N 83°25′18″W

Information
- Type: Private, Coeducational
- Motto: Believe. Lead. Succeed.
- Religious affiliation: Roman Catholic
- Patron saint: St. Wendelin
- Established: 1873
- Closed: 2019
- Superintendent: Rev. Todd Dominique
- Director: John Hay
- Principal: Teresa Kitchen
- Grades: K–12
- Classes: College Prep, Advanced Placement, Honors, College Credit, Dual Enrollment Courses
- Average class size: 18
- Student to teacher ratio: 1:8 Teacher-Student Ratio
- Campus size: Small
- Colors: Black and Gold
- Slogan: A History of Excellence, A Future of Unlimited Possibilities
- Mascot: Mohawks
- Team name: Mohawks
- National ranking: 1
- Asst Principal: James Brake
- Athletic Director: Shane Burnworth
- Website: http://www.stwendelin.org

St. Wendelin Catholic School was a private, Catholic high school in Fostoria, Ohio. It was part of the Roman Catholic Diocese of Toledo.

== Background ==
St. Wendelin Catholic School was founded in 1887. Its first graduating class was 1910 and consisted of one student.

St. Wendelin was home to many good sports teams over the years, including a great Girls Basketball run that included back to back State Final Four appearances and one State Championship appearance. At some point the Mohawks were part of the Seaway Conference (1959–1967), the Sandusky Bay Conference (1968-1972, 2016-2017), the Lakeshore Conference (1982-1985), the Midland Athletic League (1985-2014), and the Sandusky River League (2014-2016). They competed in cross country, golf, volleyball, basketball, wrestling, track, softball, and baseball.

Due to issues with numbers and competitive balance, St. Wendelin's football team dropped out of the MAL after the 2008 season and played in the Northwest Central Conference for 2009 and 2010. They were then asked to leave the NWCC after canceling multiple games and began competing in the Lansing, Michigan-based Christian Athletic League of America in 2011. This league was made up of 14 teams from the Indiana-Michigan-Ohio tri-state area that were composed of players from schools that did not offer football, home-schooled youngsters, and students who did not wish to play on their own school's team.

== Closing ==
On April 21, 2017, St. Wendelin High School announced it would close in June following the 2016–17 school year. The primary concerns were finances and a dwindling enrollment (one-third of its 100 students at the time were graduating seniors). The St. Wendelin Parish continued to operate a K-8 school at the same location on Countyline Street for another two years, but the elementary school subsequently closed in 2019. Demolition of the school began in early August 2021 in preparation to sell the building.
