= Cory–Rawson High School =

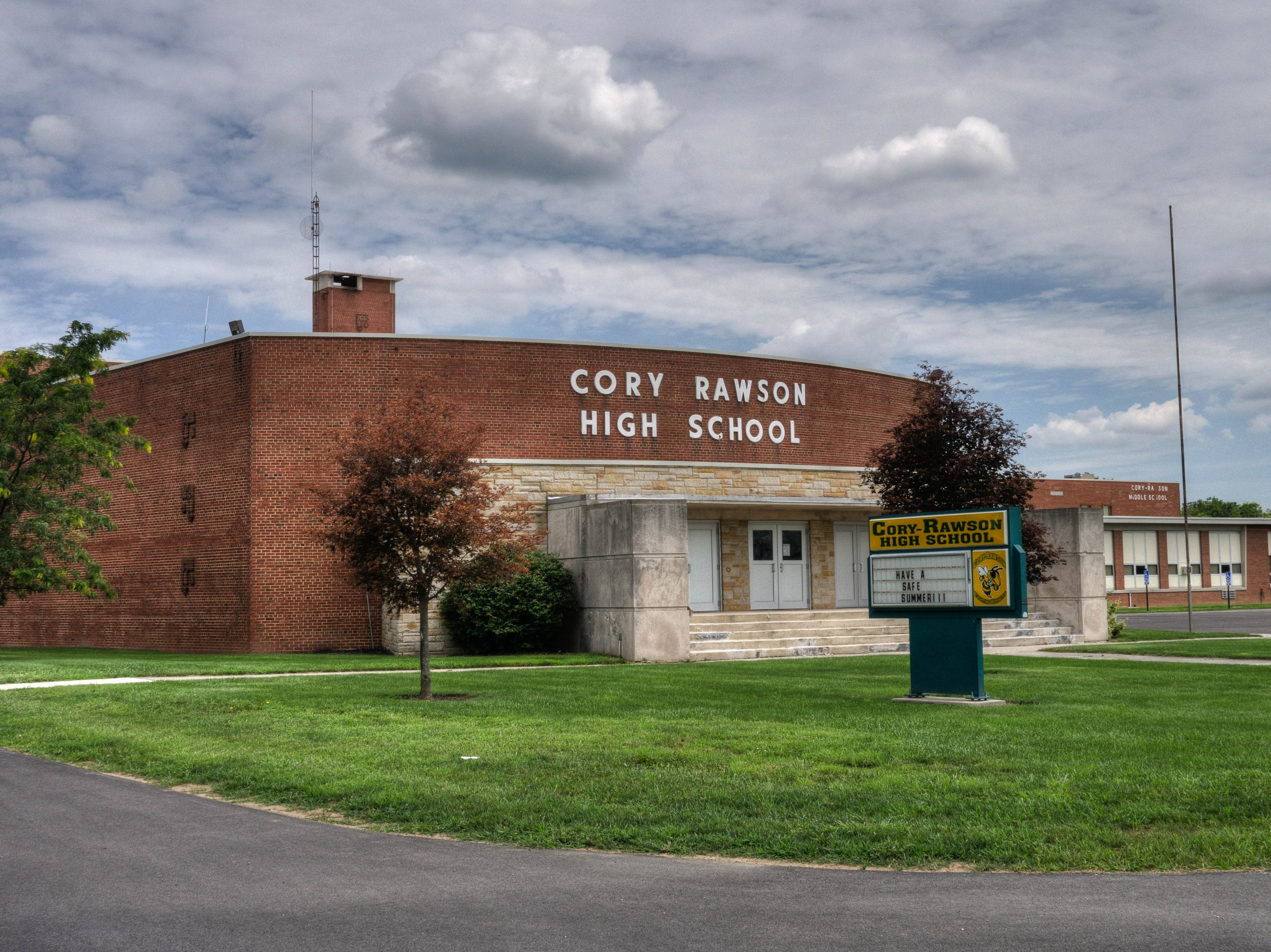

Location
- 3930 County Road 26; Rawson, Ohio 45881; United States; 40°56′15″N 83°48′19″W

Information
- Type: Public
- Established: 1949
- School district: Cory–Rawson Local School District
- NCES School ID: 390474302891
- Teaching staff: 15.50 (FTE)
- Grades: 7-12
- Enrollment: 265 (2024–25)
- Student to teacher ratio: 17.10
- Colors: Green and gold
- Athletics conference: Northwest Central Conference
- Team name: Hornets
- Accreditation: Ohio Department of Education
- Yearbook: The Hornet
- Website: www.cory-rawson.org

Cory–Rawson High School is a public junior high and high school in Rawson, Ohio. It serves students in grades seven through twelve and is the only junior high and high school in the Cory–Rawson Local School District. It is named for the villages of Mount Cory and Rawson. Athletic teams are known as the Hornets and the school colors are green and gold. They are a member of the Northwest Central Conference.

== State championships ==
- Girls track and field – 1997
