= Old Fort High School =

Location
- 7635 North County Road 51; Old Fort, Ohio 44861
- 41°14′05″N 83°08′56″W

Information
- Type: Public
- School district: Old Fort Local School District
- Principal: Erica Cobb
- Teaching staff: 20.62 (FTE)
- Grades: 7–12
- Student to teacher ratio: 14.74
- Colors: Brown and Gold
- Athletics conference: Northern 10 Athletic Conference
- Mascot: Stockader
- Website: http://www.old-fort.k12.oh.us

Old Fort High School is a public high school in Old Fort, Ohio. It is the only high school in the Old Fort Local School District. Their nickname is the Stockaders. They were long-time members of the Midland Athletic League but joined the Sandusky River League for the 2014–15 school year. Membership in the SRL ended in 2016 when that league (along with Old Fort) merged into the Sandusky Bay Conference for the 2016–17 school year. Membership in the SBC ended in 2026 when Old Fort joined the Northern 10 Athletic Conference for the 2026-27 school year.

== Absorption of Bettsville's school district ==
In January 2014, a community forum of 200+ people at the Bettsville school showed that a majority were in favor of letting their district be absorbed into the neighboring school district for Old Fort. This was mainly due to the increasingly large deficit the Bettsville school board was faced with, which was estimated to be around $775,000. The school district was also placed under fiscal emergency on February 6, 2014, by state auditor Dave Yost. Old Fort was decided as the best fit after approaching other neighboring districts because Bettsville and Old Fort already shared administration and staff. Bettsville's school became a much-needed K-6 building for Old Fort while the 7-12 students would attend Old Fort High School.

Other less popular options voted on were to keep Bettsville open, but make severe cuts to staff and extracurricular activities while asking for a levy to pass; or to allow the students to open-enroll at other districts and keep the building open solely to be cared for by a maintenance staff.

Bettsville's board of education approved the resolution to join under Old Fort, which was then approved by Old Fort's board. For the 2014–15 school year, Bettsville's district territory transferred to Old Fort's.

== Ohio High School Athletic Association State Championships ==
- Boys Baseball – 1968

== Notable alumni ==
- Paul Gillmor, politician
