= Attica, Ohio =

- Village
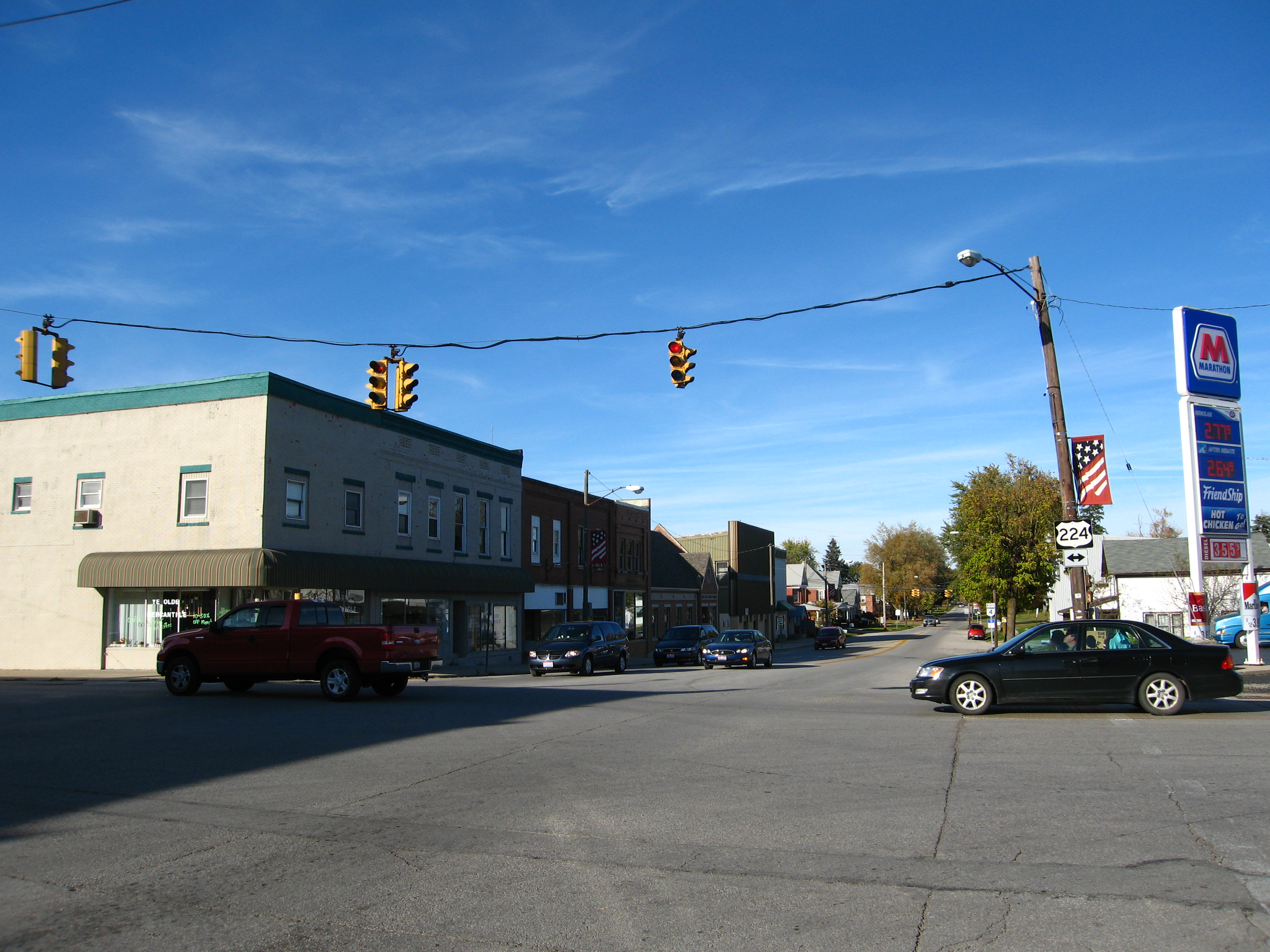
- Downtown viewed from South Main Street, looking toward the intersection of Ohio 4 and U.S. 224

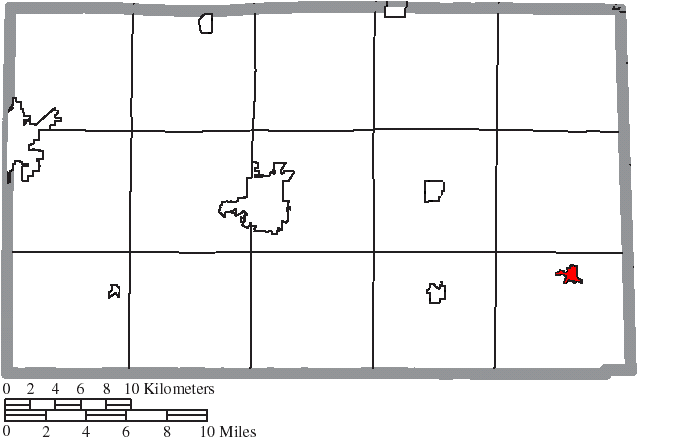
- Location of Attica in Seneca County

- Location within Ohio Location within the United States
- Coordinates: 41°03′49″N 82°53′14″W
- Country: United States
- State: Ohio
- County: Seneca
- Founded: 1833

Government
  - Type: Village council

Area
  - Total: 0.68 sq mi (1.75 km^{2})
  - Land: 0.67 sq mi (1.73 km^{2})
  - Water: 0.0077 sq mi (0.02 km^{2})
- Elevation: 948 ft (289 m)

Population (2020)
  - Total: 873
  - Estimate (2023): 868
  - Density: 1,309.0/sq mi (505.41/km^{2})
- Time zone: UTC-5 (Eastern (EST))
  - Summer (DST): UTC-4 (EDT)
- ZIP code: 44807
- Area code: 419
- FIPS code: 39-02820
- GNIS feature ID: 2398006
- Website: http://www.atticaohio.us/

Attica is a village in Seneca County, Ohio, United States. The population was 873 at the 2020 census.

Attica was designated a Tree City USA by the National Arbor Day Foundation.

== History ==
Attica was named after Attica, New York, the hometown of a pioneer settler.

One of the first women to die in World War I, Clara Ayres, is buried in the local cemetery. An Ohio Historical Marker has been placed in the cemetery to commemorate her.

== Geography ==
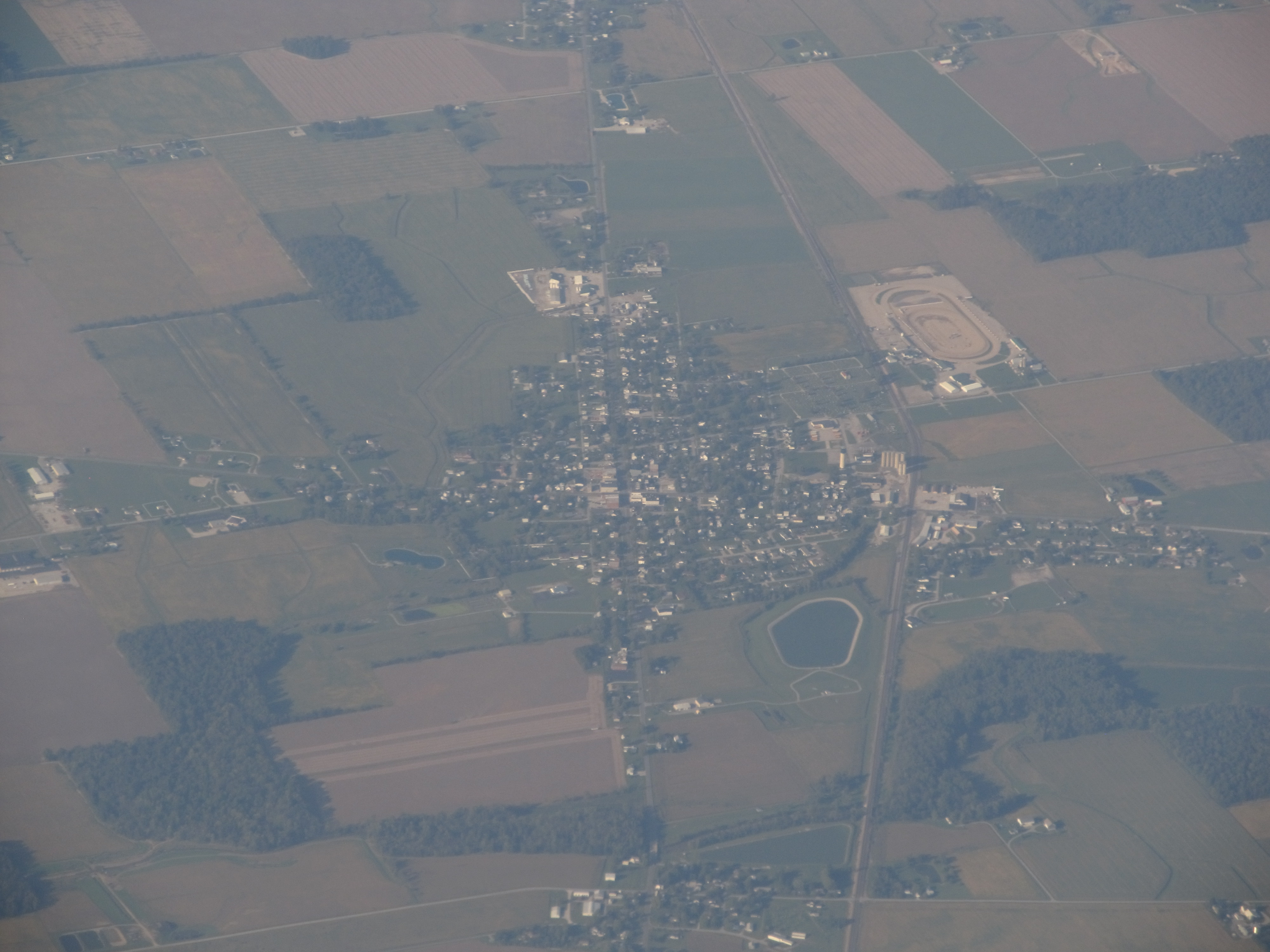
Aerial photo of Attica, 2012

According to the United States Census Bureau, the village has a total area of 0.67 square miles (1.74 km^{2}), of which 0.66 square miles (1.71 km^{2}) is land and 0.01 square miles (0.03 km^{2}) is water.

== Demographics ==
Historical population
Census	Pop.	Note	%±
1840	100		—
1870	370		—
1880	663		79.2%
1890	682		2.9%
1900	694		1.8%
1910	719		3.6%
1920	658		−8.5%
1930	783		19.0%
1940	780		−0.4%
1950	858		10.0%
1960	965		12.5%
1970	1,005		4.1%
1980	865		−13.9%
1990	944		9.1%
2000	955		1.2%
2010	899		−5.9%
2020	873		−2.9%
2023 (est.)	868	▼	−0.6%
U.S. Decennial Census

=== 2010 census ===
As of the census of 2010, there were 899 people, 364 households, and 266 families living in the village. The population density was 1,362.1 inhabitants per square mile (525.9/km^{2}). There were 428 housing units at an average density of 648.5 per square mile (250.4/km^{2}). The racial makeup of the village was 96.3% White, 0.8% African American, 0.2% from other races, and 2.7% from two or more races. Hispanic or Latino of any race were 1.3% of the population.

There were 364 households, of which 33.8% had children under the age of 18 living with them, 54.9% were married couples living together, 15.1% had a female householder with no husband present, 3.0% had a male householder with no wife present, and 26.9% were non-families. 25.0% of all households were made up of individuals, and 12.1% had someone living alone who was 65 years of age or older. The average household size was 2.47 and the average family size was 2.88.

The median age in the village was 39.8 years. 25.6% of residents were under the age of 18; 7.8% were between the ages of 18 and 24; 22% were from 25 to 44; 27.1% were from 45 to 64; and 17.5% were 65 years of age or older. The gender makeup of the village was 48.8% male and 51.2% female.

=== 2000 census ===
As of the census of 2000, there were 955 people, 393 households, and 277 families living in the village. The population density was 1,783.4 inhabitants per square mile (688.6/km^{2}). There were 430 housing units at an average density of 803.0 per square mile (310.0/km^{2}). The racial makeup of the village was 98.95% White, 0.21% Native American, 0.10% from other races, and 0.73% from two or more races. Hispanic or Latino of any race were 0.42% of the population.

There were 393 households, out of which 29.3% had children under the age of 18 living with them, 57.8% were married couples living together, 10.2% had a female householder with no husband present, and 29.5% were non-families. 25.4% of all households were made up of individuals, and 10.9% had someone living alone who was 65 years of age or older. The average household size was 2.43 and the average family size was 2.91.

In the village, the population was spread out, with 23.8% under the age of 18, 9.1% from 18 to 24, 27.0% from 25 to 44, 23.8% from 45 to 64, and 16.3% who were 65 years of age or older. The median age was 38 years. For every 100 females there were 89.5 males. For every 100 females age 18 and over, there were 91.6 males.

The median income for a household in the village was $38,529, and the median income for a family was $44,408. Males had a median income of $37,833 versus $22,969 for females. The per capita income for the village was $17,942. About 8.6% of families and 9.8% of the population were below the poverty line, including 9.4% of those under age 18 and 6.3% of those age 65 or over.

== Education ==
Attica is in the Seneca East Local School District, which includes Seneca East High School. Until consolidation with Republic into Seneca East, the village was served by the Attica School District.

== Notable people ==
- Homer W. Kiefer, US Army major general, born in Attica
