= Seneca East High School =

Location
- 13343 E US 224; Attica, Ohio 44807; United States; 41°04′44″N 82°54′56″W

Information
- Type: Public
- Motto: "Bettering the best"
- School district: Seneca East Local School
- Superintendent: David Danhoff
- Teaching staff: 19.10 (FTE)
- Grades: K-12
- Student to teacher ratio: 15.18
- Colors: Orange and Black and White
- Athletics: Doug Mason Athletic Director
- Athletics conference: Northern 10 Athletic Conference
- Mascot: Tigers
- Newspaper: Tiger Tales
- Website: https://www.se-tigers.com/

Seneca East High School is a public high school in Attica, Ohio. It is the only high school in the Seneca East Local School District. On December 1, 2011, Carey, Mohawk, and Seneca East announced they would be leaving the MAL to help form the new Northern 10 Athletic Conference in 2014 with Bucyrus, Buckeye Central, Colonel Crawford, Crestline, Riverdale, Wynford and Ridgedale. (The Northern 10 only consist of 8 teams, starting in 2021 sports seasons, with Ridgedale & Riverdale leaving the league in 2020.)

== Ohio High School Athletic Association State Championships ==
- Girls Cross Country – 1998
- Boys Cross Country - 2012
