= Lakota High School (Kansas, Ohio) =

Coordinates: 41°16′22″N 83°19′34″W

- 5186 County Road 13; Kansas, Ohio 44841

Information
- Type: Public
- School district: Lakota Local Schools
- Principal: Sherry Sprow
- Grades: 9–12
- Enrollment: 285 (2023–2024)
- Colors: Navy and White
- Athletics conference: Sandusky Bay Conference
- Mascot: Raider
- Website: web.vscc.k12.oh.us/mod/resource/view.php?id=1036

Lakota High School is a public high school in Scott Township, near Kansas, Ohio. It is the only high school in the Lakota Local Schools district. Their nickname is the Raiders. Lakota opened the doors on their new K–12 building to students on August 29, 2011. They are members of the Sandusky Bay Conference beginning in 2016. They had been members of the Sandusky River League from 2014 to 2016, the Midland Athletic League from 2009 to 2014, and the Suburban Lakes League from 1972 to 2009.

== Ohio High School Athletic Association State Championships ==
- Boys Cross Country – 1970
- Girls Track and Field – 1987
