= Calvert High School (Ohio) =

Private Catholic school in Tiffin, Ohio, United States

Location
- 152 Madison Street; Tiffin, Ohio 44883; United States; 41°6′49″N 83°10′28″W

Information
- Type: Private, coeducational
- Religious affiliation: Roman Catholic
- Established: 1923
- Principal: Megan Schultz (Academy & High School), Marilyn Seislove (Elementary)
- Head teacher: Jeremy Marinis
- Chaplain: Father Matt Rader
- Grades: Pre-K–12
- Colors: Royal blue and white
- Athletics conference: Northern 10 Athletic Conference
- Team name: Senecas
- Website: calvertcatholic.org

Calvert High School is a private, Catholic high school in Tiffin, Ohio. It is part of the Roman Catholic Diocese of Toledo. Athletic teams are known as the Senecas.

== Calvert Catholic Schools structure ==
Since the 2021 school year, grades preschool through fifth have met at the Calvert Elementary Campus, while the academy and Calvert High School houses students in grades six through twelve. Calvert Catholic High School is a faith-based program. With having a mass once a week with extra services throughout the year. They allow the students to participate in the S.E.A. program, STEAM program, Advanced Placement courses, Sentinel Career and Vocational School, and the College Credit Plus program. Calvert offers students interested in attending to schedule a tour, or have a shadow day where they get the full experience of how a day at Calvert goes.

== State championships ==
- Girls Volleyball – 2018, 2020, 2025, 2026
- Boys Football – 1980 and 1981
- Boys Golf – 1976
