= Bascom, Ohio =

- Census-designated place
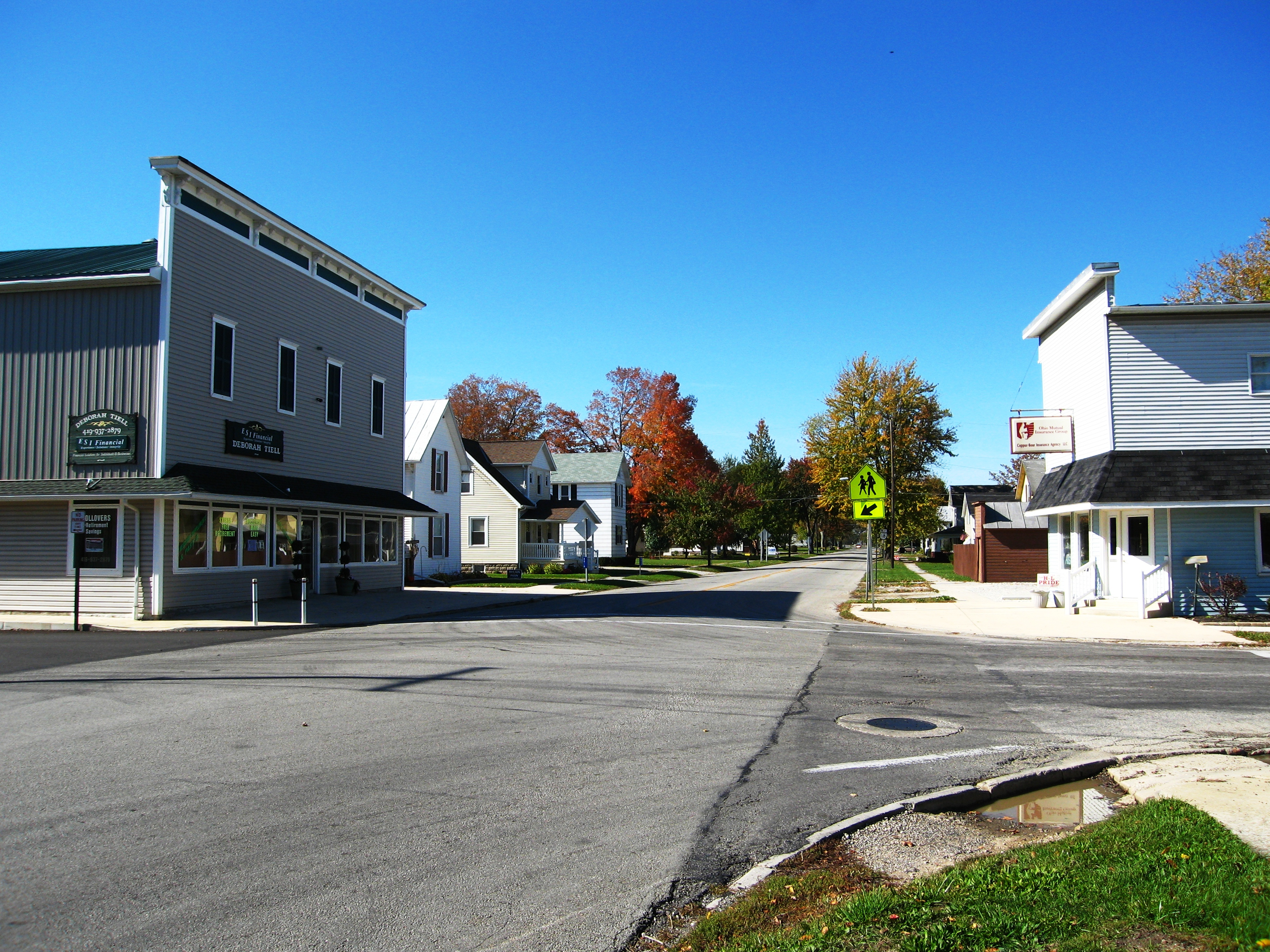
- Running concurrently with Ohio State Route 18, Tiffin Street bisects Bascom.

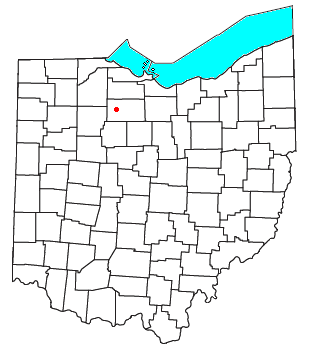
- Location of Bascom
- Coordinates: 41°07′35″N 83°17′08″W
- Country: United States
- State: Ohio
- County: Seneca

Area
  - Total: 1.51 sq mi (3.92 km^{2})
  - Land: 1.51 sq mi (3.92 km^{2})
  - Water: 0 sq mi (0.00 km^{2})
- Elevation: 768 ft (234 m)

Population (2020)
  - Total: 397
  - Density: 262.1/sq mi (101.21/km^{2})
- Time zone: UTC-5 (Eastern (EST))
  - Summer (DST): UTC-4 (EDT)
- ZIP code: 44809
- Area code: 419
- GNIS feature ID: 2628862

Bascom (/ˈbæskəm/ BAS-kəm) is a census-designated place in western Hopewell Township, Seneca County, Ohio. It has a post office with the ZIP code 44809 and hosts Hopewell-Loudon High School. The community is located at the intersection of State Routes 18 and 635 east of Fostoria. The population was 397 at the 2020 census.

== History ==
Bascom was laid out in 1837. The community derives its name from Scott & Bascom, publishers of The Ohio State Journal. A post office called Bascom has been in operation since 1850.

== Demographics ==
Historical population
Census	Pop.	Note	%±
2020	397		—
U.S. Decennial Census
