= Tiffin, Ohio =

- City
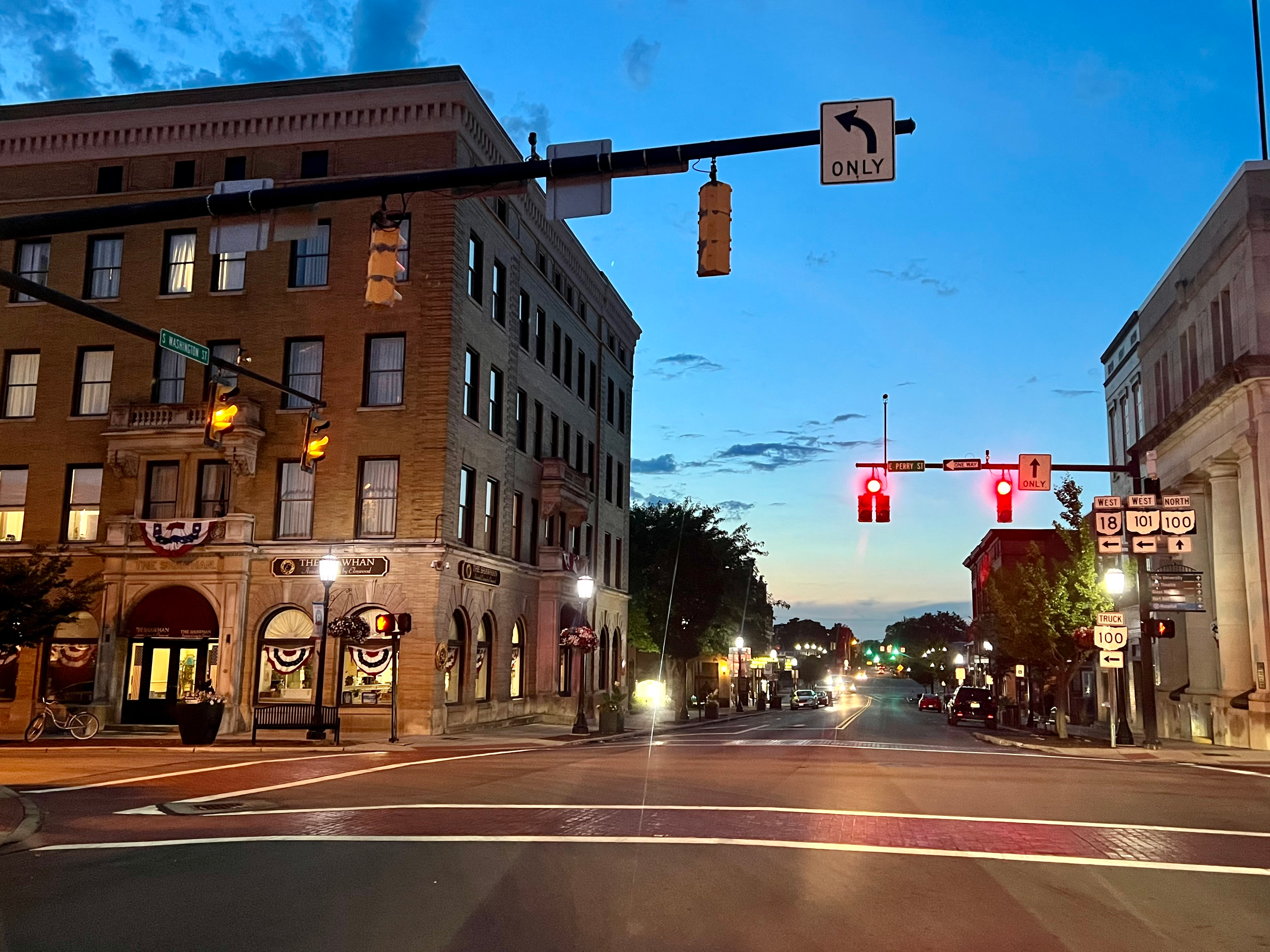
- Downtown Tiffin as seen from the intersection of S. Washington St. and E. Perry St.
- Nickname: T-Town
- Motto: The Education Community
- Interactive map of Tiffin, Ohio
- Location within Ohio Location within the United States
- Coordinates: 41°07′28″N 83°10′35″W
- Country: United States
- State: Ohio
- County: Seneca
- Incorporated: 1812
- Named for: Edward Tiffin

Government
  - Type: Mayor-council
  - Mayor: Lee Wilkinson (I)
  - City Administrator: Nick Dutro
  - City Council: Bridget Boyle (President); Aaron W. Jones (1st Ward); Scott D. Hoernemann (2nd Ward); Kevin Roessner (3rd Ward); Dennis A. Snay (4th Ward); Kyle Daugherty (at-large); Cheyane Thacker (at-large); John Hays (at-large)

Area
  - Total: 7.37 sq mi (19.09 km^{2})
  - Land: 7.23 sq mi (18.73 km^{2})
  - Water: 0.14 sq mi (0.36 km^{2})
- Elevation: 722 ft (220 m)

Population (2020)
  - Total: 17,953
  - Density: 2,481.9/sq mi (958.27/km^{2})
- Time zone: UTC-5 (Eastern (EST))
  - Summer (DST): UTC-4 (EDT)
- ZIP code: 44883
- Area codes: 419, 567
- FIPS code: 39-76778
- GNIS feature ID: 1086956
- Website: https://tiffinohio.gov/

Tiffin is a city in Seneca County, Ohio, United States, and its county seat. Developed along the Sandusky River, Tiffin is located about 55 miles (89 km) southeast of Toledo. The population was 17,953 at the 2020 census.

It is the home of Heidelberg University and Tiffin University. At one time the city was noted as a glass and porcelain manufacturing center. The National Arbor Day Foundation has designated Tiffin as a Tree City USA.

== History ==
The bronze statue of "The Indian Maiden" on Frost Parkway near Miami Street, marks the site of Fort Ball, a military depot of the War of 1812. During a fighting engagement of that war, Erastus Bowe sighted the location where Tiffin later developed. In 1817, he returned to the site and built the Pan Yan Tavern on the North Sandusky River. Its name was likely derived from Penn Yan, New York. Early homesteaders followed soon after Bowe, and the settlement of Oakley sprang up around the Pan Yan on the north side of the river. The chief road of the area followed the path of the stagecoaches through Oakley, which was called Fort Ball after 1824.

In 1821, Josiah Hedges purchased a piece of land on the south bank of the river opposite Oakley and founded another settlement. He named this village in honor of Edward Tiffin, first governor of Ohio and later a member of the United States Senate who had helped gain statehood for the Ohio Territory in 1803. Tiffin was incorporated by an act of the Ohio Legislature on March 7, 1835. In March 1850, Fort Ball was absorbed by Tiffin.

In 1824, with the establishment of Seneca County by the Ohio Legislature, Tiffin was designated as the county seat. The county was named after the Seneca people, the westernmost of the Iroquois League of Six Nations who dominated the territory for centuries.

The discovery of natural gas in the vicinity in 1888 gave new momentum to the city's industrial development. Various companies were founded in or moved to the city during this period, including Webster Industries, Inc., American Standard Companies, Tiffin Glass Works, and the Hanson Clutch and Machinery Company. Now known as Tiffin Parts, it has been operating at the same site since the 1920s and is listed on the National Register of Historic Places.

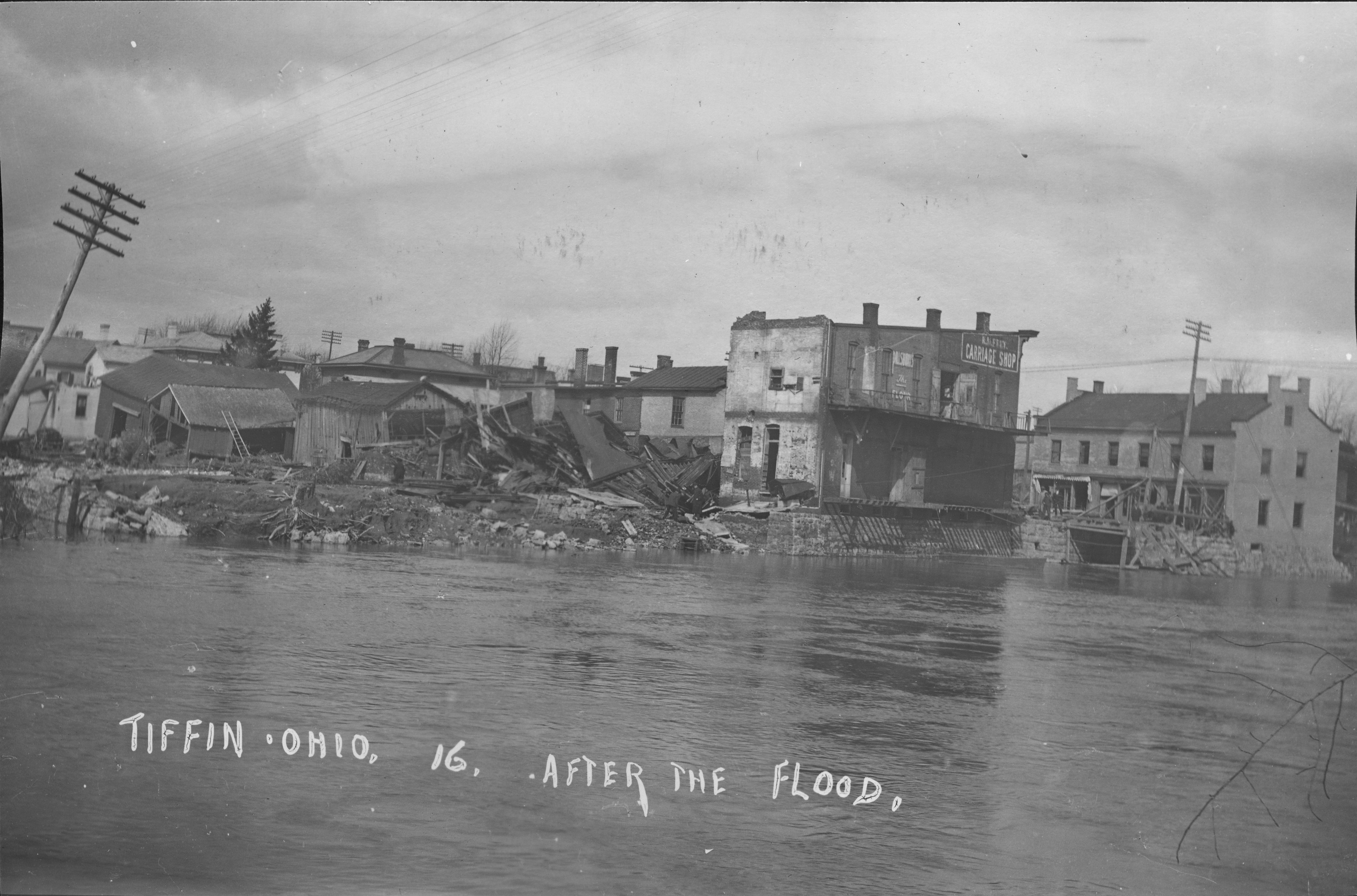
Damaged buildings resulting from the Great Flood of 1913

In the spring of 1913, the Upper Mississippi and Ohio River valleys were ravaged by Great Flood of 1913. During a three-day period, Tiffin sustained more than $1,000,000 in property loss, with 46 houses and 2 factories swept away, 10 factories damaged, 69 places of business heavily damaged, 6 bridges within the corporate limits destroyed, and 19 deaths.

Ballreich's Bros., a potato chip company, has operated in Tiffin since 1920. While the company's retail market is Northern Ohio, its products have a reputation that extends beyond its local retail market; these are available for shipping anywhere via the company's website. The company was acquired by a group of local investors in 2019.

In 1884, Tiffin St. Paul's United Methodist Church was the first church in the world to be lit by Thomas Edison's light bulbs, and the second public building in the United States to be wired for electricity, preceded by the Edison Hotel in Sunbury, Pennsylvania in 1883.

Tiffin is the home of the historic Ritz Theatre, built in 1928 as a vaudeville house; it is in the Italian Renaissance style. The Ritz Theatre received extensive renovation and restoration in 1998.

On November 10, 2002, an F3 tornado hit southeast Tiffin, destroying several homes outside city limits. A new Mercy Hospital of Tiffin was built and opened in July 2008.

In 2022, Tiffin City Council elected the city's first female mayor, Dawn Iannantuono, a Democrat, following the resignation of former Mayor Aaron Montz, a Republican. Iannantuono, who previously served on Tiffin City Council and the Tiffin City Board of Education, was the 50th mayor of the City of Tiffin. She decided not to seek another term as mayor, and was succeeded by small business owner and former educator Lee Wilkinson, also a Democrat, who defeated Republican John Spahr in the 2023 general election.

As of 2023, the estimated population of Tiffin is 17,706 people.

== Geography ==
According to the United States Census Bureau, the city has a total area of 6.90 square miles (17.87 km^{2}), of which 6.76 square miles (17.51 km^{2}) is land and 0.14 square miles (0.36 km^{2}) is water. The Sandusky River flows through the center of the city. It is located on U.S. Route 224.

=== Climate ===
Climate data for Tiffin, Ohio, 1991–2020 normals, extremes 1893–2011
Month	Jan	Feb	Mar	Apr	May	Jun	Jul	Aug	Sep	Oct	Nov	Dec	Year
Record high °F (°C)	73 (23)	74 (23)	83 (28)	90 (32)	95 (35)	105 (41)	106 (41)	105 (41)	100 (38)	91 (33)	82 (28)	72 (22)	106 (41)
Mean maximum °F (°C)	54.6 (12.6)	59.2 (15.1)	71.5 (21.9)	81.6 (27.6)	86.6 (30.3)	92.7 (33.7)	93.8 (34.3)	92.7 (33.7)	89.4 (31.9)	81.7 (27.6)	69.6 (20.9)	57.5 (14.2)	95.3 (35.2)
Mean daily maximum °F (°C)	33.3 (0.7)	36.4 (2.4)	46.5 (8.1)	60.0 (15.6)	71.5 (21.9)	80.5 (26.9)	83.9 (28.8)	82.5 (28.1)	76.7 (24.8)	63.8 (17.7)	49.7 (9.8)	38.2 (3.4)	60.3 (15.7)
Daily mean °F (°C)	26.0 (−3.3)	28.4 (−2.0)	37.6 (3.1)	49.4 (9.7)	61.0 (16.1)	70.2 (21.2)	73.7 (23.2)	72.1 (22.3)	65.5 (18.6)	53.3 (11.8)	41.5 (5.3)	31.3 (−0.4)	50.8 (10.5)
Mean daily minimum °F (°C)	18.7 (−7.4)	20.5 (−6.4)	28.8 (−1.8)	38.7 (3.7)	50.4 (10.2)	59.9 (15.5)	63.6 (17.6)	61.8 (16.6)	54.3 (12.4)	42.9 (6.1)	33.4 (0.8)	24.5 (−4.2)	41.5 (5.3)
Mean minimum °F (°C)	−2.5 (−19.2)	2.5 (−16.4)	11.9 (−11.2)	24.1 (−4.4)	35.4 (1.9)	44.8 (7.1)	50.9 (10.5)	49.3 (9.6)	39.3 (4.1)	28.3 (−2.1)	19.7 (−6.8)	4.3 (−15.4)	−6.6 (−21.4)
Record low °F (°C)	−21 (−29)	−20 (−29)	−12 (−24)	6 (−14)	27 (−3)	35 (2)	43 (6)	36 (2)	29 (−2)	19 (−7)	0 (−18)	−18 (−28)	−21 (−29)
Average precipitation inches (mm)	2.57 (65)	2.24 (57)	2.73 (69)	3.82 (97)	4.10 (104)	4.20 (107)	3.91 (99)	3.54 (90)	3.32 (84)	2.76 (70)	2.89 (73)	2.61 (66)	38.69 (981)
Average snowfall inches (cm)	9.4 (24)	6.8 (17)	4.9 (12)	0.6 (1.5)	0.0 (0.0)	0.0 (0.0)	0.0 (0.0)	0.0 (0.0)	0.0 (0.0)	0.0 (0.0)	0.9 (2.3)	6.9 (18)	29.5 (74.8)
Average precipitation days (≥ 0.01 in)	12.1	9.6	10.8	13.2	12.8	11.4	10.9	8.4	9.2	10.2	10.2	11.3	130.1
Average snowy days (≥ 0.1 in)	5.8	4.3	2.8	0.3	0.0	0.0	0.0	0.0	0.0	0.0	0.8	4.0	18.0
Source 1: NOAA
Source 2: National Weather Service (mean maxima/minima 1981–2010)

== Demographics ==
Historical population
Census	Pop.	Note	%±
1830	248		—
1840	823		231.9%
1850	2,718		230.3%
1860	3,992		46.9%
1870	5,648		41.5%
1880	7,879		39.5%
1890	10,801		37.1%
1900	10,989		1.7%
1910	11,894		8.2%
1920	14,375		20.9%
1930	16,428		14.3%
1940	16,102		−2.0%
1950	18,952		17.7%
1960	21,478		13.3%
1970	21,596		0.5%
1980	19,567		−9.4%
1990	18,604		−4.9%
2000	18,135		−2.5%
2010	17,963		−0.9%
2020	17,953		−0.1%
2025 (est.)	17,803		−0.8%

=== 2020 census ===
As of the 2020 census, Tiffin had a population of 17,953, a population density of 2,561.05 inhabitants per square mile (988.8/km^{2}), and a median age of 35.8 years. 4.3% of residents were under the age of 5, 19.7% were under the age of 18, and 18.9% were 65 years of age or older. For every 100 females there were 96.9 males, and for every 100 females age 18 and over there were 94.5 males age 18 and over.

99.8% of residents lived in urban areas, while 0.2% lived in rural areas.

There were 7,378 households in Tiffin, of which 25.0% had children under the age of 18 living in them. Of all households, 36.9% were married-couple households, 22.4% were households with a male householder and no spouse or partner present, and 31.7% were households with a female householder and no spouse or partner present. About 37.7% of all households were made up of individuals and 16.8% had someone living alone who was 65 years of age or older.

There were 8,127 housing units, of which 9.2% were vacant. The homeowner vacancy rate was 1.5% and the rental vacancy rate was 7.2%.

Racial composition as of the 2020 census
Race	Number	Percent
White	15,939	88.8%
Black or African American	571	3.2%
American Indian and Alaska Native	41	0.2%
Asian	235	1.3%
Native Hawaiian and Other Pacific Islander	21	0.1%
Some other race	185	1.0%
Two or more races	961	5.4%
Hispanic or Latino (of any race)	761	4.2%

=== 2010 census ===
As of the census of 2010, there were 17,963 people, 7,086 households, and 4,115 families residing in the city. The population density was 2,657.2 inhabitants per square mile (1,026.0/km^{2}). There were 8,007 housing units at an average density of 1,184.5 per square mile (457.3/km^{2}). The racial makeup of the city was 93.9% White, 2.6% African American, 0.2% Native American, 1.0% Asian, 0.7% from other races, and 1.6% from two or more races. Hispanic or Latino of any race were 3.1% of the population.

There were 7,086 households, of which 27.4% had children under the age of 18 living with them, 41.0% were married couples living together, 12.2% had a female householder with no husband present, 4.9% had a male householder with no wife present, and 41.9% were non-families. 34.3% of all households were made up of individuals, and 15.4% had someone living alone who was 65 years of age or older. The average household size was 2.29 and the average family size was 2.91.

The median age in the city was 35.2 years. 20.7% of residents were under the age of 18; 17.4% were between the ages of 18 and 24; 21.5% were from 25 to 44; 24.6% were from 45 to 64; and 15.8% were 65 years of age or older. The gender makeup of the city was 48.9% male and 51.1% female.

=== 2000 census ===
As of the census of 2000, there were 18,135 people, 11,330 households, and 9,471 families residing in the city. The population density was (10,792.4/mi^{2}) people per square mile (11,078.9/km^{2}). There were 17,862 housing units at an average density of 11,210.6 per square mile (4,328.4/km^{2}). The racial makeup of the city was 96.3% White, 1.5% African American, 0.2% Native American, 0.5% Asian, 0.0% Pacific Islander, 0.6% from other races, and 1.00% from two or more races. Hispanic or Latino of any race were 2.1% of the population.

There were 11,330 households, out of which 32.4% had children under the age of 18 living with them, 46.2% were married couples living together, 11.1% had a female householder with no husband present, and 39.0% were non-families. 32.6% of all households were made up of individuals, and 14.0% had someone living alone who was 65 years of age or older. The average household size was 2.31 and the average family size was 2.92.

In the city the population was spread out, with 22.3% under the age of 18, 15.1% from 18 to 24, 25.9% from 25 to 44, 20.9% from 45 to 64, and 15.8% who were 65 years of age or older. The median age was 36 years. For every 100 females, there were 95.7 males. For every 100 females age 18 and over, there were 92.6 males.

The median income for a household in the city was $33,261, and the median income for a family was $41,329. Males had a median income of $31,207 versus $22,259 for females. The per capita income for the city was $16,580. About 5.7% of families and about 11.1% of the population were below the poverty line, including 9.4% of those under age 18 and 8.9% of those age 65 or over.

== Sports ==
The Tiffin Saints were part of the Independent Baseball League that played an abbreviated single season at the Heidelberg University baseball field in 2014. The Saints were Tiffin's first "professional" baseball team since the Tiffin Mud Hens played in the Ohio State League from 1936 to 1941. The Tiffin Mud Hens won the OSL championship in 1936.

The Saints and IBL, which initially began with six teams, folded before the end of the inaugural season due to financial woes and controversy over whether or not the players were paid. The Adrian Pioneers beat the Ohio Travelers to win the shortened IBL season.

== Education ==
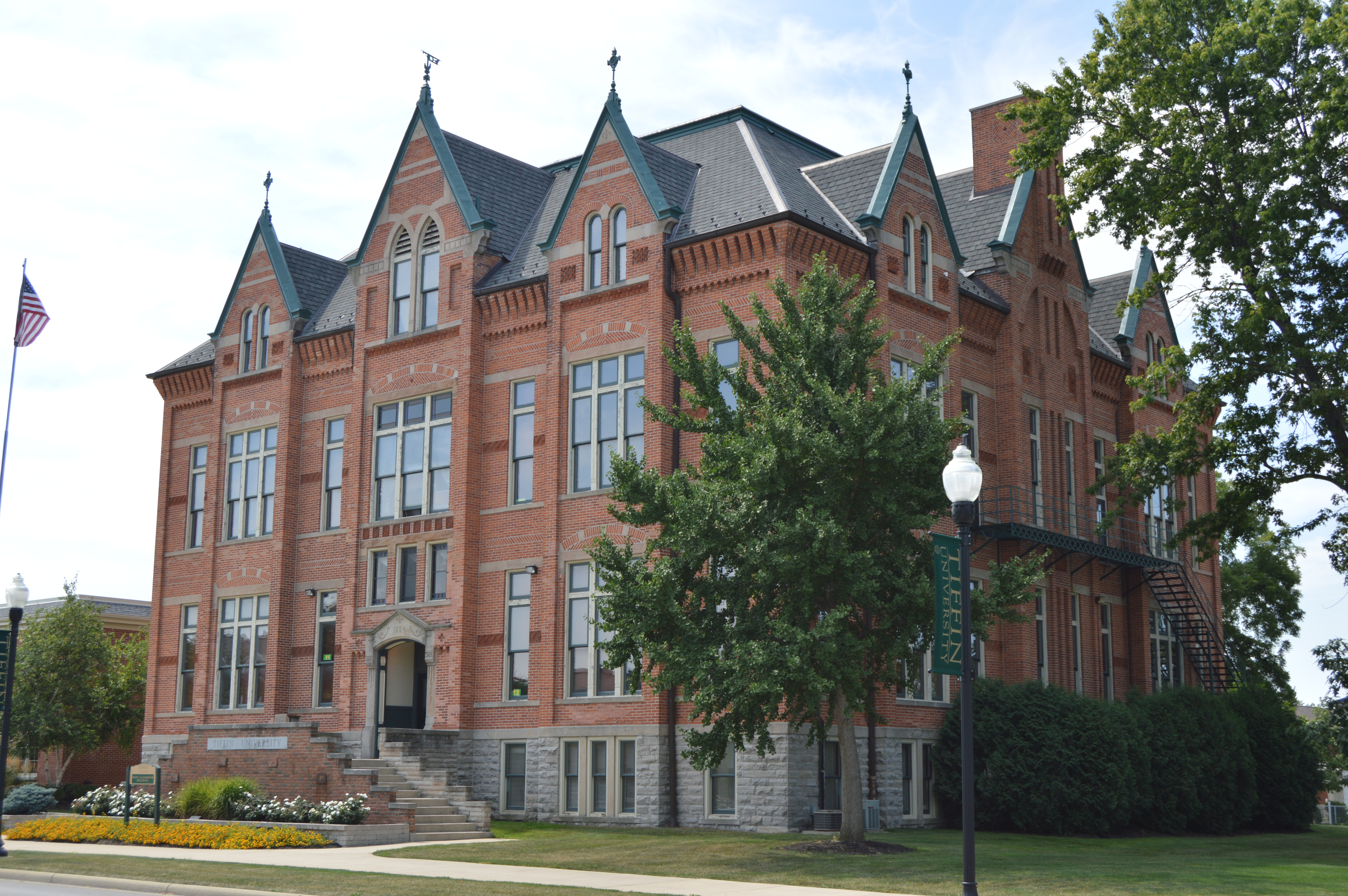
The Main Classroom Building at Tiffin University

Tiffin is served by the public Tiffin City School District, which includes Columbian High School, Tiffin Middle School, and C.A. Krout, Noble, and Washington elementary schools. Tiffin is also served by the Calvert Catholic Schools: Calvert High School for grades 7-12, and one campus school, Calvert Elementary, for preschool through grade 6. Other primary and secondary schools in Tiffin include the Sentinel Career Center, one of two charters schools, Bridges Community Academy, and North Central Academy.

In the mid-to-late 19th century, two universities had been founded in the city, Heidelberg University in 1850, and Tiffin University in 1888 (which was originally a subdivision of Heidelberg University until 1917). Both are currently private universities. It is also home to the Tiffin Academy of Hair Design, Vanguard Sentinel Career and Technology Center( a vocational school), and formerly of the American Institute of Massotherapy.

Tiffin holds the Tiffin-Seneca Public Library which in 2021 had 11,138 registered borrowers.

== Media ==
Tiffin is served by The Advertiser-Tribune as its primary print newspaper, and TiffinOhio.net as its primary online news website. The city has 4 radio stations, 1600 WTTF AM, 103.7 WCKY-FM, 103.3 WSJG-LP "St. John Paul The Great Radio". and 93.3 COOL FM. It is also served by its local news/sport/entertainment channel, WTIF (Channel 21 on Cable, and currently not carried by DirecTV or Dish Network).

== Transportation ==
Tiffin has one airport, Seneca County Airport (K16G). A flex-route bus service, the Shelton Shuttle, is provided by Seneca-Crawford Area Transportation, riders must wait at designated bus stops to ride. Tiffin is also served by Tiffin Service Cab and Midwest-Runners, two on-demand transportation services.

Tiffin is currently on 5 state routes, as well as U.S. Route 224, which skirts the city's southern edge. Tiffin is located on the southern terminus of Northern Ohio and Western Railway. CSX operates a busy line that travels east and west through the city. The city is still a very busy railhub for CSX because of its closeness to CSX's Willard Yard and the "Iron Triangle" in Fostoria.

== Notable people ==
- Oliver Edwin Baker, president of the Association of American Geographers
- George H. Brickner, politician and businessman
- Oliver Cowdery, early leader in the Latter Day Saint movement. Practiced law and politics in Tiffin, 1842–1847
- George Babcock Cressey, geographer and geologist
- Charles W. Foster, 40th Secretary of the Treasury, 35th Governor of Ohio.
- William Harvey Gibson, Union General, Civil War, and noted 19th century orator
- Lorenzo D. Gasser, U.S. Army major general
- Paul Gillmor, Republican U.S. representative representing the Ohio 5th District from 1988 to 2007.
- John R. Goodin, U.S. Representative from Kansas
- Bill Groman, professional football player in the American Football League (AFL)
- Jay Gruden, former head coach of the Washington Football Team of the NFL
- Katrina Hertzer, Chief Nurse, U. S. Navy Nurse Corps, during World War I
- Sue Myrick, U.S. Representative from North Carolina and former mayor of Charlotte, North Carolina.
- John Quinn, Tiffin native, lawyer, art patron, collector of historical manuscripts, and major supporter of William Butler Yeats.
- George E. Seney, U.S. Representative from Ohio
- Rodger Wilton Young, Medal of Honor recipient, World War II
