= New Riegel High School =

Location
- 44 North Perry Street; New Riegel, Ohio 44853
- 41°03′23″N 83°19′09″W

Information
- Type: Public
- School district: New Riegel Local Schools
- Principal: Valerie Zeno
- Grades: 7-12
- Colors: Navy and Vegas Gold
- Athletics conference: Northern 10 Athletic Conference
- Mascot: Blue Jacket
- Newspaper: The Anchor

New Riegel High School is a public high school in New Riegel, Ohio. It is the only high school in the New Riegel Local Schools district. The school's athletic teams use the nickname Blue Jackets. They are members of the Northern 10 Athletic Conference.

== Ohio High School Athletic Association State Championships ==
- Boys Baseball – 1969
