= Hopewell-Loudon High School =

Location
- 290 North County Road 7 Bascom, Ohio 44809; United States
- 41.127955°N 83.286434°W

Information
- Type: Public
- School district: Hopewell-Loudon Local Schools
- Teaching staff: 15.80 (FTE)
- Grades: 7-12
- Enrollment: 358 (2023–2024)
- Student to teacher ratio: 22.66
- Colors: Scarlet and Gray
- Athletics conference: Northern 10 Athletic Conference
- Mascot: Chieftains
- Website: www.hlschool.org

Hopewell-Loudon High School is a public k-12 school in Bascom, Ohio. It is the only high school in the Hopewell-Loudon Local Schools district. Their mascot name is the Chieftains.

The school primarily serves residents of Hopewell Township and Loudon Township in Seneca County. Bascom is located between Tiffin, Ohio and Fostoria, Ohio. The current school building opened in 2013 and houses kindergarten through 12th grade.

== Ohio Music Education Association State Appearance ==
In 2016, the Hopewell-Loudon Chieftain Concert Band, under direction of Mr. Jess Nelson, earned a "I" rating at the OMEA District 2 Competition at Oak Harbor middle school, allowing the band to go to OMEA State level competition for what is presumably the first time in school history. The band performed at Gahanna Lincoln High School in Columbus, and received a "II" rating at the state level.

== Ohio High School Athletic Association State Championships ==
- Girls Volleyball – 1997, 1998, 1999, 2000, 2001
- Girls Basketball – 1999
