= Old Fort, Ohio =

- Census-designated place
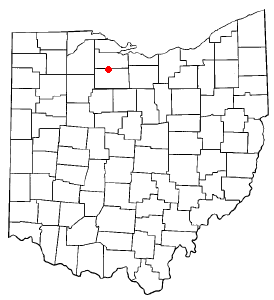
- Location of Old Fort, Ohio
- Coordinates: 41°14′31″N 83°09′05″W
- Country: United States
- State: Ohio
- County: Seneca
- Township: Pleasant

Area
  - Total: 0.58 sq mi (1.50 km^{2})
  - Land: 0.58 sq mi (1.50 km^{2})
  - Water: 0 sq mi (0.00 km^{2})
- Elevation: 686 ft (209 m)

Population (2020)
  - Total: 143
  - Density: 247.6/sq mi (95.61/km^{2})
- Time zone: UTC-5 (Eastern (EST))
  - Summer (DST): UTC-4 (EDT)
- ZIP codes: 44861
- FIPS code: 39-58156
- GNIS feature ID: 2628948

Old Fort is a census-designated place located in northern Pleasant Township, Seneca County, Ohio, United States; located about a mile east of Ohio State Route 53 where N. Township Rd. 73 intersects with E. County Rd. 51. The ZIP code is 44861. The population was 143 at the 2020 census.

== History ==
Old Fort was platted in 1882, and named after Fort Seneca, a fort built during the War of 1812. A post office has been in operation at Old Fort since 1882.

== Geography ==
Old Fort sits adjacent to the Sandusky River, which is a tributary to Lake Erie.

== Demographics ==
Historical population
Census	Pop.	Note	%±
2020	143		—
U.S. Decennial Census

== Notable people ==
- Paul Gillmor, Republican U.S. representative representing the Ohio 5th District from 1988 to 2007.
