= Toledo Area Athletic Conference =

League sponsors

The Toledo Area Athletic Conference (TAAC) is a high school athletic conference located in northwest Ohio, with member schools in Lucas County. It was formed in 1988, and the league sponsors cross country, volleyball, golf, basketball, wrestling, baseball, softball, and track & field.

== Membership ==
=== Current full members ===
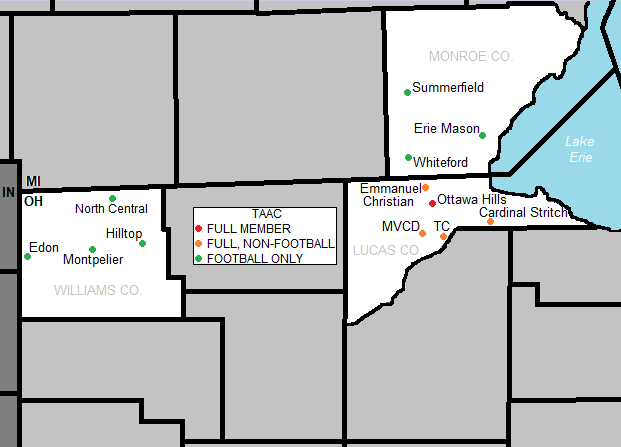
Map of the TAAC's members for the 2025-2026 school year. Ottawa Hills and all the football-only members have since left the conference

School	Nickname	Location	Colors	Joined
Cardinal Stritch Catholic (Note: Cardinal Stritch High School will close in December 2026)	Cardinals	Oregon	Red, Black	1995
Emmanuel Christian (Note: Emmanuel Christian and Maumee Valley currently do not have football teams.)	Warriors	Toledo	Green, White	1988
Maumee Valley Country Day	Hawks	Toledo	Navy, White	1988
Toledo Christian (Note: Toledo Christian is an independent for football in 2025 and 2026, and will join the Sandusky Bay Conference as a football-only member in 2027.)	Eagles	Toledo	Blue, Gold	1988

=== Associate members ===
School	Nickname	Location	Colors	Joined	Sport(s)	Primary Conference
Pettisville	Blackbirds	Clinton Township	Black, Gold, White	2020	Boys Soccer	Buckeye Border Conference

=== Former members ===
School	Nickname	Location	Colors	Membership Type	Tenure in League
Calvert	Senecas	Tiffin	Royal Blue, White	Full	2014-2016
Danbury	Lakers	Lakeside	Blue, White	Full	1988-2018
Edon	Bombers	Edon	Royal Blue, White	Football-only	2005-2025
Erie Mason	Eagles	Erie Township	Blue, Gold	Football-only	2025
Gibsonburg	Golden Bears	Gibsonburg	Orange, Black	Full	2011-2018
Hilltop	Cadets	West Unity	Red, White	Football-only	2005-2025
Lorain Catholic	Spartans	Lorain	Scarlet, Gray	Football-only	1999-2004
Montpelier	Locomotives	Montpelier	Navy Blue, Columbia Blue, White	Football-only	2016-2025
North Central	Eagles	Pioneer	Maroon, Black, White	Football-only	2025
Northwood	Rangers	Northwood	Blue, Yellow	Full	2000-2025
Ottawa Hills	Green Bears	Ottawa Hills	Kelly Green, White	Full	1988-2026
Stryker	Panthers	Stryker	Blue, White	Football-only	2018-2019
Summerfield	Bulldogs	Summerfield Township	Orange, Black	Football-only	2025
Whiteford	Bobcats	Whiteford Township	Blue, Gold	Football-only	2025

== League history ==
The TAAC began in 1988 when long-time rivals Danbury, Emmanuel Christian (then known as Emmanuel Baptist), Maumee Valley, and Ottawa Hills joined together with the recently expanded Toledo Christian (formerly McAuley High School) to compete in basketball. When Cardinal Strich joined in 1995 after going without sports for a while, the league teamed with the Buckeye Border Conference to create the 12-team Toledo Buckeye League, which involved cross-over games with both leagues' members. This setup only lasted until June 1998, but both leagues continue to have members compete against each other.

The first season for TAAC football was in 1999 with Cardinal Stritch, Danbury, Ottawa Hills, Toledo Christian and the recently added football-only Lorain Catholic competing for the inaugural title.

In 2000, Northwood left the Suburban Lakes League for the TAAC, wanting to compete with schools closer to their size. They initially joined in all sports but football (competing as an independent in 2000), but fully joined the league the next year.

The TAAC lost its first member when Lorain Catholic closed at the end of the 2003-04 school year.

Tired of competing in the Southern Central Athletic Association that was composed of several Michigan schools, Edon and Hilltop left to compete as football-only members in the TAAC in 2005. Former ties created in the old TBL made for the easy transition.

Emmanuel Baptist changed its name to Emmanuel Christian in the spring of 2006.

In September 2009, Gibsonburg applied for membership when it became evident that the Suburban Lakes League was going to fold in the spring of 2011. On October 7, they were admitted as the 8th full member school in the league, after being complimented for their facilities and comparable enrollment to current members. They became a full-voting member on January 1, 2010 and joined the league for the 2011–12 school year.

Former commissioner Dick Nowak noted that although the league was set with members, their five-year plan involved adding two more members and possibly going to a two-division format. He would not indicate which schools are interested in TAAC membership at the time. Rick Kaifas became the new TAAC commissioner on April 6, 2011.

In July 2012, Lakota High School and Fremont St. Joseph CC both sent letters of inquiry about joining the TAAC, concerned that the Midland Athletic League would dissolve after losing many members to other new leagues.

On May 13, 2013, Tiffin Calvert announced that they would join the TAAC right after the Midland Athletic League disbanded in the spring of 2014.

In May 2014, the TAAC approved adding NWOAL member Montpelier to its league for football only beginning with the 2016 season. Montpelier's school board approved the move in June 2014.

On December 10, 2014, Tiffin Calvert announced plans to leave the TAAC early and join the Sandusky Bay Conference beginning with the 2016–17 school year as part of the SBC's expansion plans.

On March 16, 2017, Danbury announced plans to join the Sandusky Bay Conference in the River Division of the Conference beginning in the 2018–19 school year. They will be exiting the TAAC as one of the first original members of the conference when it first formed in 1988.

On March 20, 2017, Gibsonburg also announced plans to leave the TAAC with Danbury to join the Sandusky Bay Conference in the River Division of the Conference beginning in the 2018-2019 school year. They will be exiting the TAAC as members since the 2011–12 school year.

In May 2017, it was announced that Stryker will join the league as a football-only member for the 2018 season.

In October 2019, Stryker and Toledo Christian agreed at a meeting to form the new Northern 8 Football Conference for OHSAA schools that are committing to play 8-man football for the future. The OHSAA does not currently sponsor the 8-man game, but several member schools resorted to that option recently instead of playing the traditional 11-man game or choosing not to play out the season. Stryker and Toledo Christian will forfeit their football membership in the TAAC, but will remain members of the Buckeye Border Conference and the TAAC respectively, for all other sports.

Beginning in the fall of 2020, Pettisville joined the league for boys soccer only.

In June 2022 the TAAC met with Michigan's Tri-County Conference to discuss a possible merger between the two leagues. Around this time Cardinal Stritch announced that they would not field an 11-man football team for the 2022 season. They were able to return to 11-man for the 2023 season.

In January 2024, Northwood and the Sandusky Bay Conference announced that the Rangers would be joining the SBC River Division for the 2025–26 school year.

In October 2024, it was announced that one school from Ohio, North Central, and three schools from Michigan, Erie Mason, Summerfield, and Whiteford, would join the league as football-only members starting with the 2025 season. North Central was a football independent and is a member of the Buckeye Border Conference along with Edon, Hilltop, and Montpelier for all other sports. Erie Mason, Summerfield, and Whiteford were the three remaining 11-man football members of their Michigan conference, the Tri-County Conference.

In December 2024, Toledo Christian announced it would return to 11-man football as an independent in 2025, and will return to the Toledo Area Athletic Conference in 2026.

On March 3, 2025 Ottawa Hills announced it would follow Northwood to the SBC in 2026.

In October 2025, the seven football only members of the conference (Edon, Erie Mason, Hilltop, Montpelier, North Central, Summerfield, Whiteford) announced they were leaving the TAAC after the 2025 season to form the football only Great Lakes Conference along with Sand Creek from Michigan in 2026. This would make Toledo Christian the only 11 man football team remaining in the conference, as it planned to return to a league schedule in 2026 after playing as an independent in 2025. In November 2025, Toledo Christian announced they would join the Sandusky Bay Conference as a football-only member in 2027.

On October 7, 2026, Cardinal Stritch announced it would close at the end of December 2026 due to declining enrollment and financial struggles. This will leave Emmanuel Christian, Maumee Valley, and Toledo Christian as the only remaining TAAC members.

== League championships ==
=== Football champions ===
Year	Champions
1999	Cardinal Stritch
2000	Ottawa Hills
2001	Northwood
2002	Northwood
2003	Northwood
2004	Northwood, Ottawa Hills
2005	Ottawa Hills
2006	Cardinal Stritch
2007	Northwood
2008	Northwood
2009	Northwood
2010	Toledo Christian
2011	Northwood
2012	Northwood
2013	Northwood
2014	Calvert
2015	Gibsonburg
2016	Gibsonburg, Montpelier
2017	Gibsonburg, Ottawa Hills
2018	Northwood
2019	Northwood
2020	Northwood
2021	Edon
2022	Ottawa Hills
2023	Ottawa Hills
2024	Ottawa Hills
2025	Whiteford

=== Boys Basketball Champions ===
Year	Champion(s)	Conference Record
1988-89	Ottawa Hills, Emmanuel Baptist	6-2
1989-90	Ottawa Hills, Emmanuel Baptist	7-1
1990-91	Ottawa Hills	7-1
1991-92	Toledo Christian	8-0
1992-93	Maumee Valley	6-2
1993-94	Danbury	8-0
1994-95	Danbury	7-1
1995-96	Ottawa Hills	9-1
1996-97	Ottawa Hills	10-0
1997-98	Emmanuel Baptist	10-0
1998-99	Danbury	8-2
1999-00	Danbury	8-2
2000-01	Danbury	9-3
2001-02	Maumee Valley	9-3
2002-03	Danbury, Ottawa Hills	10-2
2003-04	Ottawa Hills	11-1
2004-05	Danbury	12-0
2005-06	Toledo Christian	12-0
2006-07	Toledo Christian	12-0
2007-08	Ottawa Hills, Toledo Christian	11-1
2008-09	Ottawa Hills, Toledo Christian	11-1
2009-10	Ottawa Hills	12-0
2010-11	Ottawa Hills	11-1
2011-12	Maumee Valley	13-1
2012-13	Toledo Christian	13-1
2013-14	Ottawa Hills	14-0
2014-15	Gibsonburg	16-0
2015-16	Ottawa Hills	15-1
2016-17	Toledo Christian	14-0
2017-18	Cardinal Stritch	14-0
2018-19	Cardinal Stritch	9-1
2019-20	Toledo Christian	9-1
2020-21	Cardinal Stritch	5-0
2021-22	Ottawa Hills	8-2
2022-23	Emmanuel Christian	9-1

=== See also ===
Ohio High School Athletic Conferences

- List of TAAC Football Champions
- Elmwood will be eighth school in NBC
- Gibsonburg applies to become TAAC member
- The new Toledo Border League, Dec 8, 1994 (initially called the Toledo Border League, the setup eventually became the Toledo Buckeye League)
- TAAC basketball preview, Dec 1989
- Gibsonburg becomes eighth member of TAAC
- TAAC accepts Gibsonburg, Toledo Blade, Oct 8 2009
