= Buckeye Border Conference =

High school athletic conference in Ohio

The Buckeye Border Conference is a high school athletic league located in extreme northwest Ohio. The conference sponsors basketball, cross country, golf, and track and field for both boys and girls. In addition, baseball is sponsored for the boys, and softball and volleyball are sponsored for the girls.

== Members ==
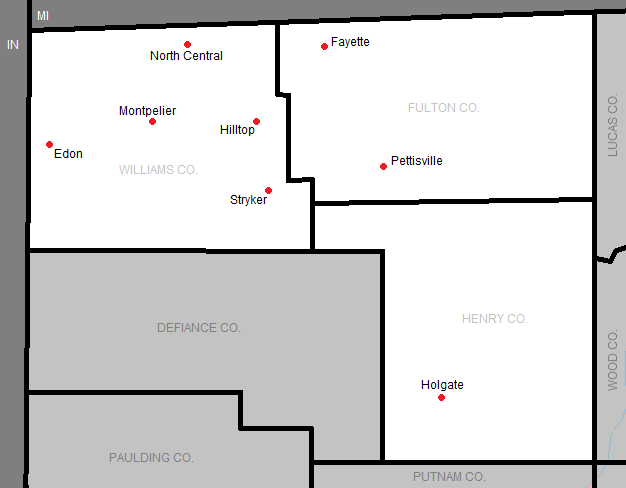
The member schools of the Buckeye Border Conference.

School	Nickname	Location	Colors	Joined League
Edon	Bombers	Edon	Blue, Silver	1967
Fayette	Eagles	Fayette	Purple, Gold	1967
Hilltop	Cadets	West Unity	Red, White	1967
Holgate	Tigers	Holgate	Purple, Gold	2021
Montpelier	Locomotives	Montpelier	Columbia Blue, Navy, White	1967-1978, 2016
North Central	Eagles	Pioneer	Red, Black, White	1967
Pettisville	Blackbirds	Pettisville	Black, Gold, White	1967
Stryker	Panthers	Stryker	Blue, White	1967

^Edon, Hilltop, Montpelier, and North Central have football teams that participate in the Toledo Area Athletic Conference, while Montpelier kept its wrestling program in the NWOAL. Holgate and Stryker participate in 8-man football as members of the Northern 8 Football Conference.

== Former members ==
School	Nickname	Location	Colors	Membership Tenure
Edgerton	Bulldogs	Edgerton	Maroon, Gold	1967-1975
Hicksville	Aces	Hicksville	Red, White	1967-1975

== League history ==
The BBC was established in 1967 primarily as a basketball conference. The initial members were Edgerton, Edon, Fayette, Hicksville, Hilltop, Montpelier, North Central, Pettisville, and Stryker.

Montpelier was also a member of the NWOAL at the same time and in 1969, joined the Northern Border League as well. Hilltop joined the football-only Northwest Buckeye League in 1971 so their football program had a league to compete in, and Edon followed suit shortly after. Montpelier would eventually leave in 1978 to become solely affiliated with the NWOAL. Edgerton and Hicksville would later join the Green Meadows Conference for all sports in 1975.

In 1995, the 6 remaining BBC schools made an agreement to play cross-over games with the Toledo Area Athletic Conference in the newly dubbed Toledo Buckeye League. This setup only lasted until June 30, 1998 before being dropped.

In 2005, Edon and Hilltop joined the TAAC as football-only members in order to get out of the primarily-Michigan based Southern Central Athletic Association. Previous ties with the old Toledo Buckeye League made for an easy transition.

In 2014, Montpelier was approved to join as a full member in the 2016-17 school year. They will play football in the TAAC with Edon and Hilltop, and remain an affiliate of the NWOAL for wrestling only.

In February 2016, Stryker announced plans to bring back their football team after 85 years. They intend to play at the junior high level before working their way up to a varsity program. In May 2017, Stryker announced that they will join the Toledo Area Athletic Conference for football only beginning with the 2018 season.

In 2017, Pioneer North Central put out an advertisement for a head football coach to help start their football program. Don Parrish was introduced as their inaugural junior high coach in May 2018, and similar to Stryker, they will work their way up to a varsity schedule.

In February 2020, it was announced that Holgate would join the BBC as a member for every sport except football, which will participate in the Northern 8 Football Conference. Holgate announced in late 2019 that they would move to 8-man football, which caused the remaining schools in the Green Meadows Conference to vote them out of the GMC over scheduling concerns. The Tigers joined the league in the fall of 2021.
