= Garrett, Auburn and Northern Electric Railroad =

Overview
- Locale: northern Indiana, USA
- Dates of operation: 1901 (chartered)–

Technical
- Length: 21 mi (34 km)

The Garrett, Auburn and Northern Electric Railroad (GA&N) was organized by Frank L. Welsheimer and incorporated on March 28, 1901, in the U.S. state of Indiana. It was formed to build an interurban railway from Garrett to Hamilton via Auburn and Waterloo, and had hoped to have completed construction by the end of Summer 1901. The initial cost estimate to construct 21 miles (34 km) of line was between $300,000 and $500,000. It was proposed that the railroad would form part of a continuous interurban line in conjunction with the Toledo and Western Railroad, Toledo and Indiana Railway and Chicago and Indiana Air Line Railway that would connect Toledo to Chicago, with the GA&N also building a branch from Waterloo to Fort Wayne, which would enable connections on other lines to Indianapolis. The combined line was known as the Toledo & Chicago Interurban Railway, with Welsheimer working as secretary of the system.

The last of the right-of-way acquisitions to start construction was completed in Auburn in late July 1901. Although the Waterloo city council granted a franchise to build on the city streets there in April 1901, the city council of Garrett finally approved the franchise to build the line on city streets in Garrett on December 23, 1902. Some reports of the time considered the plan foolish and claimed that it would not be built. Steel was ordered and construction began in Spring 1903. Construction of the line was contested in 1903 by the Wabash Railroad who initiated a frog war when the GA&N attempted to build across its line at Montpelier, Ohio. (Note: However, before this railroad was incorporated, agents for the Wabash had proposed a similar electric line to connect Auburn and Garrett to haul both passengers and freight.) Construction continued into 1905 with the first trains expected between Garrett and Auburn by November. The first regular trains on the route, operating as Toledo & Chicago trains, ran between Auburn and Garrett on February 22, 1906.
