= Dave Herman (American football) =

American football player (1941–2022)

No. 67
- Positions: Guard, Tackle

Personal information
- Born: September 3, 1941; Bryan, Ohio, U.S.
- Died: October 19, 2022 (aged 81); Valhalla, New York, U.S.
- Listed height: 6 ft 1 in (1.85 m)
- Listed weight: 255 lb (116 kg)

Career information
- High school: Edon (Edon, Ohio)
- College: Michigan State
- NFL draft: 1963: 8th round, 110th overall pick
- AFL draft: 1963: 27th round, 211th overall pick

Career history
- New York Jets (1964–1973)

Awards and highlights
- Super Bowl champion (III); AFL champion (1968); 2× AFL All-Star (1968, 1969); 3× All-AFL (1967, 1968, 1969)

Career NFL/AFL statistics
- Games played: 128
- Games started: 118
- Fumble recoveries: 2
- Stats at Pro Football Reference

David Jon Herman (September 3, 1941 – October 19, 2022) was an American professional football player who played offensive guard for ten seasons in the American Football League (AFL) and National Football League (NFL). He played for the New York Jets from 1964 to 1973, having earlier played college football for Michigan State University.

== Early life ==
Herman was born in Bryan, Ohio, on September 3, 1941. He was raised on a chicken farm in nearby Edon, Ohio, where he attended Edon High School. He then studied at Michigan State University, where he played football for the Spartans. He was selected by the New York Giants in the eighth round (110th overall) of the 1963 NFL draft, but did not sign He was also selected by the New York Jets in the 27th round (211th overall) of the 1964 AFL draft. He later revealed that he chose the Jets because they offered him $100 more than the Giants.

== Professional career ==
During his 1964 rookie season, Herman played in five games, but missed the rest of the year due to an ankle injury. From 1965 to 1968, he started all 14 of the Jets' regular season games. He was named to the AFL All-Star team in 1968 and 1969.

Herman was the starting right guard for the franchise during the 1968 season. His fellow starting offensive linemen that year included left tackle Winston Hill, left guard Randy Rasmussen, center John Schmidt, and right tackle Sam Walton. In preparation for Super Bowl III, Jets coach Weeb Ewbank moved Herman from right guard to right tackle to defend against Baltimore Colts' defensive lineman Bubba Smith. Bob Talamini replaced Herman at right guard and Sam Walton, a rookie, was benched. Herman's ability to neutralize the pass rush of Bubba Smith enabled Joe Namath to enjoy a solid game passing, hitting on 17 of 28 passes. It also helped open the running lanes for Jet fullback Matt Snell, who rushed for 121 yards as the Jets beat the heavily-favored Baltimore Colts 16–7.

The AFL merged with the NFL before the 1970 season. Herman again started all 14 games for the Jets in 1970 and 1971. He announced his retirement in April 1974.

== Later life ==
After retiring from professional football, Herman was employed as an account executive for Blair Television Company. He also worked in radio sports programming, partnering with Marty Glickman to announce Jets games on WOR Radio Network from 1974 to 1978. He later became a financial planner in New York City.

Herman was diagnosed with chronic traumatic encephalopathy in 2014. He died on October 19, 2022, in Valhalla, Westchester County, New York. He was 81 years old.
