= Stryker Local School District =

School district in Ohio, United States

Address
- 400 South Defiance Street Stryker, Ohio, 43557; United States

District information
- Type: Public
- Grades: PreK–12
- Superintendent: Nate Johnson
- Schools: 2
- NCES District ID: 3905065

Students and staff
- Students: 372 (2025–2026)
- Teachers: 31.40 (on an FTE basis) (2025–2026)
- Staff: 30.00 (on an FTE basis) (2025–2026)
- Student–teacher ratio: 11.85 (2025–2026)

Other information
- Website: www.strykerpanthers.net

The Stryker Local School District is a public school district in Williams County, Ohio, United States, based in Stryker, Ohio.

== Schools ==
The Stryker Local School District has one elementary school and one high school.

=== Elementary schools ===
- Stryker Elementary School

=== High school ===
- Stryker High School
