= Emmanuel Christian School (Toledo, Ohio) =

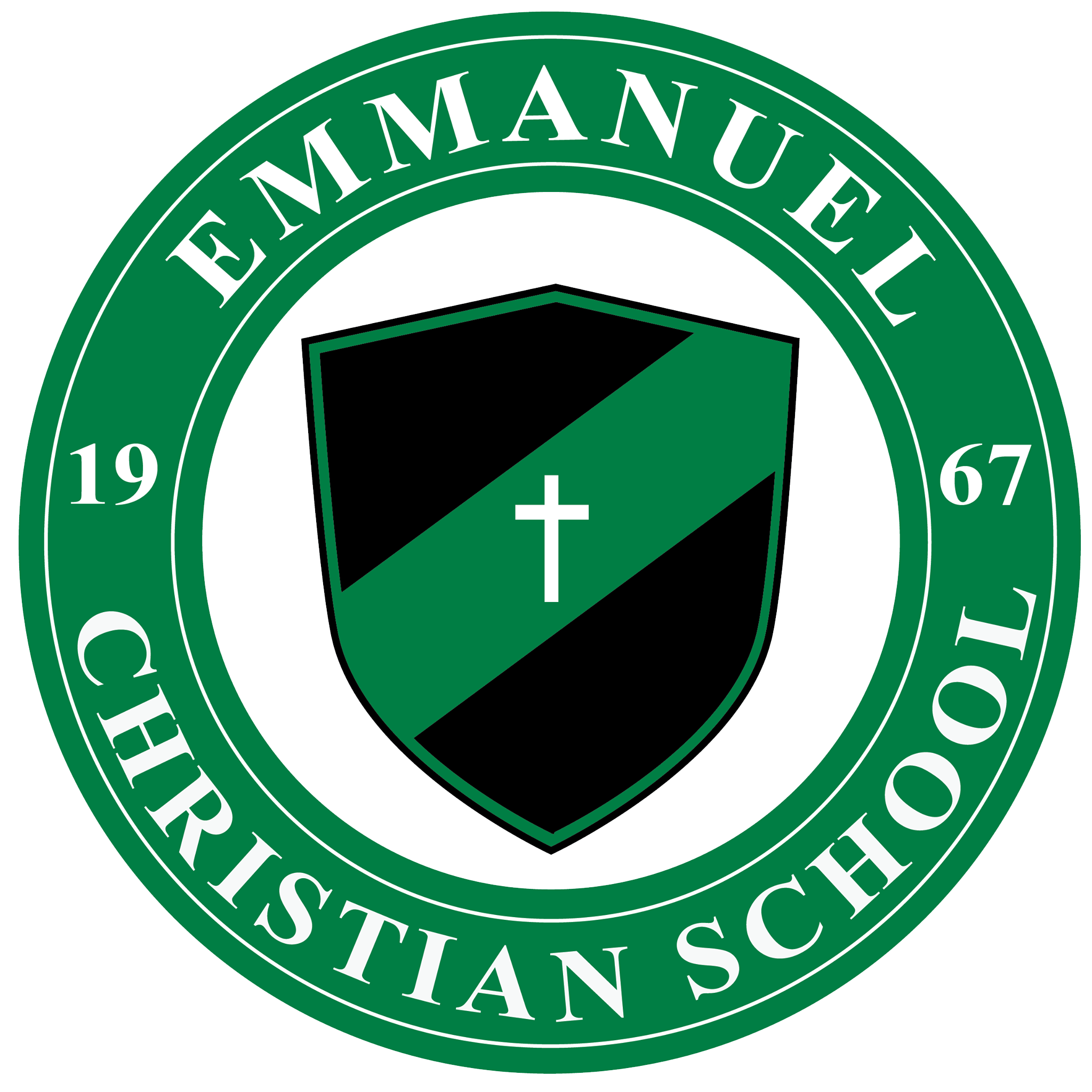

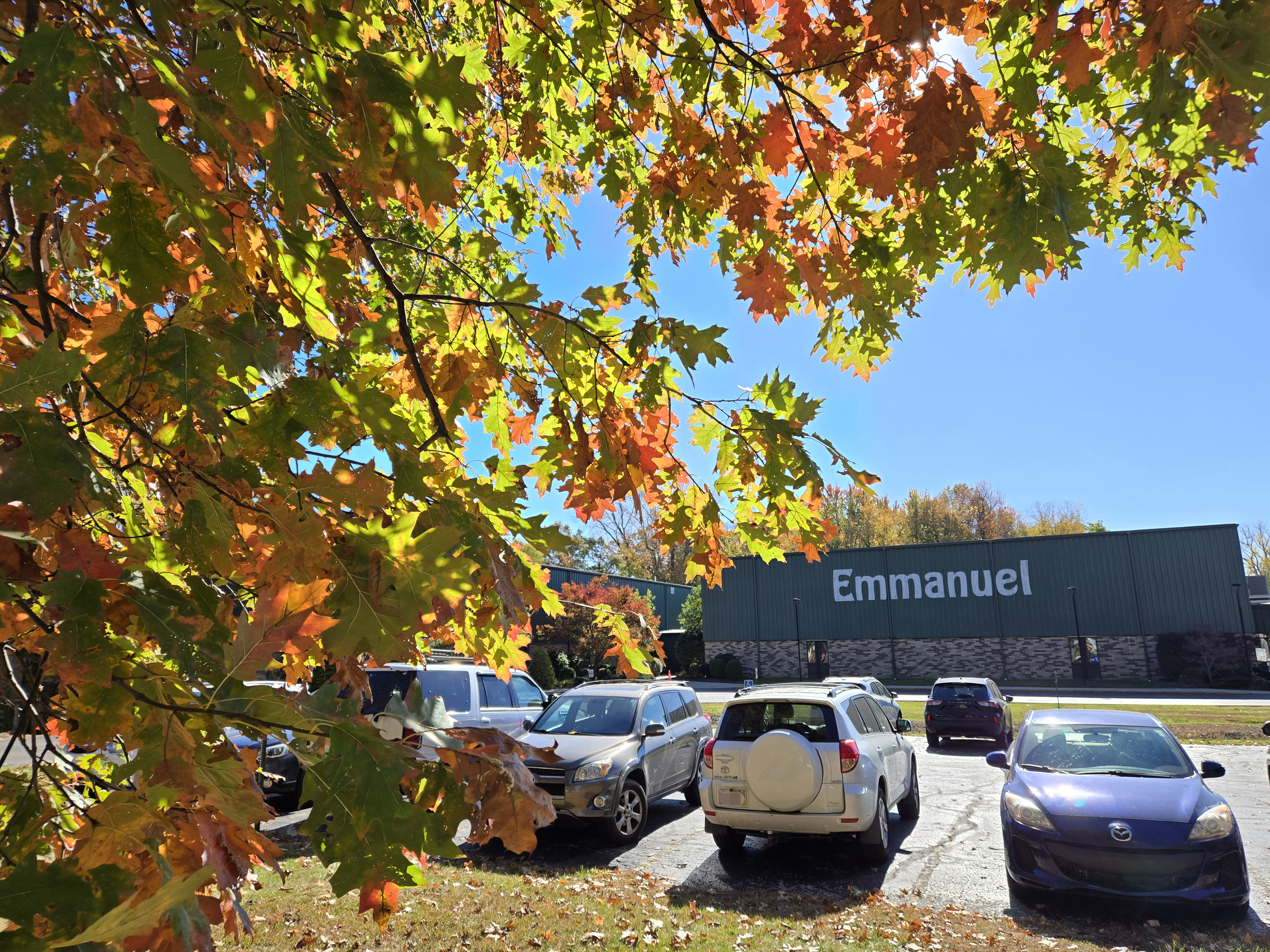
- Front entrance of the school

Location
- 4607 Laskey Road; Toledo, Ohio; United States
- 41°42′17″N 83°39′05″W

Information
- Type: Private
- Motto: Excellence Through Endurance
- Religious affiliation: Christian
- Established: 1967
- NCES School ID: A0108629
- Principal: (K-6) Heather Kickbusch (7-12) Dave Regnier
- Faculty: 55
- Grades: K–12
- Enrollment: 336 (2025–2026)
- Student to teacher ratio: 25:1
- Colors: Green and white
- Athletics conference: Toledo Area Athletic Conference
- Mascot: Warrior
- Nickname: EC Warrior Athletics
- Website: https://www.esctoledo.org

Emmanuel Christian School is an evangelical Christian school in Toledo, Ohio, United States, for grades K–12. The school was founded in 1967 under the name Emmanuel Baptist Christian School by Emmanuel Baptist Church. It was renamed Emmanuel Christian School in the spring of 2006. It is an accredited member of the Association of Christian Schools International.

The Emmanuel Warriors sport the colors of green and white and are members of the Toledo Area Athletic Conference. They are one of two schools in the league that do not have a football team (the other being Maumee Valley Country Day School). Their sports program includes soccer, cross country, volleyball, golf, basketball, cheerleading, track and field, softball, baseball, and tennis.

== 2005 arson incident ==
In December 2005, a fire broke out at the school causing administrators to cancel classes. The fire started in a chemical storage area used for science class demonstrations, where approximately 200 mL of mercury was stored. The mercury vaporized, causing contamination throughout the building, in addition to other vandalism, causing hundreds of thousands of dollars in damage. Two students were subsequently charged in Lucas County Juvenile Court with delinquency in connection with arson.

== Monclova Christian Academy et al v. Toledo-Lucas County Health Department ==
In December 2020, during the height of the COVID-19 pandemic, the school joined St. John's Jesuit and Monclova Christian Academy high schools in a lawsuit brought against the county health department by Citizens for Community Values, a Christian public policy organization. The lawsuit alleged that the state's effort to curb the spread of the virus by requiring students to temporarily attend online classes had violated their First Amendment right to religious expression. Their initial request for a preliminary injunction was denied, but was granted on appeal. Ohio Attorney General David Yost expressed his support for the court's decision to grant the schools' request.
