= Northwood Local School District =

School district in Ohio, United States

Address
- 700 Lemoyne Road Northwood, Ohio, 43619; United States
- Coordinates: 41°36′39″N 83°29′57″W

District information
- Type: Public
- Motto: "Excellence in Education"
- Grades: PreK–12
- Schools: 3
- NCES District ID: 3905071

Students and staff
- Students: 818 (2024–2025)
- Teachers: 52.17 (on an FTE basis) (2024–2025)
- Staff: 187.81 (on an FTE basis) (2024–2025)
- Student–teacher ratio: 15.68 (2024–2025)

Other information
- Website: www.northwoodschools.org

Northwood Local Schools is a school district in Northwest Ohio. The school district serves students who live in the cities of Northwood located in Wood County. The superintendent is Jason Kozina.

== Schools ==
- Northwood High School is the only high school in the district, and handles grades 7–12.
- Northwood Elementary School (Grades PK-6)

=== Former schools ===
Lark Elementary and Olney Elementary were razed in 2017, as was the Former Northwood High School Building which closed as a school in 2017 with the opening of the new Northwood Schools Building on the campus.
