= Edon, Ohio =

- Village
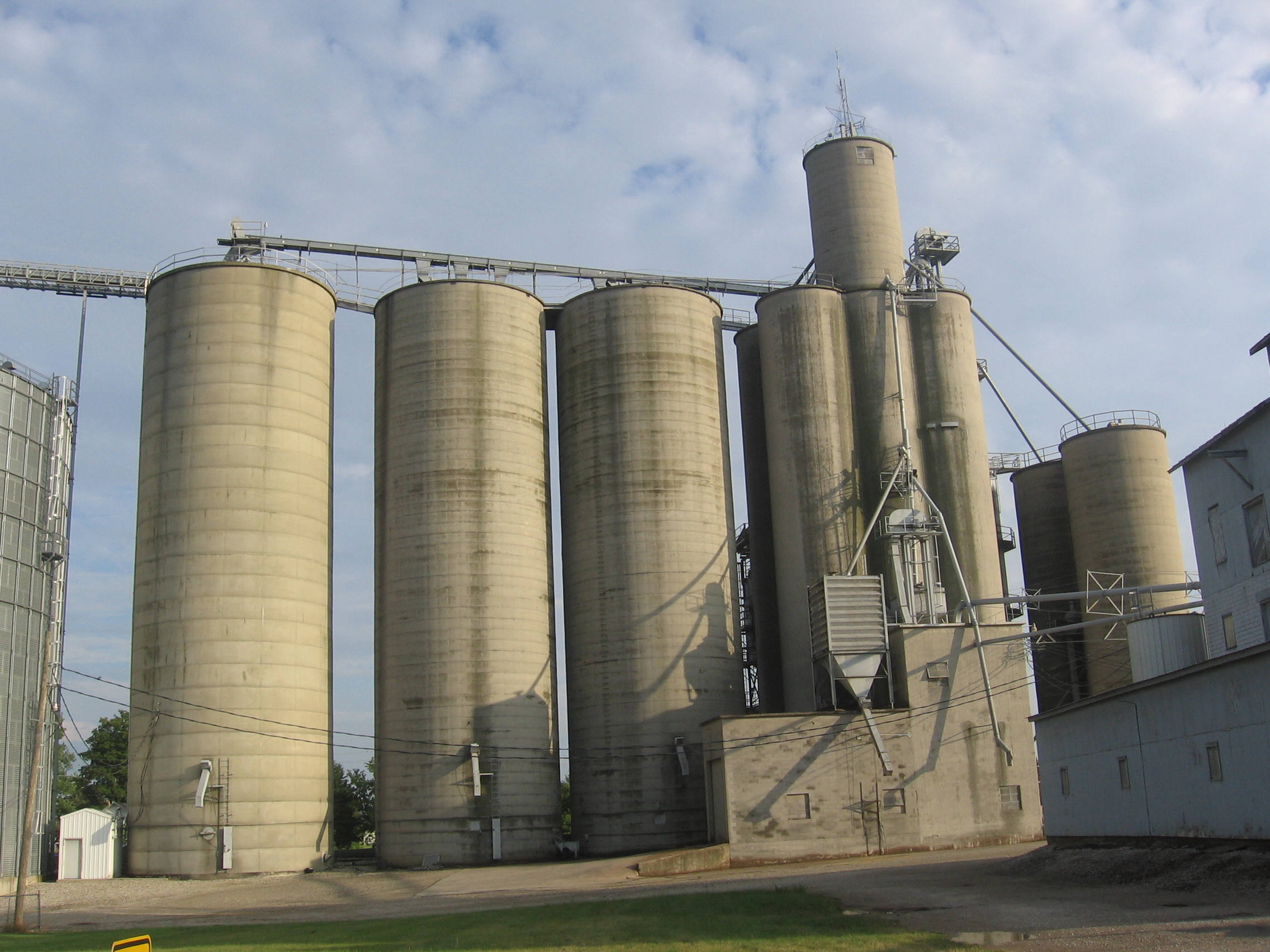
- Grain elevators on the south side of Edon

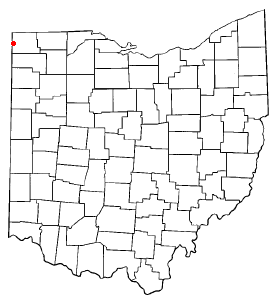
- Location of Edon, Ohio

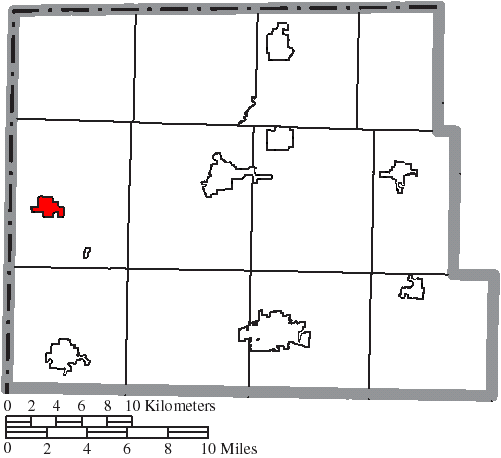
- Location of Edon in Williams County
- Coordinates: 41°33′22″N 84°46′10″W
- Country: United States
- State: Ohio
- County: Williams

Area
  - Total: 1.10 sq mi (2.84 km^{2})
  - Land: 1.10 sq mi (2.84 km^{2})
  - Water: 0 sq mi (0.00 km^{2})
- Elevation: 899 ft (274 m)

Population (2020)
  - Total: 796
  - Estimate (2023): 786
  - Density: 725.8/sq mi (280.24/km^{2})
- Time zone: UTC-5 (Eastern (EST))
  - Summer (DST): UTC-4 (EDT)
- ZIP code: 43518
- Area code: 419
- FIPS code: 39-24640
- GNIS feature ID: 2398790
- Website: https://edon-ohio.com/

Edon is a village in Williams County, Ohio, United States. The population was 796 at the 2020 census.

== History ==
Edon was platted in 1867. A post office has been in operation at Edon since 1867.

== Geography ==
Edon is located in northwest Ohio approximately 2 miles east of the Indiana state line, at the intersection of Ohio Routes 34 and 49.

According to the United States Census Bureau, the village has a total area of 1.12 square miles (2.90 km^{2}), all land.

== Demographics ==
Historical population
| Census | Pop. | Note | %± |
|---|---|---|---|
| 1880 | 513 | | — |
| 1890 | 601 | | 17.2% |
| 1900 | 740 | | 23.1% |
| 1910 | 678 | | −8.4% |
| 1920 | 610 | | −10.0% |
| 1930 | 581 | | −4.8% |
| 1940 | 635 | | 9.3% |
| 1950 | 645 | | 1.6% |
| 1960 | 757 | | 17.4% |
| 1970 | 803 | | 6.1% |
| 1980 | 947 | | 17.9% |
| 1990 | 880 | | −7.1% |
| 2000 | 898 | | 2.0% |
| 2010 | 834 | | −7.1% |
| 2020 | 796 | | −4.6% |
| 2023 (est.) | 786 | ▼ | −1.3% |
U.S. Decennial Census

=== 2010 census ===
As of the census of 2010, there were 834 people, 339 households, and 225 families living in the village. The population density was 744.6 inhabitants per square mile (287.5/km^{2}). There were 369 housing units at an average density of 329.5 per square mile (127.2/km^{2}). The racial makeup of the village was 98.0% White, 0.1% African American, 0.2% Native American, 0.2% Asian, and 1.4% from two or more races. Hispanic or Latino of any race were 0.8% of the population.

There were 339 households, of which 31.6% had children under the age of 18 living with them, 52.5% were married couples living together, 8.6% had a female householder with no husband present, 5.3% had a male householder with no wife present, and 33.6% were non-families. 28.6% of all households were made up of individuals, and 15% had someone living alone who was 65 years of age or older. The average household size was 2.46 and the average family size was 3.02.

The median age in the village was 37.8 years. 25.5% of residents were under the age of 18; 9% were between the ages of 18 and 24; 25.1% were from 25 to 44; 22.8% were from 45 to 64; and 17.7% were 65 years of age or older. The gender makeup of the village was 48.1% male and 51.9% female.

=== 2000 census ===
As of the census of 2000, there were 898 people, 360 households, and 249 families living in the village. The population density was 863.2 inhabitants per square mile (333.3/km^{2}). There were 375 housing units at an average density of 360.5 per square mile (139.2/km^{2}). The racial makeup of the village was 98.89% White, 0.45% Asian, 0.22% from other races, and 0.45% from two or more races. Hispanic or Latino of any race were 0.33% of the population.

There were 360 households, out of which 34.2% had children under the age of 18 living with them, 56.9% were married couples living together, 10.0% had a female householder with no husband present, and 30.6% were non-families. 26.7% of all households were made up of individuals, and 14.7% had someone living alone who was 65 years of age or older. The average household size was 2.49 and the average family size was 3.03.

In the village, the population was spread out, with 27.7% under the age of 18, 6.7% from 18 to 24, 28.4% from 25 to 44, 21.5% from 45 to 64, and 15.7% who were 65 years of age or older. The median age was 36 years. For every 100 females there were 89.9 males. For every 100 females age 18 and over, there were 86.5 males.

The median income for a household in the village was $43,500, and the median income for a family was $48,214. Males had a median income of $33,125 versus $20,900 for females. The per capita income for the village was $17,099. About 3.8% of families and 5.2% of the population were below the poverty line, including 5.9% of those under age 18 and 14.3% of those age 65 or over.

== Education ==
Edon High School is a public high school in Edon, and is the only high school in the Edon Northwest Local Schools district. Their nickname is the Bombers. They are members of the Buckeye Border Conference and, for football only, the Toledo Area Athletic Conference.

Notable alumni of Edon High School include Mel Held, a major league pitcher for the Baltimore Orioles in 1956, and Dave Herman, who went on to play football collegiately at Michigan State University from 1960 to 1964. Herman then played professionally with the New York Jets from 1964 to 1973, twice earning all-pro honors. He was the starting offensive right tackle in the Jets' 16–7 win over the Baltimore Colts in Super Bowl III.

Edon has a public library, a branch of the Williams County Public Library.
