= Pioneer and Fayette Railroad =

Railroad that operated in Ohio, USA

The Pioneer and Fayette Railroad (PF) was a railroad that operated in Ohio.

The P&F began operations in November 1934 using abandoned Toledo and Western Railroad trackage between Pioneer and Fayette, Ohio. The P&F connected with the Wabash at Franklin Junction near Alvordton, Ohio.

Motive power for the P&F was a Plymouth 25-ton model HL 4-wheel gasoline locomotive (builder plate #3835) built in 1936. The locomotive was first numbered 102 and later became number 10.

Track diagram, ca. 1986

About 1943, the P&F was cut back to 0.5 miles of track at Franklin Junction and freight was trans-loaded onto P&F trucks for final delivery. The only industry actually located on the P&F was a small feed/grain facility, which also served as the railroad's engine maintenance shed, since both the "main track" and passing track ran through the building.

In 1986, grant money was obtained in an attempt to revitalize the P&F, which by then was out of service. The line was upgraded with new rails, ties and heavy ballast. Plymouth No. 10, was given a complete reconstruction and re-engined with a 1985 Oldsmobile 98 engine.

It was intended that the P&F would become the unloading point for shipments of grain for a large hog farm located nearby, but apparently, rate divisions with the Norfolk Southern Railway could not be worked out, leaving little or no traffic on the revitalized P&F.

The P&F was abandoned in 1992; its tariff was cancelled in July 1994. Locomotive number 10 was sold in 1993 to Colasanti's Tropical Garden in Ruthven, Ontario where it was re-lettered as the fictitious "Buckwheat & Durham Railroad" number 1. Around January 1996 it was sold to W.G. Thompson & Sons Ltd. for their grain facility at Kent Bridge, Ontario.
