= Toledo and Indiana Railway =

Former electric railroad in Ohio

The Toledo and Indiana Railway, Inc., was a combined electric interurban railroad and electric company that operated in Ohio between Toledo and Bryan via Stryker from 1901 to 1939.

== History ==
The Toledo & Indiana Railway, Inc., was incorporated in 1901 to construct an electric interurban line westwards from Toledo to Stryker, Ohio, and was extended in 1905 to Bryan, Ohio. The line ran parallel to the Lake Shore and Michigan Southern Railway (later the New York Central) on the north side of that alignment.

It was envisioned as being a link to Indianapolis, Indiana, and Chicago, Illinois. These expansions and connections were not completed. A branch of the Garrett, Auburn and Northern Electric Railroad from Waterloo, Indiana, to Bryan was never constructed. The line offered more frequent service at lower fares than the adjacent steam road. It had 31 stations on its 57-mile (92 km) line between Toledo and Bryan. At its peak, Toledo was served by eleven interurban companies.

“In 1905, the T. & I. constructed a power plant near the Tiffin River in Stryker, and rails were extended to Bryan. Later that year, the T. & I. completed a car maintenance and storage facility east of its power plant and erected a combination passenger/freight depot on East Lynn Street in Stryker. The T. & I. power plant helped electrify northwest Ohio, bringing much of the area into the ‘modern age.’”

“As highways and secondary roads improved, and automobiles and trucks became more common, interurban railways struggled financially. In July 1939, the Public Utilities Commission of Ohio approved the T. & I’s request to abandon its interurban rail line.

“On October 15, 1939, T. & I. Car 115 made the last trip over the rail line piloted by Lendall W. Vernier of Stryker.”

The last T. & I. car arrived at the Vulcan station near the University of Toledo in 1939.

Portions of the abandoned right-of-way can still be seen. On September 23, 2006, an Ohio Historical Marker recognizing Stryker's rich railroad heritage was dedicated at the Stryker depot. The passenger station for the line through Wauseon became the Dyer & McDermott store downtown.
