= Pettisville High School =

Location
- 232 Summit Street; Pettisville, (Fulton County), Ohio 43553; United States
- Coordinates: 41°31′49″N 84°13′40″W

Information
- Type: Public, Coeducational high school
- School district: Pettisville Local Schools
- Superintendent: Josh Clark
- Principal: Adam Wagner
- Teaching staff: 15.83 (FTE)
- Grades: 7-12
- Student to teacher ratio: 13.83
- Colors: Black and Gold and White
- Song: Alma Mater
- Athletics conference: Buckeye Border Conference
- Sports: 9 Competitive sports. Cross Country, Cheerleading, Golf, Soccer, Volleyball, Basketball, Track, Softball and Baseball
- Mascot: Blackbird
- Team name: Blackbirds
- Website: pettisvilleschools.org
- File:Front Page Kids First Day of School1.jpg

Pettisville High School is a public high school in Pettisville, Ohio. It is the only high school in the Pettisville Local Schools district. Their nickname is the Blackbirds. They are members of the Buckeye Border Conference. Pettisville Local Schools, located 30 miles west of Toledo in Fulton County, Ohio is a unique school district in terms of Ohio education today. The district, one of the smaller districts in the state, enjoys an almost unduplicated level of public support. Pettisville is a school of “choice” in that it ranks in the top fifteen districts statewide in percentage of students who “choose” schools. About one in three students come to Pettisville from other Ohio school districts through the provisions of open enrollment.

== Ohio High School Athletic Association State Championships ==
- Boys Track and Field – 1991
