= Montpelier High School (Ohio) =

Location
- 1015 E. Brown Rd; Montpelier, (Williams County), Ohio 43543; United States; 41.5735°N 84.5965°W

Information
- Type: Public, Coeducational high school
- Superintendent: Jamison Grime
- Principal: Su Thorp
- Teaching staff: 31.00 (FTE)
- Grades: 7-12
- Student to teacher ratio: 10.23
- Colors: Navy blue, Columbia Blue and White
- Athletics conference: BBC; Great Lakes Conference (football-only); NWOAL (wrestling-only)
- Team name: Locomotives
- Website: https://hs.montpelier-k12.org/

Montpelier High School is a public high school in Montpelier, Ohio. It is the only high school in the Montpelier Exempted Village School district. Their nickname is the Locomotives. They are primarily members of the Buckeye Border Conference.

== Athletics ==
Beginning with the 2016–17 school year, Montpelier became a member of the Buckeye Border Conference after a long tenure (1926–2016) as a member of the Northwest Ohio Athletic League. The Locos play football in the Great Lakes Conference, remain in the NWOAL for wrestling only, and participate in every other sport as a BBC member.

=== Buckeye Border Conference championships (2016–) ===
- Varsity Boys Cross Country – 2016
- Varsity Boys Track & Field – 2017, 2018, 2019
- Varsity Boys Golf – 2021*, 2022*, 2023

=== Toledo Area Athletic Conference football championships (2016–) ===
- 2016*

=== Northwest Ohio Athletic League (NWOAL) championships (1926–2016) ===
- Football: 1928, 1945, 1946*, 1950, 1983*
- Volleyball: 1975, 1976, 1979, 1980, 2000*
- Boys Basketball: 1930–31*, 1954–55, 1955–56
- Girls Basketball: 1998–99*
- Wrestling: 1959–60
- Baseball: 1956
- Boys Track & Field: 1927, 1940*, 1943, 1944, 1951, 1961, 1963, 1970, 1980
- Girls Track & Field: 1973, 1974, 1975, 1976

Note: shared league titles are denoted with an asterisk (*)
