= North Central High School (Pioneer, Ohio) =

Location
- 400 Baubice St. Pioneer, (Williams County), Ohio 43554; United States; 41°40′45″N 84°32′53″W

Information
- Type: Public, Coeducational high school
- Superintendent: Michael Bute
- Principal
- Teaching staff: 17.00 (FTE)
- Grades: 7-12
- Student to teacher ratio: 14.12
- Colors: Red, Black & White
- Athletics conference: Buckeye Border Conference; Great Lakes Conference (football only)
- Mascot: Eagles, Edgar the Eagle
- Nickname: Eagles
- Athletic Director: Michael Babin
- Website: http://www.ncschool.k12.oh.us/

North Central High School is a public high school in Pioneer, Ohio. It is the only high school in the North Central Local Schools district. Their nickname is the Eagles. They are members of the Buckeye Border Conference for all sports except football, which is in the Great Lakes Conference.
