= Montpelier, Ohio =

- Village
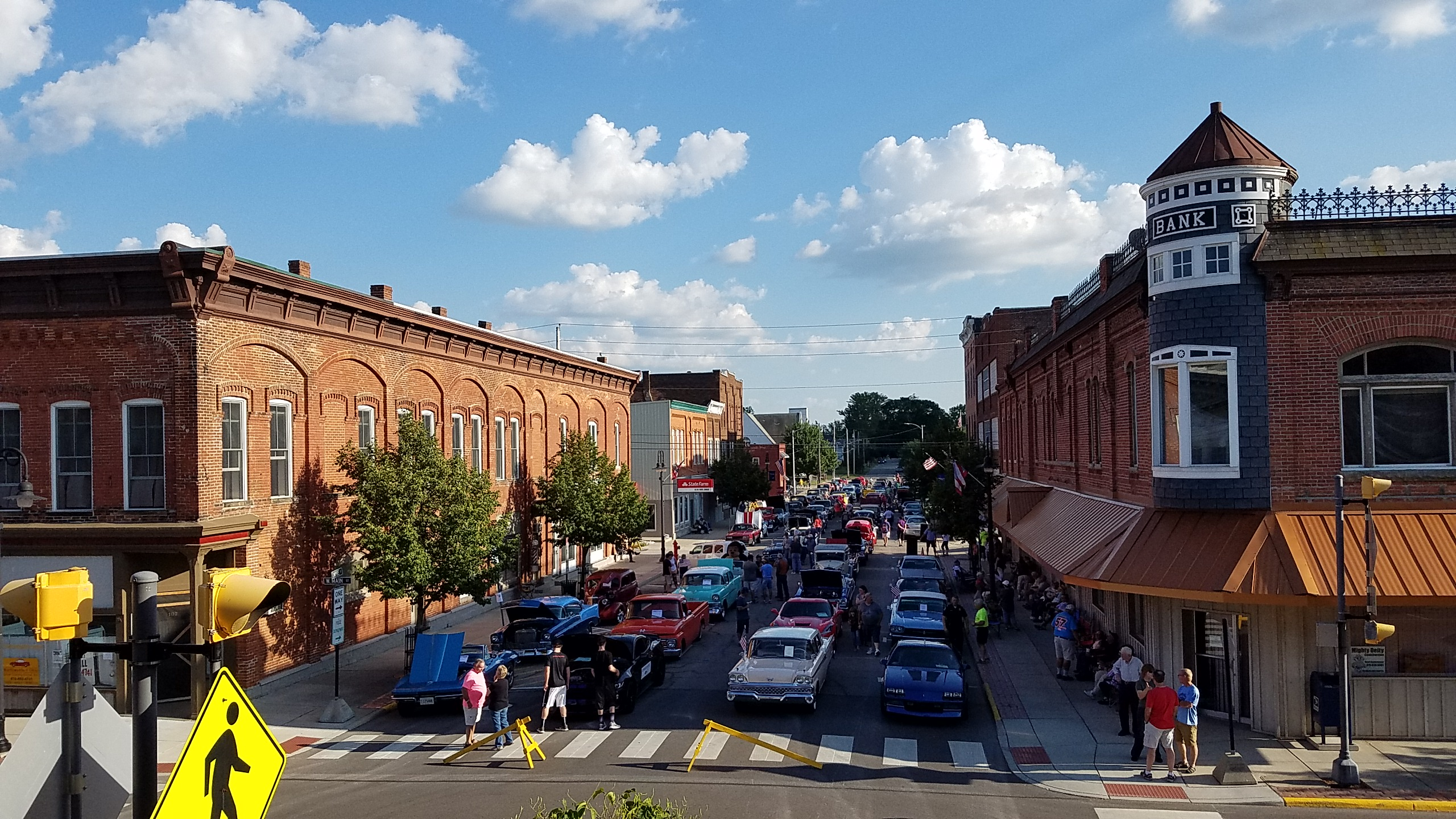
- Downtown Montpelier
- Interactive map of Montpelier, Ohio
- Location within Ohio Location within the United States
- Coordinates: 41°34′54″N 84°35′48″W
- Country: United States
- State: Ohio
- County: Williams
- Village of Montpelier: 1845

Area
  - Total: 2.88 sq mi (7.47 km^{2})
  - Land: 2.87 sq mi (7.44 km^{2})
  - Water: 0.012 sq mi (0.03 km^{2})
- Elevation: 863 ft (263 m)

Population (2020)
  - Total: 3,942
  - Density: 1,371.5/sq mi (529.52/km^{2})
- Time zone: UTC-5 (Eastern (EST))
  - Summer (DST): UTC-4 (EDT)
- ZIP code: 43543
- Area code: 419
- FIPS code: 39-51772
- GNIS feature ID: 2399390
- Website: Montpelier, OH

Montpelier (/mɒntˈpiːljər/ mont-PEEL-yər) is a village in Williams County, Ohio, United States. The population was 3,942 at the 2020 census.

== History ==
Montpelier was platted in 1845. The village was named after Montpelier, Vermont. A post office has been in operation at Montpelier since 1846. Montpelier was incorporated as a village in 1875.

== Geography ==
According to the United States Census Bureau, the village has a total area of 2.93 square miles (7.59 km^{2}), of which 2.91 square miles (7.54 km^{2}) is land and 0.02 square miles (0.05 km^{2}) is water.

=== Climate ===
Climate data for Montpelier, Ohio (1991–2020 normals, extremes 1893–present)
| Month | Jan | Feb | Mar | Apr | May | Jun | Jul | Aug | Sep | Oct | Nov | Dec | Year |
|---|---|---|---|---|---|---|---|---|---|---|---|---|---|
| Record high °F (°C) | 69 (21) | 71 (22) | 86 (30) | 90 (32) | 100 (38) | 104 (40) | 109 (43) | 106 (41) | 102 (39) | 92 (33) | 81 (27) | 69 (21) | 109 (43) |
| Mean maximum °F (°C) | 53.7 (12.1) | 55.1 (12.8) | 70.3 (21.3) | 79.5 (26.4) | 86.9 (30.5) | 93.5 (34.2) | 94.1 (34.5) | 92.3 (33.5) | 89.0 (31.7) | 81.8 (27.7) | 65.9 (18.8) | 55.6 (13.1) | 95.6 (35.3) |
| Mean daily maximum °F (°C) | 31.5 (−0.3) | 34.7 (1.5) | 45.4 (7.4) | 58.8 (14.9) | 70.3 (21.3) | 79.7 (26.5) | 83.4 (28.6) | 81.3 (27.4) | 75.1 (23.9) | 62.4 (16.9) | 47.5 (8.6) | 36.3 (2.4) | 58.9 (14.9) |
| Daily mean °F (°C) | 24.0 (−4.4) | 26.5 (−3.1) | 35.9 (2.2) | 47.7 (8.7) | 59.2 (15.1) | 68.9 (20.5) | 72.5 (22.5) | 70.5 (21.4) | 63.6 (17.6) | 51.7 (10.9) | 39.4 (4.1) | 29.6 (−1.3) | 49.1 (9.5) |
| Mean daily minimum °F (°C) | 16.6 (−8.6) | 18.2 (−7.7) | 26.4 (−3.1) | 36.6 (2.6) | 48.1 (8.9) | 58.1 (14.5) | 61.5 (16.4) | 59.7 (15.4) | 52.1 (11.2) | 40.9 (4.9) | 31.2 (−0.4) | 22.9 (−5.1) | 39.4 (4.1) |
| Mean minimum °F (°C) | −3.3 (−19.6) | −0.4 (−18.0) | 9.4 (−12.6) | 23.3 (−4.8) | 34.0 (1.1) | 44.3 (6.8) | 50.6 (10.3) | 48.8 (9.3) | 37.8 (3.2) | 27.0 (−2.8) | 16.6 (−8.6) | 4.4 (−15.3) | −7.0 (−21.7) |
| Record low °F (°C) | −25 (−32) | −22 (−30) | −7 (−22) | 8 (−13) | 24 (−4) | 34 (1) | 43 (6) | 36 (2) | 28 (−2) | 13 (−11) | −1 (−18) | −21 (−29) | −25 (−32) |
| Average precipitation inches (mm) | 2.42 (61) | 2.18 (55) | 2.63 (67) | 3.57 (91) | 4.32 (110) | 3.77 (96) | 3.50 (89) | 4.13 (105) | 3.11 (79) | 2.79 (71) | 3.08 (78) | 2.42 (61) | 37.92 (963) |
| Average snowfall inches (cm) | 9.2 (23) | 8.9 (23) | 4.4 (11) | 0.8 (2.0) | 0.0 (0.0) | 0.0 (0.0) | 0.0 (0.0) | 0.0 (0.0) | 0.0 (0.0) | 0.1 (0.25) | 1.3 (3.3) | 7.8 (20) | 32.5 (83) |
| Average precipitation days (≥ 0.01 in) | 11.0 | 8.9 | 9.8 | 11.7 | 12.5 | 10.4 | 8.9 | 10.0 | 8.7 | 9.6 | 10.5 | 10.3 | 122.3 |
| Average snowy days (≥ 0.1 in) | 6.8 | 6.0 | 3.1 | 0.6 | 0.0 | 0.0 | 0.0 | 0.0 | 0.0 | 0.0 | 1.5 | 4.9 | 22.9 |
Source: NOAA

== Demographics ==
=== 2020 census ===
As of the 2020 census, Montpelier had a population of 3,942. The median age was 39.5 years. 23.9% of residents were under the age of 18 and 17.8% of residents were 65 years of age or older. For every 100 females there were 100.2 males, and for every 100 females age 18 and over there were 97.6 males age 18 and over.

0.0% of residents lived in urban areas, while 100.0% lived in rural areas.

There were 1,656 households in Montpelier, of which 28.2% had children under the age of 18 living in them. Of all households, 41.4% were married-couple households, 20.7% were households with a male householder and no spouse or partner present, and 27.9% were households with a female householder and no spouse or partner present. About 32.4% of all households were made up of individuals and 14.6% had someone living alone who was 65 years of age or older.

There were 1,837 housing units, of which 9.9% were vacant. The homeowner vacancy rate was 3.3% and the rental vacancy rate was 14.2%.

Racial composition as of the 2020 census
| Race | Number | Percent |
|---|---|---|
| White | 3,649 | 92.6% |
| Black or African American | 19 | 0.5% |
| American Indian and Alaska Native | 9 | 0.2% |
| Asian | 42 | 1.1% |
| Native Hawaiian and Other Pacific Islander | 3 | 0.1% |
| Some other race | 48 | 1.2% |
| Two or more races | 172 | 4.4% |
| Hispanic or Latino (of any race) | 171 | 4.3% |

=== 2010 census ===
As of the census of 2010, there were 4,072 people, 1,649 households, and 1,055 families living in the village. The population density was 1,399.3 inhabitants per square mile (540.3/km^{2}). There were 1,843 housing units at an average density of 633.3 per square mile (244.5/km^{2}). The racial makeup of the village was 96.2% White, 0.1% African American, 0.5% Native American, 1.4% Asian, 0.4% from other races, and 1.3% from two or more races. Hispanic or Latino of any race were 3.4% of the population.

There were 1,649 households, of which 33.4% had children under the age of 18 living with them, 42.4% were married couples living together, 15.0% had a female householder with no husband present, 6.5% had a male householder with no wife present, and 36.0% were non-families. 30.7% of all households were made up of individuals, and 12.4% had someone living alone who was 65 years of age or older. The average household size was 2.43 and the average family size was 3.00.

The median age in the village was 36.1 years. 26.9% of residents were under the age of 18; 8% were between the ages of 18 and 24; 26.2% were from 25 to 44; 24.5% were from 45 to 64; and 14.5% were 65 years of age or older. The gender makeup of the village was 47.5% male and 52.5% female.

=== 2000 census ===
As of the census of 2000, there were 4,320 people, 1,751 households, and 1,131 families living in the village. The population density was 1,601.0 inhabitants per square mile (618.1/km^{2}). There were 1,866 housing units at an average density of 691.5 per square mile (267.0/km^{2}). The racial makeup of the village was 96.62% White, 0.30% African American, 0.16% Native American, 1.48% Asian, 0.02% Pacific Islander, 0.65% from other races, and 0.76% from two or more races. Hispanic or Latino of any race were 1.53% of the population.

There were 1,751 households, out of which 33.6% had children under the age of 18 living with them, 48.0% were married couples living together, 11.8% had a female householder with no husband present, and 35.4% were non-families. 30.2% of all households were made up of individuals, and 15.1% had someone living alone who was 65 years of age or older. The average household size was 2.43 and the average family size was 2.99.

In the village, the population was spread out, with 27.4% under the age of 18, 9.8% from 18 to 24, 27.6% from 25 to 44, 19.0% from 45 to 64, and 16.2% who were 65 years of age or older. The median age was 34 years. For every 100 females there were 90.2 males. For every 100 females age 18 and over, there were 86.2 males.

The median income for a household in the village was $31,678, and the median income for a family was $41,250. Males had a median income of $31,389 versus $21,508 for females. The per capita income for the village was $14,791. About 4.3% of families and 6.2% of the population were below the poverty line, including 5.2% of those under age 18 and 7.3% of those age 65 or over.

== State highways ==
- SR 107
- SR 576

== Village government ==
Montpelier is a Charter Village with a strong Manager/Village Council form of government. The Village Manager is currently Jason Rockey and the Village Mayor is Steve Yagelski.

The Village of Montpelier also provides citizens with central services such as water, electric, and sewer. Montpelier is provided public safety services by a full-time police department and a full-time fire chief, who commands a volunteer fire staff.

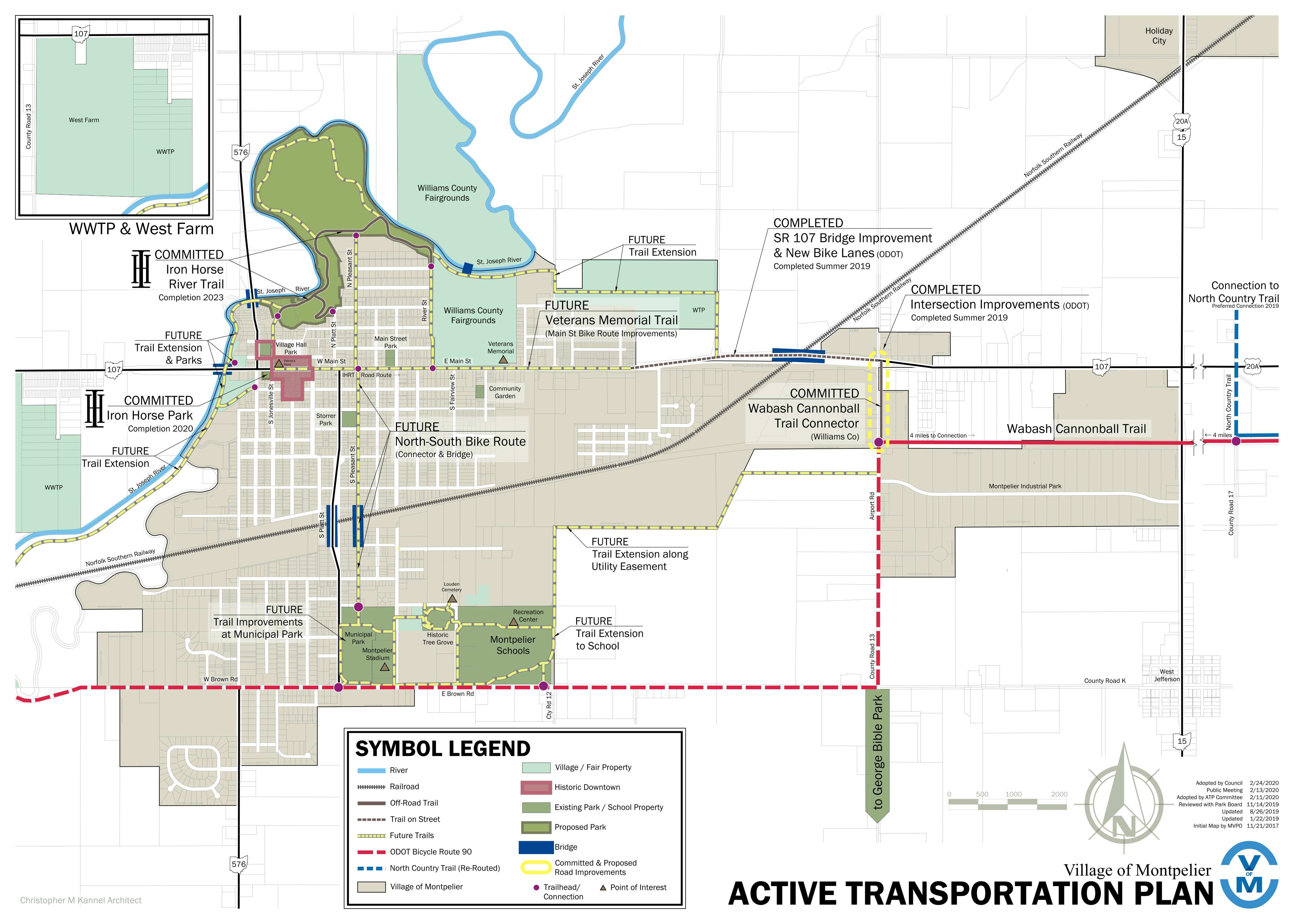
Montpelier Active Transportation Plan Adopted:2020

== Parks and Recreation ==
Montpelier has several parks located around the village that include several amenities such as pavilions, playgrounds, and trails. In 1956, the Montpelier Athletic Boosters purchased the land where they established the first Montpelier Municipal Park. In 2017, the Village of Montpelier adopted an Active Transportation Plan to expand on existing trails, and to create a network of trails for walking and bicycling.

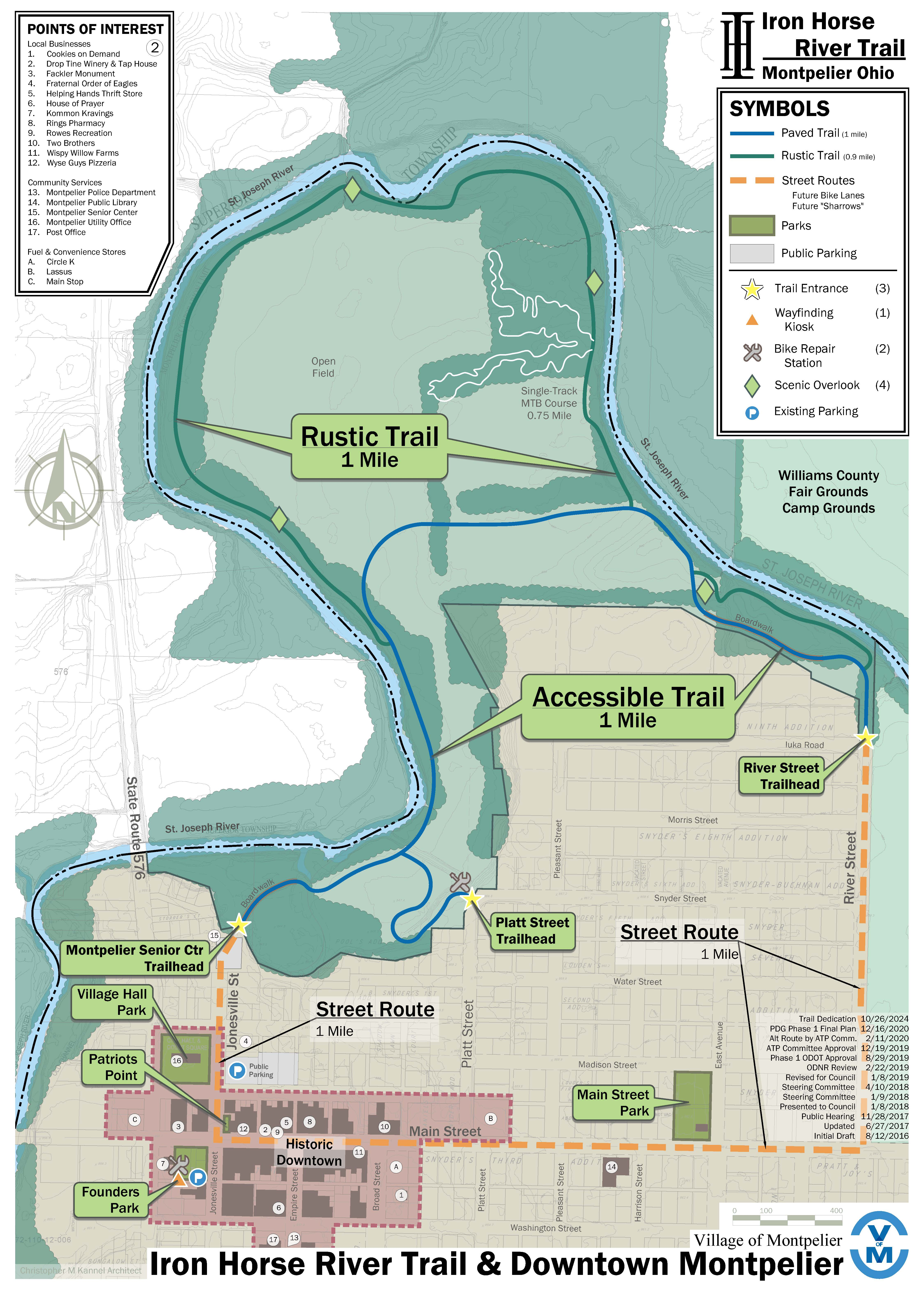
Iron Horse River Trail - 2024

The Iron Horse River Trail is a multiple-use trail along the St. Joseph River. The trail includes 1 mile of paved accessible trail connecting Montpelier Senior Center to the Williams County Fairgrounds, 1 mile of rustic trail and a 0.75 mile single-track mountain bike trail. Funding for the paved trail came from a Transportation Alternatives Program grant through Ohio Department of Transportation (ODOT). The trail was dedicated October 26, 2024.

The Wabash Cannonball Trail, Bike Route 90, is one of Ohio's longest rail-trails, covering a total of 63 miles and traversing four counties: Fulton, Henry, Lucas, and Williams. The trail ends at County Road 13 at the eastern edge of the Village of Montpelier corporation limits. The Village Parks and Recreation have a comprehensive website.

Historical population
| Census | Pop. | Note | %± |
|---|---|---|---|
| 1880 | 406 | | — |
| 1890 | 1,293 | | 218.5% |
| 1900 | 1,869 | | 44.5% |
| 1910 | 2,759 | | 47.6% |
| 1920 | 3,052 | | 10.6% |
| 1930 | 3,677 | | 20.5% |
| 1940 | 3,703 | | 0.7% |
| 1950 | 3,867 | | 4.4% |
| 1960 | 4,131 | | 6.8% |
| 1970 | 4,184 | | 1.3% |
| 1980 | 4,431 | | 5.9% |
| 1990 | 4,299 | | −3.0% |
| 2000 | 4,320 | | 0.5% |
| 2010 | 4,072 | | −5.7% |
| 2020 | 3,942 | | −3.2% |
U.S. Decennial Census

Village of Montpelier Parks & Recreation

== Education ==
Montpelier is served by the Montpelier Exempted Village School District. Montpelier Junior/Senior High School and Montpelier Elementary School share the same campus, which is located on the village's south side. Their nickname is the Locomotives. They are a member of the Buckeye Border Conference, Toledo Area Athletic Conference for football, and Northwest Ohio Athletic League for wrestling.

Montpelier Exempted Village Schools

== Water quality awards ==
In 2003, 2006, 2007, 2017, and 2022 Montpelier won the Berkeley Springs International Water Tasting competition for its municipal water supply. Montpelier triumphed over cities as diverse as Sparwood, British Columbia and Rice Lake, Wisconsin.

== County fairgrounds ==
The Williams County Fairgrounds is located on Montpelier's east side. The Williams County Historical Museum is located on the fairgrounds.

== Notable people ==
- Jon Husted, American politician serving as the junior Senator from Ohio since 2025
- Zach Roerig, actor
- Paul Siple, Antarctic explorer
