= Stryker High School =

Location
- 400 S Defiance St. Stryker, (Williams County), Ohio 43557; United States
- 41°30′03″N 84°24′55″W

Information
- Type: Public, Coeducational high school
- Superintendent: Nate Johnson
- Principal: Jamison Grime
- Teaching staff: 14.00 (FTE)
- Grades: 9-12
- Student to teacher ratio: 11.57
- Colors: Blue and white
- Athletics conference: Buckeye Border Conference; Northern 8 Football Conference (football-only)
- Nickname: Panthers
- Athletic Director: Kent Holsopple
- Website: http://www.stryker.k12.oh.us/

Stryker High School is a public high school in Stryker, Ohio. It is the only high school in the Stryker Local Schools district. Their nickname is the Panthers. They are members of the Ohio High School Athletic Association in the Buckeye Border Conference and the Northern 8 Football Conference

== History ==
Opened in 1922, Stryker High School serves students grades 9-12

In its current campus, they house students grades 7-12.

A new high school building was constructed in 2009, with its old building being torn down shortly after.

In February 2016, Stryker announced plans to bring back their football team after 85 years. They intend to play at the junior high level before working their way up to a varsity program. In May 2017, Stryker joined the Toledo Area Athletic Conference for football only beginning with the 2018 season, where the remained until they became a founding member of the Northern 8 Football Conference, an 8-man football conference in 2019.

== Athletics ==
Stryker High School currently offers:

- Baseball
- Basketball
- Cheerleading
- Cross Country
- Golf
- Football (8-man)
- Softball
- Track and field
- Volleyball
