= Pioneer, Ohio =

- Village
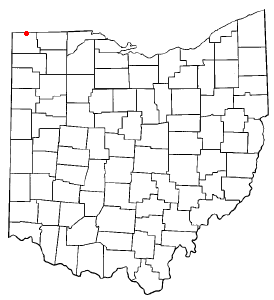
- Location of Pioneer, Ohio

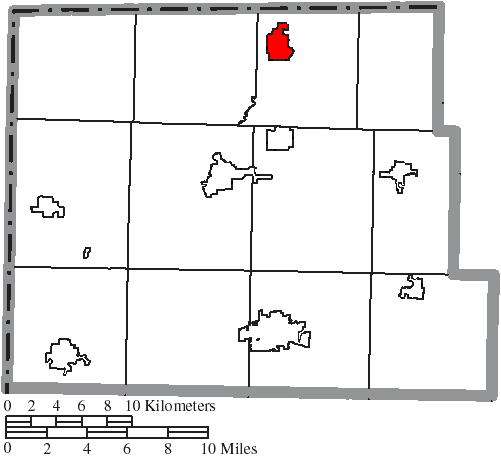
- Location of Pioneer in Williams County
- Coordinates: 41°40′44″N 84°33′03″W
- Country: United States
- State: Ohio
- County: Williams
- Township: Madison

Area
  - Total: 2.11 sq mi (5.47 km^{2})
  - Land: 2.04 sq mi (5.28 km^{2})
  - Water: 0.069 sq mi (0.18 km^{2})
- Elevation: 869 ft (265 m)

Population (2020)
  - Total: 1,429
  - Density: 700.6/sq mi (270.51/km^{2})
- Time zone: UTC-5 (Eastern (EST))
  - Summer (DST): UTC-4 (EDT)
- ZIP code: 43554
- Area code: 419
- FIPS code: 39-62834
- GNIS feature ID: 2399678
- Website: http://www.villageofpioneer.com/ http://www.pioneerchamber.com/

Pioneer is a village in Williams County, Ohio, United States. The population was 1,429 at the 2020 census.

== History ==
Pioneer was platted in 1853. A post office has been in operation at Pioneer since 1851.

From 1903, the village was the terminus of an electric interurban passenger railroad from Toledo called the Toledo and Western Railway, which was hoping to become a link in an electric rail service from that city to Chicago but which got no further. The line closed to passengers in 1933 but continued freight service until 1943, from 1934 as the Pioneer and Fayette Railroad. This was only formally abandoned in 1991.

== Geography ==
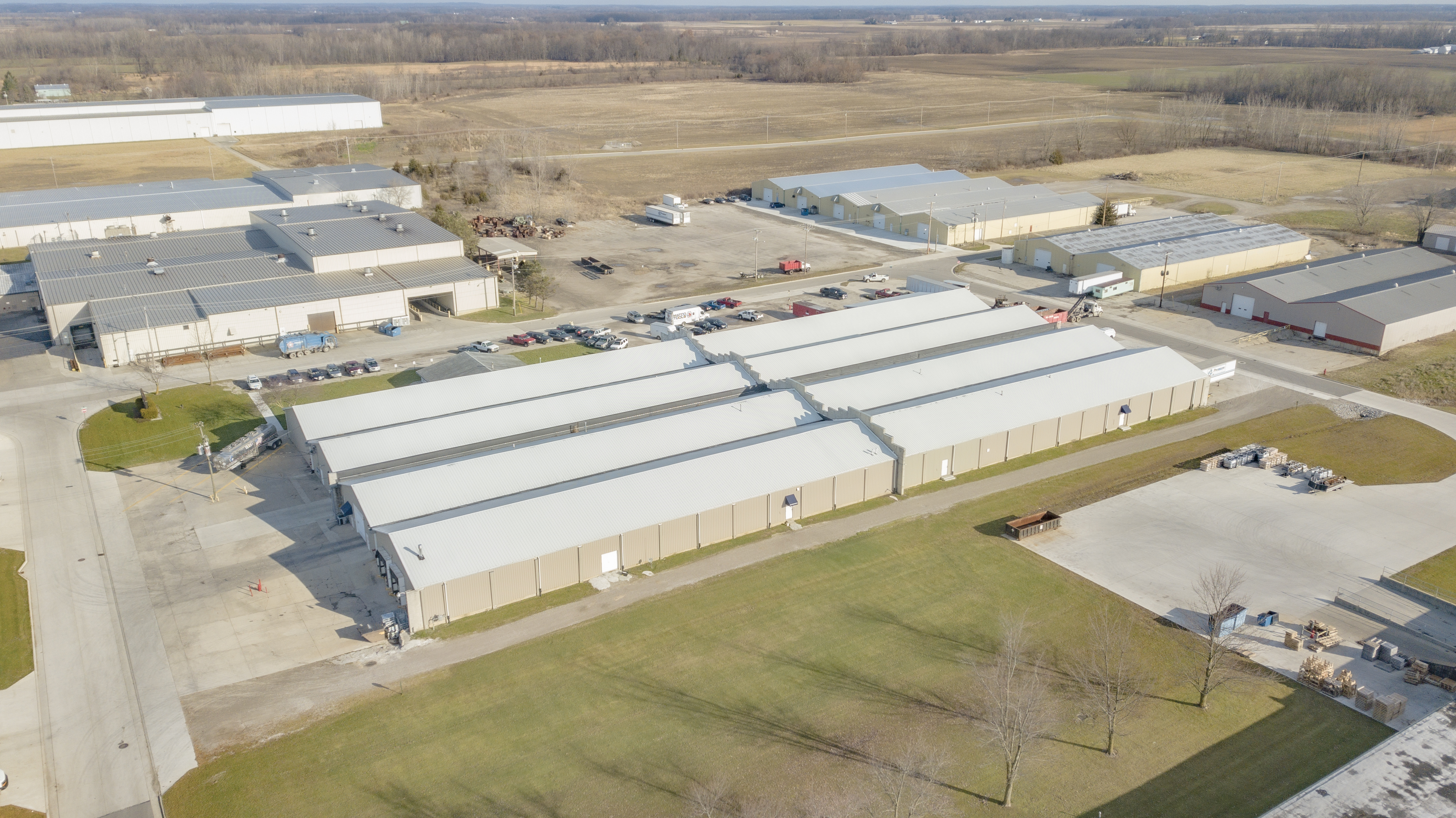
Pioneer, OH Industrial District

According to the United States Census Bureau, the village has a total area of 2.09 square miles (5.41 km^{2}), of which 2.02 square miles (5.23 km^{2}) is land and 0.07 square miles (0.18 km^{2}) is water.

== Demographics ==
Historical population
| Census | Pop. | Note | %± |
|---|---|---|---|
| 1870 | 338 | | — |
| 1880 | 754 | | 123.1% |
| 1890 | 596 | | −21.0% |
| 1900 | 603 | | 1.2% |
| 1910 | 660 | | 9.5% |
| 1920 | 774 | | 17.3% |
| 1930 | 686 | | −11.4% |
| 1940 | 762 | | 11.1% |
| 1950 | 696 | | −8.7% |
| 1960 | 855 | | 22.8% |
| 1970 | 968 | | 13.2% |
| 1980 | 1,133 | | 17.0% |
| 1990 | 1,287 | | 13.6% |
| 2000 | 1,460 | | 13.4% |
| 2010 | 1,380 | | −5.5% |
| 2020 | 1,429 | | 3.6% |
U.S. Decennial Census

As of 2000 the median income for a household in the village was $37,153, and the median income for a family was $46,369. Males had a median income of $32,917 versus $21,466 for females. The per capita income for the village was $18,024. About 5.9% of families and 6.5% of the population were below the poverty line, including 8.0% of those under age 18 and 5.3% of those age 65 or over.

=== 2010 census ===
As of the census of 2010, there were 1,380 people, 583 households, and 375 families residing in the village. The population density was 683.2 inhabitants per square mile (263.8/km^{2}). There were 653 housing units at an average density of 323.3 per square mile (124.8/km^{2}). The racial makeup of the village was 96.3% White, 0.8% African American, 0.4% Native American, 0.1% Asian, 0.7% from other races, and 1.7% from two or more races. Hispanic or Latino of any race were 4.6% of the population.

There were 583 households, of which 32.6% had children under the age of 18 living with them, 45.8% were married couples living together, 11.8% had a female householder with no husband present, 6.7% had a male householder with no wife present, and 35.7% were non-families. 30.9% of all households were made up of individuals, and 9.4% had someone living alone who was 65 years of age or older. The average household size was 2.37 and the average family size was 2.89.

The median age in the village was 36.6 years. 25% of residents were under the age of 18; 9% were between the ages of 18 and 24; 25.6% were from 25 to 44; 26.7% were from 45 to 64; and 13.7% were 65 years of age or older. The gender makeup of the village was 48.7% male and 51.3% female.

== Education ==
North Central High School is renovated with a new high school in 2016 and is a public high school in Pioneer. A member of the Buckeye Border Conference, it is the only high school in the North Central Local Schools district. The school's sports teams are nicknamed the Eagles.

Pioneer has a public library, a branch of the Williams County Public Library.
