= Northwood High School (Ohio) =

Location
- 700 Lemoyne Rd; Northwood, Ohio 43619; United States
- 41°36′17″N 83°28′30″W

Information
- School district: Northwood Local School District
- Principal: Tracy Petteys
- Teaching staff: 23.00 (on an FTE basis)
- Grades: 7-12
- Enrollment: 373 (2023–24)
- Student to teacher ratio: 16.22
- Colors: Blue and Gold
- Athletics conference: Sandusky Bay Conference
- Mascot: Rangers
- Website: Northwood Local School District

Northwood High School is a public high school in Northwood, Ohio. It is the only high school in the Northwood Local School District. Their nickname is the Rangers, with the school colors of blue and gold. They are currently members of the Sandusky Bay Conference.
