= Northwood, Ohio =

- City
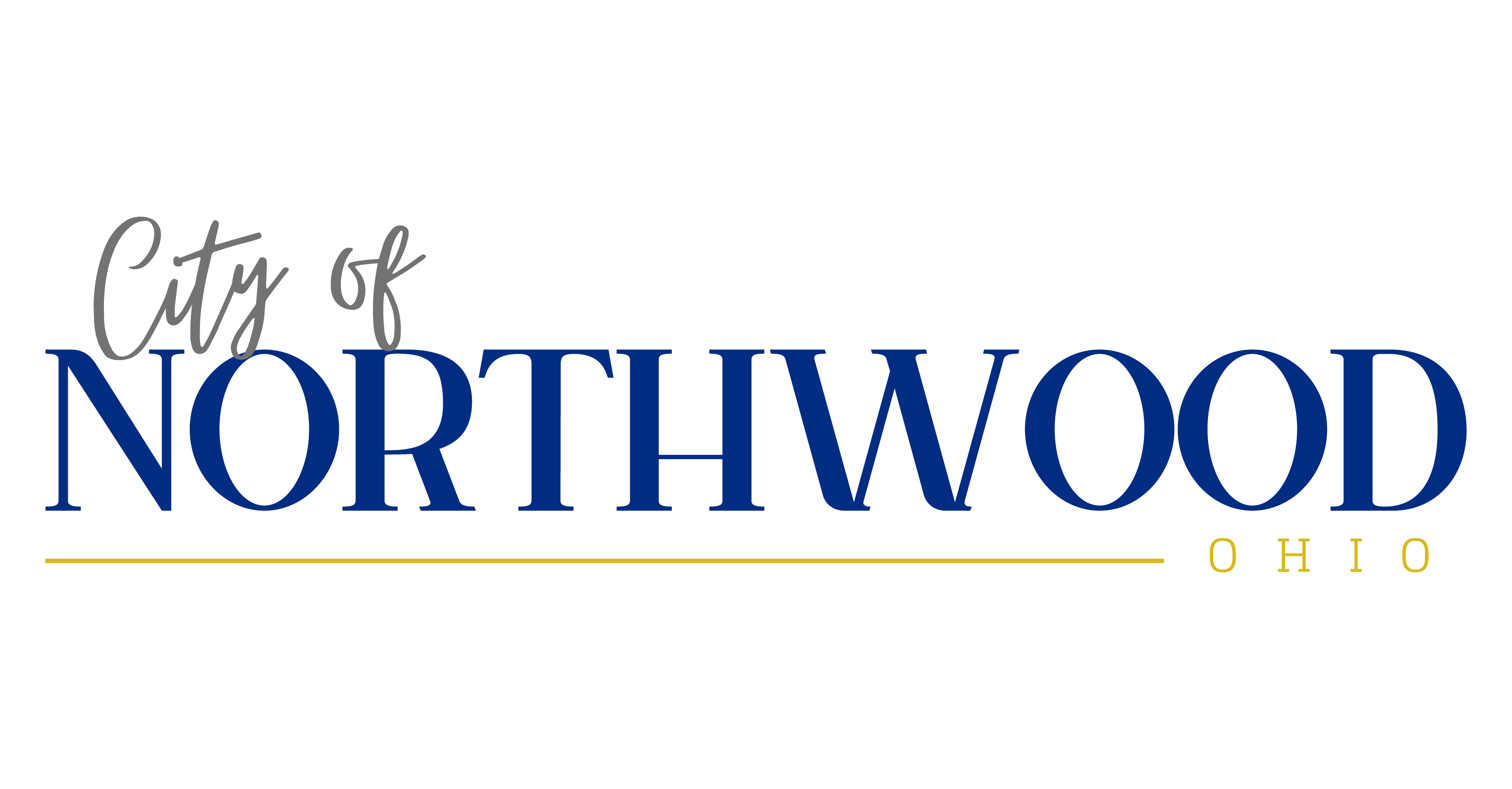
- Flag Logo
- Motto: "Where Opportunity Abounds"
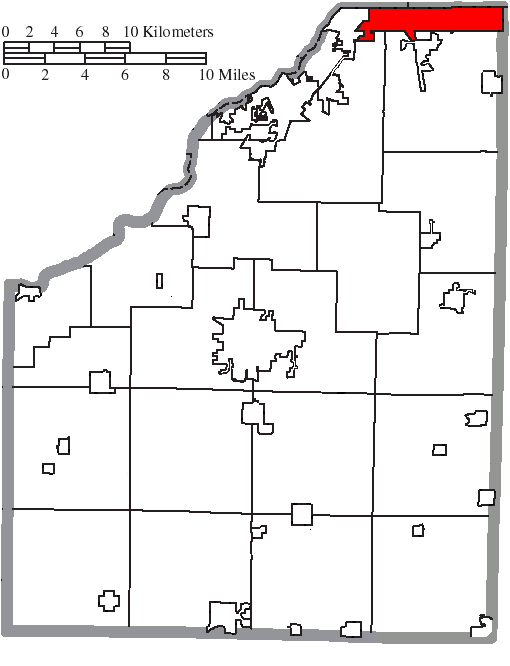
- Location of Northwood in Wood County

- Location within Ohio Location within the United States
- Coordinates: 41°36′32″N 83°29′01″W
- Country: United States
- State: Ohio
- County: Wood

Area
  - Total: 8.57 sq mi (22.20 km^{2})
  - Land: 8.56 sq mi (22.16 km^{2})
  - Water: 0.012 sq mi (0.03 km^{2})
- Elevation: 614 ft (187 m)

Population (2020)
  - Total: 5,160
  - Density: 603.0/sq mi (232.82/km^{2})
- Time zone: UTC-5 (Eastern (EST))
  - Summer (DST): UTC-4 (EDT)
- ZIP code: 43619
- Area code: 419
- FIPS code: 39-57190
- GNIS feature ID: 1087191
- Website: https://www.northwoodoh.gov/

Northwood is a city and eastern suburb in Wood County, Ohio, United States, within the Toledo metropolitan area. The population was 5,160 at the 2020 census.

== History ==
Northwood was originally Ross Township. It was the northernmost township in Wood County from its establishment on April 18, 1874 until December 1, 1962. Farms, gardens, orchards, and railroads covered the area located just south of east Toledo. In 1898 Edward Ford's glass factory was built along the Maumee River, which ultimately led to the incorporation of the village of Rossford in 1939 within the western portion of the township. Ross Township was then divided so that Rossford Township would serve as a barrier between Rossford and the remaining Ross Township. On December 1, 1962, Ross Township ceased to exist when it became incorporated as the city of Northwood, so aptly named because of its location at the top of Wood County. With its departure, Wood County dropped its number of townships from 20 to 19.

The original boundary of Ross Township can be observed as follows: beginning at the southeastern corner of Northwood, thence westward along the southern border to Rossford, thence westward along the line of Elm Tree Street to the Maumee River, thence northeastward and eastward along the Lucas County border until the Ottawa County border, and thence southward to the point of beginning.

== Government ==
The government consists of an elected Mayor, elected City Council, and appointed City Administrator. City Council consists of seven members, elected to four-year terms. The City Mayor is also elected to serve a four-year term.

=== Government Services ===
- Charter form of government, Mayor and seven City Council members elected at-large, City Administrator, Mayor's Court, City Clerk, Zoning Department, Finance Department and Street Department.
- Police Department- Consists of a Chief of Police, three Sergeants, twelve full-time Patrol Officers, a K-9 Officer (K9 Odin), and a School Resource Officer.
- Fire Department- Full time department consisting of two fire stations with a part-time Fire Chief, Deputy Chief, District Chief, Captain, 5 Lieutenants and 26 on-call/part-time EMT's and Paramedics.
- Trash Pickup- Curbside weekly refuse collection on Monday by Waste Management, Inc.
- Water- City of Toledo (west end of City) and City of Oregon & Wood County (east end of City).
- Sanitary Sewer- City of Northwood / Northwestern Water & Sewer District.

== Geography ==
According to the United States Census Bureau, the city has a total area of 8.53 square miles (22.09 km^{2}), of which 8.52 square miles (22.07 km^{2}) is land and 0.01 square miles (0.03 km^{2}) is water.

=== Adjoining Municipalities and Townships ===
- Rossford - West
- Perrysburg Township - South-West
- Lake Township - South
- Toledo - North
- Ottawa County (Curtice) - East
- Oregon - North-East
- Walbridge - South

== Demographics ==
Historical population
| Census | Pop. | Note | %± |
|---|---|---|---|
| 1970 | 4,222 | | — |
| 1980 | 5,495 | | 30.2% |
| 1990 | 5,506 | | 0.2% |
| 2000 | 5,471 | | −0.6% |
| 2010 | 5,265 | | −3.8% |
| 2020 | 5,160 | | −2.0% |
| 2025 (est.) | 5,252 | | 1.8% |

=== 2020 census ===
As of the 2020 census, Northwood had a population of 5,160. The median age was 41.6 years. 21.4% of residents were under the age of 18 and 17.6% of residents were 65 years of age or older. For every 100 females there were 98.1 males, and for every 100 females age 18 and over there were 96.7 males age 18 and over.

98.5% of residents lived in urban areas, while 1.5% lived in rural areas.

There were 2,069 households in Northwood, of which 28.0% had children under the age of 18 living in them. Of all households, 49.8% were married-couple households, 17.1% were households with a male householder and no spouse or partner present, and 23.0% were households with a female householder and no spouse or partner present. About 24.8% of all households were made up of individuals and 10.1% had someone living alone who was 65 years of age or older.

There were 2,182 housing units, of which 5.2% were vacant. The homeowner vacancy rate was 0.9% and the rental vacancy rate was 10.2%.

Racial composition as of the 2020 census
| Race | Number | Percent |
|---|---|---|
| White | 4,414 | 85.5% |
| Black or African American | 59 | 1.1% |
| American Indian and Alaska Native | 11 | 0.2% |
| Asian | 64 | 1.2% |
| Native Hawaiian and Other Pacific Islander | 0 | 0.0% |
| Some other race | 121 | 2.3% |
| Two or more races | 491 | 9.5% |
| Hispanic or Latino (of any race) | 475 | 9.2% |

=== 2010 census ===
As of the census of 2010, there were 5,265 people, 2,025 households, and 1,463 families living in the city. The population density was 618.0 inhabitants per square mile (238.6/km^{2}). There were 2,135 housing units at an average density of 250.6 per square mile (96.8/km^{2}). The racial makeup of the city was 94.3% White, 0.7% African American, 0.6% Native American, 1.1% Asian, 1.3% from other races, and 2.1% from two or more races. Hispanic or Latino of any race were 5.8% of the population.

There were 2,025 households, of which 33.3% had children under the age of 18 living with them, 55.0% were married couples living together, 12.7% had a female householder with no husband present, 4.6% had a male householder with no wife present, and 27.8% were non-families. 22.0% of all households were made up of individuals, and 8.3% had someone living alone who was 65 years of age or older. The average household size was 2.60 and the average family size was 3.03.

The median age in the city was 39 years. 24.1% of residents were under the age of 18; 9.4% were between the ages of 18 and 24; 24.4% were from 25 to 44; 30.6% were from 45 to 64; and 11.5% were 65 years of age or older. The gender makeup of the city was 49.0% male and 51.0% female.

=== 2000 census ===
As of the census of 2000, there were 5,471 people, 2,024 households, and 1,493 families living in the city. The population density was 651.1 inhabitants per square mile (251.4/km^{2}). There were 2,121 housing units at an average density of 252.4 per square mile (97.5/km^{2}). The racial makeup of the city was 94.99% White, 0.60% African American, 0.40% Native American, 0.99% Asian, 0.04% Pacific Islander, 1.72% from other races, and 1.26% from two or more races. Hispanic or Latino of any race were 4.08% of the population.

There were 2,024 households, out of which 36.4% had children under the age of 18 living with them, 58.5% were married couples living together, 10.5% had a female householder with no husband present, and 26.2% were non-families. 21.7% of all households were made up of individuals, and 7.9% had someone living alone who was 65 years of age or older. The average household size was 2.68 and the average family size was 3.13.

In the city the population was spread out, with 26.8% under the age of 18, 8.7% from 18 to 24, 29.9% from 25 to 44, 23.8% from 45 to 64, and 10.7% who were 65 years of age or older. The median age was 36 years. For every 100 females, there were 95.9 males. For every 100 females age 18 and over, there were 96.4 males.

The median income for a household in the city was $51,071, and the median income for a family was $55,642. Males had a median income of $41,004 versus $27,025 for females. The per capita income for the city was $20,967. About 6.5% of families and 10.2% of the population were below the poverty line, including 14.7% of those under age 18 and 6.4% of those age 65 or over.

== Education ==
=== Primary-Secondary Education ===
The following schools fall within the jurisdictional boundaries of the City of Northwood:

- Northwood High School (grades 7-12), 600 Lemoyne Rd, Northwood (419-691-3888).
- Northwood Elementary School (grades PK-6), 600 Lemoyne Rd, Northwood (419-691-3888).

Northwood High School is a public high school in Northwood. It is the only high school in the Northwood Local School District. The current Northwood High School is located in Northwood Schools built in 2017. At the end of the 2006–2007 school year, Northwood was awarded an "Excellent" rating by the state of Ohio in education. The graduation rate of the school district was just over the state minimum (90%), coming in at 90.5%. The overall attendance average of the district was also over the state minimum (93%) at 95.9%. The district also met the standards on the adequate yearly progress (AYP) in all six categories.
