= Hilltop High School (Ohio) =

Public school in Ohio, United States

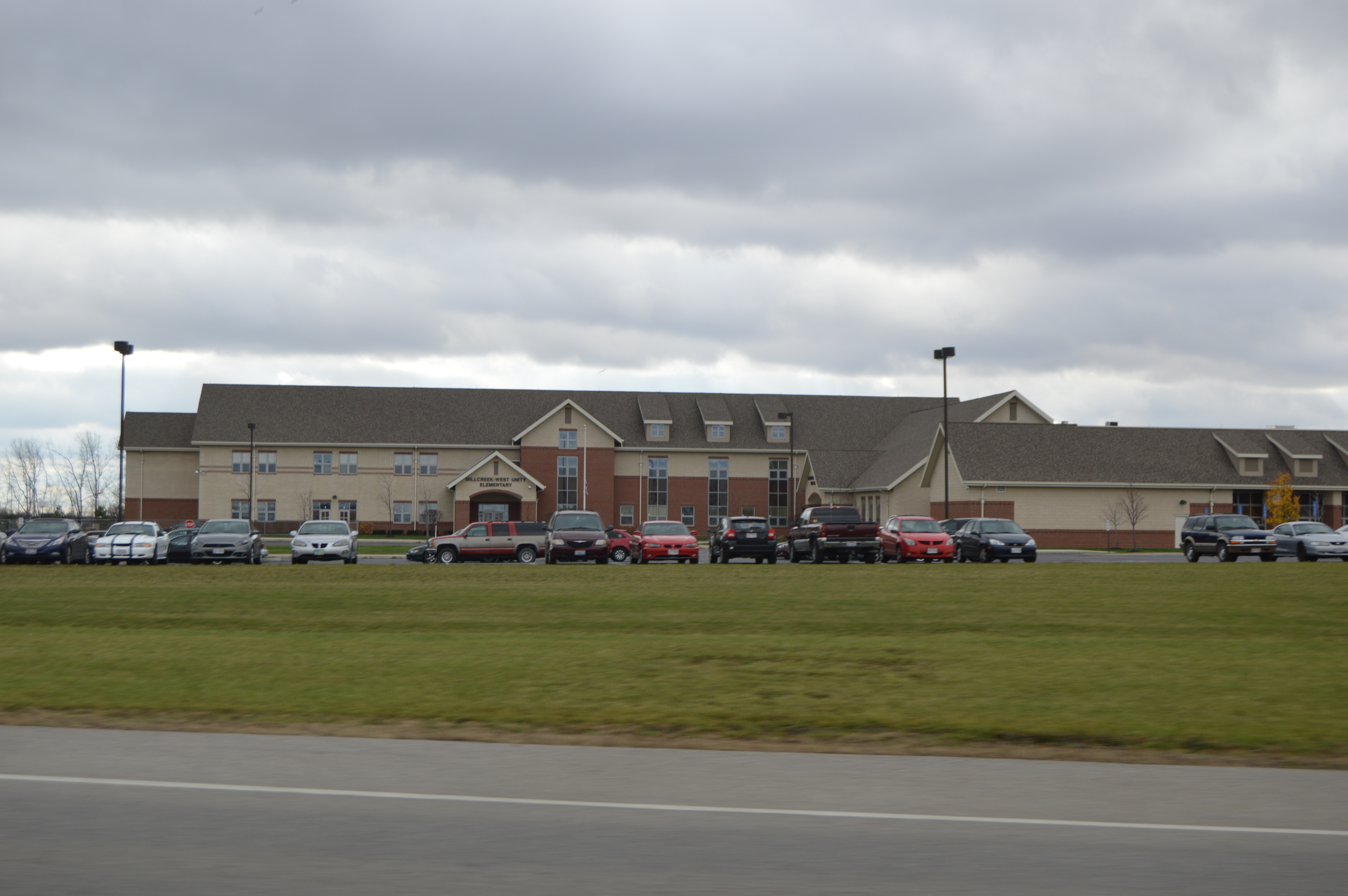
- Front of the school

Location
- 1401 West Jackson; West Unity, (Williams County), Ohio 43570; United States; 41°35′06″N 84°26′09″W

Information
- Type: Public, Coeducational high school
- School district: Millcreek-West Unity Local School District
- Superintendent: Larry Long
- Principal: Steven Riley
- Teaching staff: 20.75 (FTE)
- Grades: 7-12
- Student to teacher ratio: 10.22
- Colors: Red & White
- Athletics conference: Buckeye Border Conference, Great Lakes Conference (football-only)
- Nickname: Cadets
- National ranking: Bronze Rating -- 2018 U.S. News & World Report
- Athletic Director: Tony Gerig
- Website: www.hilltop.k12.oh.us/highschool_home.aspx

Hilltop High School is a public high school in West Unity, Ohio. It is the only high school in the Millcreek-West Unity Local Schools district. Their nickname is the Cadets. They are members of the Buckeye Border Conference and, for football only, the Great Lakes Conference.

== Ohio High School Athletic Association State Championships ==
- Girls Volleyball – 1991
