= Maumee Valley Country Day School =

Private high school in Toledo, Ohio, US

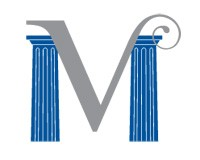

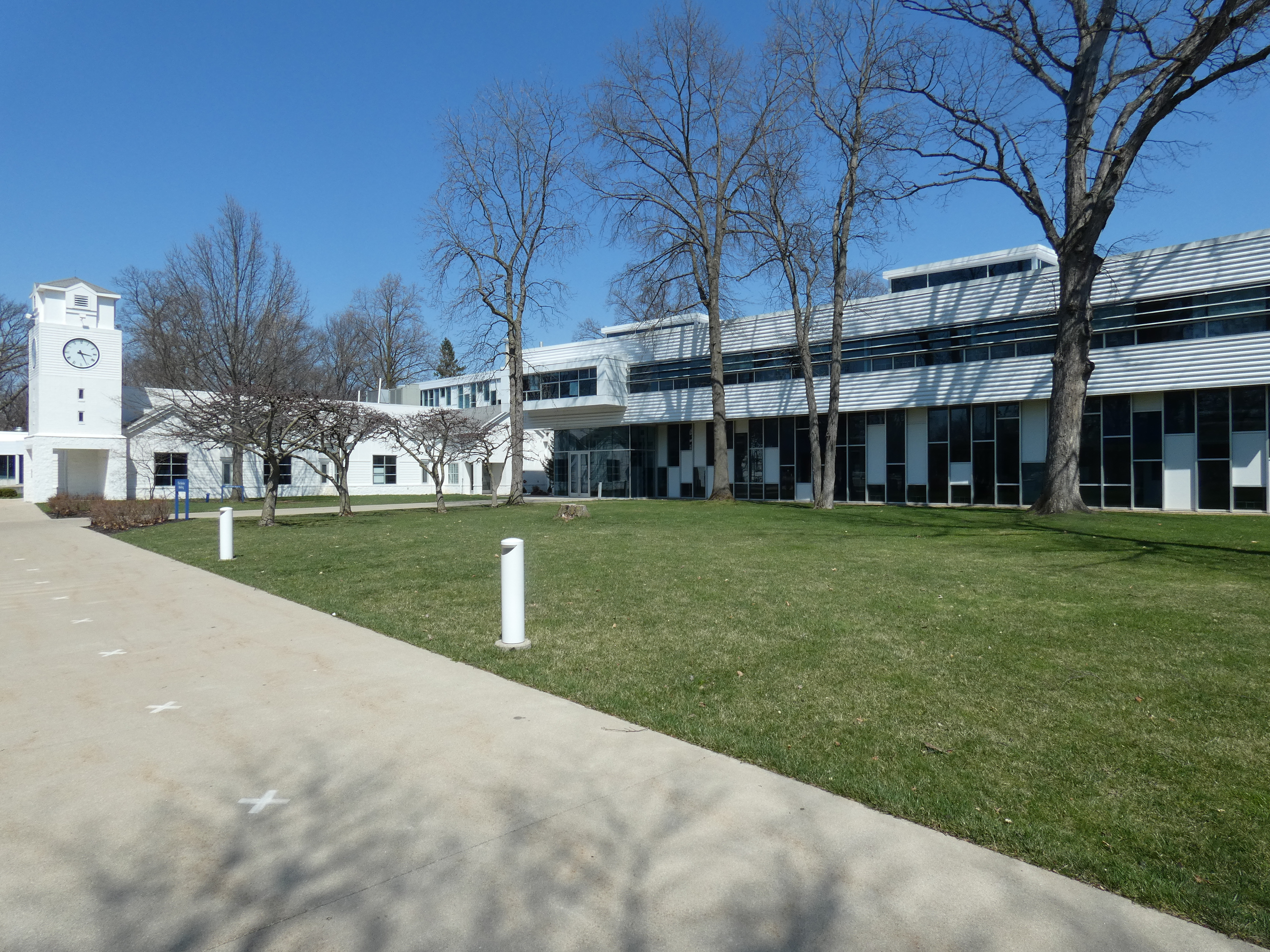
- School's main campus

Location
- 1715 South Reynolds Road; Toledo, (Lucas County), Ohio 43614; United States
- 41°36′27″N 83°39′43″W

Information
- Type: Private, Coeducational high school
- Motto: Touchstones: Respect, Kindness, Participation and Responsibility
- Established: 1842
- Head of school: Lynn Casto
- Head of Upper School: Stephanie Harmon
- Grades: PreK–12
- Campus size: 72 acres (290,000 m^{2})
- Colors: Royal and White
- Athletics conference: Toledo Area Athletic Conference
- Mascot: Hawks
- Team name: Hawks
- Accreditation: North Central Association of Colleges and Schools
- Head of Middle School: Angela McCray-Hancock
- Head of Lower School: Robin Wheeler
- Director of Advancement and Strategy: Amy Yustick
- Website: www.mvcds.org

Maumee Valley Country Day School (or MVCDS, Maumee Valley or MV) is an independent, co-ed, and non-religious private school in Toledo, Ohio. The school was founded in 1842 as an all-girls finishing school in Western New York and moved to Toledo in 1884, where it became The Smead School for Girls. The school became coeducational and adopted its present location and name in the early 1930s.

Today, MVCDS has approximately 500 students from PreKindergarten through 12th grade. It is accredited by ISACS and NAIS. The school gets its name of "Maumee Valley" from the nearby Maumee River, which flows north through Lucas County and Toledo, finally emptying into Lake Erie.

== Site history ==
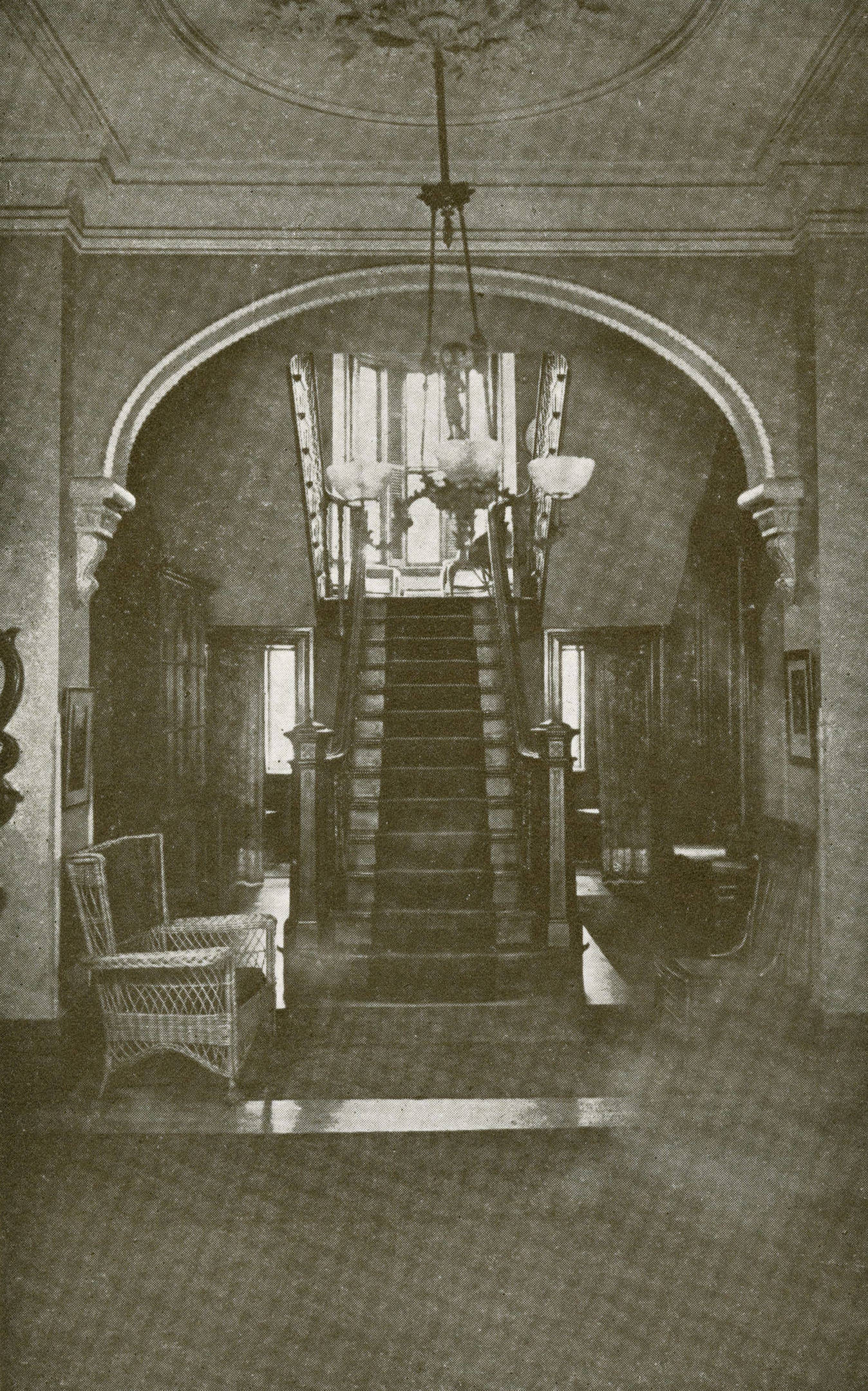
The front hall for the Smead School for Girls

Maumee Valley Country Day School was founded in New York as Miss Bryan's Seminary, a highly regarded finishing and boarding school for girls. The school relocated to the Toledo area in 1884 and became The Smead School for Girls, run by Miss Smead In 1934, the school relocated to its current location on South Reynolds Road in Toledo, Ohio with the construction of the Smead Building, and became a co-ed school. In 1959, a new building to house the upper school was built near the Smead Building on the campus. In 1972, the current lower and middle school building was completed next to the upper school building; they are connected by a hallway known as the "International Hall". A large dining hall and kitchen were added in the area between the two buildings. In 1984, a new science center was added to the upper school classrooms. In 1988, a 400m running track was built next to the sports fields by Glendale Avenue. In 1991, the Wolfe Gallery was constructed next to the Smead Building to showcase student and professional art projects that were displayed at the school. In 1997, a new area known as the "Johnson Bayer Physical Education Complex" was added. This included new sports offices, a weight training room, and a new gymnasium that were added next to the existing upper school gym. The middle school was expanded with additional classrooms as well as a science lab, and the 300 seat "Millennium Theatre" and lobby were built next to the dining hall. A large clock tower was built next to the new theatre lobby, establishing a central location on the campus. In addition, the road on campus was extended to Glendale Avenue to provide a second entrance/exit and a parking lot was added next to the new gymnasium. In 2007, new outdoor adventure course challenges were built throughout the woods on the campus. They include both low and high ropes course challenges for students. In 2009, a renovation project began to rebuild the upper school building and connect all of the campus buildings under one roof. Maumee Valley is also home to the Dayal House, a boarding school for international students. This $1.6 million project was designed in order to create a family-like atmosphere for the international students living there.

The school has had a variety of headmistresses and headmasters over the years. Gary Boehm was the head of school from 2006 to 2018. Lynn Casto assumed the role in July, 2018.

== Awards and honors ==
In July 2023, it was announced that readers of Toledo Area Parent News had voted Maumee Valley Country Day School as their "Favorite Private School" in the 2022 Family Favorites contest.

In April 2023, the Lower School received the 2023 "Eco Elementary School Award" for its ongoing efforts to expand the use of nature in its classrooms and extracurricular activities. The annual award recognizes a preschool, kindergarten, or elementary school for promoting environmental understanding and respect throughout the study body. It is awarded by the Science Alliance for Valuing the Environment (S.A.V.E.), a nonprofit organization at Lourdes University that serves the Toledo region with sustainability-focused programs.

== Renovation ==
By the mid-2000s, it became clear that the existing Upper School building, which was approaching 50 years of age, was too small and poorly heated/cooled to meet the needs of students. In 2007, a massive capital campaign was launched to rebuild the Upper School buildings. During the summer of 2009, the Upper School commons area was demolished and construction on the foundation for a new building began. The old Upper School classrooms were demolished in March 2011.

Another part of the plan included connecting the buildings to make traversing the campus easier. The plan included a connector that joined all buildings through the addition of an enclosed hallway between the Lower School and Smead buildings, giving students access to every building without traveling outside. The balcony area around the Dining Hall was enclosed in glass as well. The Smead Building, which is also the oldest structure on campus, was renovated to house the entire early childhood (Preschool-Kindergarten) program. Finally, a small roof was added next to the drop-off area to protect students from bad weather while they wait for buses or carpools. The entire operation, known as the "Under One Roof" project, totaled over $15 million.

The new building was designed by the parents of one of the students. It is considerably larger than the previous Upper School, with an average of 25 percent more floorspace per classroom. It was placed on the footprint of the old Upper School commons room and contains two floors. The new building incorporates natural lighting to reduce energy consumption.

== Athletics ==
The school is a member of the Ohio High School Athletic Association (OHSAA) and competes in the 10-school Toledo Area Athletic Conference (TAAC). The school has co-ed teams in eight sports at the varsity and junior varsity levels, including track and field, field hockey, tennis, soccer, golf, lacrosse, basketball, and swimming. The school used to have a football team, but it was canceled in the late 1970s. In the 2005-06 school year, 13 student-athletes were named All-State and three were recruited for Division I athletics.

== Notable students and alumni ==
- Thomas L. Ashley, congressional representative
- Sean B. Carroll, evolutionary developmental biologist, author, educator and executive producer
- Carty Finkbeiner, three-term mayor of Toledo
- Phil Griffin, president, MSNBC
- Zuri Hall, television personality, co-anchor, E! News
- Pat Lindsey, professional golfer, winner of 1983 PGA Tour event - B.C. Open
- Michelle Rhee, Former Chancellor, District of Columbia Public Schools, and founder and former president of the New Teacher Project
- Alyson Stoner, Actress, Cheaper by the Dozen (2003 film), Camp Rock
- Rachel J. Watkins, Anthropologist and Educator
