= West Unity, Ohio =

- Village
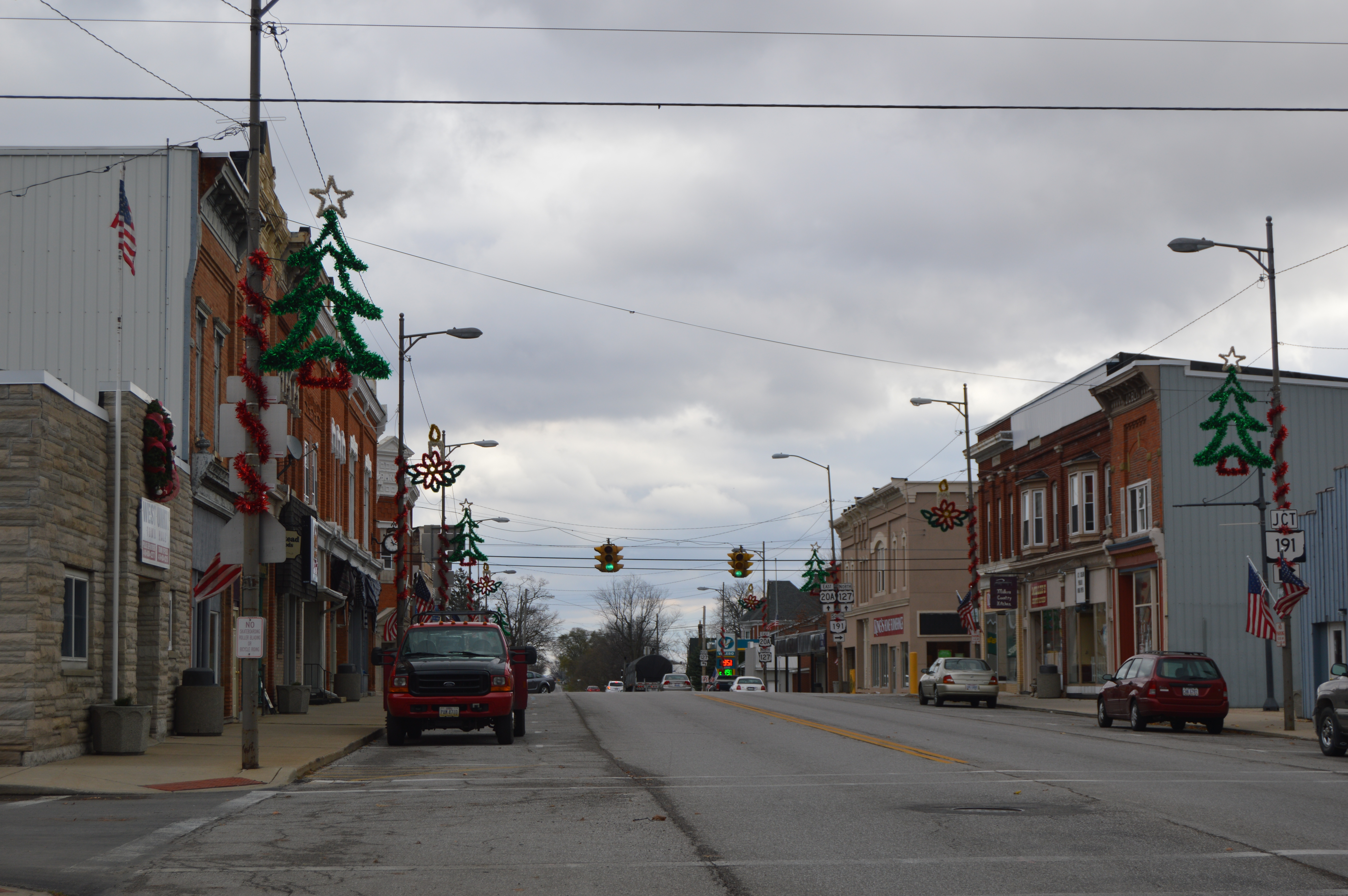
- Jackson Street downtown

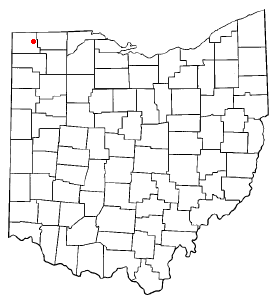
- Location of West Unity, Ohio

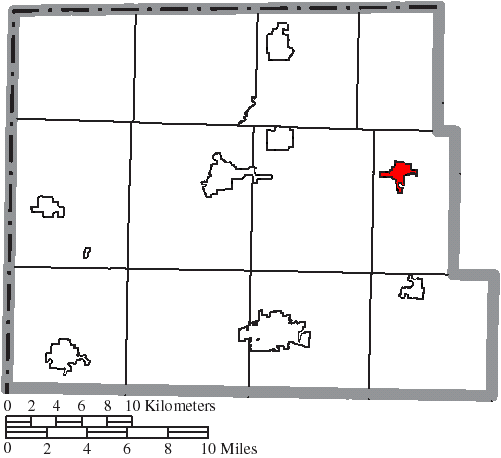
- Location of West Unity in Williams County
- Coordinates: 41°35′20″N 84°25′49″W
- Country: United States
- State: Ohio
- County: Williams

Area
  - Total: 1.54 sq mi (3.99 km^{2})
  - Land: 1.54 sq mi (3.99 km^{2})
  - Water: 0 sq mi (0.00 km^{2})
- Elevation: 797 ft (243 m)

Population (2020)
  - Total: 1,763
  - Density: 1,145.4/sq mi (442.25/km^{2})
- Time zone: UTC-5 (Eastern (EST))
  - Summer (DST): UTC-4 (EDT)
- ZIP code: 43570
- Area code: 419
- FIPS code: 39-84308
- GNIS feature ID: 2400147
- Website: http://www.westunity.org/

West Unity is a village in Williams County, Ohio, United States. The population was 1,763 at the 2020 census.

== History ==
West Unity was platted in 1842. A post office has been in operation at West Unity since 1842. The village was incorporated in 1866.

== Geography ==
According to the United States Census Bureau, the village has a total area of 1.17 square miles (3.03 km^{2}), all land.

== Demographics ==
Historical population
Census	Pop.	Note	%±
1870	537		—
1880	881		64.1%
1890	872		−1.0%
1900	897		2.9%
1910	980		9.3%
1920	906		−7.6%
1930	825		−8.9%
1940	920		11.5%
1950	827		−10.1%
1960	1,192		44.1%
1970	1,589		33.3%
1980	1,639		3.1%
1990	1,677		2.3%
2000	1,790		6.7%
2010	1,671		−6.6%
2020	1,763		5.5%
U.S. Decennial Census

=== 2010 census ===
As of the census of 2010, there were 1,671 people, 699 households, and 447 families living in the village. The population density was 1,428.2 inhabitants per square mile (551.4/km^{2}). There were 798 housing units at an average density of 682.1 per square mile (263.4/km^{2}). The racial makeup of the village was 95.9% White, 0.5% African American, 0.2% Native American, 0.6% Asian, 1.3% from other races, and 1.4% from two or more races. Hispanic or Latino of any race were 3.7% of the population.

There were 699 households, of which 34.3% had children under the age of 18 living with them, 48.1% were married couples living together, 12.0% had a female householder with no husband present, 3.9% had a male householder with no wife present, and 36.1% were non-families. 32.0% of all households were made up of individuals, and 12.4% had someone living alone who was 65 years of age or older. The average household size was 2.37 and the average family size was 3.00.

The median age in the village was 36.3 years. 27% of residents were under the age of 18; 8% were between the ages of 18 and 24; 26.1% were from 25 to 44; 26.1% were from 45 to 64; and 13% were 65 years of age or older. The gender makeup of the village was 48.2% male and 51.8% female.

=== 2000 census ===
As of the census of 2000, there were 1,790 people, 733 households, and 477 families living in the village. The population density was 1,732.9 inhabitants per square mile (669.1/km^{2}). There were 763 housing units at an average density of 738.7 per square mile (285.2/km^{2}). The racial makeup of the village was 97.21% White, 0.39% African American, 0.45% Native American, 0.22% Asian, 0.89% from other races, and 0.84% from two or more races. Hispanic or Latino of any race were 3.13% of the population.

There were 733 households, out of which 34.1% had children under the age of 18 living with them, 51.2% were married couples living together, 10.4% had a female householder with no husband present, and 34.8% were non-families. 30.8% of all households were made up of individuals, and 13.0% had someone living alone who was 65 years of age or older. The average household size was 2.43 and the average family size was 3.04.

In the village, the population was spread out, with 28.6% under the age of 18, 10.2% from 18 to 24, 28.8% from 25 to 44, 19.2% from 45 to 64, and 13.2% who were 65 years of age or older. The median age was 34 years. For every 100 females there were 95.4 males. For every 100 females age 18 and over, there were 90.7 males.

The median income for a household in the village was $35,250, and the median income for a family was $42,455. Males had a median income of $31,934 versus $21,058 for females. The per capita income for the village was $16,950. About 6.2% of families and 8.0% of the population were below the poverty line, including 10.7% of those under age 18 and 8.2% of those age 65 or over.

== Government ==
- Mayor- Don Leu
- Village Administrator- Josh Fritsch
- Fiscal Officer- Sarah Higdon
- Deputy Clerk- Aubrey Jennings
- Police Chief- J.R. Jones
- Council- President Kevin Gray, Scott Dunson, Steve Marvin, Terri LeBowsky, Randy Mahlman, and Shawn Blaisdell.

== Education ==
West Unity is home to the Millcreek-West Unity School district, serving the K-12 educational needs for the residents of Alvordton and West Unity. This system includes Hilltop High School and Hilltop Elementary. Both schools are connected on the same campus. Hilltop High School is partnered with Four County Career Center and Northwest State Community College. Upon reaching junior year, a student may attend either of these institutions.

West Unity has a public library, a branch of the Williams County Public Library.
