= Stryker, Ohio =

- Village
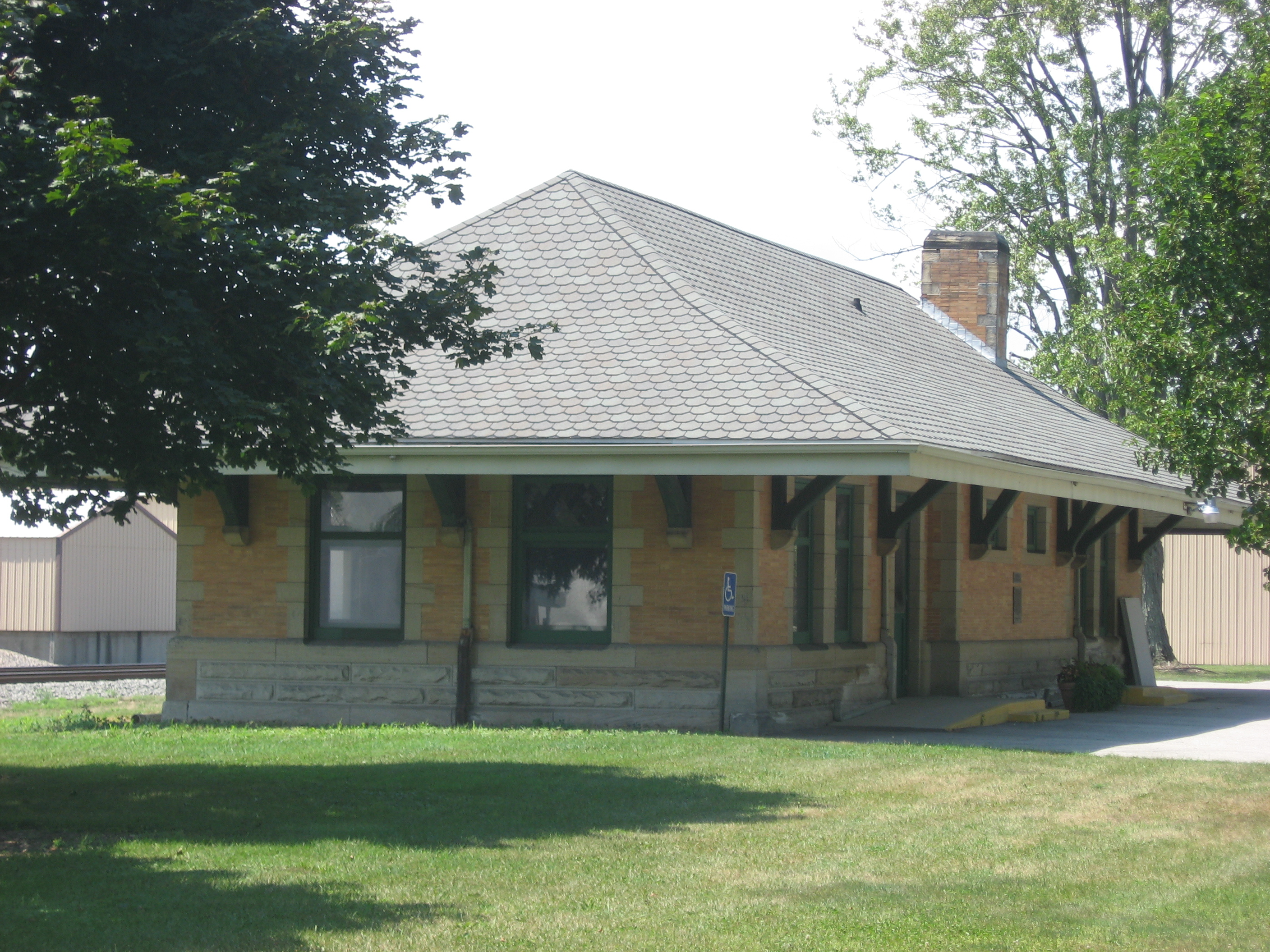
- Stryker's former rail depot
- Motto: "where you make the difference!"
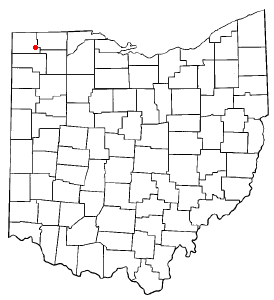
- Location of Stryker, Ohio

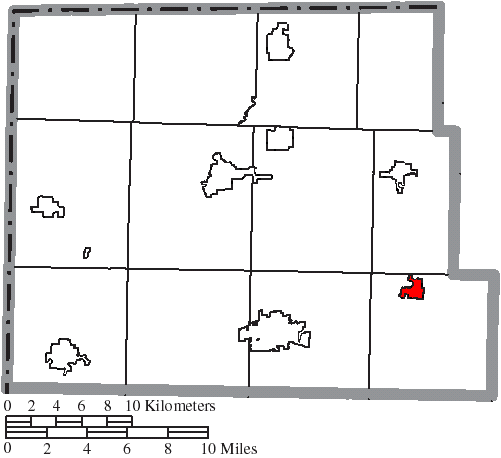
- Location of Stryker in Williams County
- Coordinates: 41°30′00″N 84°25′05″W
- Country: United States
- State: Ohio
- County: Williams

Area
  - Total: 0.90 sq mi (2.32 km^{2})
  - Land: 0.90 sq mi (2.32 km^{2})
  - Water: 0 sq mi (0.00 km^{2})
- Elevation: 719 ft (219 m)

Population (2020)
  - Total: 1,259
  - Density: 1,407.4/sq mi (543.39/km^{2})
- Time zone: UTC-5 (Eastern (EST))
  - Summer (DST): UTC-4 (EDT)
- ZIP code: 43557
- Area code: 419
- FIPS code: 39-75140
- GNIS feature ID: 2399922
- Website: https://www.villageofstryker.com/

Stryker is a village in Williams County, Ohio, United States. The population was 1,259 at the 2020 census.

== History ==
Stryker was platted in 1853. The village was named for John Stryker, a railroad promoter. A post office has been in operation at Stryker since 1855.

From 1901 to 1939, Stryker was the operation center for the Toledo and Indiana Railway, an interurban and electric company that began operation between Toledo and Stryker in 1901, with an extension west to Bryan, Ohio, in 1905. The construction of a power plant near the Tiffin River for the electrified railway in 1905 helped bring power to a large portion of northwest Ohio.

On July 23, 1966, Stryker was one of the end points of a record-setting speed run by a New York Central RDC-3, M-497 Black Beetle, modified with a pair of jet engines, as the rail line between it and Butler, Indiana, was both straight and flat. The car reached a speed of 183.68 mph (295.6 km/h), an American rail speed record that still stands today.

== Geography ==
According to the United States Census Bureau, the village has a total area of 0.88 square miles (2.28 km^{2}), of which 0.87 square miles (2.25 km^{2}) is land and 0.01 square miles (0.03 km^{2}) is water.

== Demographics ==
Historical population
Census	Pop.	Note	%±
1870	671		—
1880	662		−1.3%
1890	1,017		53.6%
1900	1,206		18.6%
1910	1,026		−14.9%
1920	1,014		−1.2%
1930	817		−19.4%
1940	929		13.7%
1950	1,026		10.4%
1960	1,205		17.4%
1970	1,296		7.6%
1980	1,423		9.8%
1990	1,468		3.2%
2000	1,406		−4.2%
2010	1,335		−5.0%
2020	1,259		−5.7%
U.S. Decennial Census

=== 2010 census ===
As of the census of 2010, there were 1,335 people, 524 households, and 348 families living in the village. The population density was 1,534.5 inhabitants per square mile (592.5/km^{2}). There were 602 housing units at an average density of 692.0 per square mile (267.2/km^{2}). The racial makeup of the village was 95.0% White, 0.4% African American, 0.4% Native American, 0.2% Asian, 1.9% from other races, and 2.1% from two or more races. Hispanic or Latino of any race were 8.4% of the population.

There were 524 households, of which 36.6% had children under the age of 18 living with them, 48.3% were married couples living together, 13.0% had a female householder with no husband present, 5.2% had a male householder with no wife present, and 33.6% were non-families. 27.7% of all households were made up of individuals, and 11.1% had someone living alone who was 65 years of age or older. The average household size was 2.55 and the average family size was 3.09.

The median age in the village was 34.7 years. 27.2% of residents were under the age of 18; 10.5% were between the ages of 18 and 24; 25.7% were from 25 to 44; 23.6% were from 45 to 64; and 12.7% were 65 years of age or older. The gender makeup of the village was 49.5% male and 50.5% female.

=== 2000 census ===
As of the census of 2000, there were 1,406 people, 542 households, and 391 families living in the village. The population density was 1,736.2 inhabitants per square mile (670.4/km^{2}). There were 577 housing units at an average density of 712.5 per square mile (275.1/km^{2}). The racial makeup of the village was 94.74% White, 0.14% African American, 0.14% Native American, 0.14% Asian, 3.56% from other races, and 1.28% from two or more races. Hispanic or Latino of any race were 8.82% of the population.

There were 542 households, out of which 40.0% had children under the age of 18 living with them, 56.1% were married couples living together, 11.1% had a female householder with no husband present, and 27.7% were non-families. 24.2% of all households were made up of individuals, and 10.3% had someone living alone who was 65 years of age or older. The average household size was 2.59 and the average family size was 3.07.

In the village, the population was spread out, with 30.6% under the age of 18, 8.3% from 18 to 24, 29.7% from 25 to 44, 19.1% from 45 to 64, and 12.4% who were 65 years of age or older. The median age was 33 years. For every 100 females there were 92.1 males. For every 100 females age 18 and over, there were 89.1 males.

The median income for a household in the village was $39,946, and the median income for a family was $44,453. Males had a median income of $30,643 versus $21,743 for females. The per capita income for the village was $16,371. About 4.0% of families and 5.4% of the population were below the poverty line, including 5.4% of those under age 18 and 5.5% of those age 65 or over.

== Education ==
Stryker Public Schools are part of the Stryker Local School District. There is one elementary school and one high school in the district. Students attend Stryker High School.

Stryker has a public library, a branch of the Williams County Public Library.

== Notable person ==
- Caril Ann Fugate, accomplice of spree killer Charles Starkweather.
