= Edon High School =

Location
- 802 W Indiana St, Edon, (Williams County), Ohio 43518; United States; 41°33′28″N 84°46′53″W

Information
- Type: Public, Coeducational high school
- Superintendent: Anthony Stevens
- Principal: Kayla Lapham
- Teaching staff: 14.05 (FTE)
- Grades: 9-12
- Student to teacher ratio: 15.87
- Colors: Blue & Silver
- Athletics conference: Buckeye Border Conference, Great Lakes Conference (football-only)
- Nickname: Bombers
- Athletic Director: Matt Ripke
- Website: https://sites.google.com/edon-nw.org/wv2/jr-sr-high?authuser=0

Edon High School is a public high school in Edon, Ohio. It is the only high school in the Edon Northwest Local Schools district. Their nickname is the Bombers, which was chosen after being suggested in a naming contest by Charles Brigle (class of 1938) while a freshman at EHS. They are primarily members of the Buckeye Border Conference, but compete in the Great Lakes Conference for football.
