= Ottawa – Glandorf Local School District =

School district in Ohio, United States

Address
- 630 Glendale Avenue Ottawa, Ohio, 45875; United States
- Coordinates: 41°1′28″N 84°2′43″W

District information
- Type: Public
- Grades: KG–12
- Superintendent: Don Horstman
- Schools: 3
- NCES District ID: 3904937

Students and staff
- Students: 1,500 (2024–2025)
- Teachers: 91.83 (on an FTE basis) (2024–2025)
- Staff: 181.35 (on an FTE basis) (2024–2025)
- Student–teacher ratio: 16.33 (2024–2025)

Other information
- Website: www.ottawaglandorf.org

Ottawa – Glandorf Local School District, is headquartered in eastern Putnam County, Ohio in the United States. The district serves students from the villages of Glandorf and Ottawa as well as parts of Blanchard, Greensburg, Liberty, Pleasant and Union Townships and all of Ottawa Township.

The Ottawa – Glandorf Local School District is the largest local school district in Putnam County, of which Ottawa is the county seat. The school district is located in Northwest Ohio, about one hour and fifteen minutes (65 miles (105 km)) southwest of Toledo and a little over two hours (125 miles (201 km)) southwest of Detroit.

Kevin Brinkman was the superintendent of the school district from 2004 to 2014. Brinkman ended his 10-year tenure as superintendent and retired from his position on July 31, 2014. On May 17, 2014, the Ottawa-Glandorf school board hired Donald Horstman, former superintendent of Kalida Local Schools, as its next superintendent. Horstman also previously served as Kalida High School principal and Glenwood Middle School (Findlay) assistant principal. He assumed his duties as superintendent on August 1, 2014

== Schools ==
	P-K	K	1	2	3	4	5	6	7	8	9	10	11	12
Columbus Grove	54	89	51	76	56	64	56	68	60	65	83	88	78	80
Columbus Grove St. Anthony's	0	0	15	20	20	20	23	26	21	26	0	0	0	0
Continental	5	51	39	39	50	50	43	38	41	50	52	62	52	58
Jennings	4	39	27	17	32	30	20	39	25	33	36	19	43	46
Kalida	5	46	38	52	52	59	48	50	63	55	51	59	52	62
Leipsic	11	51	70	43	31	31	33	37	45	44	52	76	73	61
Leipsic St. Mary's	0	12	12	22	25	18	20	21	21	22	0	0	0	0
Miller City-New Cleveland	20	43	46	36	39	39	21	43	40	34	39	35	32	40
Ottawa-Glandorf*	93	126	126	130	140	68	122	162	151	74	157	165	135	144
Ottoville	8	23	48	23	30	29	40	50	45	50	48	56	53	58
Pandora-Gilboa	5	44	48	37	41	46	40	30	52	46	48	53	63	57

*Ottawa – Glandorf Local School District operates the following schools:

=== High school ===
- Ottawa-Glandorf High School, in Ottawa (grades 9 through 12)

=== Elementary and Middle ===
- Ottawa Elementary School, in Ottawa (grades K through 8)
- Glandorf Elementary School, in Glandorf (grades K through 8)
- Sts. Peter and Paul Elementary School, in Ottawa (grades K through 8)

=== Preschool ===
- Titan TIKES Preschool, in Ottawa (Pre-K)
- Loving Care Learning Center, in Ottawa (Pre-K)
- Trinity Preschool, in Ottawa (Pre-K)
- St. John the Baptist Catholic Preschool, in Glandorf (Pre-K)

== Mascots ==
The Ottawa-Glandorf High School mascot, along with the Ottawa Elementary mascot, is the Titans and the Glandorf Elementary School mascot is the Dragons. The Sts. Peter and Paul Elementary mascot is the Knights. Before merging, Ottawa High School's mascot was the Indians.

== Superintendent and School Board ==
Don Horstman is the superintendent of the Ottawa-Glandorf Local School District and has been since August 1, 2014.

As of 2024, the members of the Ottawa-Glandorf School Board are:

- Beth Hempfling, President (3rd Term 2024-2027)
- Tom VonSossan, Vice President (1st Term 2022-2025)
- Brent Schroeder, Board Member (3rd Term 2024-2027)
- David Dalrymple, Board Member (3rd Term 2022-2025)
- Lucy Cramer, Board Member (3rd Term 2024-2027)

== Sports ==
The school district is and remains part of the Western Buckeye League of northwestern Ohio. The three elementary schools (grades 7-8) compete within the Putnam County League as separate schools. When consolidated together in some sports, they also compete within the Western Buckeye League. The Titans compete in the following sports:

- Basketball
- Cheerleading
- Football
- Cross Country
- Track
- Soccer
- Baseball
- Softball
- Golf
- Tennis
- Volleyball
- Wrestling
- Swimming
- Bowling

== Athletes ==
1. Tim Pollitz 01-04 Miami (OH) 2. Eric Pollitz 01-04 Miami (OH)

=== WBL Championships ===
Sport	Championship Year
Boys Basketball	77, 82, 85, 86, 87, 88, 96, 97, 98, 00, 01, 02, 03, 04, 09, 16
Girls Basketball	88, 89, 90, 03, 04, 05, 06, 16
Boys Track	67, 69, 70, 71, 72, 77, 78, 13, 14
Girls Tennis	87, 88, 89, 90, 92, 93, 97
Girls Track	80, 04, 05, 06, 07
Football	02, 05, 07, 12, 16
Girls Soccer	00, 02, 10, 14
Boys Soccer	98, 99, 08, 12, 15
Baseball	80, 82, 14
Wrestling	72, 73
Volleyball	04, 06, 07, 12, 13, 14, 15
Boys Tennis	04
Boys Cross Country	85
Girls Swimming	14, 16

=== State Appearances ===
Sport	State Years (*for title, 'r' for second)
Boys Basketball	77, 78, 96r, 04*, 08*, 12, 13*
Boys Track	71r, 72*
Girls Track	02*, 05
Baseball	79, 81
Football	09
Boys Soccer	98
Golf	97
Girls Soccer	14r
Girls Basketball	15r, 16r

== Recent Building Changes ==
The Ottawa-Glandorf High School was expanded and renovated in late 2004 and early 2005. This was Phase I of construction for the district.

In early May 2008, the Ohio School Facilities Commission advised Ottawa-Glandorf schools that the funding for Phase II of their building project is forthcoming. The Ottawa-Glandorf school board decided to proceed with the master plan approved in 2002. This plan included the construction of two new elementary buildings.

The construction of the Ottawa building was designed for 450 students and the Glandorf building for 500 students. The Ohio School Facilities Commission supported any building with a student population over 350 to be considered operationally efficient.

The school board hopes to have a bond levy on the November ballot.
