= Ottawa-Glandorf High School =

School in Ottawa, Ohio, United States

Location
- 630 Glendale Avenue; Ottawa, Ohio; Ottawa, (Putnam County), Ohio 45875; United States
- Coordinates: 41°01′43″N 84°02′44″W

Information
- School board: Becky Leader; David Dalrymple; Lucy Cramer; Beth Hempfling; Brent Schroeder
- School district: Ottawa-Glandorf Local
- Oversight: Putnam County ESC
- Dean: Kenneth Schriner
- Principal: Ann Ellerbrock
- Teaching staff: 27.83 (FTE)
- Grades: 9–12
- Student to teacher ratio: 20.27
- Campus: Rural
- Campus type: Public
- Colors: Navy and Gold
- Athletics conference: Western Buckeye League
- Team name: Titans
- Yearbook: Thunderbolt
- Website: oghs.ottawaglandorf.org

Ottawa-Glandorf High School, is a secondary school and only high school part of the Ottawa-Glandorf Local School District. The school is the largest in Putnam County. The school serves students who are in grades 9 through 12 from Glandorf and Ottawa as well as parts of Greensburg, Liberty, Ottawa, Pleasant and Union Townships.

Ottawa-Glandorf High School was designated "Excellent" or "Excellent with Distinction" (the highest designation given) by the Ohio Department of Education during the last 10 consecutive school years. The district met 24 of 24 state indicators with a 100% graduation rate in 2013.

== Athletics ==
Ottawa-Glandorf is a member of the Western Buckeye League. They are the only school in the county not part of the Putnam County League.

=== Ohio High School Athletic Association State Championships ===
- Boys Track and Field – 1972
- Girls Track and Field – 2002
- Boys Basketball – 2004, 2008, 2013

=== OHSAA State Runner-Up ===
- Boys Track and Field – 1971
- Boys Basketball – 1996, 2022, 2023
- Girls Basketball - 2015, 2016, 2021, 2026
- Girls Soccer – 2014, 2021, 2022, 2023, 2024

=== OHSAA State Final Four ===
- Baseball - 1979
- Boys Basketball - 1977, 1978, 2012, 2021, 2024
- Football - 2009, 2021
- Boys Golf - 1997
- Boys Soccer - 1998
- Girls Track and Field - 2005, 2015
- Girls Soccer - 2025

=== OHSAA Regional Appearances ===
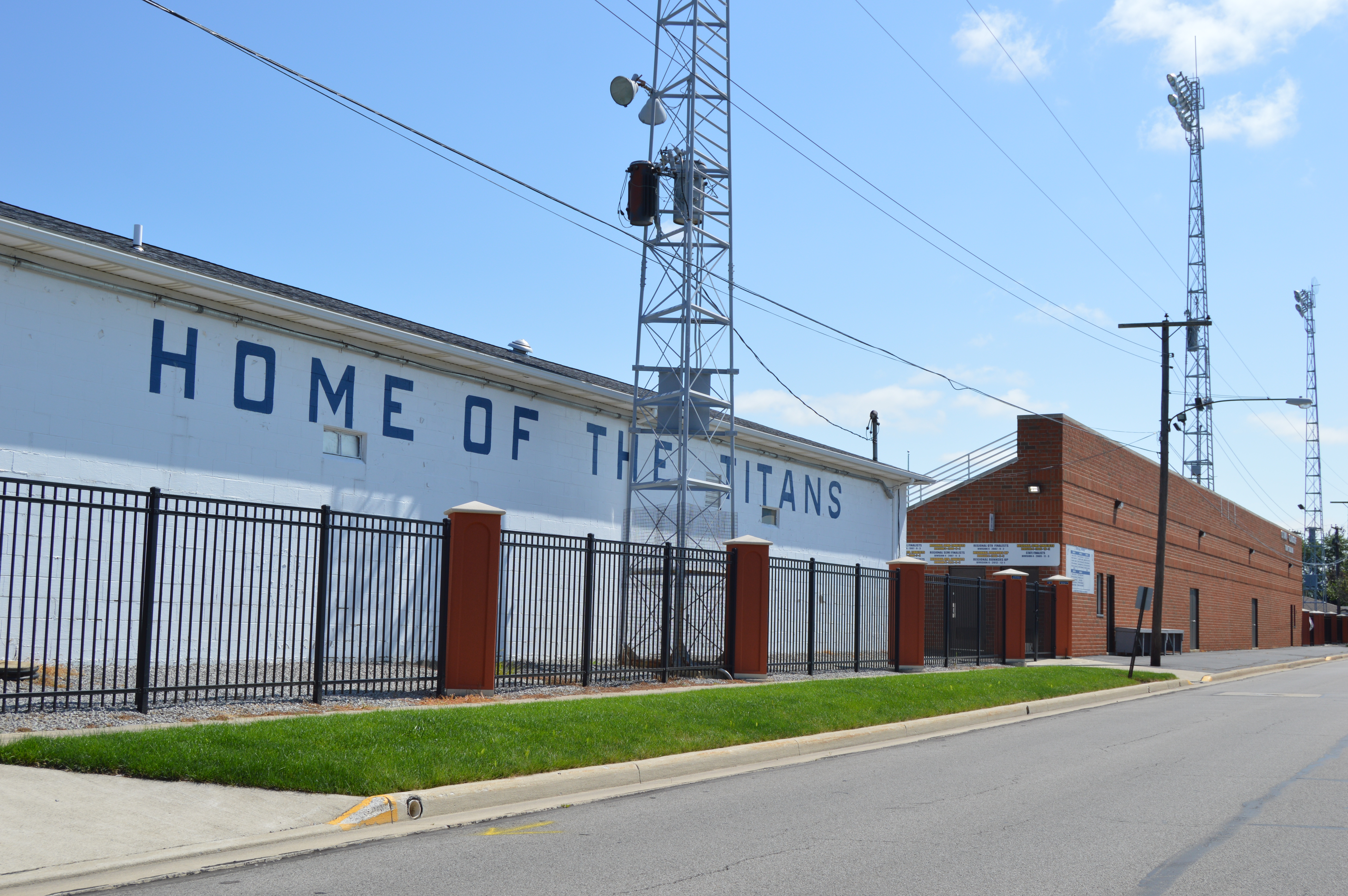
Football stadium from the street

- Baseball - 1979*
- Boys Basketball - 1977*, 1978*, 1988, 1995, 1996*, 1998, 2001, 2002, 2003, 2004*, 2008*, 2011, 2012*, 2013*, 2014, 2015, 2016
- Girls Basketball - 2003, 2005, 2007
- Boys Cross Country - 1994, 1999, 2000, 2010
- Girls Cross Country - 1995, 1996, 1997, 1998, 2001, 2007
- Boys Golf - 1997*
- Boys Soccer - 1998*, 2007, 2009 (regional finalist; lost to Doylestown Chippewa 3-2)
- Girls Soccer - 2000, 2001, 2002, 2006
- Boys Track and Field - 1971*, 1972*
- Girls Track and Field - 2002*, 2004, 2005*, 2006 (placed 1st at regionals these years)
- Football - 1997, 2000, 2002, 2005, 2006, 2007, 2008, 2009, 2010
- Volleyball - 2004, 2005, 2015

Key: * indicates state semi-finalist, state runner-up, or state champions
Note: Not all regional appearances are listed for every sport or every appearance for the sports listed.

==== Tournament notes ====
Boys Basketball 1996-2010:
In 1996, Ottawa-Glandorf fell in an overtime thriller to Orrville, 60-59, in the Division II state championship game. Ottawa-Glandorf lost to No. 2 Willard in the regional semi-final, 57-49 in 2001. In 2002, the Titans lost to Lebron James' No. 1 Akron St. Vincent-St. Mary team in the regional final, 77-58. Ottawa-Glandorf fell again to the same No. 1 ranked James dominated Akron St. Vincent-St. Mary team in 2003 in the regional final, 69-59. In 2004, they went on to capture their first Division II state championship defeating Canal Fulton Northwest, 75-42. Canal Fulton Northwest beat No. 9 Dayton Chaminade-Julienne, 65-61 in the state semi-final. In 2008, they captured the Division III state championship with a win over Sugarcreek Garaway. In 2009, they were only twice-beaten but lost to state-power Coldwater in the final minutes of the Division III district final. They lost narrowly to Lima Central Catholic in the 2010 district final.

Football 2008-2009:
In 2008, Ottawa-Glandorf's football team defeated No. 10 Marion Pleasant in OT to advance to the first regional final in school's history. They later fell to No. 4 Genoa Area, whom advanced to the state tournament. They advanced to their second straight regional championship game in 2009 after blowing past Eastwood 48-3. They later advanced to their first state semi-final game after knocking off Orrville, 21-20.

=== WBL Championships ===
Sport	Championship Year
Boys Basketball	1977, 1982, 1985, 1986, 1987, 1988, 1996, 1997, 1998, 2000, 2001, 2002, 2003, 2004, 2009
Girls Basketball	1988, 1989, 1990, 2003, 2004, 2005, 2006
Boys Track	1967, 1969, 1970, 1971, 1972, 1977, 1978
Girls Tennis	1987, 1988, 1989, 1990, 1992, 1993, 1997
Girls Track	1980, 2004, 2005, 2006, 2007
Boys Soccer	1998, 1999, 2008
Football	2002, 2005, 2007, 2015, 2016
Girls Soccer	2000, 2002, 2010, 2014, 2022, 2023
Baseball	1980, 1982
Wrestling	1972, 1973
Volleyball	2004, 2007
Boys Tennis	2004
Boys Cross Country	1985, 2022
Girls Cross Country	2022, 2023
Girls Swimming	2016, 2019, 2020, 2021, 2022, 2023, 2024

=== State tournament appearances ===
Sport	Years (*won state title, 'r' runner up)
Boys Basketball	1977, 1978, 1996r, 2004*, 2008*, 2012, 2013*, 2021, 2022r
Boys Track	1971r, 1972*
Football	2009
Girls Track	2002*
Baseball	1979
Golf	1997
Boys Soccer	1998
Girls Soccer	2014r, 2021r, 2022r, 2023r

== Notable alumni ==
- Larry Cox, Former MLB player (Philadelphia Phillies, Seattle Mariners, Chicago Cubs, Texas Rangers)
