= Ottoville Local School District =

School district in Ohio, United States

Address
- 650 West 3rd Street Ottoville, Ohio, 45876; United States
- Coordinates: 40°56′1″N 84°20′47″W

District information
- Type: Public
- Grades: KG–12
- Schools: 2
- NCES District ID: 3904938

Students and staff
- Students: 480 (2024–2025)
- Teachers: 31.80 (on an FTE basis) (2024–2025)
- Staff: 87.15 (on an FTE basis) (2024–2025)
- Student–teacher ratio: 15.09 (2024–2025)

Other information
- Website: www.ottovilleschools.org

Ottoville Local School District serves education to students in Ottoville, Putnam County, Ohio as well as Perry, Jackson, Jennings and Monterey townships in Putnam County, Ohio, which is located in the northwest corner of the state.

The superintendent is Scott Mangas, who took the position in 2008. Mr. Jon Thorbahn took over the High School Principal job, in 2008 replacing the retiring Wilbur Altenburger. Previous superintendents include: Ken Amstutz and Larry Moore. The following are members of the Board of Education, Sue Bendele, Kevin Landin, Kim Wannemacher, Barb Hoersten, and Craig Byrne. Mr. Bob Weber is the School Treasurer and Shelley Mumaw is the Director of Technology. Additional information can be found out about the school on the website at www.ottovilleschools.org

== Schools ==
These two schools make up only one school and is considered Ottoville Local School District. The school is located in Ottoville, but serves students from different townships across western Putnam County.

- Ottoville Elementary School, Ottoville, (Pre-Kindergarten - 6)
- Ottoville High School, Ottoville, (grades 7 - 12)

Ottoville Local School Mascot is the Big Green.
A Monthly Newsletter called Behind the Big Green Doors is published by the school district.
