= Harzburg (disambiguation) =

Harzburg may refer to various places in Germany:

- Harzburg, a former imperial castle (Kaiserburg) in the Harz
- Bad Harzburg, a town in Goslar District in Lower Saxony
- Herzburg, a former fort near Altenkirchen in the Westerwald

See also

- Harzburg Front
- Hartsburg (disambiguation)
