= Hartsburg =

Hartsburg may refer to:

== Places ==
- Hartsburg, Illinois, United States
- Hartsburg, Missouri, United States
- Hartsburg, Ohio, United States

== People with the surname ==
- Chris Hartsburg (born 1980), American ice hockey player and coach
- Craig Hartsburg, a retired Canadian professional hockey player and head coach

== See also ==
- Harburg (disambiguation)
- Hartberg, a city in Styria, Austria
- Harzburg, a former imperial castle overlooking Bad Harzburg, Lower Saxony, Germany
