= Ottoville High School =

Location
- 650 W. Third St. Ottoville, (Putnam County), Ohio 45876; United States
- Coordinates: 40°56′01″N 84°20′46″W

Information
- Type: Public, Coeducational high school
- Superintendent: Jarrod Wehri
- Principal: Jon Thorbahn
- Teaching staff: 16.42 (FTE)
- Grades: 7-12
- Student to teacher ratio: 12.91
- Colors: Green & Gold
- Athletics conference: Putnam County League
- Sports: Basketball, Baseball, Soccer, Track, Cross Country, Volleyball, Softball, Golf, Table Tennis, Lacrosse
- Mascot: Trojan
- Nickname: Big Green
- Team name: Big Green
- Rival: Kalida High School

Ottoville High School is a public high school in Ottoville, Ohio. It is the only high school in the Ottoville Local School district. Their nickname is the Big Green. They are a member of the Putnam County League.
