= Jennings Township, Ohio =

Jennings Township, Ohio, may refer to:

- Jennings Township, Putnam County, Ohio
- Jennings Township, Van Wert County, Ohio
