= Riley Township, Ohio =

Riley Township, Ohio may refer to:

- Riley Township, Putnam County, Ohio
- Riley Township, Sandusky County, Ohio
