= Dorninton, Ohio =

Unincorporated community in Ohio, U.S.

Coordinates: 41°01′14″N 84°13′02″W

Dorninton (also called Dornington) is an unincorporated community in Putnam County, in the U.S. state of Ohio.

== History ==
A post office called Dornington was established in 1892, and remained in operation until 1904. The community was located on a railroad line.
