= Cuba, Putnam County, Ohio =

Unincorporated community in Ohio, U.S.

Coordinates: 41°03′12″N 84°11′54″W

Cuba is an unincorporated community in Putnam County, in the U.S. state of Ohio.

== History ==
Cuba was a station on the railroad. The post office Cuba once had was called Sheridan. This post office was in operation from 1866 until 1892.
