= Muntanna, Ohio =

Unincorporated community in Ohio, U.S.

Coordinates: 40°58′33″N 84°18′04″W

Muntanna is an unincorporated community in Putnam County, in the U.S. state of Ohio.

== History ==
Muntanna was platted in 1884. A post office was in operation at Muntanna between 1880 and 1907.
