= Elm Center, Ohio =

Unincorporated community in Ohio, U.S.

Coordinates: 41°06′08″N 84°05′35″W

Elm Center is an unincorporated community in Putnam County, in the U.S. state of Ohio.

== History ==
Elm Center had its start as a station on the railroad. A post office called Elm Center was established in 1887 and remained in operation until 1903.
