= Townwood, Ohio =

Unincorporated community in Ohio, U.S.

Coordinates: 41°06′34″N 83°54′02″W

Townwood is an unincorporated community in Putnam County, in the U.S. state of Ohio.

== History ==
Townwood was platted in 1886. A post office called Townwood was established in 1891, and remained in operation until it was discontinued in 1926.
