= New Cleveland, Ohio =

Unincorporated community in Ohio, U.S.

Coordinates: 41°04′25″N 84°02′20″W

New Cleveland is an unincorporated community in Putnam County, in the U.S. state of Ohio.

== History ==
The post office New Cleveland once had was called Brickner. This post office was established in 1880, and remained in operation until 1901.

Holy Family Catholic Church (the inspiration for WJTA "Holy Family Radio") is located in New Cleveland on State Route 109.
