= Cascade, Ohio =

Former town in Ohio, U.S.

Coordinates: 41°01′15″N 84°17′20″W

Cascade is a former town in Putnam County, in the U.S. state of Ohio. The GNIS classifies it as a populated place.

== History ==
Cascade was platted in 1892. A post office was established at Cascade in 1893, and remained in operation until 1904. A large gristmill operated there, but after the mill closed there was little else to mark the site of the former community.
