= North Creek, Ohio =

Unincorporated community in Ohio, U.S.

Coordinates: 41°08′47″N 84°13′10″W

North Creek is an unincorporated community in Putnam County, in the U.S. state of Ohio.

== History ==
North Creek was platted in 1879 when the Clover Leaf Railroad was extended to that point. A post office was established at North Creek in 1879, and remained in operation until it was discontinued in 1957.
