= Douglas, Ohio =

Unincorporated community in Ohio, U.S.

Coordinates: 40°56′32″N 84°18′03″W

Douglas is an unincorporated community in Putnam County, in the U.S. state of Ohio.

== History ==
A post office called Douglas was established in 1880, and remained in operation until 1907. The town site was not officially platted.
