= Van Buren Township, Putnam County, Ohio =

Township in Ohio, US

- Township
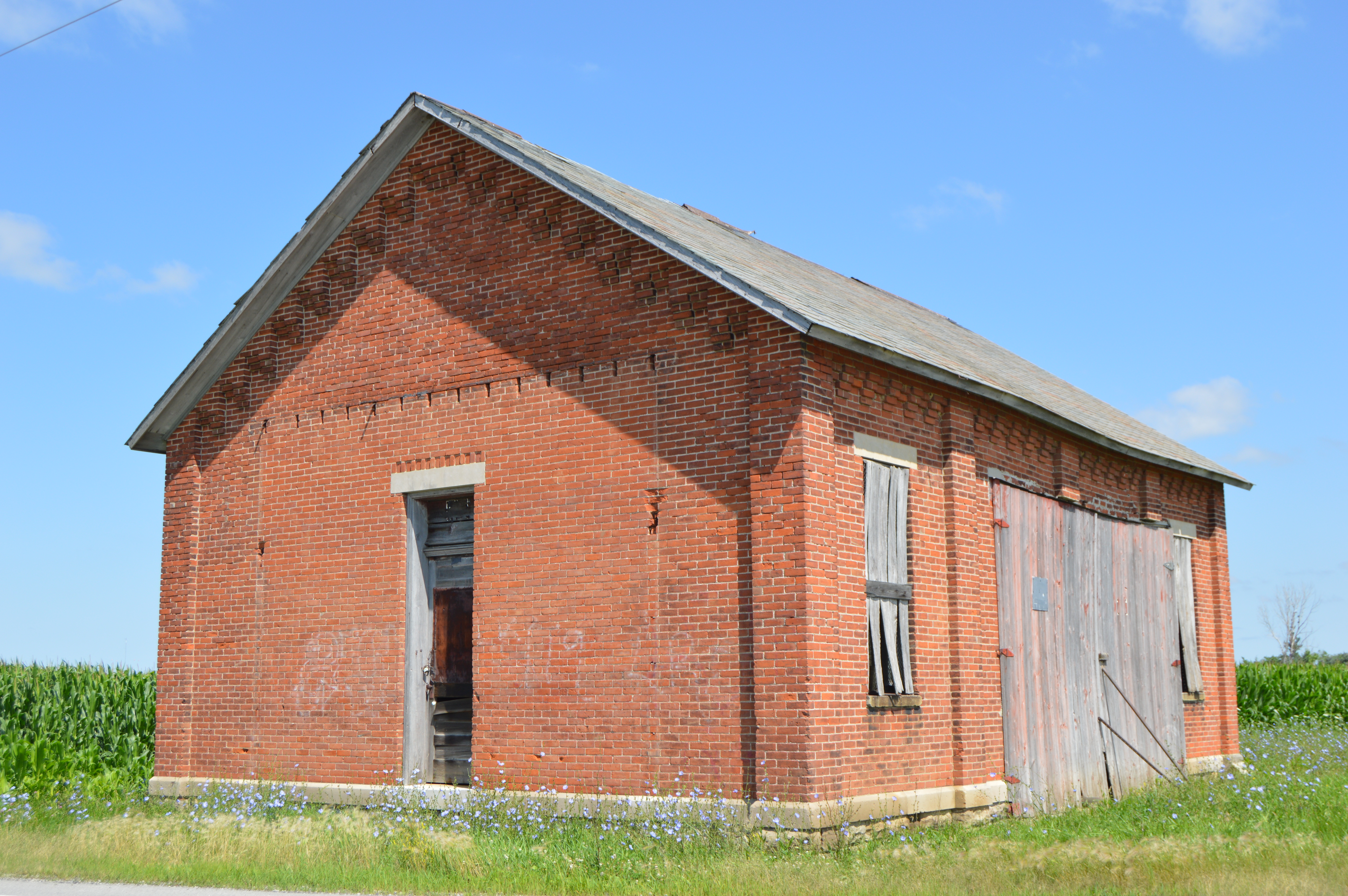
- Former school on State Route 65 northeast of Leipsic

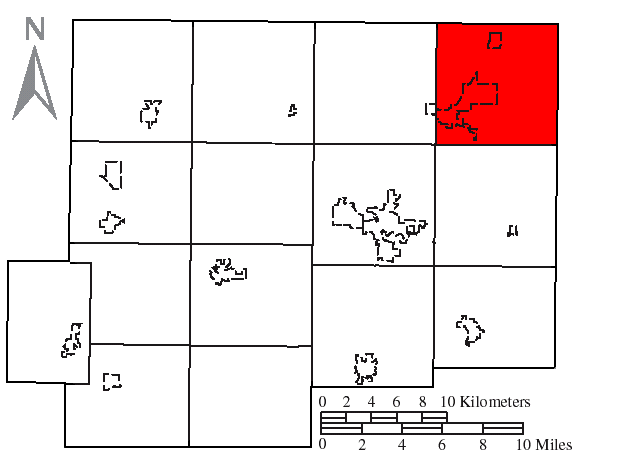
- Location of Van Buren Township in Putnam County
- Coordinates: 41°6′36″N 83°57′39″W
- Country: United States
- State: Ohio
- County: Putnam

Area
  - Total: 36.3 sq mi (93.9 km^{2})
  - Land: 36.2 sq mi (93.8 km^{2})
  - Water: 0.039 sq mi (0.1 km^{2})
- Elevation: 745 ft (227 m)

Population (2020)
  - Total: 2,821
  - Density: 78/sq mi (30.1/km^{2})
- Time zone: UTC-5 (Eastern (EST))
  - Summer (DST): UTC-4 (EDT)
- FIPS code: 39-79450
- GNIS feature ID: 1086871

Van Buren Township is one of the fifteen townships in Putnam County, Ohio, United States. According to the 2020 census, the township had a population of 2,821.

== Geography ==
Located in the northeastern corner of the county, it borders the following townships:

- Bartlow Township, Henry County - north
- Jackson Township, Wood County - northeast corner
- Pleasant Township, Hancock County - east
- Blanchard Township, Hancock County - southeast corner
- Blanchard Township - south
- Ottawa Township - southwest corner
- Liberty Township - west
- Marion Township, Henry County - northwest corner

Two villages are located in Van Buren Township: Belmore in the northern part of the township and Leipsic in the western part of the township.

== Name and history ==
The township was surveyed in 1821, but not organized until 1843. (Before organization it had been known as North Blanchard.) The swampiness of the land and "masses of fallen timbers" were the primary reasons for its slow settlement. Abraham Baughman was the township's first settler, moving there in 1835. The population grew from 172 in 1850 to 608 in 1860 (768 including Leipsic). While most early residents were farmers, over 30 worked as railroad laborers in 1860.

Statewide, other Van Buren Townships are located in Darke, Hancock, and Shelby counties.

== Government ==
The township is governed by a three-member board of trustees, who are elected in November of odd-numbered years to a four-year term beginning on the following January 1. Two are elected in the year after the presidential election and one is elected in the year before it. There is also an elected township fiscal officer, who serves a four-year term beginning on April 1 of the year after the election, which is held in November of the year before the presidential election. Vacancies in the fiscal officership or on the board of trustees are filled by the remaining trustees.
