= Prentiss, Ohio =

Unincorporated community in Ohio, U.S.

Coordinates: 41°09′09″N 84°01′06″W

Prentiss is an unincorporated community in Putnam County, in the U.S. state of Ohio.

== History ==
Prentiss had its start as a station on the railroad. A post office called Prentiss was established in 1896, and remained in operation until 1902.
