= Avis, Ohio =

Unincorporated community in Ohio, U.S.

Coordinates: 41°01′15″N 84°10′09″W

Avis is an unincorporated community in Putnam County, in the U.S. state of Ohio.

Avis was once a station on the railroad but the site was not officially platted. A former variant name of Avis was Bushong. A post office called Bushong was established in 1891, and remained in operation until 1903. Little remains of the original community.Ohio. Two houses. Once owned by Hubert Bernard and Adelia Rechtine Buddelmeyer. Adelia Buddelmeyer ran a general store in Avis for over 40 years.
