= Rice, Ohio =

Unincorporated community in Ohio, U.S.

Coordinates: 41°09′03″N 84°17′40″W

Rice is an unincorporated community in Putnam County, in the U.S. state of Ohio.

== History ==
Rice was originally centered on a country post office. A post office was established at Rice in 1876, and remained in operation until 1904.
