= Jones City, Ohio =

Unincorporated community in Ohio, U.S.

Coordinates: 40°52′53″N 84°10′54″W

Jones City is an unincorporated community in Putnam County, in the U.S. state of Ohio.

== History ==
Jones City was platted in 1890. The community was named after Evan H. Jones, a first settler. Little remains of the original community.
