= Crosswell, Ohio =

Unincorporated community in Ohio, U.S.

Coordinates: 41°1′15″N 84°11′53″W

Crosswell is an unincorporated community in Putnam County, in the U.S. state of Ohio.

Croswell was not officially platted but served the area as a stop on the railroad. Little remains of the original community.
