= Ottoville, Ohio =

Village in Putnam County, Ohio, US

- Village
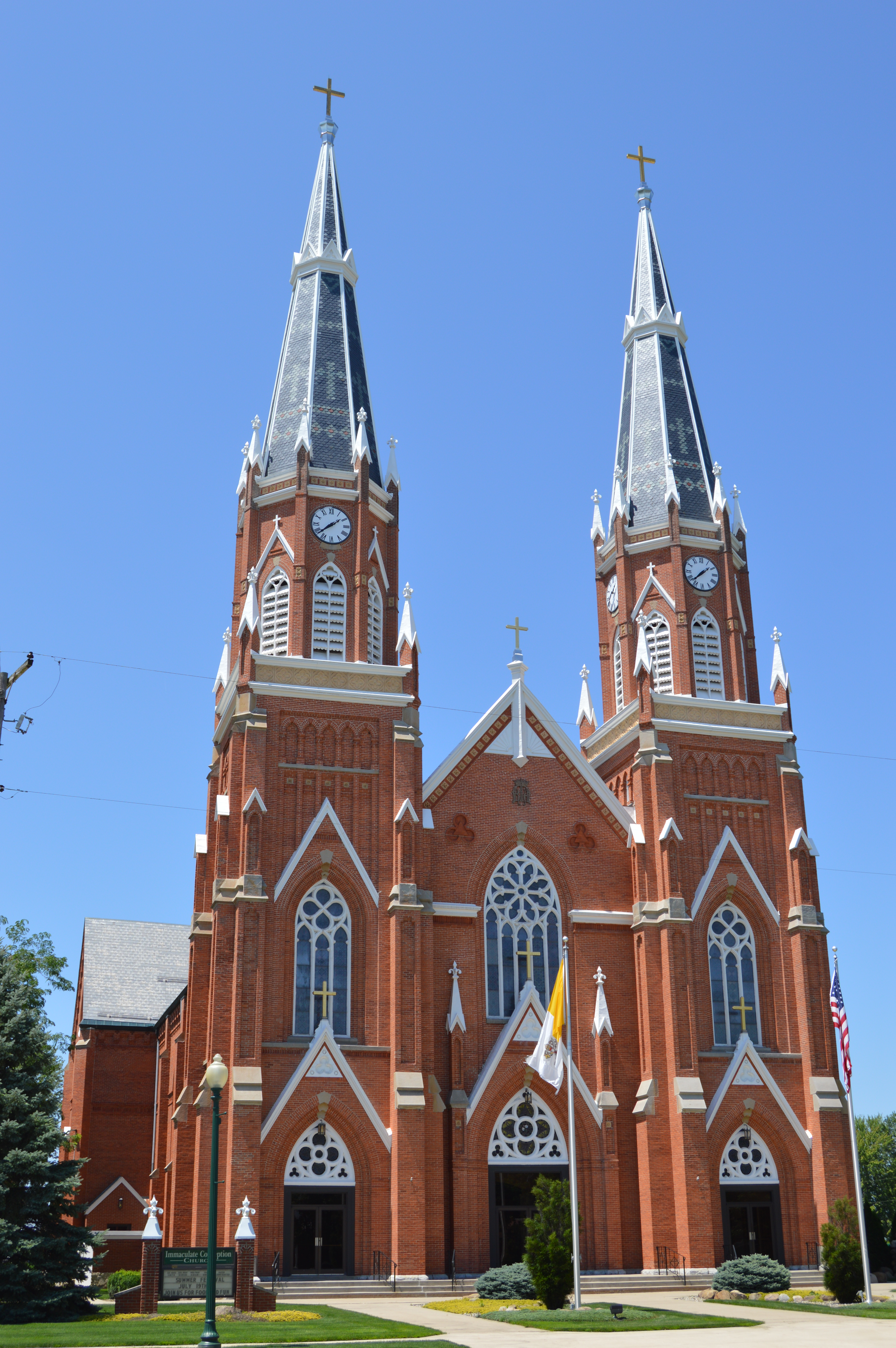
- Immaculate Conception Catholic Church

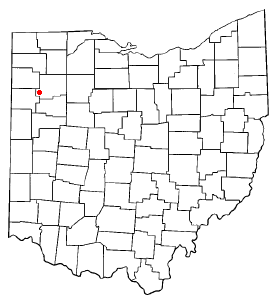
- Location of Ottoville, Ohio

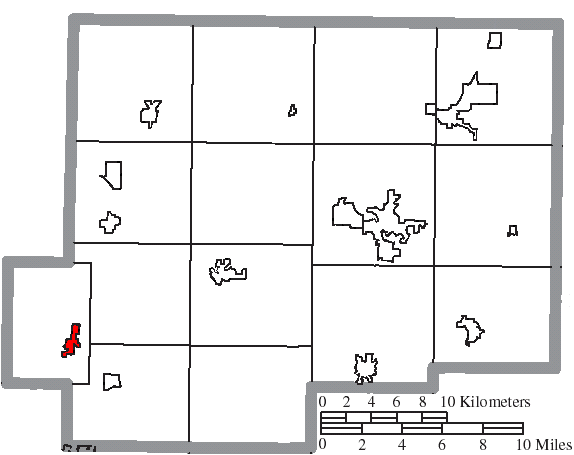
- Location of Ottoville in Putnam County
- Coordinates: 40°56′03″N 84°20′18″W
- Country: United States
- State: Ohio
- County: Putnam

Government
  - Mayor: Ronald A. Miller

Area
  - Total: 0.95 sq mi (2.46 km^{2})
  - Land: 0.95 sq mi (2.45 km^{2})
  - Water: 0 sq mi (0.00 km^{2})
- Elevation: 742 ft (226 m)

Population (2020)
  - Total: 966
  - Density: 1,020.4/sq mi (393.98/km^{2})
- Time zone: UTC-5 (Eastern (EST))
  - Summer (DST): UTC-4 (EDT)
- ZIP code: 45877
- Area code: 419
- FIPS code: 39-59052
- GNIS feature ID: 2399598
- Website: https://www.villageofottoville.org/

Ottoville is a village in Monterey Township, Putnam County, Ohio, United States. The population was 966 at the 2020 census.

== History ==
The first plat at Ottoville was made in 1845 for John Otto Bredeich. The effort at first proved unsuccessful, and the town site was platted again in 1873. A post office called Otto was established in 1880, and the name was changed to Ottoville in 1881. Ottoville was incorporated as a village in 1890.

Historical population
Census	Pop.	Note	%±
1900	369		—
1910	477		29.3%
1920	435		−8.8%
1930	443		1.8%
1940	467		5.4%
1950	543		16.3%
1960	793		46.0%
1970	914		15.3%
1980	833		−8.9%
1990	842		1.1%
2000	873		3.7%
2010	976		11.8%
2020	966		−1.0%
U.S. Decennial Census

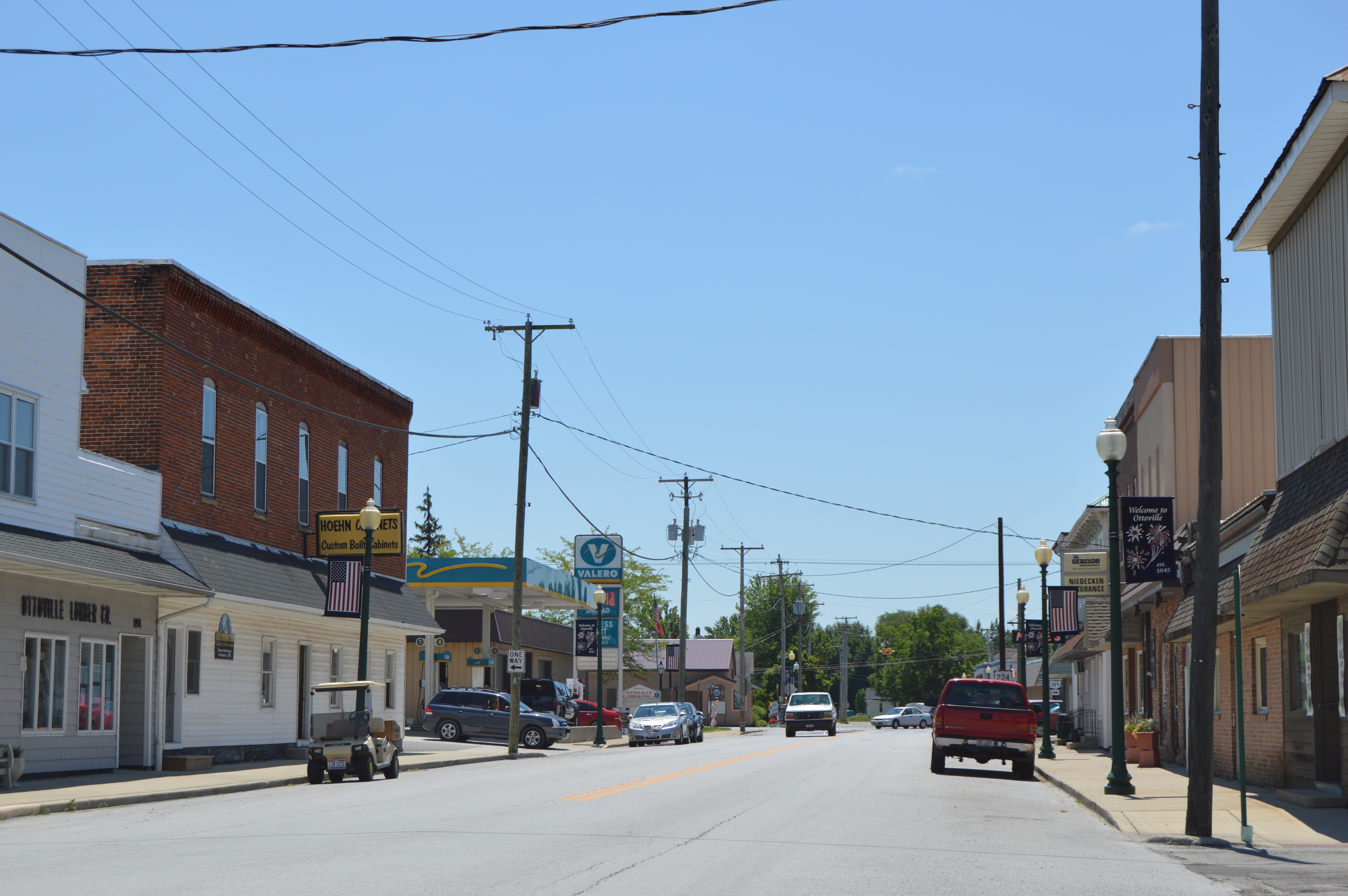
Historic Downtown Ottoville

== Geography ==
According to the United States Census Bureau, the village has a total area of 0.81 square miles (2.10 km^{2}), of which 0.80 square miles (2.07 km^{2}) is land and 0.01 square miles (0.03 km^{2}) is water.

== Demographics ==
=== 2010 census ===
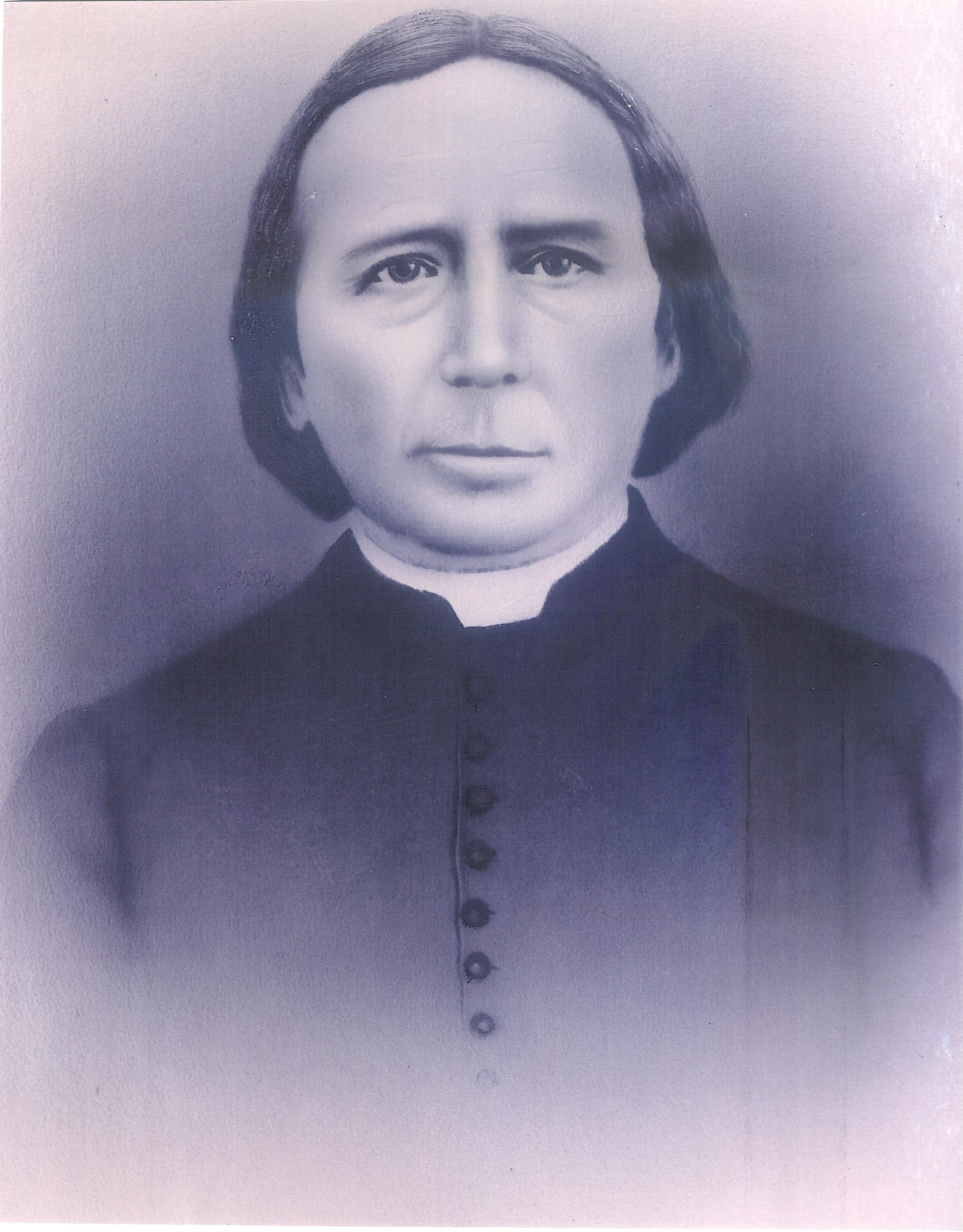
John Otto Bredeich, founded Ottoville

As of the census of 2010, there were 976 people, 392 households, and 279 families living in the village. The population density was 1,220.0 inhabitants per square mile (471.0/km^{2}). There were 411 housing units at an average density of 513.8 per square mile (198.4/km^{2}). The racial makeup of the village was 97.5% White, 0.6% African American, 0.6% Asian, 0.9% from other races, and 0.3% from two or more races. Hispanic or Latino of any race were 1.7% of the population.

There were 392 households, of which 33.7% had children under the age of 18 living with them, 60.7% were married couples living together, 6.9% had a female householder with no husband present, 3.6% had a male householder with no wife present, and 28.8% were non-families. 24.5% of all households were made up of individuals, and 10.2% had someone living alone who was 65 years of age or older. The average household size was 2.49 and the average family size was 2.99.

The median age in the village was 38.7 years. 25.3% of residents were under the age of 18; 8.3% were between the ages of 18 and 24; 22.8% were from 25 to 44; 27.3% were from 45 to 64; and 16.2% were 65 years of age or older. The gender makeup of the village was 48.4% male and 51.6% female.

=== 2000 census ===
As of the census of 2000, there were 873 people, 348 households, and 244 families living in the village. The population density was 1,252.2 inhabitants per square mile (483.5/km^{2}). There were 360 housing units at an average density of 516.4 per square mile (199.4/km^{2}). The racial makeup of the village was 99.08% White, 0.34% Asian, 0.11% from other races, and 0.46% from two or more races. Hispanic or Latino of any race were 0.46% of the population.

There were 348 households, out of which 33.6% had children under the age of 18 living with them, 60.6% were married couples living together, 6.6% had a female householder with no husband present, and 29.6% were non-families. 28.2% of all households were made up of individuals, and 14.4% had someone living alone who was 65 years of age or older. The average household size was 2.51 and the average family size was 3.09.

In the village, the population was spread out, with 28.4% under the age of 18, 6.6% from 18 to 24, 29.6% from 25 to 44, 19.7% from 45 to 64, and 15.7% who were 65 years of age or older. The median age was 37 years. For every 100 females there were 91.0 males. For every 100 females age 18 and over, there were 90.5 males.

The median income for a household in the village was $44,875, and the median income for a family was $55,104. Males had a median income of $37,589 versus $21,944 for females. The per capita income for the village was $19,909. About 2.5% of families and 2.1% of the population were below the poverty line, including 1.6% of those under age 18 and 7.1% of those age 65 or over.

== Education ==
Ottoville Local School District operates one elementary school and Ottoville High School.

Ottoville has a public library, a branch of the Putnam County District Library.
