= Hector, Ohio =

Unincorporated community in Ohio, U.S.

Coordinates: 41°06′01″N 84°13′40″W

Hector is an unincorporated community in Putnam County, in the U.S. state of Ohio.

== History ==
Hector was platted in 1882, and named after Hector Havemeyer, proprietor. A post office was established in 1883, and remained in operation until it was discontinued in 1900. Hector contained a stave factory, but the town's prospects ended once the surrounding forests (and wood supply) were depleted.
