= Blanchard Township, Putnam County, Ohio =

Township in Ohio, US

- Township
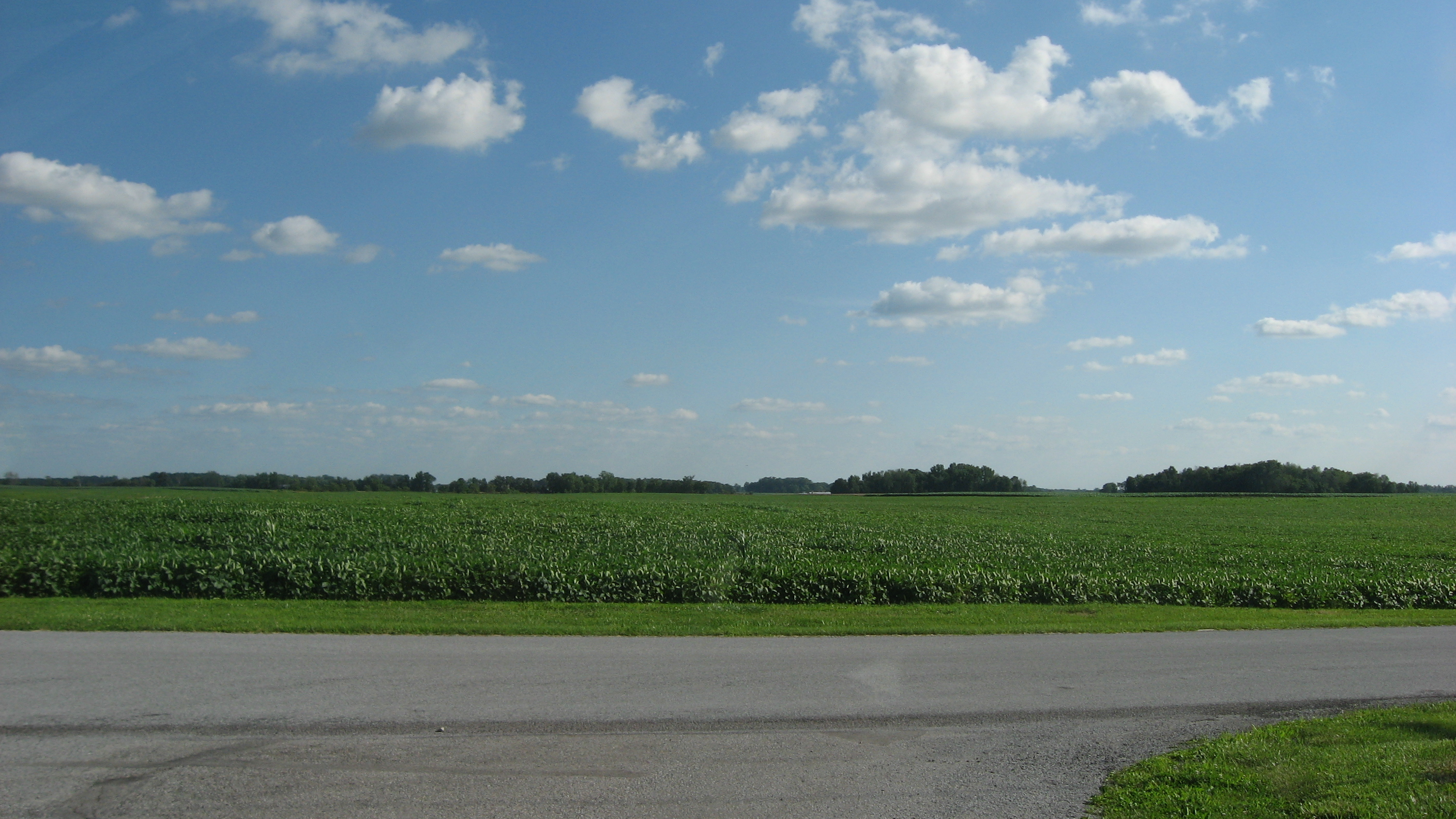
- Fields in central Blanchard Township

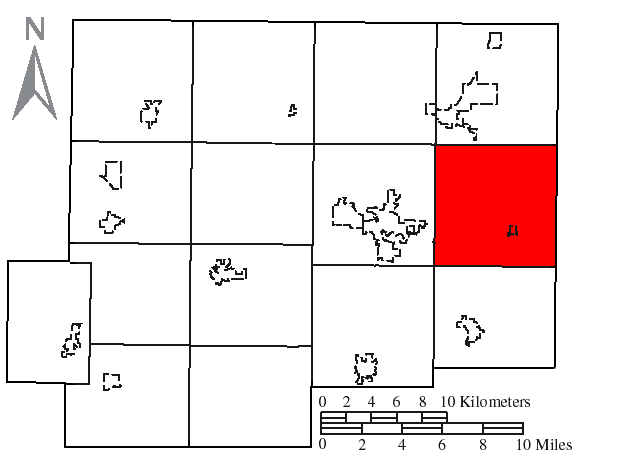
- Location of Blanchard Township in Putnam County
- Coordinates: 41°1′43″N 83°56′4″W
- Country: United States
- State: Ohio
- County: Putnam

Area
  - Total: 36.2 sq mi (93.8 km^{2})
  - Land: 36.2 sq mi (93.8 km^{2})
  - Water: 0 sq mi (0.0 km^{2})
- Elevation: 761 ft (232 m)

Population (2020)
  - Total: 1,224
  - Density: 33.8/sq mi (13.0/km^{2})
- Time zone: UTC-5 (Eastern (EST))
  - Summer (DST): UTC-4 (EDT)
- Zip Code: 45875 45856 45877 45868
- Area code: 419
- FIPS code: 39-06880
- GNIS feature ID: 1086857

Blanchard Township is one of the fifteen townships of Putnam County, Ohio, United States. The 2020 census found 1,224 people in the township.

== Geography ==
Located in the eastern part of the county, it borders the following townships:

- Van Buren Township - north
- Pleasant Township, Hancock County - northeast corner
- Blanchard Township, Hancock County - east
- Union Township, Hancock County - southeast corner
- Riley Township - south
- Pleasant Township - southwest corner
- Ottawa Township - west
- Liberty Township - northwest corner

The village of Gilboa is located in southeastern Blanchard Township.

== Name and history ==
Blanchard Township was established in 1833. This township took its name from the Blanchard River. Statewide, other Blanchard Townships are located in Hancock and Hardin counties.

== Government ==
The township is governed by a three-member board of trustees, who are elected in November of odd-numbered years to a four-year term beginning on the following January 1. Two are elected in the year after the presidential election and one is elected in the year before it. There is also an elected township fiscal officer, who serves a four-year term beginning on April 1 of the year after the election, which is held in November of the year before the presidential election. Vacancies in the fiscal officership or on the board of trustees are filled by the remaining trustees.
