= Harburg =

Harburg may refer to:

== Places in Germany ==
- Harburg (district), Lower Saxony
- Harburg, Bavaria
- Harburg, Hamburg, a borough of Hamburg
  - Harburg (quarter), the former Hanoveran city of Harburg upon Elbe, now a quarter of Hamburg
- Harburg-Wilhelmsburg, a Hanoveran city (1927–1937), now two quarters of Hamburg

== Other uses ==
- Harburg (electoral district), Lower Saxony, Germany
- Harburg Castle, Bavaria, Germany
- Yip Harburg (1896–1981), American lyricist
