= West Leipsic, Ohio =

- Village
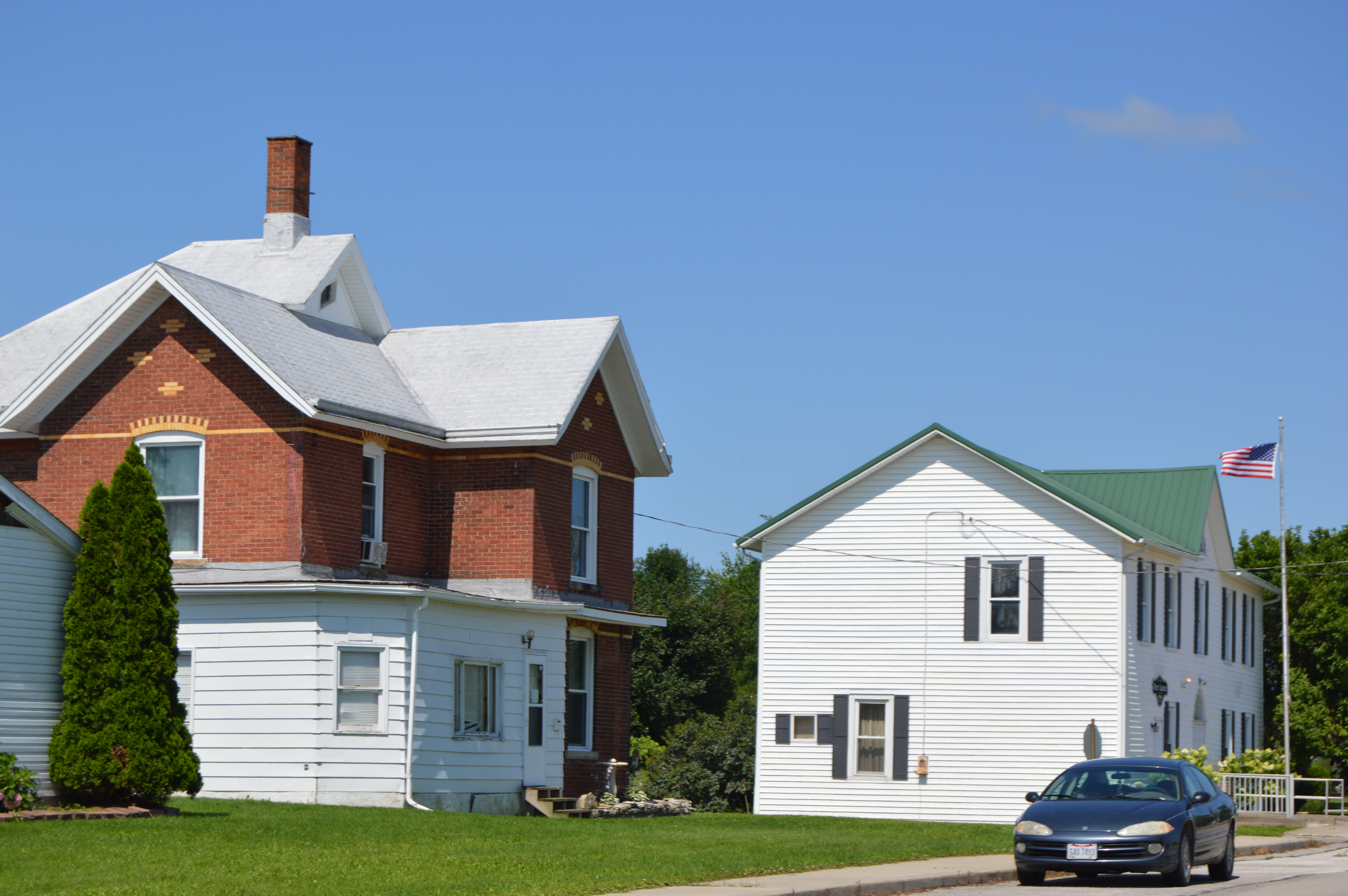
- Main Street; building at right is the village hall.

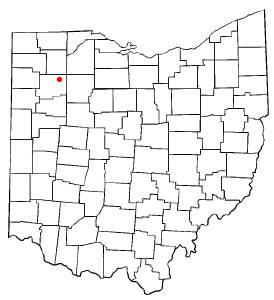
- Location of West Leipsic, Ohio

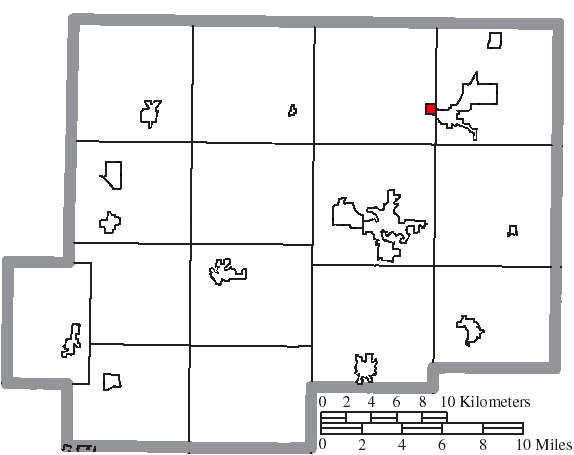
- Location of West Leipsic in Putnam County
- Coordinates: 41°06′19″N 83°59′58″W
- Country: United States
- State: Ohio
- County: Putnam

Area
  - Total: 0.25 sq mi (0.65 km^{2})
  - Land: 0.25 sq mi (0.65 km^{2})
  - Water: 0 sq mi (0.00 km^{2})
- Elevation: 764 ft (233 m)

Population (2020)
  - Total: 226
  - Density: 907.1/sq mi (350.22/km^{2})
- Time zone: UTC-5 (Eastern (EST))
  - Summer (DST): UTC-4 (EDT)
- ZIP code: 45856
- Area code: 419
- FIPS code: 39-83706
- GNIS feature ID: 2400134

West Leipsic is a village in Putnam County, Ohio, United States. The population was 226 at the 2020 census.

== History ==
When platted in 1852, West Leipsic was called "Leipsic"; the adjacent village today known as Leipsic bore the name of "Roanoke". West Leipsic was incorporated as a village in 1882.

== Geography ==
According to the United States Census Bureau, the village has a total area of 0.24 square miles (0.62 km^{2}), all land.

== Demographics ==
Historical population
Census	Pop.	Note	%±
1890	502		—
1900	346		−31.1%
1910	253		−26.9%
1920	271		7.1%
1930	289		6.6%
1940	326		12.8%
1950	304		−6.7%
1960	320		5.3%
1970	378		18.1%
1980	298		−21.2%
1990	244		−18.1%
2000	271		11.1%
2010	206		−24.0%
2020	226		9.7%
U.S. Decennial Census

=== 2010 census ===
As of the census of 2010, there were 206 people, 82 households, and 55 families living in the village. The population density was 858.3 inhabitants per square mile (331.4/km^{2}). There were 93 housing units at an average density of 387.5 per square mile (149.6/km^{2}). The racial makeup of the village was 83.0% White, 0.5% African American, 1.5% Asian, 13.6% from other races, and 1.5% from two or more races. Hispanic or Latino of any race were 29.6% of the population.

There were 82 households, of which 30.5% had children under the age of 18 living with them, 54.9% were married couples living together, 7.3% had a female householder with no husband present, 4.9% had a male householder with no wife present, and 32.9% were non-families. 26.8% of all households were made up of individuals, and 12.2% had someone living alone who was 65 years of age or older. The average household size was 2.51 and the average family size was 3.13.

The median age in the village was 40.4 years. 24.3% of residents were under the age of 18; 8.3% were between the ages of 18 and 24; 24.7% were from 25 to 44; 23.4% were from 45 to 64; and 19.4% were 65 years of age or older. The gender makeup of the village was 48.1% male and 51.9% female.

=== 2000 census ===
As of the census of 2000, there were 271 people, 97 households, and 67 families living in the village. The population density was 1,135.7 inhabitants per square mile (438.5/km^{2}). There were 104 housing units at an average density of 435.8 per square mile (168.3/km^{2}). The racial makeup of the village was 71.96% White, 1.11% Native American, 22.88% from other races, and 4.06% from two or more races. Hispanic or Latino of any race were 32.47% of the population.

There were 97 households, out of which 33.0% had children under the age of 18 living with them, 49.5% were married couples living together, 9.3% had a female householder with no husband present, and 29.9% were non-families. 26.8% of all households were made up of individuals, and 16.5% had someone living alone who was 65 years of age or older. The average household size was 2.79 and the average family size was 3.43.

In the village, the population was spread out, with 31.0% under the age of 18, 10.7% from 18 to 24, 26.9% from 25 to 44, 17.0% from 45 to 64, and 14.4% who were 65 years of age or older. The median age was 33 years. For every 100 females there were 124.0 males. For every 100 females age 18 and over, there were 117.4 males.

The median income for a household in the village was $38,333, and the median income for a family was $50,625. Males had a median income of $30,375 versus $20,313 for females. The per capita income for the village was $19,349. About 5.6% of families and 8.5% of the population were below the poverty line, including 11.1% of those under the age of eighteen and 5.9% of those 65 or over.
