= Jennings Township, Putnam County, Ohio =

Township in Ohio, US

- Township
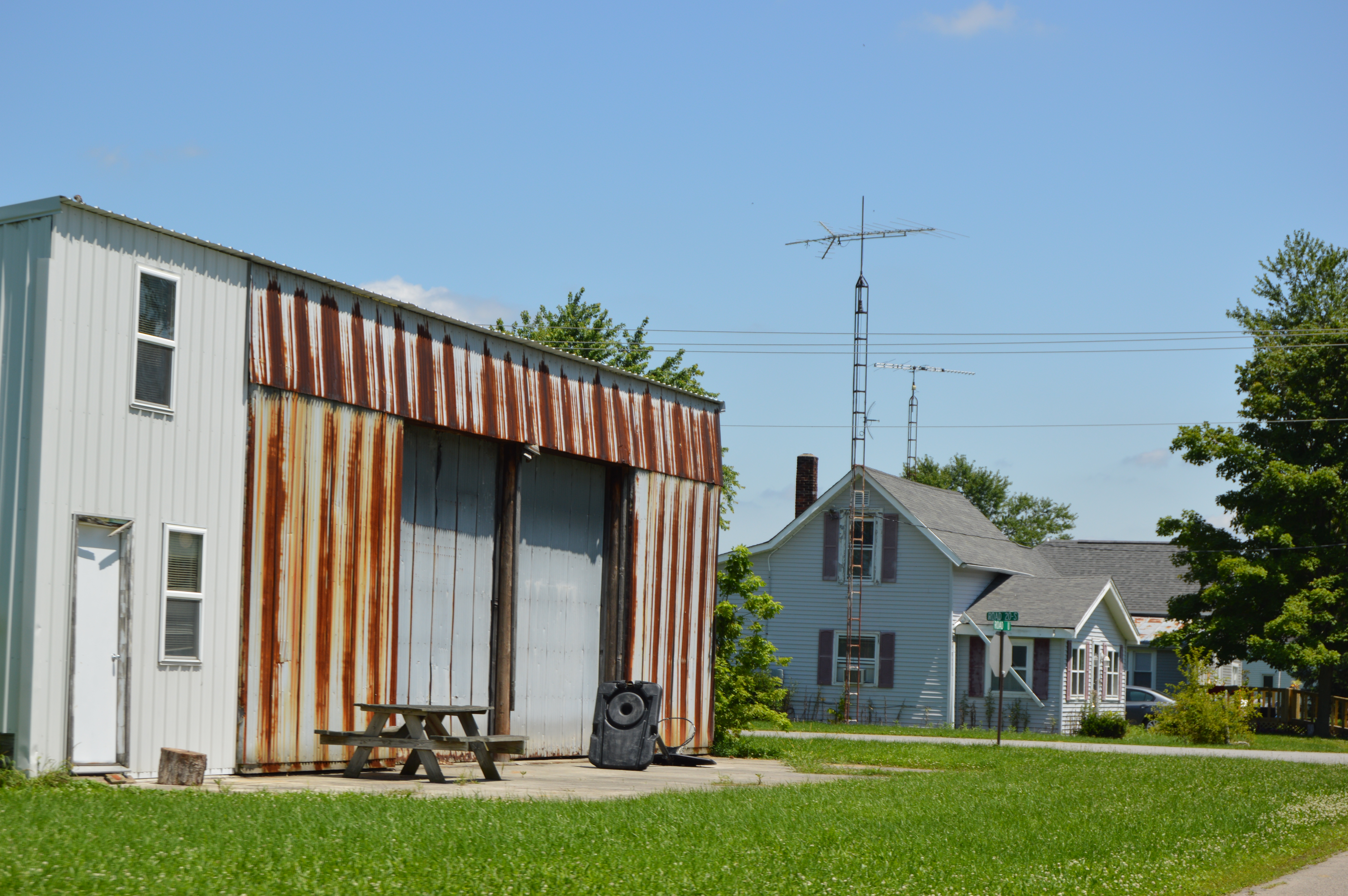
- Road U in Rushmore

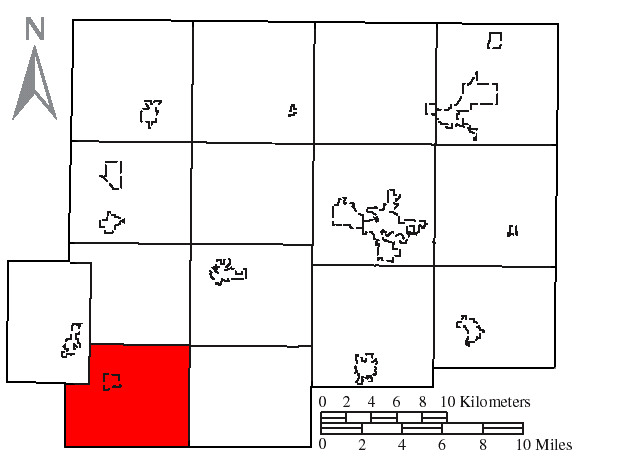
- Location of Jennings Township in Putnam County
- Coordinates: 40°53′21″N 84°17′17″W
- Country: United States
- State: Ohio
- County: Putnam

Area
  - Total: 28.3 sq mi (73.4 km^{2})
  - Land: 28.3 sq mi (73.3 km^{2})
  - Water: 0 sq mi (0.0 km^{2})
- Elevation: 745 ft (227 m)

Population (2020)
  - Total: 2,002
  - Density: 70.7/sq mi (27.3/km^{2})
- Time zone: UTC-5 (Eastern (EST))
  - Summer (DST): UTC-4 (EDT)
- FIPS code: 39-38976
- GNIS feature ID: 1086860

Jennings Township is one of the fifteen townships of Putnam County, Ohio, United States. The 2020 census found 2,002 people in the township.

== Geography ==
Located in the southwestern corner of the county, it borders the following townships:

- Jackson Township – north
- Union Township – northeast corner
- Sugar Creek Township – east
- Sugar Creek Township, Allen County – southeast corner
- Marion Township, Allen County – south
- Washington Township, Van Wert County – southwest
- Monterey Township – northwest

The village of Fort Jennings is located in northwestern Jennings Township.

== Name and history ==
Jennings Township was organized in the 1830s, but the exact date is uncertain since records were destroyed. Statewide, the only other Jennings Township is located in Van Wert County.

== Government ==
The township is governed by a three-member board of trustees, who are elected in November of odd-numbered years to a four-year term beginning on the following January 1. Two are elected in the year after the presidential election and one is elected in the year before it. There is also an elected township fiscal officer, who serves a four-year term beginning on April 1 of the year after the election, which is held in November of the year before the presidential election. Vacancies in the fiscal officership or on the board of trustees are filled by the remaining trustees.
