= Hartsburg, Ohio =

Unincorporated community in Ohio, U.S.

Coordinates: 41°05′33″N 84°19′28″W

Hartsburg is an unincorporated community in Putnam County, in the U.S. state of Ohio.

== History ==
Hartsburg was not officially platted but was a stop on the Nickel Plate Railroad. The Hartsburg post office closed in 1904.
