= Herzburg =

Castle located in Germany

Coordinates: 50°40′32″N 7°42′07″E

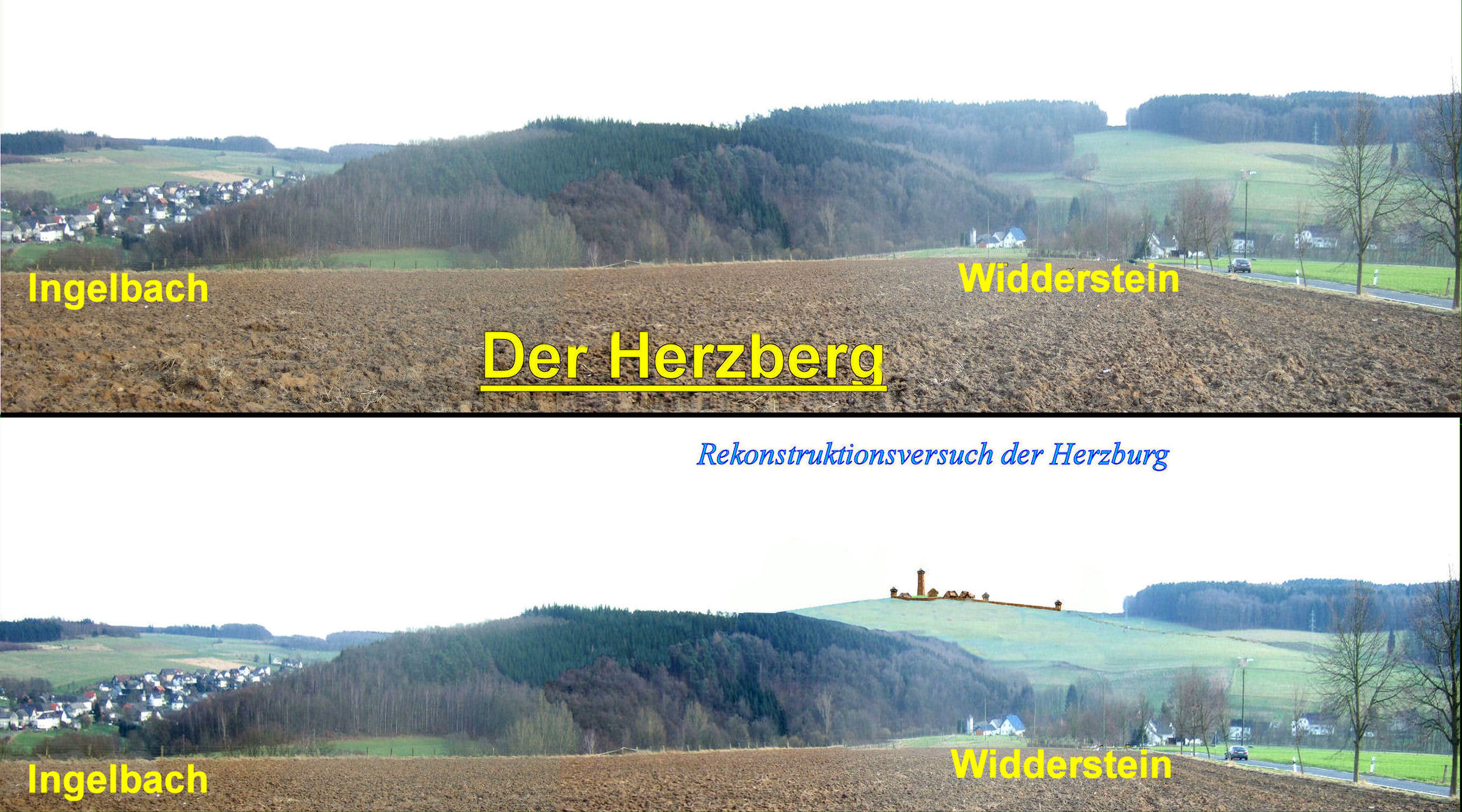
Herzburg reconstruction

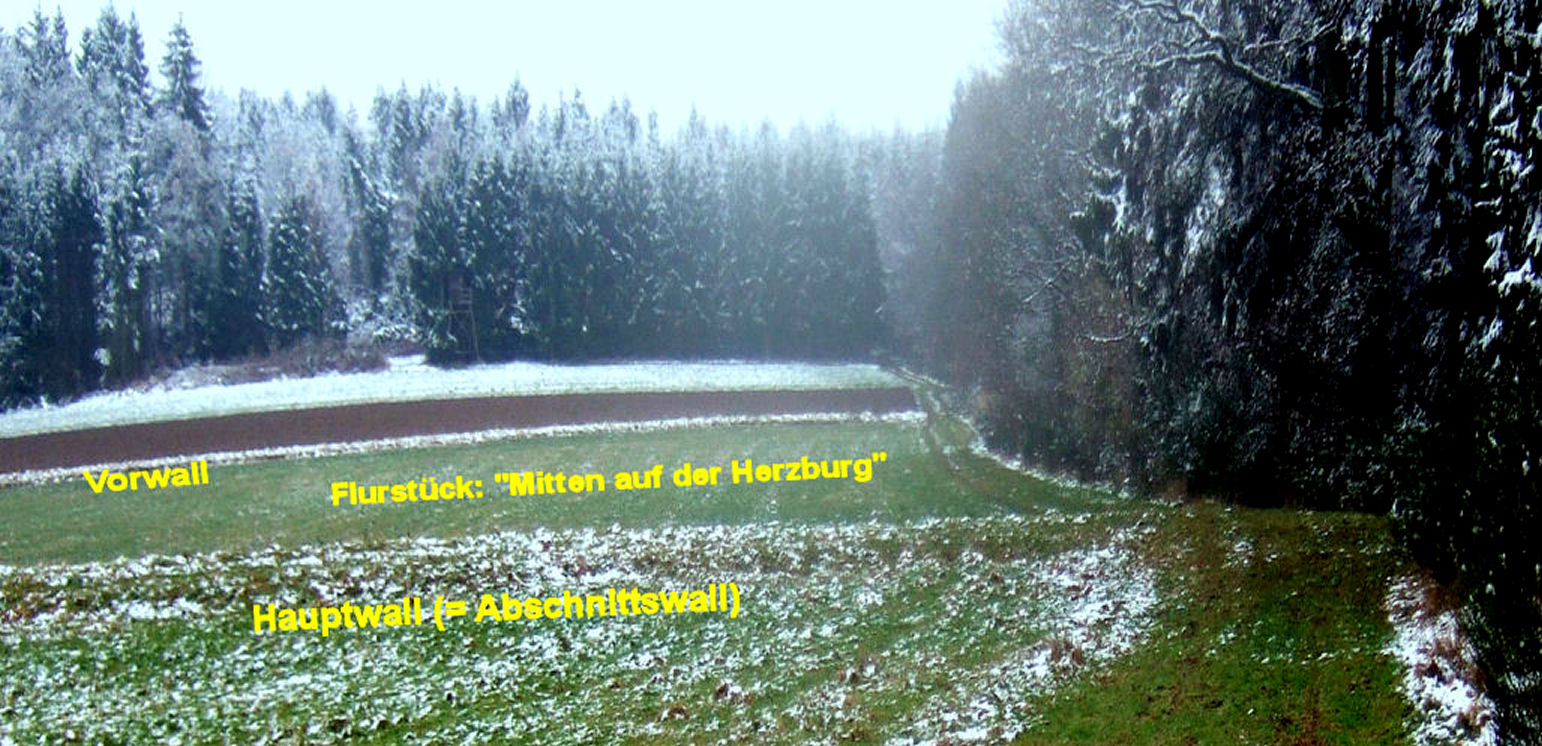
Section of rampart at Herzburg

The Herzburg (also sometimes the Harzburg) was a castle near the county town of Altenkirchen (Westerwald) that stood on the long hill spur between Gieleroth, Widderstein, Ingelbach and Borod. Archaeological monuments and place names give clues to the earlier settlement. The River Wied flows around this hilltop which is strategically located between the old "Cologne-Frankfurt Road" (now the B 8) and the old Cologne-Leipzig road (now the B 414). The two routes are combined from Cologne to Altenkirchen and then branch out. The Cologne-Leipzig road is also called the Cologne High Military and Escort Road (Cölnische Hohe Heer- und Geleitstraße) from Cologne to Greifenstein/Herborn on the Lahn.

The mineral wealth beneath the Herzberg and the proximity of the two "High Roads" (= watershed roads) suggest that the region was inhabited in prehistoric times. A prehistoric tumulus was not removed until 1935 by the Arbeitsdienst ("labour service"). The rampart section, which was to protect the ridge from enemies, is still clearly visible.

In old maps from 1820 the hill ridge of Harzburg is mentioned. But the new cadastral map refers to it as Herzberg, Herzburg and Erzburg. Several springs rise on its slopes, so that shafts on the hilltop do not have to be driven too deeply to create wells.

In the Middle Ages a castle fortification was probably established on the Herzberg to guard the two highways. When, in 1300, in nearby Altenkirchen - already an important road hub - a castle was built and, in 1314, the town was fortified, the Herzburg lost its significance. Of the Herzburg all that remained was a Burgmann's farm which was outside the site on a plot of land known as Mitten auf der Herzburg ("Centre of the Herzburg"). This probably disappeared with the demise of the County of Sayn-Altenkirchen.

In the surrounding villages, a legend is still told about the Herzburg.

== Sources ==
- Die Herzburg and Die Sage von der Herzburg in: Günter Fleischer/Mathilde Osterrath u.a., Gieleroth-Herpteroth-Amteroth 1408-2008 Heimat im Wandel, Gieleroth 2008, p. 61-71 with other sources. - Also viewable on the Internet: Gielerother Chronik (pdf: 16 MB)
