= Rushmore, Ohio =

Unincorporated community in Ohio, US

Coordinates: 40°52′27″N 84°15′12″W

Rushmore is an unincorporated community in Putnam County, in the U.S. state of Ohio.

== History ==
A post office called Rushmore was established in 1882, and remained in operation until 1955. The community once had its own schoolhouse.
