= Monterey Township, Putnam County, Ohio =

Township in Ohio, US

- Township
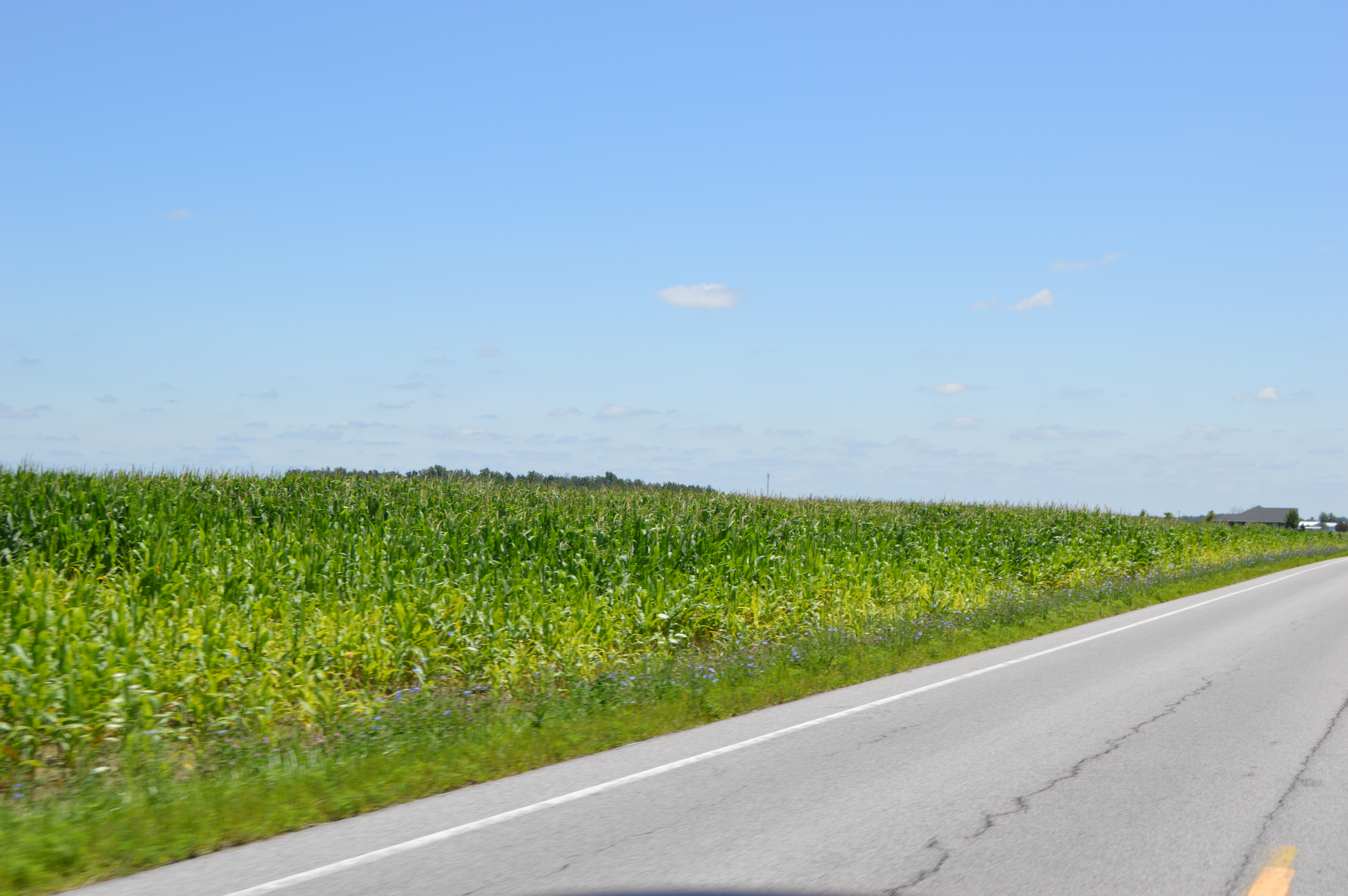
- Cornfield southeast of Ottoville

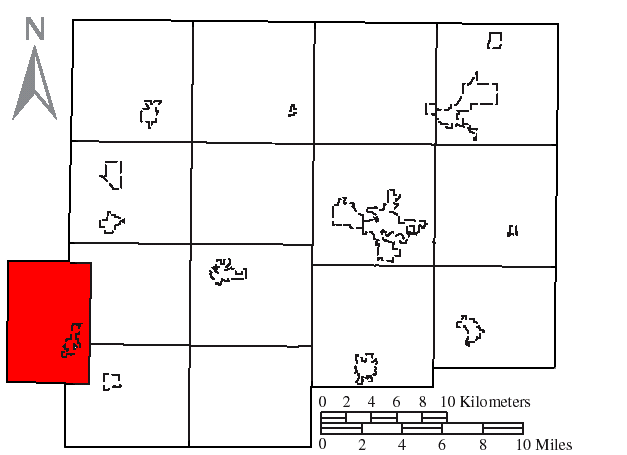
- Location of Monterey Township in Putnam County
- Coordinates: 40°56′23″N 84°20′59″W
- Country: United States
- State: Ohio
- County: Putnam

Area
  - Total: 24.6 sq mi (63.8 km^{2})
  - Land: 24.6 sq mi (63.8 km^{2})
  - Water: 0 sq mi (0.0 km^{2})
- Elevation: 738 ft (225 m)

Population (2020)
  - Total: 2,029
  - Density: 82.4/sq mi (31.8/km^{2})
- Time zone: UTC-5 (Eastern (EST))
  - Summer (DST): UTC-4 (EDT)
- FIPS code: 39-51660
- GNIS feature ID: 1086863

Monterey Township is one of the fifteen townships of Putnam County, Ohio, United States. The 2020 census found 2,029 people in the township.

== Geography ==
Located in the far western part of the county, it borders the following townships:

- Jackson Township – northeast
- Jennings Township – southeast
- Washington Township, Van Wert County – southwest
- Jackson Township, Van Wert County – west
- Washington Township, Paulding County – northwest

The village of Ottoville is located in eastern Monterey Township.

== Name and history ==
Monterey Township was organized in 1849. It is the only Monterey Township statewide.

== Government ==
The township is governed by a three-member board of trustees, who are elected in November of odd-numbered years to a four-year term beginning on the following January 1. Two are elected in the year after the presidential election and one is elected in the year before it. There is also an elected township fiscal officer, who serves a four-year term beginning on April 1 of the year after the election, which is held in November of the year before the presidential election. Vacancies in the fiscal officership or on the board of trustees are filled by the remaining trustees.
