= Liberty Township, Putnam County, Ohio =

Township in Ohio, US

- Township
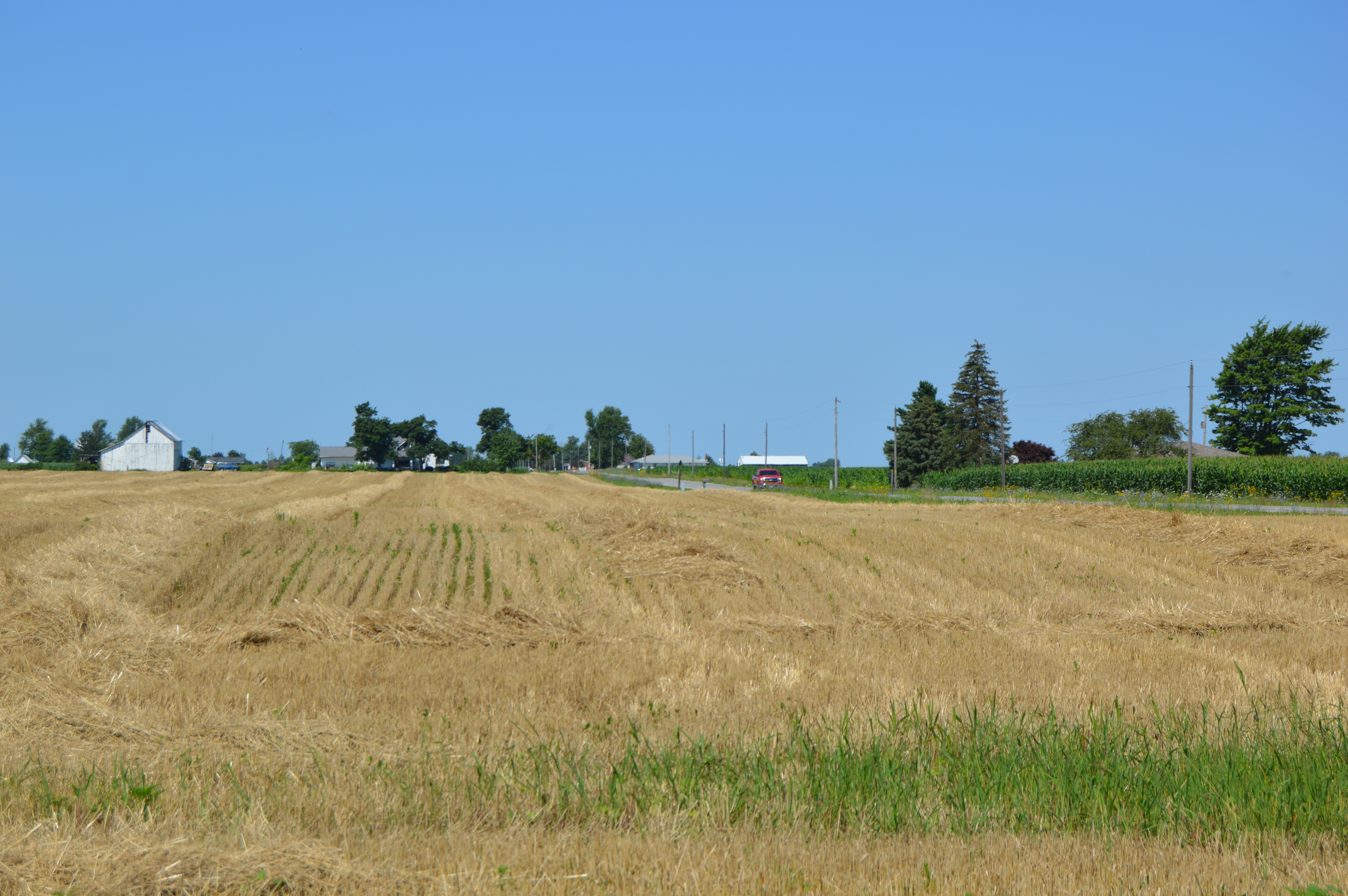
- Stubble field just southwest of West Leipsic

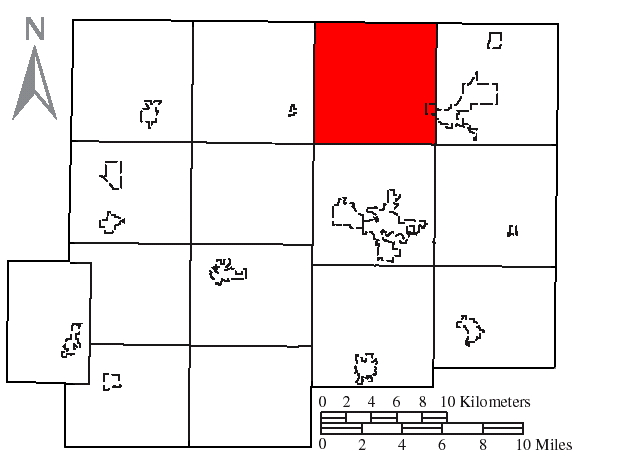
- Location of Liberty Township in Putnam County
- Coordinates: 41°7′3″N 84°2′38″W
- Country: United States
- State: Ohio
- County: Putnam

Area
  - Total: 36.4 sq mi (94.3 km^{2})
  - Land: 36.4 sq mi (94.3 km^{2})
  - Water: 0 sq mi (0.0 km^{2})
- Elevation: 768 ft (234 m)

Population (2020)
  - Total: 1,675
  - Density: 46.0/sq mi (17.8/km^{2})
- Time zone: UTC-5 (Eastern (EST))
  - Summer (DST): UTC-4 (EDT)
- FIPS code: 39-43288
- GNIS feature ID: 1086861

Liberty Township is one of the fifteen townships of Putnam County, Ohio, United States. As of the 2020 census, the township's population was 1,675.

== Geography ==
Located in the northern part of the county, it borders the following townships:

- Marion Township, Henry County - north
- Bartlow Township, Henry County - northeast corner
- Van Buren Township - east
- Blanchard Township - southeast corner
- Ottawa Township - south
- Greensburg Township - southwest corner
- Palmer Township - west
- Pleasant Township, Henry County - northwest corner

The village of West Leipsic is located in far eastern Liberty Township.

== Name and history ==
Liberty Township was established in 1837. It is one of twenty-five Liberty Townships statewide.

== Government ==
The township is governed by a three-member board of trustees, who are elected in November of odd-numbered years to a four-year term beginning on the following January 1. Two are elected in the year after the presidential election and one is elected in the year before it. There is also an elected township fiscal officer, who serves a four-year term beginning on April 1 of the year after the election, which is held in November of the year before the presidential election. Vacancies in the fiscal officership or on the board of trustees are filled by the remaining trustees.
