= Riley Township, Putnam County, Ohio =

Township in Ohio, US

- Township
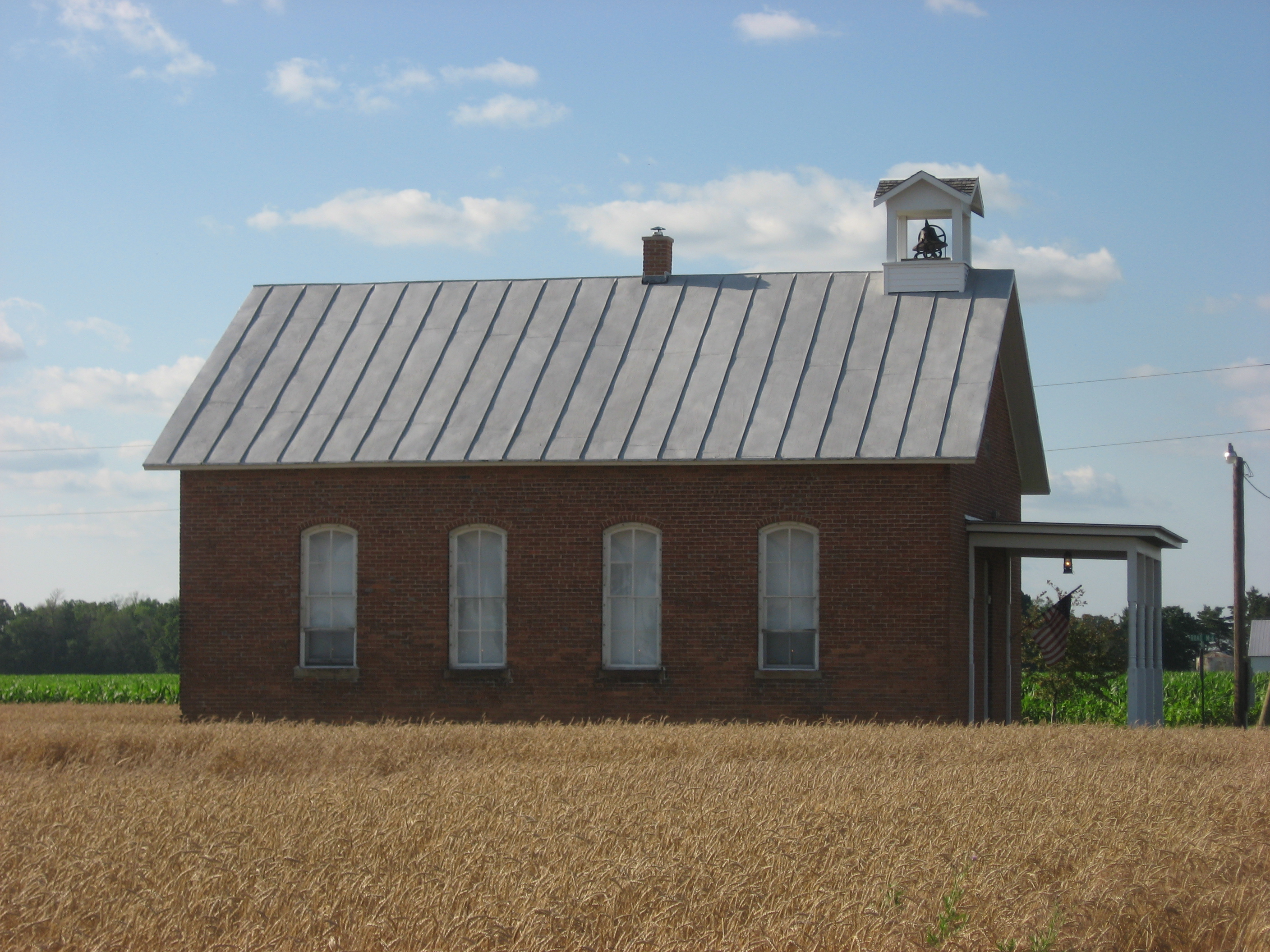
- The Bridenbaugh District No. 3 Schoolhouse at Roads 6 and M-6

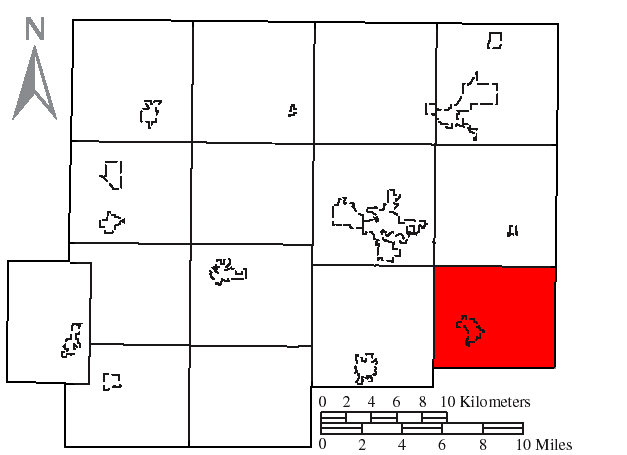
- Location of Riley Township in Putnam County
- Coordinates: 40°57′24″N 83°56′52″W
- Country: United States
- State: Ohio
- County: Putnam

Area
  - Total: 30.2 sq mi (78.3 km^{2})
  - Land: 30.2 sq mi (78.2 km^{2})
  - Water: 0.039 sq mi (0.1 km^{2})
- Elevation: 771 ft (235 m)

Population (2020)
  - Total: 2,242
  - Density: 74/sq mi (28.7/km^{2})
- Time zone: UTC-5 (Eastern (EST))
  - Summer (DST): UTC-4 (EDT)
- FIPS code: 39-67174
- GNIS feature ID: 1086868

Riley Township is one of the fifteen townships of Putnam County, Ohio, United States. The 2020 census found 2,242 people in the township.

== Geography ==
Located in the southeastern corner of the county, it borders the following townships:

- Blanchard Township - north
- Blanchard Township, Hancock County - northeast corner
- Union Township, Hancock County - east
- Richland Township, Allen County - south
- Pleasant Township - west
- Ottawa Township - northwest corner

The village of Pandora is located in central Riley Township.

== Name and history ==
Riley Township was established in 1834. This township took its name from Riley Creek. Statewide, the only other Riley Township is located in Sandusky County.

== Government ==
The township is governed by a three-member board of trustees, who are elected in November of odd-numbered years to a four-year term beginning on the following January 1. Two are elected in the year after the presidential election and one is elected in the year before it. There is also an elected township fiscal officer, who serves a four-year term beginning on April 1 of the year after the election, which is held in November of the year before the presidential election. Vacancies in the fiscal officership or on the board of trustees are filled by the remaining trustees.
