= Jackson Township, Putnam County, Ohio =

Township in Ohio, US

- Township
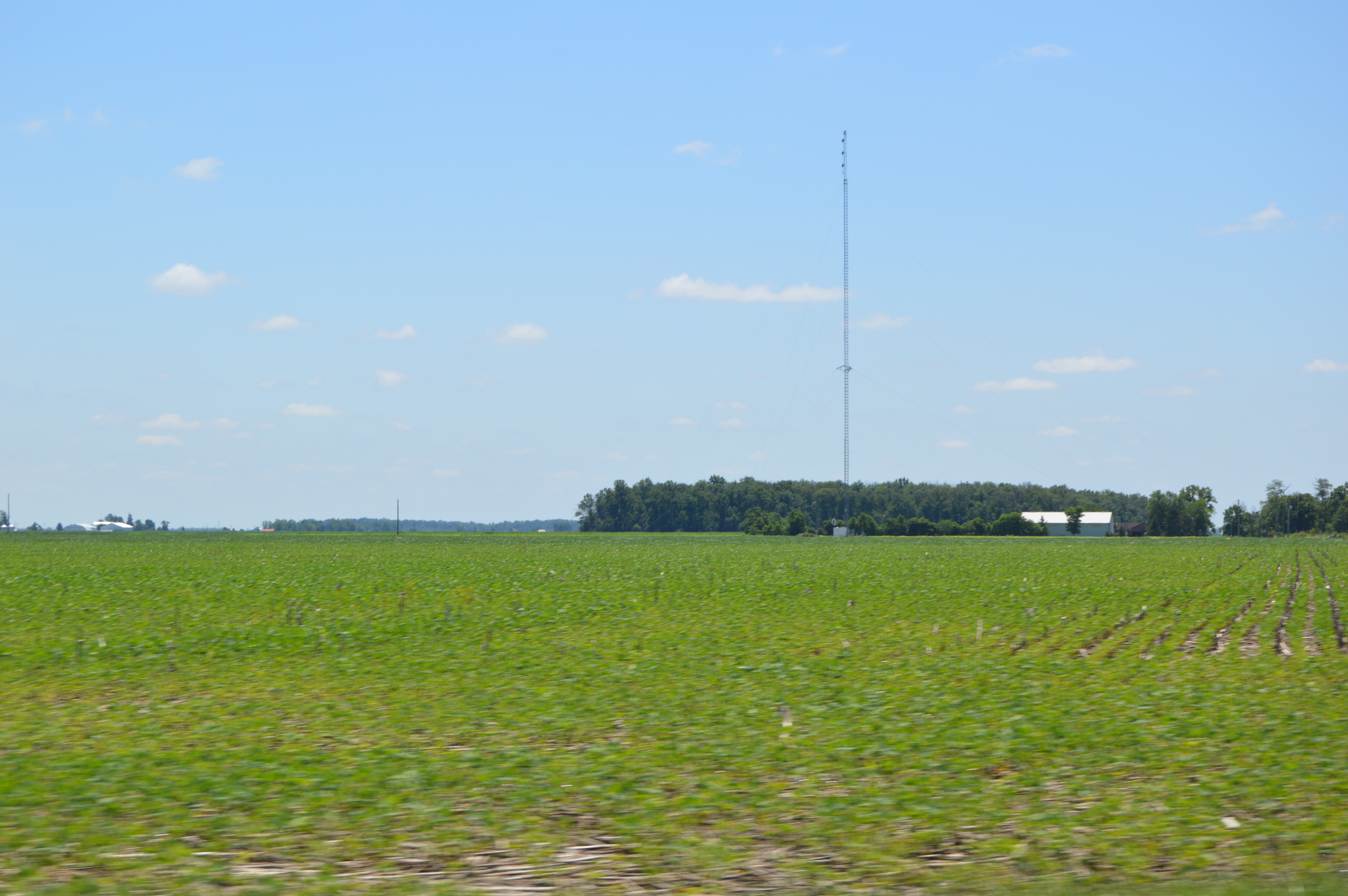
- Scene along U.S. Route 224 southwest of Kalida

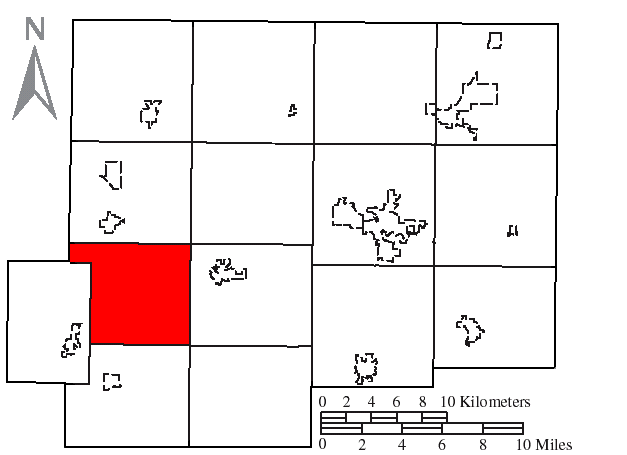
- Location of Jackson Township in Putnam County
- Coordinates: 40°58′15″N 84°15′37″W
- Country: United States
- State: Ohio
- County: Putnam

Area
  - Total: 25.8 sq mi (66.9 km^{2})
  - Land: 25.8 sq mi (66.9 km^{2})
  - Water: 0 sq mi (0.0 km^{2})
- Elevation: 728 ft (222 m)

Population (2020)
  - Total: 885
  - Density: 34.3/sq mi (13.2/km^{2})
- Time zone: UTC-5 (Eastern (EST))
  - Summer (DST): UTC-4 (EDT)
- FIPS code: 39-38024
- GNIS feature ID: 1086859

Jackson Township is one of the fifteen townships of Putnam County, Ohio, United States. The 2020 census found 885 people in the township.

== Geography ==
Located in the western part of the county, it borders the following townships:

- Perry Township - north
- Greensburg Township - northeast corner
- Union Township - east
- Sugar Creek Township - southeast corner
- Jennings Township - south
- Monterey Township - southwest
- Washington Township, Paulding County - northwest

No municipalities are located in Jackson Township.

== Name and history ==
Jackson Township was organized in the 1830s, but the exact date is unknown since records were lost. It is one of thirty-seven Jackson Townships statewide.

== Government ==
The township is governed by a three-member board of trustees, who are elected in November of odd-numbered years to a four-year term beginning on the following January 1. Two are elected in the year after the presidential election and one is elected in the year before it. There is also an elected township fiscal officer, who serves a four-year term beginning on April 1 of the year after the election, which is held in November of the year before the presidential election. Vacancies in the fiscal officership or on the board of trustees are filled by the remaining trustees.
