= Putnam County, Ohio =

County in Ohio, United States

- County
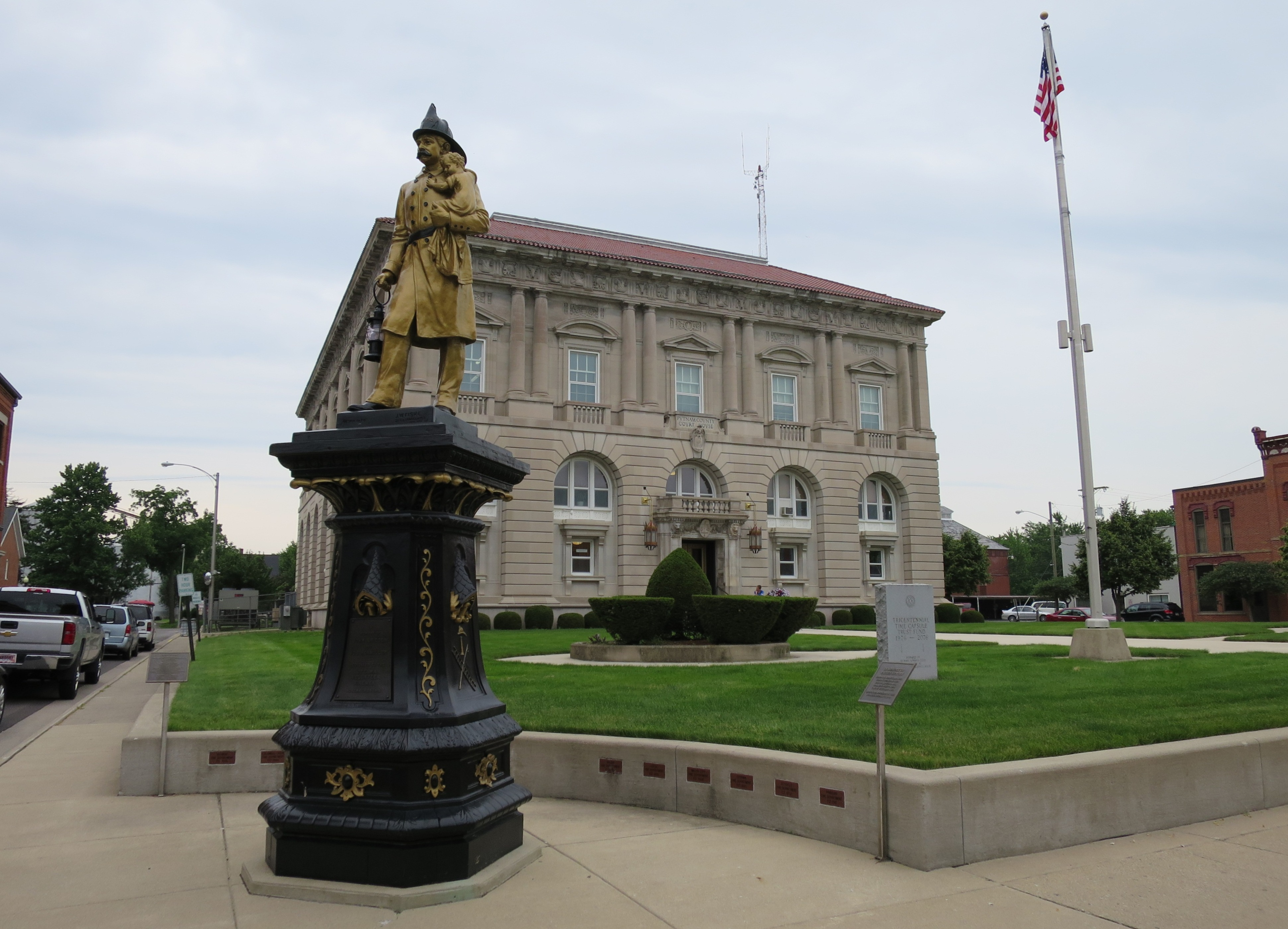
- Putnam County Courthouse

- Flag Seal

- Location within the U.S. state of Ohio
- Coordinates: 41°01′N 84°08′W
- Country: United States
- State: Ohio
- Founded: January 3, 1834
- Named for: Israel Putnam
- Seat: Ottawa
- Largest village: Ottawa

Area
  - Total: 484 sq mi (1,250 km^{2})
  - Land: 483 sq mi (1,250 km^{2})
  - Water: 1.8 sq mi (4.7 km^{2}) 0.4%

Population (2020)
  - Total: 34,451
  - Estimate (2025): 34,380 ▼
  - Density: 71/sq mi (27/km^{2})
- Time zone: UTC−5 (Eastern)
  - Summer (DST): UTC−4 (EDT)
- Congressional district: 5th
- Website: www.putnamcountyohio.gov

Putnam County is a county located in the northwestern part of the U.S. state of Ohio. As of the 2020 United States census, the population was 34,451. Its county seat is Ottawa. The county was created in 1820 and later organized in 1834. Its name is in honor of Israel Putnam, a colonial officer in the French and Indian War, who served as a general in the American Revolutionary War. The Blanchard River, which passes through the county, was a key transportation route for early European-American settlers.

== Geography ==
According to the U.S. Census Bureau, the county has a total area of 484 square miles (1,250 km^{2}), of which 483 square miles (1,250 km^{2}) is land and 1.8 square miles (4.7 km^{2}) (0.4%) is water. The Blanchard River passes through the county.

=== Adjacent counties ===
- Henry County (north)
- Hancock County (east)
- Allen County (south)
- Van Wert County (southwest)
- Paulding County (west)
- Defiance County (northwest)
- Wood County (northeast, at a single point)

== Demographics ==
Historical population
Census	Pop.	Note	%±
1830	230		—
1840	5,189		2,156.1%
1850	7,221		39.2%
1860	12,808		77.4%
1870	17,081		33.4%
1880	23,713		38.8%
1890	30,188		27.3%
1900	32,525		7.7%
1910	29,972		−7.8%
1920	27,751		−7.4%
1930	25,074		−9.6%
1940	25,016		−0.2%
1950	25,248		0.9%
1960	28,331		12.2%
1970	31,134		9.9%
1980	32,991		6.0%
1990	33,819		2.5%
2000	34,726		2.7%
2010	34,499		−0.7%
2020	34,451		−0.1%
2025 (est.)	34,380	▼	−0.2%
U.S. Decennial Census; 1790-1960 1900-1990; 1990-2000 2020

=== Racial and ethnic composition ===
Putnam County, Ohio – Racial and ethnic composition Note: the US Census treats Hispanic/Latino as an ethnic category. This table excludes Latinos from the racial categories and assigns them to a separate category. Hispanics/Latinos may be of any race.
Race / Ethnicity (NH = Non-Hispanic)	Pop 1980	Pop 1990	Pop 2000	Pop 2010	Pop 2020	% 1980	% 1990	% 2000	% 2010	% 2020
White alone (NH)	31,742	32,313	32,916	32,246	31,427	96.21%	95.55%	94.79%	93.47%	91.22%
Black or African American alone (NH)	16	25	45	79	100	0.05%	0.07%	0.13%	0.23%	0.29%
Native American or Alaska Native alone (NH)	16	31	46	46	25	0.05%	0.09%	0.13%	0.13%	0.07%
Asian alone (NH)	17	24	61	78	61	0.05%	0.07%	0.18%	0.23%	0.18%
Native Hawaiian or Pacific Islander alone (NH)	x	x	1	3	3	x	x	0.00%	0.01%	0.01%
Other race alone (NH)	6	8	9	4	61	0.02%	0.02%	0.03%	0.01%	0.18%
Mixed race or Multiracial (NH)	x	x	127	153	545	x	x	0.37%	0.44%	1.58%
Hispanic or Latino (any race)	1,194	1,418	1,521	1,890	2,229	3.62%	4.19%	4.38%	5.48%	6.47%
Total	32,991	33,819	34,726	34,499	34,451	100.00%	100.00%	100.00%	100.00%	100.00%

=== 2020 census ===
As of the 2020 census, the county had a population of 34,451. The median age was 40.2 years. 25.5% of residents were under the age of 18 and 18.1% of residents were 65 years of age or older. For every 100 females there were 100.3 males, and for every 100 females age 18 and over there were 98.9 males age 18 and over.

The racial makeup of the county was 93.1% White, 0.4% Black or African American, 0.2% American Indian and Alaska Native, 0.2% Asian, <0.1% Native Hawaiian and Pacific Islander, 2.9% from some other race, and 3.3% from two or more races. Hispanic or Latino residents of any race comprised 6.5% of the population.

15.8% of residents lived in urban areas, while 84.2% lived in rural areas.

There were 12,976 households in the county, of which 31.9% had children under the age of 18 living in them. Of all households, 61.4% were married-couple households, 15.3% were households with a male householder and no spouse or partner present, and 18.8% were households with a female householder and no spouse or partner present. About 24.1% of all households were made up of individuals and 11.9% had someone living alone who was 65 years of age or older.

There were 13,824 housing units, of which 6.1% were vacant. Among occupied housing units, 83.8% were owner-occupied and 16.2% were renter-occupied. The homeowner vacancy rate was 0.9% and the rental vacancy rate was 6.9%.

=== 2010 census ===
As of the 2010 United States census, there were 34,499 people, 12,872 households, and 9,556 families living in the county. The population density was 71.5 inhabitants per square mile (27.6/km^{2}). There were 13,731 housing units at an average density of 28.5 per square mile (11.0/km^{2}). The racial makeup of the county was 95.7% white, 0.3% black or African American, 0.2% Asian, 0.2% American Indian, 2.7% from other races, and 0.9% from two or more races. Those of Hispanic or Latino origin made up 5.5% of the population. In terms of ancestry, 65.6% identified as German, 7.8% were Irish, 7.3% were American, 4.7% were English, 2.4% were French, 1.8% were Swiss, 1.7% were Dutch, 1.6% were Italian, 1.4% were Scottish, 1.0% were Welsh, 0.8% were Hungarian and 0.8% were Polish.

Of the 12,872 households, 35.0% had children under the age of 18 living with them, 62.9% were married couples living together, 7.4% had a female householder with no husband present, 25.8% were non-families, and 22.5% of all households were made up of individuals. The average household size was 2.66 and the average family size was 3.13. The median age was 39.0 years.

The median income for a household in the county was $56,573 and the median income for a family was $65,882. Males had a median income of $44,417 versus $33,200 for females. The per capita income for the county was $24,023. About 5.8% of families and 7.1% of the population were below the poverty line, including 9.8% of those under age 18 and 7.0% of those age 65 or over.

=== 2000 census ===
As of the census of 2000, there were 34,726 people, 12,200 households, and 9,308 families living in the county. The population density was 72 people per square mile (28 people/km^{2}). There were 12,753 housing units at an average density of 26 per square mile (10/km^{2}). The racial makeup of the county was 96.26% White, 0.17% Black or African American, 0.15% Native American, 0.18% Asian, 0.01% Pacific Islander, 2.51% from other races, and 0.73% from two or more races. 4.38% of the population were Hispanic or Latino of any race.

There were 12,200 households, out of which 39.20% had children under the age of 18 living with them, 64.90% were married couples living together, 7.40% had a female householder with no husband present, and 23.70% were non-families. 21.30% of all households were made up of individuals, and 10.50% had someone living alone who was 65 years of age or older. The average household size was 2.81 and the average family size was 3.29.

In the county, the population was spread out, with 29.70% under the age of 18, 8.30% from 18 to 24, 28.10% from 25 to 44, 20.60% from 45 to 64, and 13.30% who were 65 years of age or older. The median age was 35 years. For every 100 females there were 98.50 males. For every 100 females age 18 and over, there were 97.00 males.

The median income for a household in the county was $46,426, and the median income for a family was $52,859. Males had a median income of $36,548 versus $23,963 for females. The per capita income for the county was $18,680. About 4.00% of families and 5.60% of the population were below the poverty line, including 6.40% of those under age 18 and 9.80% of those age 65 or over.

== Politics ==
Prior to 1940, Putnam County was a Democratic Party county stronghold presidential elections, with James M. Cox in 1920 being the only Democrat to lose it before that year. But starting with the 1940 election, it has become a Republican stronghold. The only 2 Democrats to win the county since then are Harry S. Truman in 1948 and Lyndon B. Johnson in 1964.

Putnam County is known for its strong social conservatism. In November 2023, it gave only 17% of the vote to Ohio Issue 1, which legalized abortion, and 31% to Ohio Issue 2, which legalized recreational marijuana. In both referendums, this was the lowest percentage for any county in Ohio.

United States presidential election results for Putnam County, Ohio
Year	Republican		Democratic		Third party(ies)	
Year	No.	%	No.	%	No.	%
1856	790	41.36%	1,116	58.43%	4	0.21%
1860	1,010	40.48%	1,478	59.24%	7	0.28%
1864	1,120	39.53%	1,713	60.47%	0	0.00%
1868	1,184	37.15%	2,003	62.85%	0	0.00%
1872	1,275	37.22%	2,131	62.20%	20	0.58%
1876	1,606	33.56%	3,174	66.33%	5	0.10%
1880	1,851	34.94%	3,417	64.50%	30	0.57%
1884	2,194	35.11%	4,009	64.15%	46	0.74%
1888	2,355	34.61%	4,261	62.62%	189	2.78%
1892	2,314	33.73%	4,177	60.89%	369	5.38%
1896	2,728	33.68%	5,303	65.48%	68	0.84%
1900	2,817	35.89%	4,943	62.98%	88	1.12%
1904	2,853	39.48%	4,145	57.36%	228	3.16%
1908	2,483	33.17%	4,836	64.61%	166	2.22%
1912	1,000	15.60%	4,000	62.40%	1,410	22.00%
1916	2,243	33.84%	4,294	64.79%	91	1.37%
1920	5,157	52.10%	4,673	47.21%	69	0.70%
1924	4,377	41.83%	4,795	45.82%	1,293	12.36%
1928	5,537	49.20%	5,667	50.36%	50	0.44%
1932	3,646	30.69%	8,078	68.00%	155	1.30%
1936	4,151	33.16%	5,786	46.23%	2,580	20.61%
1940	8,946	70.99%	3,655	29.01%	0	0.00%
1944	8,004	71.79%	3,145	28.21%	0	0.00%
1948	5,006	49.33%	5,114	50.39%	28	0.28%
1952	8,398	68.85%	3,799	31.15%	0	0.00%
1956	8,408	70.38%	3,538	29.62%	0	0.00%
1960	6,834	53.09%	6,039	46.91%	0	0.00%
1964	5,221	42.67%	7,014	57.33%	0	0.00%
1968	7,188	59.38%	3,530	29.16%	1,387	11.46%
1972	8,185	66.32%	3,729	30.21%	428	3.47%
1976	7,332	57.69%	5,035	39.61%	343	2.70%
1980	9,752	68.71%	3,742	26.37%	699	4.92%
1984	11,936	78.26%	3,194	20.94%	121	0.79%
1988	11,183	73.09%	4,004	26.17%	114	0.75%
1992	9,338	54.92%	3,962	23.30%	3,704	21.78%
1996	9,294	57.52%	4,972	30.77%	1,892	11.71%
2000	12,837	74.01%	4,063	23.43%	444	2.56%
2004	14,370	76.24%	4,392	23.30%	87	0.46%
2008	13,072	69.98%	5,281	28.27%	327	1.75%
2012	13,721	74.57%	4,318	23.47%	361	1.96%
2016	14,961	79.34%	2,922	15.50%	974	5.17%
2020	16,412	82.28%	3,195	16.02%	340	1.70%
2024	16,576	83.55%	2,996	15.10%	268	1.35%

United States Senate election results for Putnam County, Ohio1
Year	Republican		Democratic		Third party(ies)	
Year	No.	%	No.	%	No.	%
2024	15,582	79.08%	3,573	18.13%	549	2.79%

== Education ==
The Putnam County Board of Education operates nine separate school districts county-wide.

- Columbus Grove Local School, Putnam County, Ohio
  - St. Anthony's Elementary
- Continental Local School, Putnam County, Ohio
- Fort Jennings Local School District, Putnam County, Ohio
- Kalida Local School District, Putnam County, Ohio
- Leipsic Local School District, Putnam County, Ohio
  - Leipsic St. Mary's Elementary
- McComb Local School District, Hancock County, Ohio (mostly in Hancock County)
- Miller City-New Cleveland Local School District, Putnam County, Ohio
- Ottawa-Glandorf Local School District, Putnam County, Ohio
  - St. Peter and Paul Elementary
  - Ottawa Elementary
  - Glandorf Elementary
- Ottoville Local School District, Putnam County, Ohio
- Pandora-Gilboa Local School, Putnam County, Ohio

Other villages across the county are served by one or more of these districts above in the district's zone area.

== Transportation ==
The Putnam County Airport is located three nautical miles (3.5 mi; 5.6 km) northeast of Ottawa's central business district.

== Communities ==
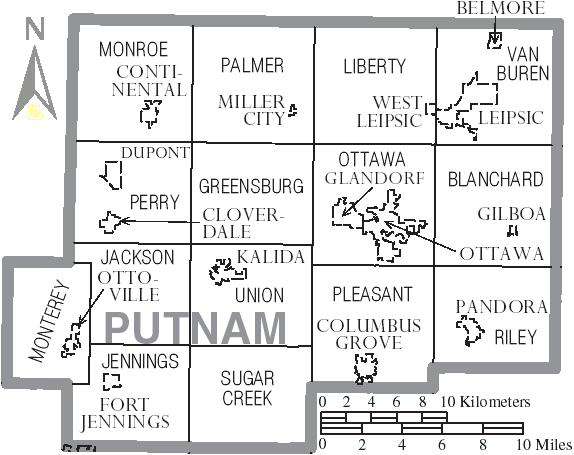
Map of Putnam County, Ohio with municipal and township labels

=== Villages ===
- Belmore
- Cloverdale
- Columbus Grove
- Continental
- Dupont
- Fort Jennings
- Gilboa
- Glandorf
- Kalida
- Leipsic
- Miller City
- Ottawa (county seat)
- Ottoville
- Pandora
- West Leipsic

=== Townships ===
- Blanchard
- Greensburg
- Jackson
- Jennings
- Liberty
- Monroe
- Monterey
- Ottawa
- Palmer
- Perry
- Pleasant
- Riley
- Sugar Creek
- Union
- Van Buren

=== Census-designated place ===
- Vaughnsville

=== Unincorporated communities ===
- Avis
- Cascade
- Crosswell
- Cuba
- Dorninton
- Douglas
- Elm Center
- Hartsburg
- Hector
- Jones City
- Kieferville
- Muntanna
- New Cleveland
- North Creek
- Prentiss
- Rice
- Rimer
- Rushmore
- Townwood
- Wisterman

== See also ==
- National Register of Historic Places listings in Putnam County, Ohio
- Putnam County, New York
