= Ottawa Township, Putnam County, Ohio =

Township in Ohio, US

- Township
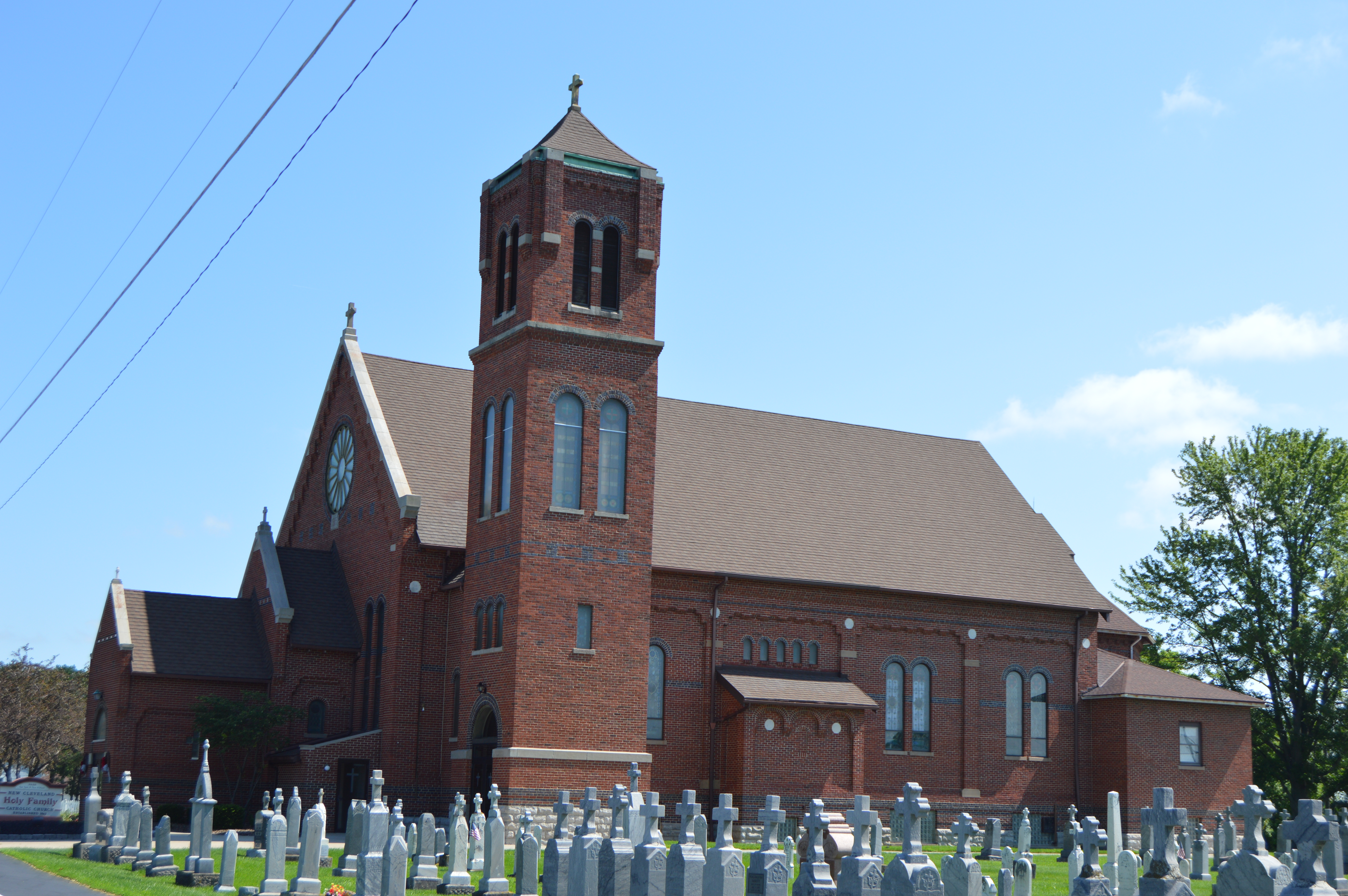
- Holy Family Catholic Church at New Cleveland

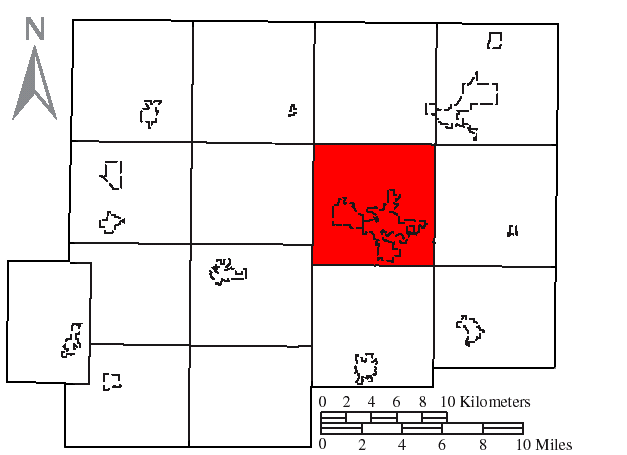
- Location of Ottawa Township in Putnam County
- Coordinates: 41°1′28″N 84°2′43″W
- Country: United States
- State: Ohio
- County: Putnam

Area
  - Total: 36.3 sq mi (93.9 km^{2})
  - Land: 36.2 sq mi (93.8 km^{2})
  - Water: 0.039 sq mi (0.1 km^{2})
- Elevation: 709 ft (216 m)

Population (2020)
  - Total: 8,034
  - Density: 222/sq mi (85.7/km^{2})
- Time zone: UTC-5 (Eastern (EST))
  - Summer (DST): UTC-4 (EDT)
- ZIP code: 45875
- Area code: 419
- FIPS code: 39-58996
- GNIS feature ID: 1086864

Ottawa Township is one of the fifteen townships of Putnam County, Ohio, United States. The 2020 census found 8,034 people in the township.

== Geography ==
Located in the central part of the county, it borders the following townships:

- Liberty Township - north
- Van Buren Township - northeast corner
- Blanchard Township - east
- Riley Township - southeast corner
- Pleasant Township - south
- Union Township - southwest
- Greensburg Township - west
- Palmer Township - northwest corner

Two villages are located in central Ottawa Township: Ottawa, the largest village in and county seat of Putnam County; and Glandorf, which lies northwest of Ottawa.

== Name and history ==
Ottawa Township was established in 1835. Named for the Ottawa Indians, it is the only Ottawa Township statewide.

== Government ==
The township is governed by a three-member board of trustees, who are elected in November of odd-numbered years to a four-year term beginning on the following January 1. Two are elected in the year after the presidential election and one is elected in the year before it. There is also an elected township fiscal officer, who serves a four-year term beginning on April 1 of the year after the election, which is held in November of the year before the presidential election. Vacancies in the fiscal officership or on the board of trustees are filled by the remaining trustees.
