= Pleasant Township, Putnam County, Ohio =

Township in Ohio, US

- Township
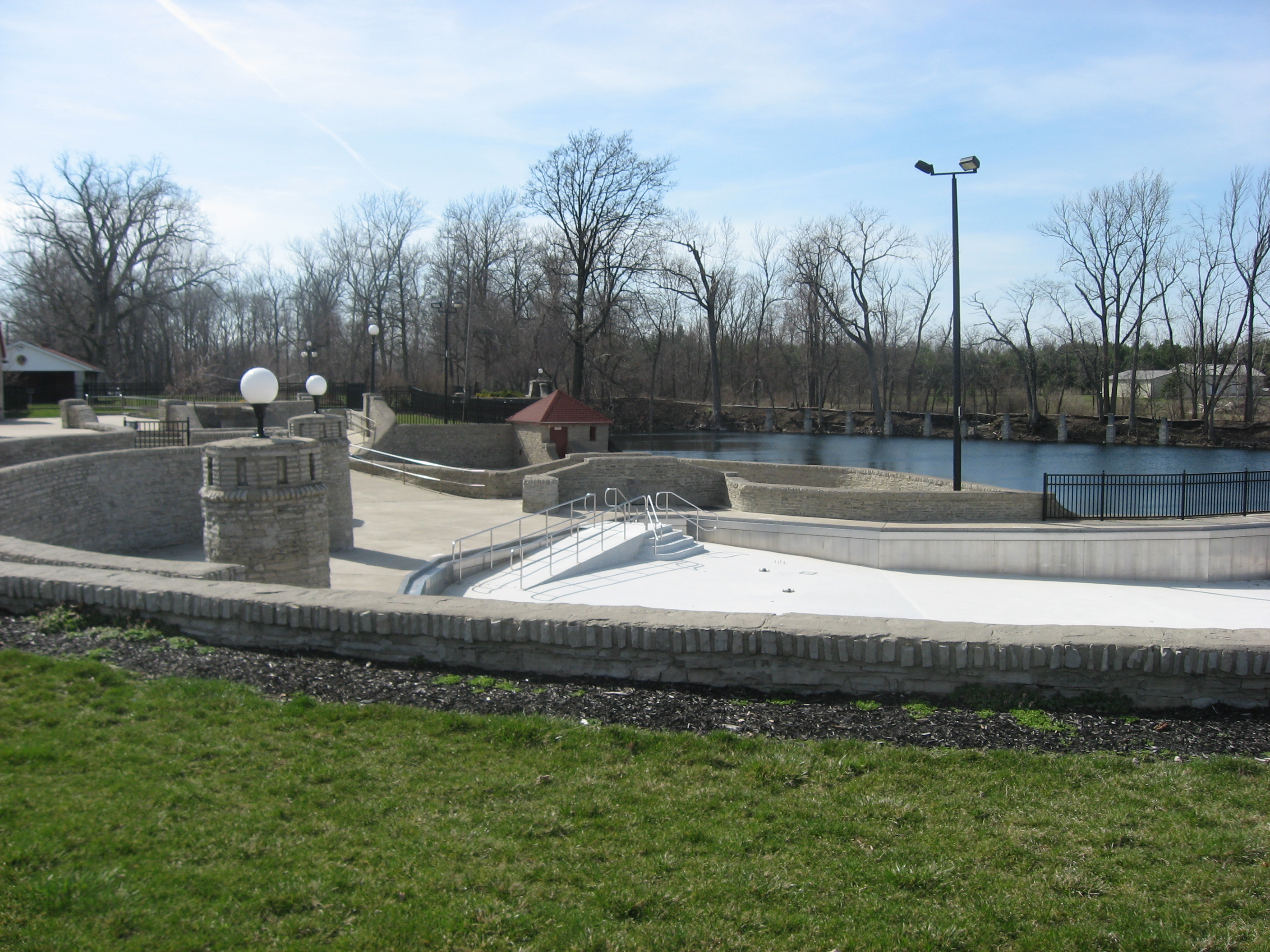
- Columbus Grove Municipal Pool, a historic site in the township

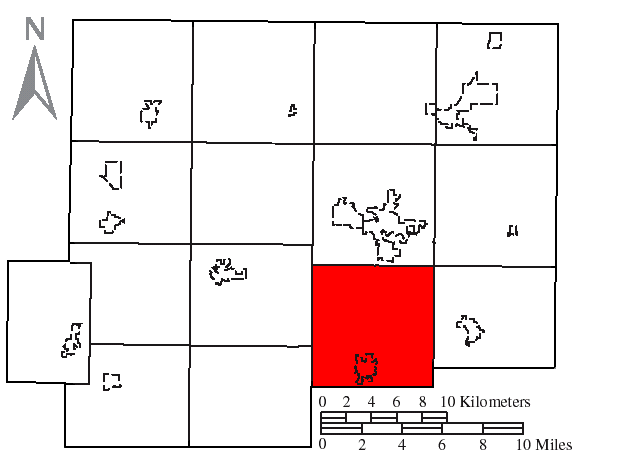
- Location of Pleasant Township in Putnam County
- Coordinates: 40°56′21″N 84°3′5″W
- Country: United States
- State: Ohio
- County: Putnam

Area
  - Total: 36.5 sq mi (94.5 km^{2})
  - Land: 36.5 sq mi (94.5 km^{2})
  - Water: 0 sq mi (0.0 km^{2})
- Elevation: 758 ft (231 m)

Population (2020)
  - Total: 3,794
  - Density: 104/sq mi (40.1/km^{2})
- Time zone: UTC-5 (Eastern (EST))
  - Summer (DST): UTC-4 (EDT)
- FIPS code: 39-63380
- GNIS feature ID: 1086867

Pleasant Township is one of the fifteen townships of Putnam County, Ohio, United States. The 2020 census found 3,794 people in the township.

== Geography ==
Located in the southern part of the county, it borders the following townships:

- Ottawa Township - north
- Blanchard Township - northeast corner
- Riley Township - east
- Richland Township, Allen County - southeast
- Monroe Township, Allen County - south
- Sugar Creek Township - southwest
- Union Township - west

The village of Columbus Grove is located in southern Pleasant Township.

== Name and history ==
Pleasant Township was organized in 1834. It is one of fifteen Pleasant Townships statewide.

== Government ==
The township is governed by a three-member board of trustees, who are elected in November of odd-numbered years to a four-year term beginning on the following January 1. Two are elected in the year after the presidential election and one is elected in the year before it. There is also an elected township fiscal officer, who serves a four-year term beginning on April 1 of the year after the election, which is held in November of the year before the presidential election. Vacancies in the fiscal officership or on the board of trustees are filled by the remaining trustees.
