= Union Township, Putnam County, Ohio =

Township in Ohio, US

- Township
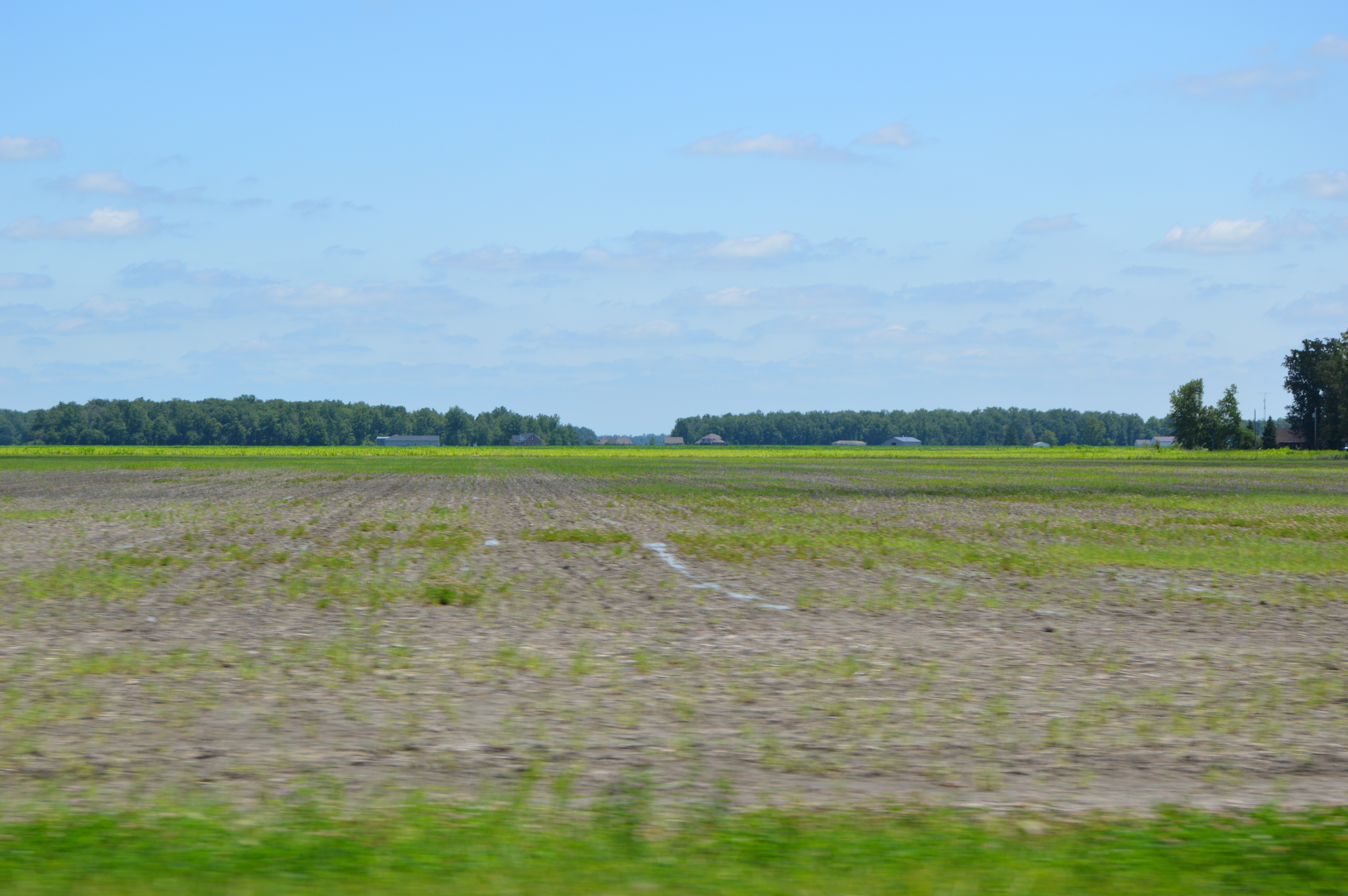
- Flood-damaged fields north of Kalida

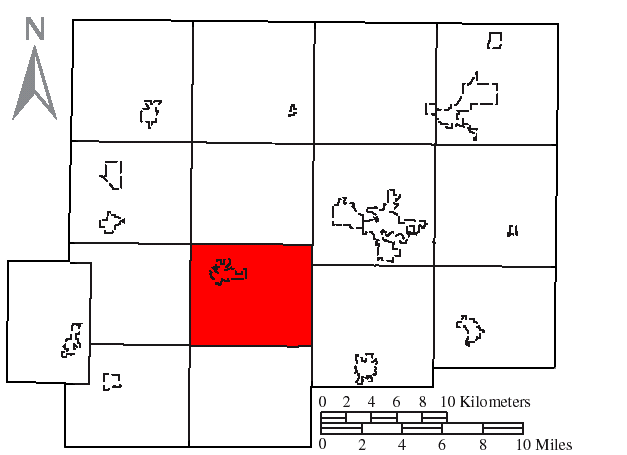
- Location of Union Township in Putnam County
- Coordinates: 40°58′28″N 84°10′31″W
- Country: United States
- State: Ohio
- County: Putnam

Area
  - Total: 30.4 sq mi (78.7 km^{2})
  - Land: 30.4 sq mi (78.7 km^{2})
  - Water: 0 sq mi (0.0 km^{2})
- Elevation: 728 ft (222 m)

Population (2020)
  - Total: 2,945
  - Density: 96.9/sq mi (37.4/km^{2})
- Time zone: UTC-5 (Eastern (EST))
  - Summer (DST): UTC-4 (EDT)
- FIPS code: 39-78526
- GNIS feature ID: 1086870

Union Township is one of the fifteen townships of Putnam County, Ohio, United States. The 2020 census found 2,945 people in the township.

== Geography ==
Located in the central part of the county, it borders the following townships:

- Greensburg Township - north
- Ottawa Township - northeast
- Pleasant Township - east
- Sugar Creek Township - south
- Jennings Township - southwest corner
- Jackson Township - west
- Perry Township - northwest corner

The village of Kalida is located in northwestern Union Township.

== Name and history ==
Union Township was erected in 1832. It is one of twenty-seven Union Townships statewide.

== Government ==
The township is governed by a three-member board of trustees, who are elected in November of odd-numbered years to a four-year term beginning on the following January 1. Two are elected in the year after the presidential election and one is elected in the year before it. There is also an elected township fiscal officer, who serves a four-year term beginning on April 1 of the year after the election, which is held in November of the year before the presidential election. Vacancies in the fiscal officership or on the board of trustees are filled by the remaining trustees.
