= Greensburg Township, Putnam County, Ohio =

Township in Ohio, US

- Township
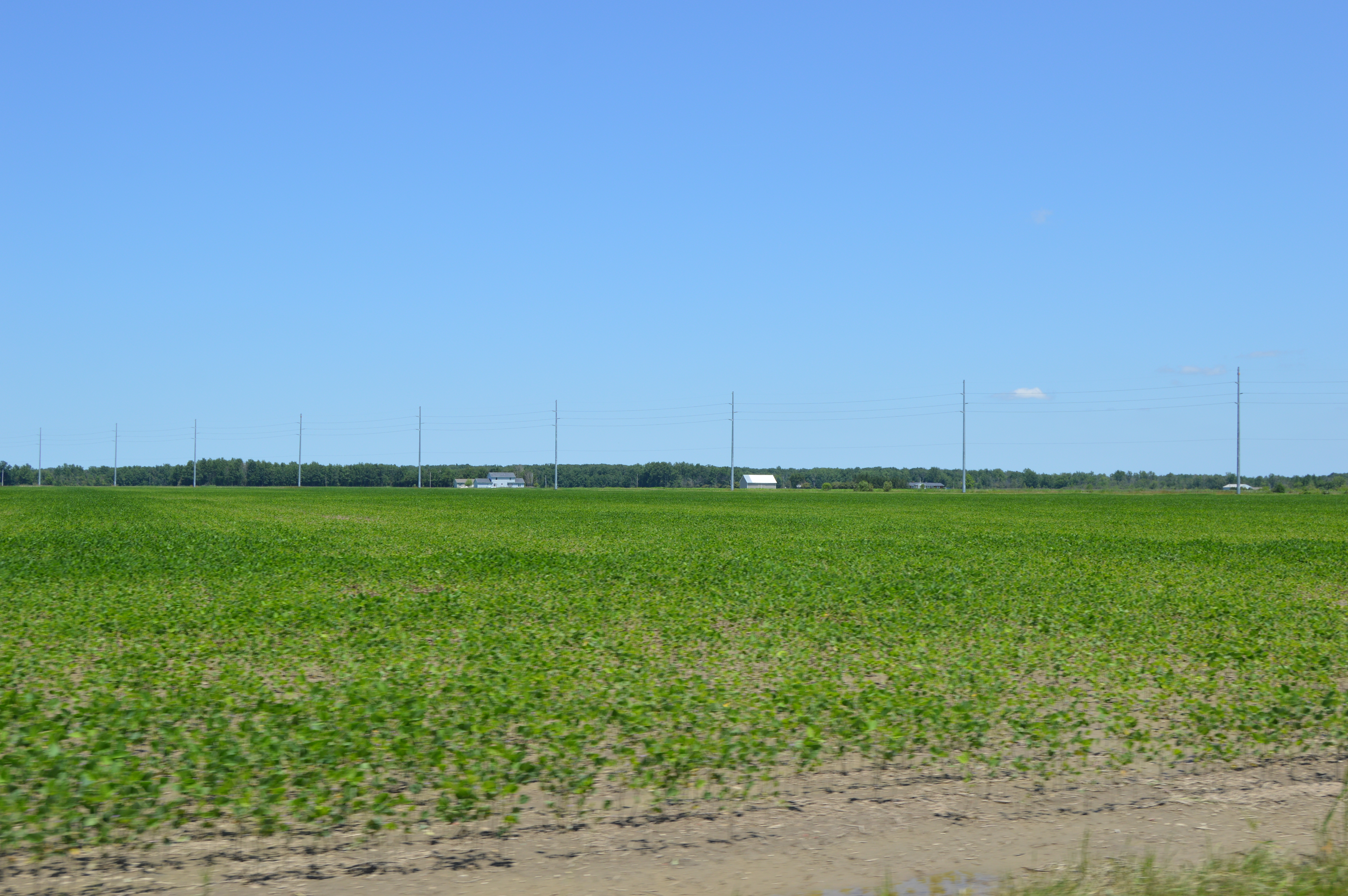
- Fields northwest of Kalida

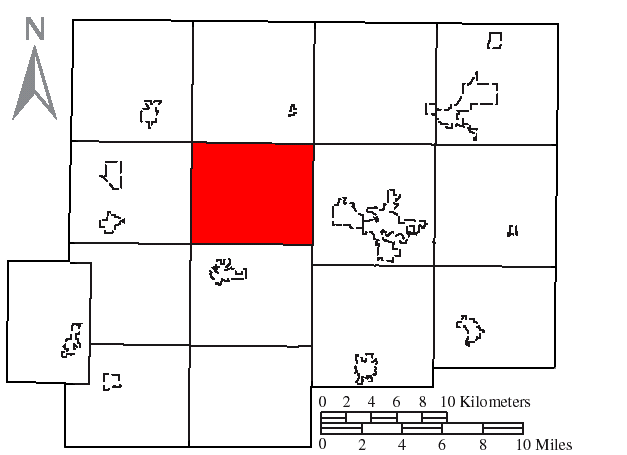
- Location of Greensburg Township in Putnam County
- Coordinates: 41°2′56″N 84°10′16″W
- Country: United States
- State: Ohio
- County: Putnam

Area
  - Total: 30.2 sq mi (78.3 km^{2})
  - Land: 30.2 sq mi (78.3 km^{2})
  - Water: 0 sq mi (0.0 km^{2})
- Elevation: 728 ft (222 m)

Population (2020)
  - Total: 1,427
  - Density: 47.2/sq mi (18.2/km^{2})
- Time zone: UTC-5 (Eastern (EST))
  - Summer (DST): UTC-4 (EDT)
- FIPS code: 39-32228
- GNIS feature ID: 1086858

Greensburg Township is one of the fifteen townships of Putnam County, Ohio, United States. The 2020 census found 1,427 people in the township.

== Geography ==
Located in the central part of the county, it borders the following townships:

- Palmer Township – north
- Liberty Township – northeast corner
- Ottawa Township – east
- Union Township – south
- Jackson Township – southwest corner
- Perry Township – west
- Monroe Township – northwest corner

No municipalities are located in Greensburg Township.

== Name and history ==
The only Greensburg Township statewide, it was organized in 1835. The origin of the name Greensburg is unclear.

== Government ==
The township is governed by a three-member board of trustees, who are elected in November of odd-numbered years to a four-year term beginning on the following January 1. Two are elected in the year after the presidential election and one is elected in the year before it. There is also an elected township fiscal officer, who serves a four-year term beginning on April 1 of the year after the election, which is held in November of the year before the presidential election. Vacancies in the fiscal officership or on the board of trustees are filled by the remaining trustees.
