= List of OHSAA basketball champions =

The Ohio High School Athletic Association (OHSAA) is the governing body of athletic programs for junior and senior high schools in the state of Ohio. It conducts state championship competitions in all the OHSAA-sanctioned sports.

== Boys' basketball champions ==
Year	D I / AAA	D II / AA	D III / A	D IV	D V	D VI	D VII
2026	Cincinnati Princeton	Massillon Washington	Trotwood-Madison	Cincinnati Wyoming	Cleveland Heights Lutheran East	Berlin Hiland	Delphos St. John's
2025	Olentangy Orange	Westerville North	Louisville	Maysville	Cleveland Heights Lutheran East	Monroe Central	Russia
2024	Cleveland St. Ignatius	Kettering Archbishop Alter	Cleveland Heights Lutheran East	Richmond Heights			
2023	Akron Archbishop Hoban	Akron Buchtel	Cleveland Heights Lutheran East	Richmond Heights			
2022	Pickerington Central	Akron St. Vincent St. Mary	Cincinnati Taft	Richmond Heights			
2021	Centerville	Akron St. Vincent St. Mary	Cleveland Heights Lutheran East	Botkins			
2020	Tournament canceled	Tournament canceled	Tournament canceled	Tournament canceled			
2019	Cincinnati Archbishop Moeller	Trotwood-Madison	Canal Winchester Harvest Prep	Convoy Crestview			
2018	Cincinnati Archbishop Moeller	Akron St. Vincent St. Mary	Cincinnati Deer Park	Maria Stein Marion Local			
2017	Jackson	Akron St. Vincent St. Mary	Cleveland Villa Angela-St. Joseph	Cleveland Heights Lutheran East			
2016	Westerville South	New Concord John Glenn	Lima Central Catholic	Willoughby Hills Cornerstone Christian			
2015	Huber Heights Wayne	Defiance	Cleveland Villa Angela-St. Joseph	New Madison Tri-Village			
2014	Lakewood St. Edward	Norwalk	Lima Central Catholic	Convoy Crestview			
2013	Mentor	Columbus Bishop Watterson	Ottawa-Glandorf	Cleveland Villa Angela-St. Joseph			
2012	Pickerington Central	Dayton Dunbar	Cincinnati Summit Country Day	Berlin Hiland			
2011	Cincinnati La Salle	Akron St. Vincent St. Mary	Cincinnati Taft	Berlin Hiland			
2010	Jackson	Dayton Dunbar	Lima Central Catholic	Dayton Jefferson Township			
2009	Columbus Northland	Akron St. Vincent St. Mary	Cleveland Central Catholic	Oak Hill			
2008	Newark	Chillicothe	Ottawa-Glandorf	New Knoxville			
2007	Cincinnati Archbishop Moeller	Dayton Dunbar	Cincinnati North College Hill	Georgetown			
2006	Canton McKinley	Dayton Dunbar	Cincinnati North College Hill	South Webster			
2005	Canton McKinley	Upper Sandusky	Cincinnati North College Hill	Cleveland Heights Lutheran East *			
2004	Hamilton	Ottawa-Glandorf	St. Henry	Holgate			
2003	Cincinnati Archbishop Moeller	Akron St. Vincent St. Mary	Reading	Maria Stein Marion Local			
2002	Columbus Brookhaven	St. Bernard Roger Bacon	Bellville Clear Fork	Delphos St. John's			
2001	Cleveland St. Ignatius	Kettering Archbishop Alter	Akron St. Vincent St. Mary	Tipp City Bethel			
2000	Cincinnati St. Xavier	Warrensville Heights	Akron St. Vincent St. Mary	Fort Jennings			
1999	Cincinnati Archbishop Moeller	Kettering Archbishop Alter	Bedford St. Peter Chanel	Worthington Christian			
1998	Lakewood St. Edward	Cleveland Benedictine	Sparta Highland	Dayton Jefferson Township			
1997	Cleveland Heights	Cleveland Benedictine	Hamler Patrick Henry	Van Wert Lincolnview			
1996	Cincinnati La Salle	Orrville	Casstown Miami East	Springfield Catholic Central			
1995	Zanesville	Cleveland Villa-Angela/St. Joseph	Orrville	Findlay Liberty-Benton			
1994	Westerville North	Cleveland Villa-Angela/St. Joseph	Youngstown Ursuline	McGuffey Upper Scioto Valley			
1993	Cincinnati Elder	Girard	Campbell Memorial	Fort Loramie			
1992	West Chester Lakota	Cleveland Villa-Angela/St. Joseph	Orrville	Berlin Hiland			
1991	Cleveland Villa-Angela/St. Joseph	Lexington	Haviland Wayne Trace	St. Henry			
1990	Toledo Scott	Dayton Colonel White	St. Henry	Columbus Wehrle			
1989	Toledo Macomber	Lexington	Akron Archbishop Hoban	Columbus Wehrle			
1988	Cincinnati Woodward	Portsmouth	Hamilton Badin	Columbus Wehrle			
1987	Dayton Dunbar	Columbus St. Francis De Sales	Fort Loramie				
1986	Akron Central-Hower	Oberlin	Columbus Wehrle				
1985	Cincinnati Purcell Marian	Youngstown Rayen	Jackson Center				
1984	Canton McKinley	Akron St. Vincent St. Mary	Monroeville				
1983	Toledo St. Francis De Sales	Columbus Bexley	Delphos St. John's				
1982	St. Bernard Roger Bacon	Dayton Roth	Middletown Bishop Fenwick				
1981	Dayton Roth	Napoleon	Kalida				
1980	Akron Central-Hower	Hamilton Ross	Sandusky St. Mary Central Catholic				
1979	Columbus East	Dayton Jefferson Township	St. Henry				
1978	Kettering Archbishop Alter	Portsmouth	Mansfield St. Peter's				
1977	Columbus Linden McKinley	Cleveland Cathedral Latin	Fort Loramie				
1976	Barberton	Dayton Roth	Gnadenhutten Indian Valley				
1975	Columbus Linden McKinley	Warsaw River View	Maria Stein Marion Local				
1974	Cincinnati Elder	Manchester	Lorain Clearview				
1973	Cincinnati Elder	Columbus Bishop Ready	Marion Pleasant				
1972	Cleveland East Technical	Columbus Bishop Ready	Gnadenhutten Indian Valley				
1971	Columbus Walnut Ridge	Canton Lehman	Fort Recovery				
1970		Dayton Chaminade-Julienne	Cincinnati Lincoln Heights				
1969		Columbus East	Arcanum				
1968		Columbus East	Mansfield St. Peter's				
1967		Columbus Linden McKinley	Strasburg-Franklin				
1966		Dayton Chaminade-Julienne	New Lebanon Dixie				
1965		Columbus South	West Salem Northwestern				
1964		Dayton Belmont	Dresden Jefferson				
1963		Columbus East	Dresden Jefferson				
1962		Hamilton Taft	New Lebanon Dixie				
1961		Portsmouth	Defiance Ayersville				
1960		Dayton Roosevelt	Salem Local				
1959		Cleveland East Technical	Edgerton				
1958		Cleveland East Technical	West Salem Northwestern				
1957		Middletown	Defiance Ayersville				
1956		Middletown	Arcanum				
1955		Zanesville	Lockland Wayne				
1954		Hamilton	New Lexington St. Aloysius				
1953		Middletown	Cincinnati Mariemont				
1952		Middletown	Lockland Wayne				
1951		Columbus East	Grand Rapids				
1950		Springfield	Miller City				
1949		Hamilton	Delphos St. John's				
1948		Findlay	Eaton				
1947		Middletown	Columbiana				
1946		Middletown	Farmer				
1945		Bellevue	Dayton Northridge				
1944		Middletown	Akron Ellet				
1943		Newark	Yorkville				
1942		Xenia	Somerset				
1941		Martins Ferry	Glenford				
1940		New Philadelphia	New Carlisle				
1939		Akron North	North Canton				
1938		Newark	Canal Fulton				
1937		Hamilton	Upper Arlington				
1936		Newark	Sandusky St. Mary Central Catholic				
1935		Akron North	Waterloo High School (Lawrence County)				
1934		Dayton Roosevelt	Waterloo High School (Lawrence County)				
1933		Dover	Lawrenceville				
1932		Akron West	Castalia Margaretta				
1931		Portsmouth	Austintown-Fitch				
1930		Dayton Stivers	Lancaster St. Mary's				
1929		Dayton Stivers	Akron St. Mary				
1928		Dayton Stivers	Marshall High School				
1927		Dover	Kent State High				
1926		Zanesville	Oberlin				
1925		Springfield	Bellpoint				
1924		Dayton Stivers	Bellpoint				
1923		Lorain	Plattsburg				

* Columbus Africentric forfeited the 2005 D4 title after the discovery of an ineligible player.

== Girls' basketball champions ==
Year	D I / AAA	D II / AA	D III / A	D IV	D V	D VI	D VII
2026	Kettering Fairmont	Akron Archbishop Hoban	Dayton Chaminade Julienne	Shaker Heights Laurel	Portsmouth	St. Henry	Strasburg-Franklin
2025	Pickerington Central	Cincinnati Winton Woods	Cincinnati Purcell Marian	Bellevue	Portsmouth	Columbus Grove	Waterford
2024	Olmsted Falls	Cincinnati Purcell Marian	Columbus Africentric	Fort Loramie			
2023	Cincinnati Princeton	Cincinnati Purcell Marian	Columbus Africentric	New Madison Tri-Village			
2022	Reynoldsburg	Kettering Archbishop Alter	Cincinnati Purcell Marian	Waterford			
2021	Cincinnati Mount Notre Dame	Napoleon	Berlin Hiland	Fort Loramie			
2020	Tournament canceled	Tournament canceled	Tournament canceled	Tournament canceled			
2019	Cincinnati Mount Notre Dame	Toledo Rogers	Columbus Africentric	Minster			
2018	Pickerington Central	Toledo Rogers	Columbus Africentric	Minster			
2017	Cincinnati Mount Notre Dame	Kettering Archbishop Alter	Gates Mills Gilmour	Berlin Hiland			
2016	Wadsworth	Kettering Archbishop Alter	Columbus Africentric	Waterford			
2015	West Chester Lakota West	Kettering Archbishop Alter	Versailles	Fort Loramie			
2014	Cincinnati Princeton	Millersburg West Holmes	Columbus Africentric	Reedsville Eastern			
2013	Kettering Fairmont	Shaker Heights Hathaway Brown	Anna	Fort Loramie			
2012	Twinsburg	Shaker Heights Hathaway Brown	Columbus Africentric	Arlington			
2011	Twinsburg	Shaker Heights Hathaway Brown	Anna	Canal Winchester Harvest Preparatory			
2010	Canton McKinley	Shaker Heights Hathaway Brown	Findlay Liberty-Benton	Canal Winchester Harvest Preparatory			
2009	Cincinnati Mount Notre Dame	Shaker Heights Hathaway Brown	South Euclid Regina	Columbus Africentric			
2008	Cincinnati Mount Notre Dame	Kettering Archbishop Alter	Versailles	Berlin Hiland			
2007	Cincinnati Mount Notre Dame	Warsaw River View	Cleveland Central Catholic	Columbus Africentric			
2006	Cincinnati Mount Notre Dame	Warsaw River View	Plain City Jonathan Alder	Berlin Hiland			
2005	Dayton Chaminade-Julienne	Cuyahoga Falls Walsh Jesuit	South Euclid Regina	Berlin Hiland			
2004	Cincinnati Mount Notre Dame	Beloit West Branch	Youngstown Ursuline	Minster			
2003	Beavercreek	Dayton Chaminade-Julienne	South Euclid Regina	Maria Stein Marion Local			
2002	North Canton Hoover	Cleveland East Technical	South Euclid Regina	Delphos St. John's			
2001	Beavercreek	Cincinnati Archbishop McNicholas	South Euclid Regina	Jackson Center			
2000	Mason	Columbus Bishop Hartley	South Euclid Regina	Berlin Hiland			
1999	Pickerington	Dayton Chaminade-Julienne	Cleveland Villa-Angela St. Joseph	Bascom Hopewell-Loudon			
1998	Pickerington	Hamilton Badin	Chagrin Falls	Minster			
1997	Wadsworth	Elida	Wauseon	Kalida			
1996	Columbus Brookhaven	Garfield Heights Trinity	Cincinnati Wyoming	South Charleston Southeastern Local			
1995	Beavercreek	St. Bernard Roger Bacon	Akron St. Vincent-St. Mary	Jackson Center			
1994	Garfield Heights Trinity	Avon Lake	Frankfort Adena	McGuffey Upper Scioto Valley			
1993	Pickerington	Urbana	Baltimore Liberty Union	McGuffey Upper Scioto Valley			
1992	Pickerington	Urbana	Coldwater	Zanesville Bishop Rosecrans			
1991	Celina	Dayton Dunbar	Heath	Fort Recovery			
1990	Pickerington	Garfield Heights Trinity	Coldwater	Fort Recovery			
1989	GlenOak	Byesville Meadowbrook	Sherwood Fairview	Kalida			
1988	Upper Arlington	Akron Archbishop Hoban	Vienna Mathews	Kalida			
1987	Cincinnati Princeton	Lima Bath	Delphos St. John's				
1986	Columbus South	Millersburg West Holmes	Tipp City Bethel				
1985	Pickerington	Millersburg West Holmes	New Washington Buckeye Central				
1984	Cincinnati Forest Park	Millersburg West Holmes	Newark Catholic				
1983	Shelby	Huron	Zanesville Bishop Rosecrans				
1982	Columbus Northland	Warsaw River View	Zanesville Bishop Rosecrans				
1981	Toledo Libbey	Uhrichsville Claymont	Anna				
1980	Akron St. Vincent-St. Mary	Delphos St. John's	Mansfield St. Peter's				
1979	Akron St. Vincent-St. Mary	Delphos St. John's	Lore City Buckeye Trail				
1978	Struthers	Columbus Bishop Hartley	Ada				
1977	Springfield North	Warsaw River View	Delphos St. John's				
1976	Toledo Woodward	Columbus Bishop Hartley	Frankfort Adena				

== See also ==
- List of Ohio High School Athletic Association championships
- List of high schools in Ohio
- Ohio High School Athletic Conferences
- Ohio High School Athletic Association
