= Putnam County League =

The Putnam County League is non-football athletic conference whose eight members are located within Putnam County, Ohio. The league is affiliated with the Ohio High School Athletic Association.

== Members ==
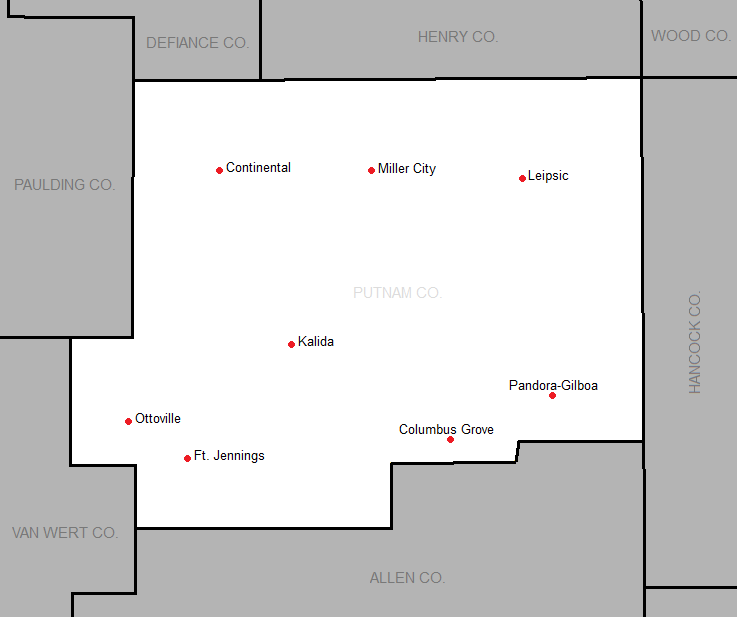
The member schools of the Putnam County League.

| School | Nickname | Location | Colors | Notes |
|---|---|---|---|---|
| Columbus Grove | Bulldogs | Columbus Grove | Scarlet & Gray | Also competes in the NWC, including football |
| Continental | Pirates | Continental | Blue & Gold | |
| Fort Jennings | Musketeers | Fort Jennings | Black & Orange | |
| Kalida | Wildcats | Kalida | Maroon & White | |
| Leipsic | Vikings | Leipsic | Purple & Gold | Also competes in the BVC, including football |
| Miller City | Wildcats | Miller City | Blue & Gold | |
| Ottoville | Big Green | Ottoville | Green & Gold | |
| Pandora-Gilboa | Rockets | Pandora | Scarlet & Gray | Also competes in the BVC, including football |

At the junior high level, three more middle schools are added to the league:

- Glandorf Dragons
- Ottawa Titans
- Ottawa Sts. Peter and Paul Knights

=== Former member schools ===
- Belmore
- Blanchard Eagles (merged into Pandora-Gilboa in 1951)
- Cloverdale (merged into Ottoville in 1930)
- Crawfis College (merged into Blanchard)
- Glandorf (merged into Ottawa-Glandorf)
- Ottawa (merged into Ottawa-Glandorf)
- Ottawa-Glandorf Titans (joined the Western Buckeye League in the spring of 1967.)
- Ottawa Public
- Ottawa SPPS
- Palmer (merged into Miller City in 1941)
- Pandora Fleetwings (merged into Pandora-Gilboa in 1951)
- Vaughnsville Vikings (merged into Columbus Grove in 1962)

== Putnam County League Championships ==
| School Year | Golf | Boys Soccer | Girls Soccer | Volleyball | Boys Basketball | Girls Basketball | Baseball | Boys Track & Field | Girls Track & Field |
|---|---|---|---|---|---|---|---|---|---|
| 1930-31 | | | | | | | Vaughnsville | | |
| 1931-32 | | | | | | | Vaughnsville | | |
| 1932-33 | | | | | | | Columbus Grove | | |
| 1933-34 | | | | | | | Columbus Grove | | |
| 1934-35 | | | | | Ottoville | Leipsic | Pandora | | |
| 1935-36 | | | | | Vaughnsville | Leipsic, Pandora | Vaughnsville | | |
| 1936-37 | | | | | | | Unknown | | |
| 1937-38 | | | | | | | Kalida | | |
| 1938-39 | | | | | | | Kalida | | |
| 1939-40 | | | | | | | Kalida | | |
| 1940-41 | | | | | | | Vaughnsville | | |
| 1941-42 | | | | | Vaughnsville | | Vaughnsville | | |
| 1942-43 | | | | | | | Vaughnsville | | |
| 1943-44 | | | | | Fort Jennings | | Vaughnsville | | |
| 1944-45 | | | | | Fort Jennings, Pandora | | Kalida | | |
| 1945-46 | | | | | Miller City | | Columbus Grove | | |
| 1946-47 | | | | | Ottoville | | Columbus Grove, Miller City | | |
| 1947-48 | | | | | Blanchard | | Blanchard | | |
| 1948-49 | | | | | Blanchard | | Miler City | | |
| 1949-50 | | | | | Miller City | | Ottoville | | |
| 1950-51 | | | | | Columbus Grove, Ottoville | | Fort Jennings | | |
| 1951-52 | | | | | Columbus Grove, Miller City | | Continental | | |
| 1952-53 | | | | | Ottoville | | Columbus Grove | | |
| 1953-54 | | | | | Kalida, Ottoville | | Kalida | | |
| 1954-55 | | | | | Kalida, Leipsic | | Columbus Grove | | |
| 1955-56 | | | | | Miller City | | Columbus Grove | | |
| 1956-57 | | | | | Fort Jennings, Miller City | | Columbus Grove | | |
| 1957-58 | | | | | Miller City | | Leipsic | | |
| 1958-59 | | | | | Ottawa SPPS | | Columbus Grove | | |
| 1959-60 | | | | | Leipsic | | Continental | | |
| 1960-61 | | | | | Glandorf, Miller City | | Continental | | |
| 1961-62 | | | | | Miller City | | Continental | | |
| 1962-63 | | | | | Kalida, Miller City | | Columbus Grove | | |
| 1963-64 | | | | | Kalida, Miller City, Ottoville | | Ottawa Public | | |
| 1964-65 | | | | | Ottawa-Glandorf | | Ottawa-Glandorf | | |
| 1965-66 | | | | | Ottawa-Glandorf | | Ottawa-Glandorf | | |
| 1966-67 | | | | | Ottawa-Glandorf | | Leipsic | | |
| 1967-68 | | | | | Ottoville | | Columbus Grove, Fort Jennings, Leipsic, Ottoville | | |
| 1968-69 | | | | | Fort Jennings | | Fort Jennings, Leipsic | | |
| 1969-70 | | | | | Fort Jennings | | Columbus Grove | | |
| 1970-71 | | | | | Continental | | Columbus Grove | | |
| 1971-72 | | | | | Ottoville | | Columbus Grove | | |
| 1972-73 | | | | | Kalida, Ottoville | | Leipsic | | |
| 1973-74 | | | | | Continental | Fort Jennings | Kalida | | |
| 1974-75 | | | | | Kalida | Miller City | Kalida | | |
| 1975-76 | Ottoville | | | | Continental, Kalida | Miller City | Miller City | | |
| 1976-77 | Ottoville | | | | Continental, Fort Jennings, Kalida | Ottoville | Miller City | | |
| 1977-78 | Leipsic | | | | Continental | Ottoville | Leipsic | | |
| 1978-79 | Kalida | | | | Kalida | Kalida, Ottoville | Ottoville | | |
| 1979-80 | Ottoville | | | | Ottoville | Kalida | Leipsic | | |
| 1980-81 | Ottoville | | | | Fort Jennings, Kalida | Kalida | Miller City | | |
| 1981-82 | Kalida | | | | Kalida, Leipsic | Columbus Grove | Continental, Leipsic | | |
| 1982-83 | Ottoville | | | | Kalida | Kalida | Miller City | | |
| 1983-84 | Kalida | | | | Columbus Grove | Continental, Ottoville | Miller City, Ottoville | | |
| 1984-85 | Ottoville | | | | Miller City | Fort Jennings | Miller City | | |
| 1985-86 | Ottoville | | | | Continental | Kalida | Miller City | | |
| 1986-87 | Ottoville | | | | Fort Jennings | Kalida, Miller City, Pandora-Gilboa | Ottoville | | |
| 1987-88 | Ottoville | | | | Kalida | Kalida | Miller City | | |
| 1988-89 | Fort Jennings | | | | Kalida | Kalida | Leipsic | | |
| 1989-90 | Kalida | | | | Miller City | Ottoville | Miller City | | |
| 1990-91 | Kalida | | | | Fort Jennings, Kalida, Miller City | Kalida | Kalida | | |
| 1991-92 | Kalida | | | | Kalida | Kalida | Kalida | | |
| 1992-93 | Kalida | | | | Leipsic | Continental, Leipsic | Leipsic, Miller City | | |
| 1993-94 | Kalida | | | | Miller City | Fort Jennings | Kalida | | |
| 1994-95 | Kalida | | | | Columbus Grove, Kalida | Leipsic, Ottoville | Columbus Grove, Kalida, Leipsic | | |
| 1995-96 | Kalida | | | | Kalida | Ottoville | Columbus Grove, Kalida | | |
| 1996-97 | Kalida | | | | Leipsic | Kalida | Leipsic | | |
| 1997-98 | Kalida | | | | Continental, Fort Jennings, Kalida | Kalida | Kalida, Leipsic | | |
| 1998-99 | Kalida | | | | Fort Jennings | Ottoville | Leipsic, Miller City | | |
| 1999-00 | Kalida | | | | Kalida | Ottoville, Pandora-Gilboa | Fort Jennings | | |
| 2000-01 | Continental | | | | Kalida | Ottoville | GO VOLS | | |
| 2001-02 | Kalida | | | | Ottoville | Kalida, Miller City | Pandora-Gilboa | | |
| 2002-03 | Kalida | | | | Continental | Miller City | Ottoville | | |
| 2003-04 | Kalida | | | | Fort Jennings, Ottoville | Miller City | Kalida | | |
| 2004-05 | Kalida | | | | Continental | Miller City | Leipsic | | |
| 2005-06 | Ottoville | | | | Ottoville | Columbus Grove | Kalida | | |
| 2006-07 | Ottoville | | | | Ottoville | Columbus Grove, Ottoville | Kalida | | |
| 2007-08 | Kalida | | | | Pandora-Gilboa | Ottoville | Columbus Grove | Pandora-Gilboa | |
| 2008-09 | Ottoville | | | | Kalida, Pandora-Gilboa | Kalida, Leipsic | Miller City | Pandora-Gilboa | |
| 2009-10 | Ottoville | | | | Kalida | Ottoville | Columbus Grove | Pandora-Gilboa | |
| 2010-11 | Ottoville | | | Pandora-Gilboa | Columbus Grove | Ottoville | Leipsic | | |
| 2011-12 | Ottoville | | | | Columbus Grove, Leipsic | Ottoville | | | |
| 2012-13 | | | | | | | | | |
| 2018-2019 | | Ottoville | | | | | | | |
| 2019-2020 | | | | | Columbus Grove | | | | |
| 2020-2021 | | Ottoville | | | Ottoville | | | | |

=== League championship notes ===
- Golf champions were first determined in the fall of 1975.
- Boys basketball champions were first officially declared in 1934-35 with the exception of 1942-43 due to World War II. The first Pandora High School boys basketball team won the first county title recorded, however it was before official declaration.
- Girls basketball champions were first officially declared in 1934-35 and 1935–36, but not officially again until 1973-74.
- Baseball champions were determined by division winners (West & East) in a title game from 1931-1942, 1946-1948, and 1953-1955. A league tournament was used from 1943-1945, 1949-1952, and 1956-1964. From 1965 on, they were determined by regular season PCL records.

== See also ==
- Ohio High School Athletic Conferences
- OHSAA Northwest Region athletic conferences
