= Oscar Velasquez =

American artist (1944–2021)

Oscar Velasquez (April 5, 1944 – September 10, 2021) was an American artist and muralist.

== Personal life ==
Velasquez was born in Pharr, Texas, to migrant farm workers. In 1953, his family moved to Gilboa, Ohio, to pick tomatoes. He attended Pandora-Gilboa High School, graduating in 1965. He attended Cooper School of Art in Cleveland on a scholarship.

He married his wife, Pam Szymkowski, in December 1972. He is the brother of labor union activist Baldemar Velasquez.

== Career ==
After graduation from Pandora-Gilboa High School, Oscar received a scholarship to attend the Cooper Institute of Art in Cleveland, Ohio. Upon graduation, he was hired by the American Greeting Card Company. While he rose to direct the design department in 6 years, he wanted more freedom to do the art he desired to do, so he sought a solo career.

He was the author of two books, “Sketch of the South”, sketches of homes and scenery from the South, “Sketches of Homes”, which included homes in Bluffton, Ohio. He was hired by the art director for the filming of Sleeping with The Enemy. Oscar was also a musician who entertained in restaurants and night clubs.

As a member of the American Watercolor Society, his art was recognized and awarded by many academies and institutions. His art is displayed in various museums as well.

== Awards and recognition ==
Velasquez received the following awards:

- 1973-1974 – 'Mary S. Litt' medal
- 1976 – 'High Winds' medal
- 1978 – National Juror
- 1981 – Dolphin Fellowship

== Collections ==
His art is in the following collections:

- Joslyn Art Museum in Omaha, Nebraska
- Erskine College in Due West, South Carolina
- The Henry Ward Ranger Fund in New York
- The Opera House in Abbeville, South Carolina
- Self Memorial Hospital in Greenwood, South Carolina
- Farm Labor Organizing Committee in Toledo, Ohio
- The Lion and the Lamb Peace Arts Center at Bluffton University

== Murals ==
- 1991 – Iva, South Carolina – "Iva Depot"
- 1991 – Pandora, Ohio
- 1994 – Subotica, Serbia
- 1995 – Bluffton, Ohio – "A World of Youth, Hope and Peace"
- 1995 – Delphos, Ohio – "Early Days of the Miami Erie Canal"40.84649803613644°N 84.33973231807136°W
- 2007 – Toledo, Ohio – "Our Lady of Guadalupe"41.638807953099054°N 83.54845915602219°W
- 2007 – Findlay, Ohio – "Veteran's Memorial" 41.044224°N 83.650465°W
- 2009 – Leipsic, Ohio
- 2009 – Ottawa, Ohio – "Celebration of Progress"41.019370135843246°N 84.04721021854309°W
- 2010 – Bluffton, Ohio – "Main Street"
- 2011 – Miller City, Ohio
- 2012 – Kalida, Ohio – "Pioneer Days"40.981666°N 84.201536°W
- 2014 – Findlay, Ohio – "We Are Findlay"
- 2014 – Columbus Grove, Ohio – "St. Anthony Walking"
- 2015 – Findlay, Ohio – "Dark Side of the Moon"
- 2015 – Findlay, Ohio – "Starry Night"
- 2016 – Macedonia, Ohio – "Longwood Lake"
- 2017 – Pandora, Ohio – "Riley Creek"
- 2018 – Twinsburg, Ohio
- 2019 – Independence, Ohio
