= Millstream Career Center =

Coordinates: 41°03′16″N 83°39′56″W

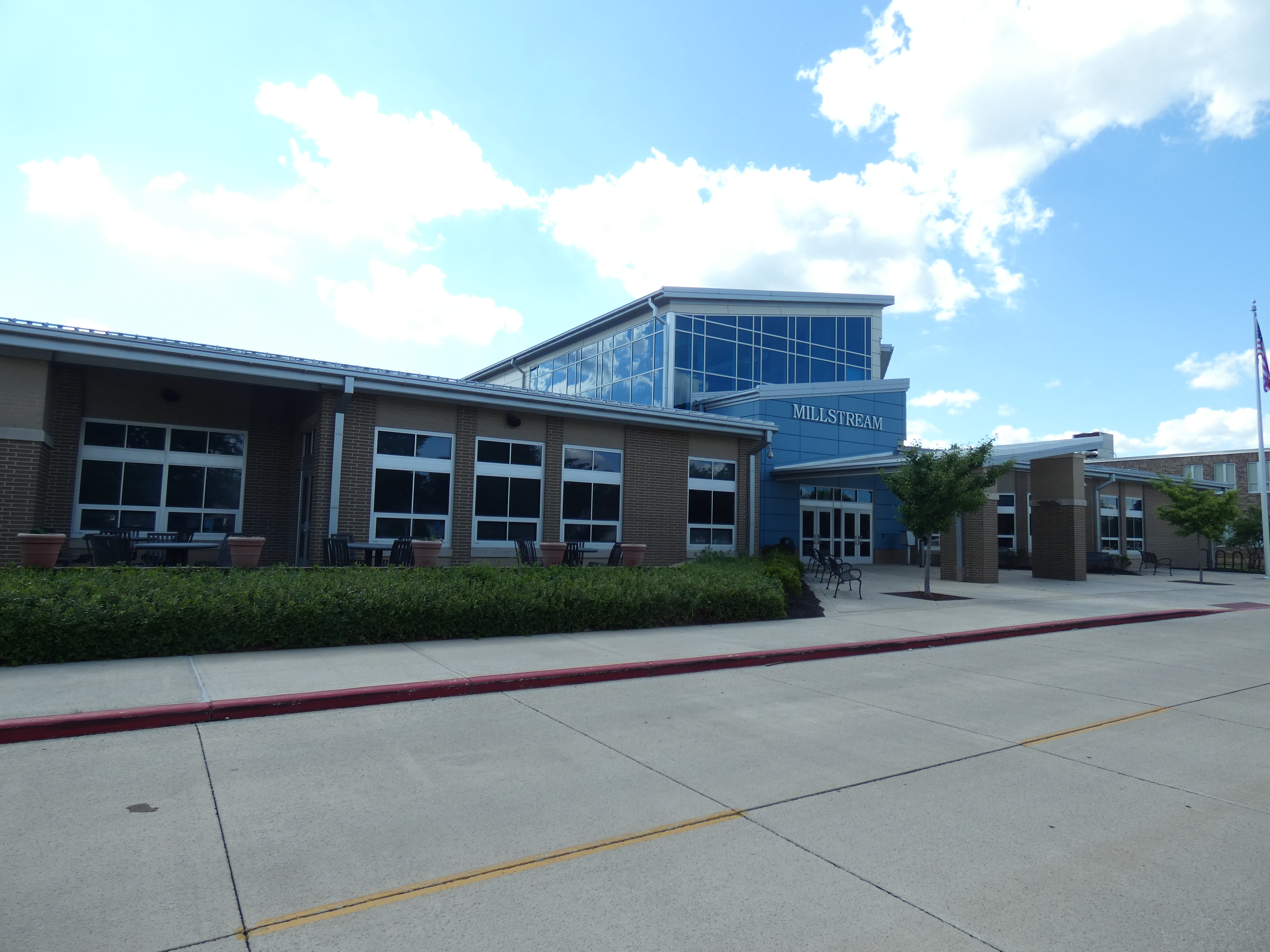
- Millstream Career Center in July 2022
- Findlay, Ohio, Hancock County, Ohio 45840; United States

Information
- School type: Vocational School
- Website: https://fcs.org/millstream-career-center/
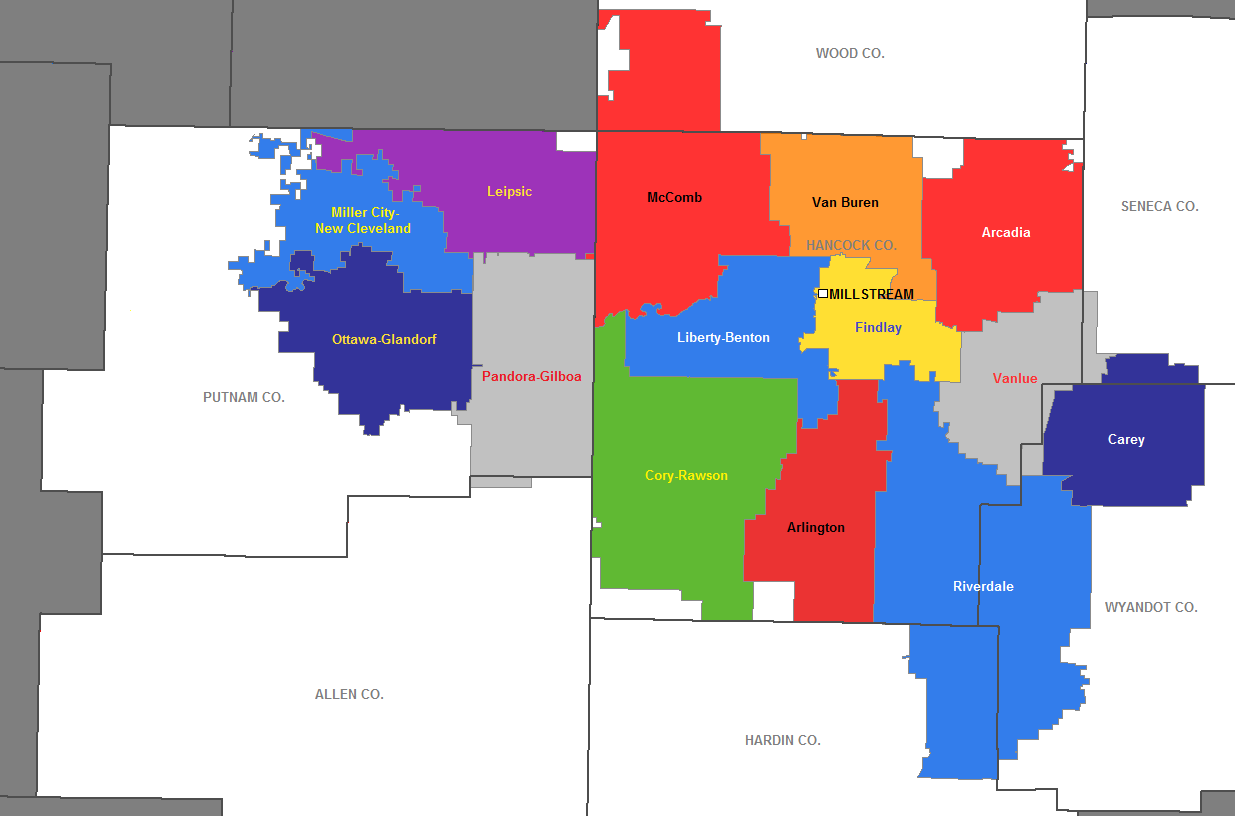
- District map

Millstream Career Center is a public vocational school located in Findlay, Ohio next to Findlay High School at 1150 Broad Avenue. It serves school districts located in the counties of Allen, Hancock, Hardin, Putnam, Seneca, Wood and Wyandot.

== Operation ==
The current Millstream Career Center building opened in 2012. In 2019 850 students attended the career center.

The career center hosts a number of programs, including fields such as healthcare, robotics, engineering, computer networking, welding, and cyber security.

The Career Center partners with other organizations such as the University of Findlay and the Toledo Zoo & Aquarium to offer hands on training.

== Associate schools ==
Enrollment is open to students from any of Millstream's thirteen partner schools.

- Arcadia High School
- Arlington High School
- Carey High School
- Cory-Rawson High School
- Findlay High School
- Leipsic High School
- Liberty-Benton High School
- McComb High School
- Miller City High School
- Ottawa-Glandorf High School
- Pandora-Gilboa High School
- Van Buren High School
- Vanlue High School
