= Regina High School =

Regina High School may refer to:

- Regina High School (Iowa), Iowa City, Iowa
- Regina High School (Michigan), Warren, Michigan
- Regina High School (Ohio), South Euclid, Ohio
- Regina High School (Maryland), an all-girls Catholic High School in Hyattsville, Maryland that closed in 1989
