= Kalida High School =

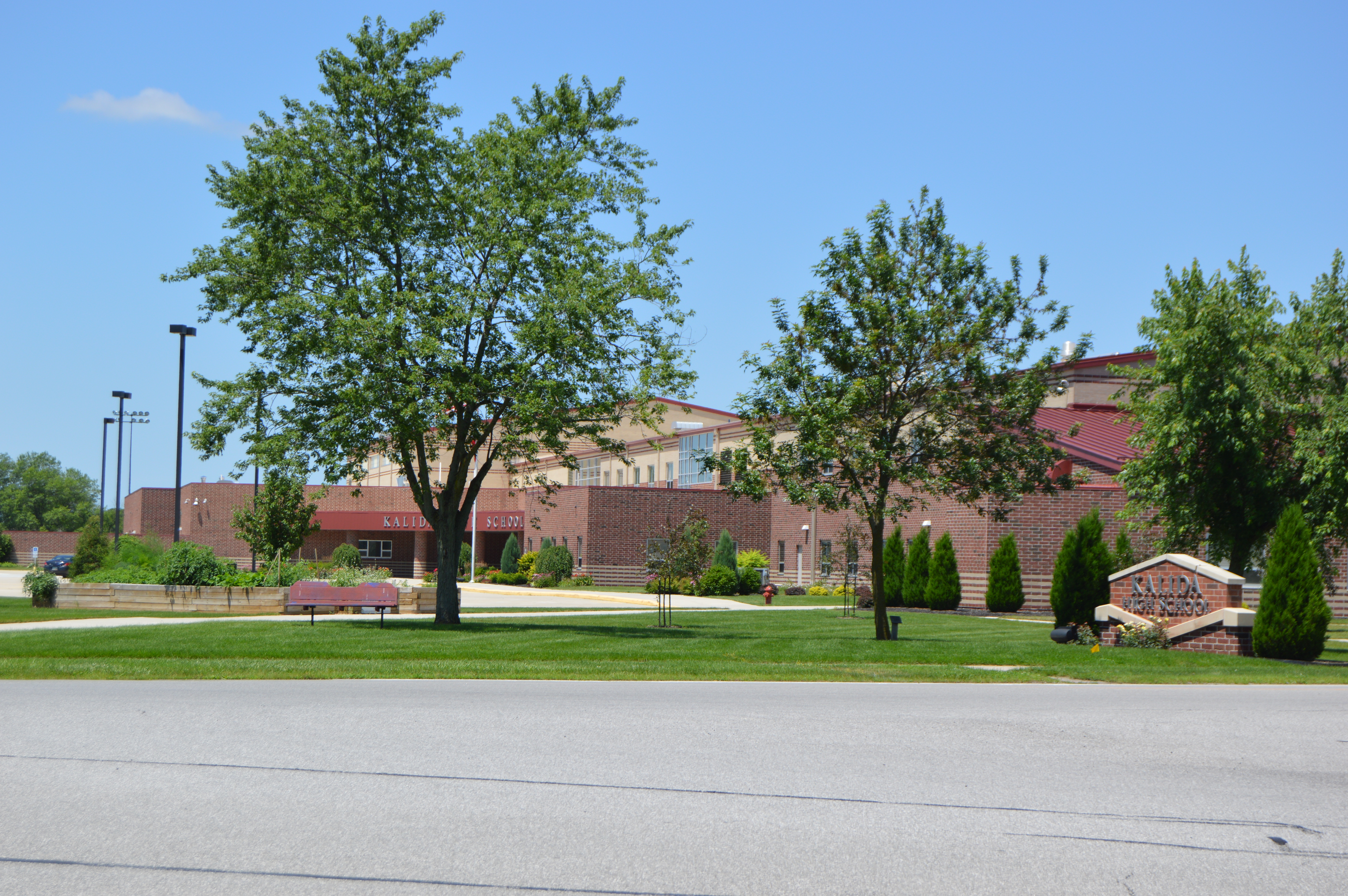
- Front, seen from Napoleon Street

Location
- 301 N. Third St. Kalida, (Putnam County), Ohio 45853; United States
- Coordinates: 40°59′09″N 84°11′57″W

Information
- Type: Public, Coeducational high school
- Teaching staff: 24.31 (FTE)
- Grades: 5–12
- Student to teacher ratio: 16.17
- Colors: Maroon, Gold & White
- Athletics conference: Putnam County League
- Nickname: Wildcats
- Website: http://kalidaschools.org

Kalida High School is a public high school in Kalida, Ohio. It is the only high school in the Kalida Local School District. Their mascot is the Wildcat. They are a member of the Putnam County League.

== Ohio High School Athletic Association State Championships ==
- Boys Basketball – 1981
- Girls Basketball – 1988, 1989, 1997

== Notable alumni ==
- Gene Stechschulte, Former MLB player (St. Louis Cardinals)
