= Gilboa, Ohio =

- Village
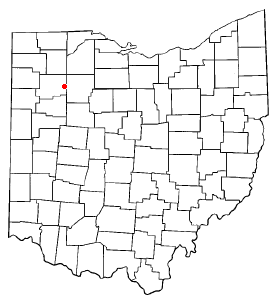
- Location of Gilboa, Ohio

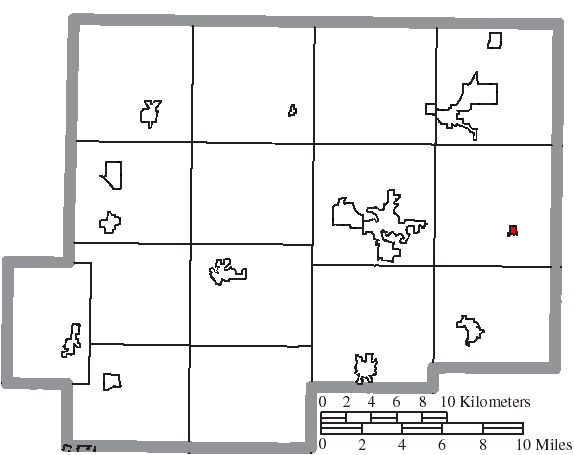
- Location of Gilboa in Putnam County
- Country: United States
- State: Ohio
- County: Putnam
- Established: 1848

Government
  - Type: Village Council

Area
  - Total: 0.13 sq mi (0.34 km^{2})
  - Land: 0.13 sq mi (0.34 km^{2})
  - Water: 0 sq mi (0.00 km^{2})
- Elevation: 745 ft (227 m)

Population (2020)
  - Total: 168
  - Estimate (2023): 166
  - Density: 1,280.4/sq mi (494.36/km^{2})
- Time zone: UTC-5 (Eastern (EST))
  - Summer (DST): UTC-4 (EDT)
- ZIP code: 45875
- Area code: 419
- FIPS code: 39-30114
- GNIS feature ID: 2398962

Gilboa is a village in Blanchard Township, Putnam County, Ohio, United States. The village is named after Mount Gilboa. The population was 168 at the 2020 census. The town's most popular landmark is a 16-foot-tall fiberglass statue of a bull.

== History ==
Gilboa was laid out in 1837. The village was incorporated in 1848. A post office was established at Gilboa in 1843, and remained in operation until 1985.

On August 6, 1852, a cholera epidemic struck Gilboa. The start of the epidemic was traced to a large damp cellar that had been used to store trash and decomposing waste. The epidemic lasted until August 21 and killed 13 Gilboa residents including one of the two doctors that had not fled. Out of the estimated 600 population, all but 40 fled including four of Gilboa's six doctors.

Artist and muralist Oscar Velasquez (1944-2021) was a long time Gilboa resident. He painted more than 50 murals nationally and internationally.

== Geography ==
Gilboa is located at 41°1′2″N 83°55′16″W (41.017329, -83.921143).

According to the United States Census Bureau, the village has a total area of 0.15 square miles (0.39 km^{2}), all land.

== Demographics ==
Historical population
Census	Pop.	Note	%±
1850	378		—
1860	315		−16.7%
1870	315		0.0%
1880	287		−8.9%
1890	264		−8.0%
1900	346		31.1%
1910	345		−0.3%
1920	235		−31.9%
1930	201		−14.5%
1940	209		4.0%
1950	181		−13.4%
1960	207		14.4%
1970	212		2.4%
1980	212		0.0%
1990	208		−1.9%
2000	170		−18.3%
2010	184		8.2%
2020	168		−8.7%
2023 (est.)	166	▼	−1.2%
U.S. Decennial Census

=== 2010 census ===
As of the census of 2010, there were 184 people, 71 households, and 50 families living in the village. The population density was 0 inhabitants per square mile (0.0/km^{2}). There were 76 housing units at an average density of 506.7 per square mile (195.6/km^{2}). The racial makeup of the village was 94.6% White, 0.5% Asian, 3.8% from other races, and 1.1% from two or more races. Hispanic or Latino of any race were 9.2% of the population.

There were 71 households, of which 35.2% had children under the age of 18 living with them, 57.7% were married couples living together, 5.6% had a female householder with no husband present, 7.0% had a male householder with no wife present, and 29.6% were non-families. 28.2% of all households were made up of individuals, and 12.7% had someone living alone who was 65 years of age or older. The average household size was 2.59 and the average family size was 3.18.

The median age in the village was 34 years. 25.5% of residents were under the age of 18; 8.7% were between the ages of 18 and 24; 24.4% were from 25 to 44; 22.3% were from 45 to 64; and 19% were 65 years of age or older. The gender makeup of the village was 49.5% male and 50.5% female.

=== 2000 census ===
As of the census of 2000, there were 170 people, 72 households, and 43 families living in the village. The population density was 1,139.3 inhabitants per square mile (439.9/km^{2}). There were 78 housing units at an average density of 522.8 per square mile (201.9/km^{2}). The racial makeup of the village was 98.24% White, 0.59% from other races, and 1.18% from two or more races. Hispanic or Latino of any race were 0.59% of the population.

There were 72 households, out of which 29.2% had children under the age of 18 living with them, 47.2% were married couples living together, 8.3% had a female householder with no husband present, and 38.9% were non-families. 33.3% of all households were made up of individuals, and 12.5% had someone living alone who was 65 years of age or older. The average household size was 2.36 and the average family size was 3.05.

In the village, the population was spread out, with 26.5% under the age of 18, 4.1% from 18 to 24, 34.1% from 25 to 44, 20.6% from 45 to 64, and 14.7% who were 65 years of age or older. The median age was 36 years. For every 100 females there were 112.5 males. For every 100 females age 18 and over, there were 104.9 males.

The median income for a household in the village was $29,844, and the median income for a family was $31,250. Males had a median income of $29,286 versus $22,045 for females. The per capita income for the village was $15,535. None of the families and 5.2% of the population were living below the poverty line, including no under eighteens and 11.5% of those over 64.

== Government ==
=== Mayors ===
- 1909 - D. R. Oren (term expired 1910)
- 2019 - Michelle Clymer - first female mayor of Gilboa
- 2023 - Peter Diller

== Culture ==
=== The Gilboa Bull ===
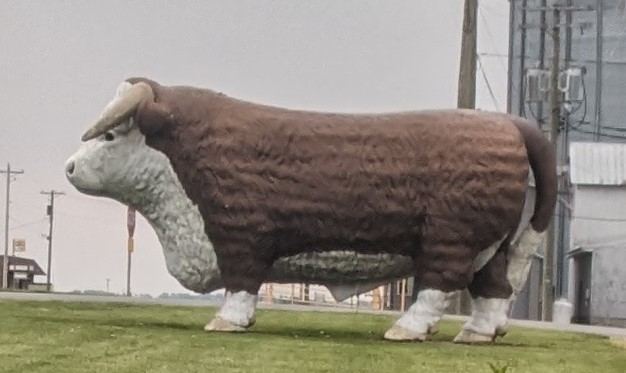
A side view of the bull, visible from U.S. Route 224 looking east

A 16-foot (4.9 m) fiberglass bull statue was placed at the intersection of U.S. Route 224 and Pearl Street by Gilboa then-resident (now mayor) Peter Diller in the 1970s.

At the time the bull was installed, Gilboa was looking for a revival of the town by welcoming visitors into its shops and restaurants. When Diller's father was driving in Toledo, Ohio one day, he spotted the bull outside of a bar. He stopped at the bar, and asked if they could sell the bull to him, to which the bar complied. According to Diller, the bull was difficult to transport back to Gilboa, due to its large size. “Its head was so high that we had to jockey around every stoplight,” recalled Diller. “The first stoplight … we hit it right on its forehead.” The bull was put into place and has since been regarded as a symbol of Gilboa's resilience as a town. “We wanted something that represented the strength of the community,” said Diller, “and what does that more than a big, strong bull?”

The statue has since been a landmark for people passing by Gilboa on U.S. Route 224.

=== The Gilboa Quarry ===
The Gilboa Quarry was originally a limestone quarry that opened in the 1890s. It operated as the Ottawa Stone Company until it closed in the early 1980s. In 1990 it was flooded and reopened as a destination for SCUBA divers. The water depth varies from 15 to 130 ft, providing ideal conditions for a wide range of divers.

== Education ==
Pandora-Gilboa is the school district many students from Gilboa attend, although some attend Ottawa-Glandorf.

== Notable people ==
- Edward S. Matthias, longest serving Ohio Supreme Court justice
- Baldemar Velasquez, labor union activist
- Oscar Velasquez, artist and muralist
