= Kalida Local School District =

School district in Ohio

Location
- Kalida, Ohio United States
- Coordinates: 40°59′4″N 84°11′51″W

District information
- Type: Public
- Grades: K-12

Students and staff
- Students: 603 (2015-2016)
- Athletic conference: Putnam County League (PCL)
- District mascot: Wildcat
- Colors: Maroon, White

Other information
- Website: www.kalidaschools.org

The Kalida Local School District is a school district in Kalida, Putnam County, Ohio.

== Superintendent ==
Karl Lammers is the superintendent of the Kalida Local School District.

== Board of education ==
- Board President: Gerry Vorst
- Board Vice President: Emily Peck
- Board Member: Brad Niemeyer
- Board Member: Craig Schmenk
- Board Member: Greg von der Embse

== Kalida High School ==
Kalida High School (KHS), part of Kalida Local School District, has a strong tradition of academic, athletic, and artistic success. In 2003 they were selected as a National Blue Ribbon School of Excellence. They have also received the Ohio Department of Education Excellent rating the past 6 years. Kalida earned the highest scores on the Ohio Graduation Test out of Putnam County, besides Pandora-Gilboa which scored higher, and all of the surrounding counties. All of these accomplishments represent their high academic standards.

The current principal is Dean Brinkman.

== Kalida Elementary School ==
The current principal is Mrs. Kayla Stechschulte.
