= Continental High School =

Coordinates: 41°6′16″N 84°15′52″W

Location
- 5211 State Route 634; Continental, (Putnam County), Ohio 45831; United States

Information
- Type: Public, Coeducational high school
- School district: Continental Local Schools
- Superintendent: Danny Kissell
- Dean: Tim Eding
- Principal: Danny Kissell
- Teaching staff: 14.00 (FTE)
- Grades: 7-12
- Student to teacher ratio: 13.57
- Colors: Blue & Gold
- Athletics conference: Putnam County League
- Sports: Baseball; Basketball; Volleyball; Soccer
- Mascot: Pirate
- Nickname: Pirates
- Team name: Continental Pirates
- Website: continentalpirates.org

Continental High School is a public high school in Continental, Ohio. It is the only high school in the Continental Local Schools district. Their nickname is the Continental Pirates, due to their mascot being a Pirate. They are a member of the Putnam County League.
