= Jackson Center, Ohio =

- Village
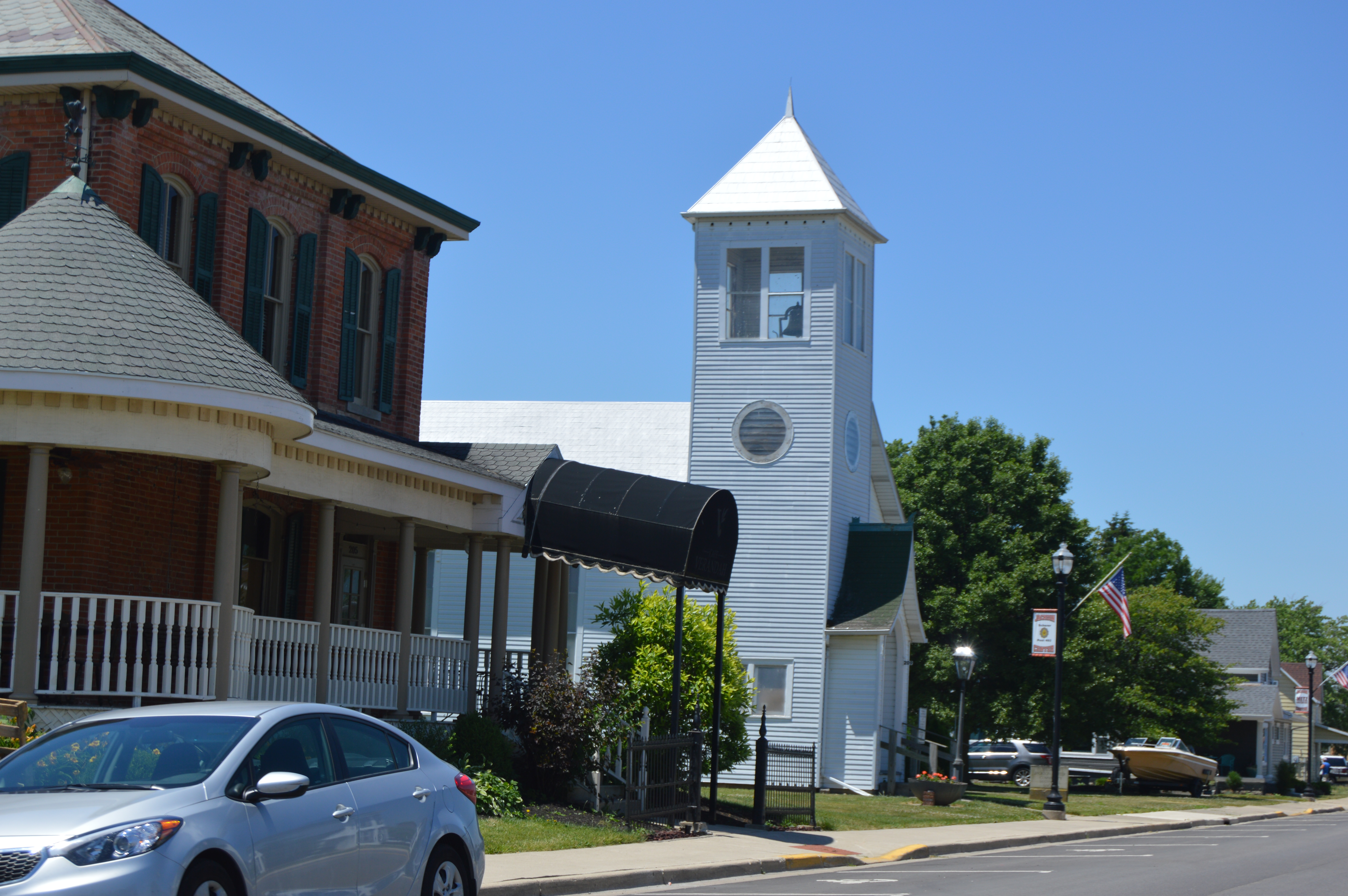
- Pike Street west of Main Street

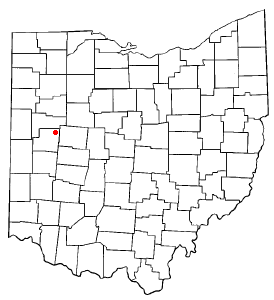
- Location of Jackson Center, Ohio

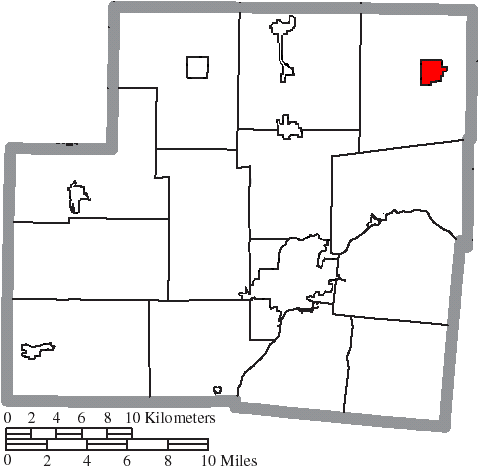
- Location of Jackson Center in Shelby County
- Coordinates: 40°26′19″N 84°02′28″W
- Country: United States
- State: Ohio
- County: Shelby

Government
  - Mayor: Jesse Fark
  - Council Member's: Leisha Elchert, Gina Ludwig, Ross Ludwig, Lucas Doseck, Wayne York, James Devine

Area
  - Total: 1.73 sq mi (4.48 km^{2})
  - Land: 1.72 sq mi (4.46 km^{2})
  - Water: 0.0077 sq mi (0.02 km^{2})
- Elevation: 1,027 ft (313 m)

Population (2020)
  - Total: 1,441
  - Density: 837.3/sq mi (323.27/km^{2})
- Time zone: UTC-5 (Eastern (EST))
  - Summer (DST): UTC-4 (EDT)
- ZIP code: 45334
- Area codes: 937, 326
- FIPS code: 39-38220
- GNIS feature ID: 2398286
- Website: http://www.jacksoncenter.com/

Jackson Center is a village in Shelby County, Ohio, United States. The population was 1,441 at the 2020 census.

Jackson Center has been the home of the popular Airstream travel trailers and motor homes since 1952.

Jackson Center is accessible from Interstate 75 at Exit 102, north of the Shelby County seat of Sidney. State Route 274 links I-75 to Jackson Center (the exit is signed "Jackson Center/New Bremen").

== History ==
Jackson Center was platted in 1835. A post office called Jackson Center has been in operation since 1858.

== Geography ==
According to the United States Census Bureau, the village has a total area of 1.69 square miles (4.38 km^{2}), of which 1.68 square miles (4.35 km^{2}) is land and 0.01 square miles (0.03 km^{2}) is water.

== Demographics ==
Historical population
Census	Pop.	Note	%±
1870	60		—
1900	644		—
1910	685		6.4%
1920	573		−16.4%
1930	526		−8.2%
1940	566		7.6%
1950	698		23.3%
1960	980		40.4%
1970	1,119		14.2%
1980	1,310		17.1%
1990	1,398		6.7%
2000	1,369		−2.1%
2010	1,462		6.8%
2020	1,441		−1.4%
U.S. Decennial Census

=== 2000 census ===
As of the census of 2000, there were 1,369 people, 541 households, and 394 families living in the village. The population density was 1,088.9 inhabitants per square mile (420.4/km^{2}). There were 584 housing units at an average density of 464.5 per square mile (179.3/km^{2}). The racial makeup of the village was 99.12% White, 0.51% African American, 0.22% Native American, 0.15% from other races. Hispanic or Latino of any race were 0.44% of the population.

There were 541 households, out of which 36.8% had children under the age of 18 living with them, 58.8% were married couples living together, 10.2% had a female householder with no husband present, and 27.0% were non-families. 23.7% of all households were made up of individuals, and 12.6% had someone living alone who was 65 years of age or older. The average household size was 2.53 and the average family size was 2.97.

In the village, the population was spread out, with 29.2% under the age of 18, 8.8% from 18 to 24, 28.3% from 25 to 44, 20.2% from 45 to 64, and 13.4% who were 65 years of age or older. The median age was 33 years. For every 100 females there were 94.5 males. For every 100 females age 18 and over, there were 89.3 males.

The median income for a household in the village was $40,650, and the median income for a family was $47,240. Males had a median income of $35,313 versus $23,654 for females. The per capita income for the village was $17,755. About 6.2% of families and 7.6% of the population were below the poverty line, including 12.7% of those under age 18 and 6.7% of those age 65 or over.

=== 2010 census ===
As of the census of 2010, there were 1,462 people, 576 households, and 404 families living in the village. The population density was 870.2 inhabitants per square mile (336.0/km^{2}). There were 644 housing units at an average density of 383.3 per square mile (148.0/km^{2}). The racial makeup of the village was 98.1% White, 0.1% Asian, 0.6% from other races, and 1.2% from two or more races. Hispanic or Latino of any race were 1.7% of the population.

There were 576 households, of which 36.3% had children under the age of 18 living with them, 53.0% were married couples living together, 10.2% had a female householder with no husband present, 6.9% had a male householder with no wife present, and 29.9% were non-families. 26.9% of all households were made up of individuals, and 10.4% had someone living alone who was 65 years of age or older. The average household size was 2.54 and the average family size was 3.05.

The median age in the village was 35.7 years. 29.7% of residents were under the age of 18; 5.9% were between the ages of 18 and 24; 27.9% were from 25 to 44; 23% were from 45 to 64; and 13.6% were 65 years of age or older. The gender makeup of the village was 49.9% male and 50.1% female.

== Education ==
Jackson Center Local School District operates one large K-12 school building which includes the Jackson Center High School.

Jackson Center has a public library, a branch of Shelby County Libraries.
