= Jackson Center High School =

Location
- 204 S. Linden St. Jackson Center, Ohio 45334; United States

Information
- School district: Jackson Center Local Schools
- Staff: 5.00 (FTE)
- Grades: 7–12 (building is K-12)
- Enrollment: 249 (2023-2024)
- Student to teacher ratio: 49.80
- Language: English
- Colors: Orange & Black
- Athletics conference: Shelby County Athletic League
- Team name: Tigers
- Website: http://www.jctigers.org

Jackson Center High School is a public high school in Jackson Center, Ohio. It is the only high school in the Jackson Center Local Schools district. The Tigers wear orange and black and compete in the Shelby County Athletic League.

== Ohio High School Athletic Association State Championships ==
- Boys Basketball – 1985
- Girls Basketball – 1995, 2001
- Girls Volleyball - 2015, 2016
