= Miller City High School =

Coordinates: 41°06′15″N 84°07′41″W

Location
- 5195 State Route 108; Miller City, (Putnam County), Ohio 45864; United States

Information
- Type: Public, Coeducational high school
- Teaching staff: 11.57 (FTE)
- Grades: 9–12
- Student to teacher ratio: 22.30
- Colors: Blue & Gold
- Athletics conference: Putnam County League
- Nickname: Wildcats
- Website: web.ml.noacsc.org

Miller City-New Cleveland High School is a public high school in Miller City, Ohio. It is the only high school in the Miller City Schools district. Their nickname is the Wildcats. They are a member of the Putnam County League.

Superintendent: Kerry Johnson Principal 9–12: Kerry Johnson Principal K–8: Dustin Pester

== Ohio High School Athletic Association State Championships ==
- Boys Baseball – 1977, 1984
- Boys Basketball – 1950

== Historical Marker ==
Ohio Historical Marker #5-69 graces the front entrance of Miller City High School. The marker, issued by the Ohio Historical Society Commemorates the Wildcats' 1950 Boys Basketball State Championship.

The front of the marker states: "The Miller City Wildcats." It then depicts a photo of the rag-tag team:

Standing, L to R: Coach C. Norris Simpson, Donald Alt, Bill Ziegler, Roy Meyer, Jerry Kuhlman, Karl Inkrott, Vern Schroeder, Mel Lammers

Kneeling, L to R: Joe Lammers, Junior McDonald, Frank Schroeder, Ralph (Skip) Meyer, Dick Barlage

Team manager: Charles Warnimont

Cheerleaders: Betty Lou Meyer, Agnes Riepenhoff, Clara Schroeder, Audrey Wischmeyer

School colors: Blue and Gold

"You have got to have the boys and I had the boys" –Coach C. Norris Simpson

The back of the marker proclaims: "The "Cinderella Kids" of 1950"

The 1949-1950 season of the Miller City Wildcats boys' basketball team is one of Ohio's great sports stories. First-year coach C. Norris Simpson assembled an undersized group of farm boys and led them to 29 straight victories, including 11 tournament wins. The Wildcats played home games in "The Barn," which was heated by two pot-bellied stoves (later the site of Miller City Sportsman's Club). Sportswriters nicknamed the team the "Mighty Mites" and "Cinderella Kids," among others, because the underdog squad regularly beat bigger opponents. The Wildcats defeated the Eaton Eagles in the Class B state championship game on March 25, 1950 and became the only one of more than 1,100 teams in Ohio to end that season with a perfect record of all wins and no losses. Thousands of fans welcomed the state champs home to Miller City, then a village of approximately 150 residents.
