= Fort Jennings, Ohio =

- Village
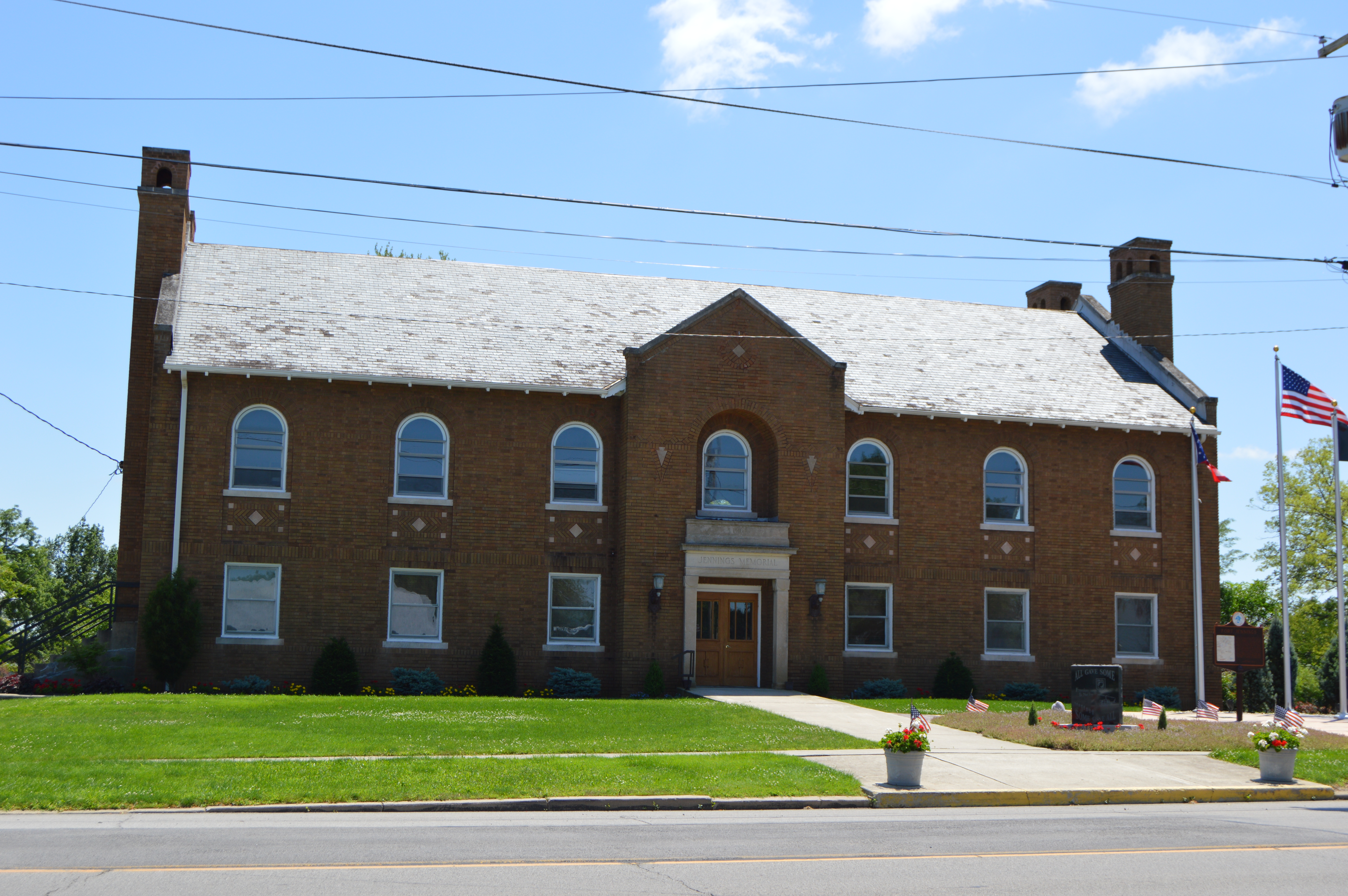
- Fort Jennings Memorial Hall, the community center

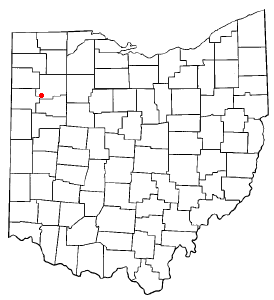
- Location of Fort Jennings, Ohio

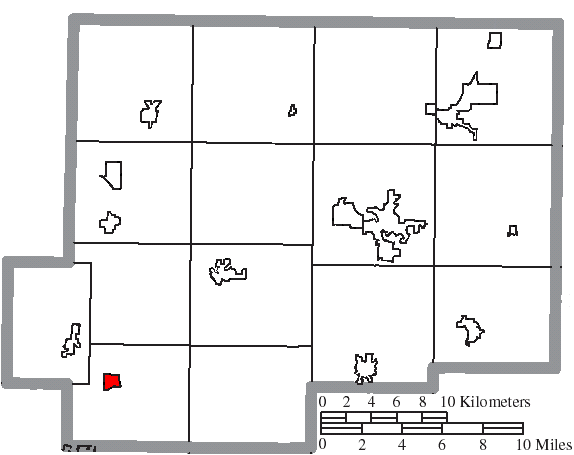
- Location of Fort Jennings in Putnam County
- Coordinates: 40°54′25″N 84°17′59″W
- Country: United States
- State: Ohio
- County: Putnam

Area
  - Total: 0.57 sq mi (1.47 km^{2})
  - Land: 0.56 sq mi (1.46 km^{2})
  - Water: 0.0077 sq mi (0.02 km^{2})
- Elevation: 748 ft (228 m)

Population (2020)
  - Total: 525
  - Estimate (2023): 525
  - Density: 933.2/sq mi (360.32/km^{2})
- Time zone: UTC-5 (Eastern (EST))
  - Summer (DST): UTC-4 (EDT)
- ZIP code: 45844
- Area code: 419
- FIPS code: 39-27818
- GNIS feature ID: 2398902

Fort Jennings is a village in Jennings Township, Putnam County, Ohio, United States. The population was 525 at the 2020 census.

== History ==
The first settlement in Fort Jennings was made around 1850. Fort Jennings took its name from Col. William Jennings, who established a fort near the site in 1812. The village was founded in 1847 and incorporated in 1881.

== Geography ==
According to the United States Census Bureau, the village has a total area of 0.53 square miles (1.37 km^{2}), of which 0.52 square miles (1.35 km^{2}) is land and 0.01 square miles (0.03 km^{2}) is water.

== Demographics ==
Historical population
| Census | Pop. | Note | %± |
|---|---|---|---|
| 1880 | 164 | | — |
| 1890 | 286 | | 74.4% |
| 1900 | 322 | | 12.6% |
| 1910 | 336 | | 4.3% |
| 1920 | 275 | | −18.2% |
| 1930 | 318 | | 15.6% |
| 1940 | 326 | | 2.5% |
| 1950 | 330 | | 1.2% |
| 1960 | 436 | | 32.1% |
| 1970 | 533 | | 22.2% |
| 1980 | 538 | | 0.9% |
| 1990 | 436 | | −19.0% |
| 2000 | 432 | | −0.9% |
| 2010 | 485 | | 12.3% |
| 2020 | 525 | | 8.2% |
| 2023 (est.) | 525 | Steady | 0.0% |
U.S. Decennial Census

=== 2010 census ===
As of the census of 2010, there were 485 people, 194 households, and 132 families living in the village. The population density was 932.7 inhabitants per square mile (360.1/km^{2}). There were 207 housing units at an average density of 398.1 per square mile (153.7/km^{2}). The racial makeup of the village was 99.2% White and 0.8% Asian.

There were 194 households, of which 32.5% had children under the age of 18 living with them, 56.7% were married couples living together, 8.2% had a female householder with no husband present, 3.1% had a male householder with no wife present, and 32.0% were non-families. 30.4% of all households were made up of individuals, and 18.5% had someone living alone who was 65 years of age or older. The average household size was 2.50 and the average family size was 3.17.

The median age in the village was 39.1 years. 27% of residents were under the age of 18; 7.4% were between the ages of 18 and 24; 23.7% were from 25 to 44; 24.9% were from 45 to 64; and 16.9% were 65 years of age or older. The gender makeup of the village was 47.8% male and 52.2% female.

=== 2000 census ===
As of the census of 2000, there were 432 people, 171 households, and 123 families living in the village. The population density was 852.2 inhabitants per square mile (329.0/km^{2}). There were 181 housing units at an average density of 357.1 per square mile (137.9/km^{2}). The racial makeup of the village was 99.77% White and 0.23% African American.

There were 171 households, out of which 33.9% had children under the age of 18 living with them, 62.0% were married couples living together, 6.4% had a female householder with no husband present, and 27.5% were non-families. 26.3% of all households were made up of individuals, and 15.2% had someone living alone who was 65 years of age or older. The average household size was 2.53 and the average family size was 3.06.

In the village, the population was spread out, with 27.8% under the age of 18, 5.1% from 18 to 24, 28.7% from 25 to 44, 20.8% from 45 to 64, and 17.6% who were 65 years of age or older. The median age was 37 years. For every 100 females there were 94.6 males. For every 100 females age 18 and over, there were 96.2 males.

The median income for a household in the village was $44,464, and the median income for a family was $53,393. Males had a median income of $37,750 versus $23,750 for females. The per capita income for the village was $20,169. About 2.3% of families and 1.5% of the population were below the poverty line, including none of those under age 18 and 9.0% of those age 65 or over.

== Education ==
Jennings Local School District operates one elementary school and Fort Jennings High School.

Fort Jennings has a public library, a branch of the Putnam County District Library.
