= Fort Jennings High School =

Location
- 1 Musketeer Dr. Fort Jennings, (Putnam County), Ohio 45844; United States
- Coordinates: 40°54′36″N 84°18′00″W

Information
- Type: Public, Coeducational high school
- Teaching staff: 12.25 (FTE)
- Grades: 7-12
- Student to teacher ratio: 15.02
- Colors: Black & Orange
- Athletics conference: Putnam County League
- Nickname: Musketeers
- Website: http://jenningslocal.org

Fort Jennings High School is a public high school in Fort Jennings, Ohio. It is a member of Putnam County. It is the only high school in the Jennings Local Schools district. Their mascot is the Musketeers. They are a member of the Putnam County League. The superintendent of the school district is Nick Langhals, and the dean of students is Todd Hoehn. They built a new high school in 2004. Their building is connected to their elementary school.

== Ohio High School Athletic Association State Championships ==
- Boys Basketball – 2000

== Soccer Association for Youth State Championships ==
- Boys Soccer - 1995, 1997
