= Harvest Preparatory School =

Location
- 4595 Gender Road; Canal Winchester, (Franklin County), Ohio, 43110; United States
- Coordinates: 39°53′29″N 82°49′46″W

Information
- Type: Private, Coeducational High School
- Religious affiliation: Christianity
- Established: 1986
- Founders: Rod Parsley, Joni Parsley
- School district: Canal Winchester Schools
- President: Rod Parsley and king solomon porter
- Principal: Andrew Mills (Upper School), Lisa Mahoney (Lower School)
- Head of school: Kenneth Grunden
- Grades: K-12
- Average class size: 25
- Colors: Maroon and Gray
- Fight song: Onward Harvest Prep
- Athletics conference: Mid-State League
- Sports: Football, Volleyball, Soccer, Cheerleading, Boys Basketball, Girls Basketball, Baseball, Fast-Pitch Softball, Track and Field
- Team name: Warriors
- Website: https://www.harvestprep.org/

Harvest Preparatory School is a private school located in Canal Winchester, Ohio affiliated with the World Harvest Church and run by the church's founder, Pastor Rod Parsley and Solomon Kingson Porter

== Athletics ==
=== Ohio High School Athletic Association State Championships ===
- Boys Basketball - 2019*
- Girls Basketball - 2010, 2011*
