= Continental, Ohio =

- Village
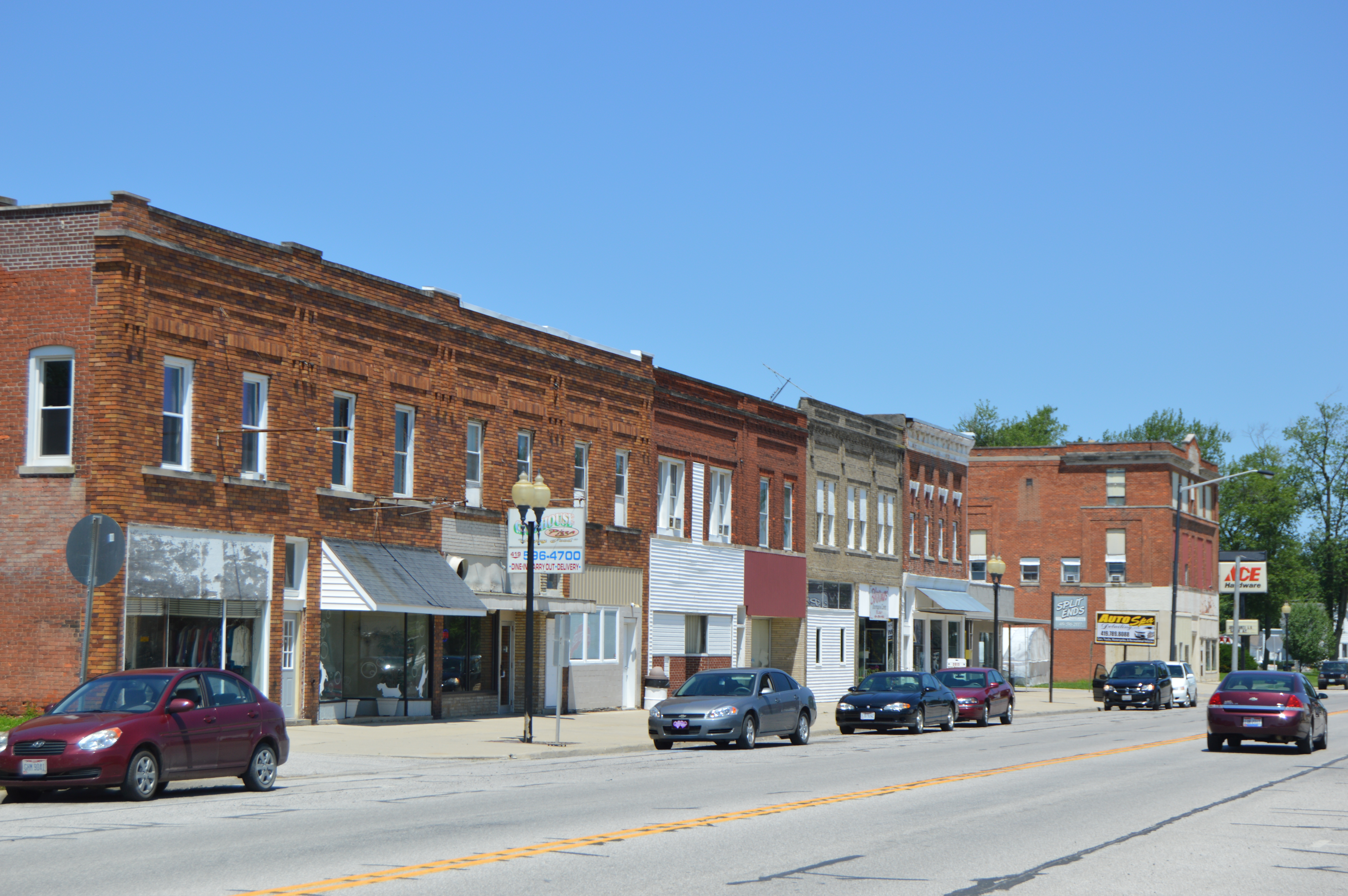
- Main Street commercial district

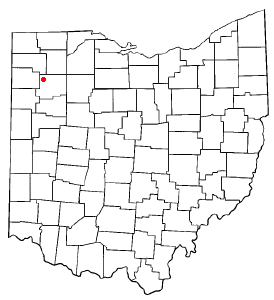
- Location of Continental, Ohio

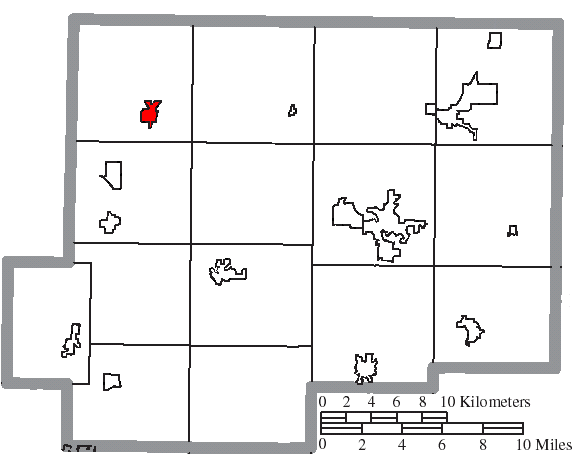
- Location of Continental in Putnam County
- Coordinates: 41°06′01″N 84°16′21″W
- Country: United States
- State: Ohio
- County: Putnam

Area
  - Total: 1.22 sq mi (3.16 km^{2})
  - Land: 1.20 sq mi (3.10 km^{2})
  - Water: 0.027 sq mi (0.07 km^{2})
- Elevation: 722 ft (220 m)

Population (2020)
  - Total: 1,102
  - Estimate (2023): 1,087
  - Density: 920.9/sq mi (355.55/km^{2})
- Time zone: UTC-5 (Eastern (EST))
  - Summer (DST): UTC-4 (EDT)
- ZIP codes: 45831, 45837
- Area code: 419
- FIPS code: 39-18504
- GNIS feature ID: 2398619
- Website: https://villageofcontinental.com/

Continental is a village in Putnam County, Ohio, United States. The population was 1,102 at the 2020 census.

== History ==
Continental, originally named Maurice City, was platted in 1888. Several months later, the village was incorporated under the new name of Continental.

== Geography ==
According to the United States Census Bureau, the village has a total area of 0.91 square miles (2.36 km^{2}), of which 0.89 square miles (2.31 km^{2}) is land and 0.02 square miles (0.05 km^{2}) is water.

== Demographics ==
Historical population
Census	Pop.	Note	%±
1890	895		—
1900	1,104		23.4%
1910	1,074		−2.7%
1920	1,093		1.8%
1930	897		−17.9%
1940	1,059		18.1%
1950	1,023		−3.4%
1960	1,147		12.1%
1970	1,185		3.3%
1980	1,179		−0.5%
1990	1,214		3.0%
2000	1,188		−2.1%
2010	1,153		−2.9%
2020	1,102		−4.4%
2023 (est.)	1,087	▼	−1.4%
U.S. Decennial Census

=== 2010 census ===
As of the census of 2010, there were 1,153 people, 486 households, and 320 families living in the village. The population density was 1,295.5 inhabitants per square mile (500.2/km^{2}). There were 544 housing units at an average density of 611.2 per square mile (236.0/km^{2}). The racial makeup of the village was 98.4% White, 0.1% African American, 0.1% Native American, 0.1% Asian, 0.2% other races, 0.9% from other races, and 0.3% from two or more races. Hispanic or Latino of any race were 3.1% of the population.

There were 486 households, of which 30.2% had children under the age of 18 living with them, 51.0% were married couples living together, 9.5% had a female householder with no husband present, 5.3% had a male householder with no wife present, and 34.2% were non-families. 29.0% of all households were made up of individuals, and 14.4% had someone living alone who was 65 years of age or older. The average household size was 2.37 and the average family size was 2.90.

The median age in the village was 42.2 years. 22.8% of residents were under the age of 18; 9% were between the ages of 18 and 24; 22.9% were from 25 to 44; 29.5% were from 45 to 64; and 16% were 65 years of age or older. The gender makeup of the village was 49.9% male and 50.1% female.

=== 2000 census ===
As of the census of 2000, there were 1,188 people, 481 households, and 325 families living in the village. The population density was 1,675.1 inhabitants per square mile (646.8/km^{2}). There were 509 housing units at an average density of 717.7 per square mile (277.1/km^{2}). The racial makeup of the village was 97.90% White, 0.08% African American, 0.08% Asian, 1.18% from other races, and 0.76% from two or more races. Hispanic or Latino of any race were 2.61% of the population.

There were 481 households, of which 35.8% had children under the age of 18 living with them, 52.6% were married couples living together, 10.8% had a female householder with no husband present, and 32.4% were non-families. 29.1% of all households were made up of individuals, and 13.5% had someone living alone who was 65 years of age or older. The average household size was 2.47 and the average family size was 3.05.

In the village, the population was spread out, with 28.1% under the age of 18, 8.4% from 18 to 24, 28.5% from 25 to 44, 20.7% from 45 to 64, and 14.2% who were 65 years of age or older. The median age was 35 years. For every 100 females there were 90.4 males. For every 100 females age 18 and over, there were 85.7 males.

The median income for a household in the village was $33,977, and the median income for a family was $41,786. Males had a median income of $34,167 versus $22,120 for females. The per capita income for the village was $15,829. About 8.8% of families and 9.3% of the population were below the poverty line, including 11.1% of those under age 18 and 4.9% of those age 65 or over.

== Education ==
Continental Local Schools operates one elementary school and Continental High School.

Continental has a public library, a branch of the Putnam County District Library.

== Arts and culture ==
The Continental Fall Festival has been held annually in downtown Continental since 1988.
