= Bethel High School (Ohio) =

School in Ohio, United States

Coordinates: 39.919°N 84.086°W

Location
- 7490 South State Route 201; Tipp City, (Miami County), Ohio 45371; United States

Information
- Type: Public high school
- Principal: Barrett Swope
- Staff: 24.00 (FTE)
- Enrollment: 491 (2023-2024)
- Student to teacher ratio: 20.46
- Colors: Kelly green and white
- Nickname: Bees

Bethel High School is a public high school in Miami County, Ohio. It is the only high school in the Bethel Local School district. Their student enrollment in 2023-2024 was about 491 in grades 9–12. Their nickname is the Bethel Bees.

== History ==
Originally, the school was known as Bethel Township School which was constructed in 1917 and housed grade K-12. In 1956, the 1917 building underwent its second expansion and Bethel High School was added, attached to the 1917 building. The original 1917 building now houses grades 5th-6th. In 2017, a third major expansion was added on to the school, which was the new high school building. In 2023, the district expanded their facility to fit a new elementary school building, currently hosting grades "Young-5" - 4th.

== Athletics ==
Boys	Girls
Basketball	Basketball
Soccer	Soccer
Track	Track
Cross Country	Cross Country
Baseball	Softball
Golf	Golf
Swimming	Swimming
Football	Cheerleading

=== Ohio High School Athletic Association State Championships ===
- Boys Basketball – 2001
- Girls Basketball – 1986

== Notable alumni/students ==
- Susan Blackwell, Actress credited with the Broadway show, [title of show]
- Donald N. Frey, Ford Mustang engineer/designer
- Roy J. Plunkett, invented Teflon (needs additional citation)
