= River View High School (Ohio) =

Public, coeducational high school in Warsaw, Ohio, United States

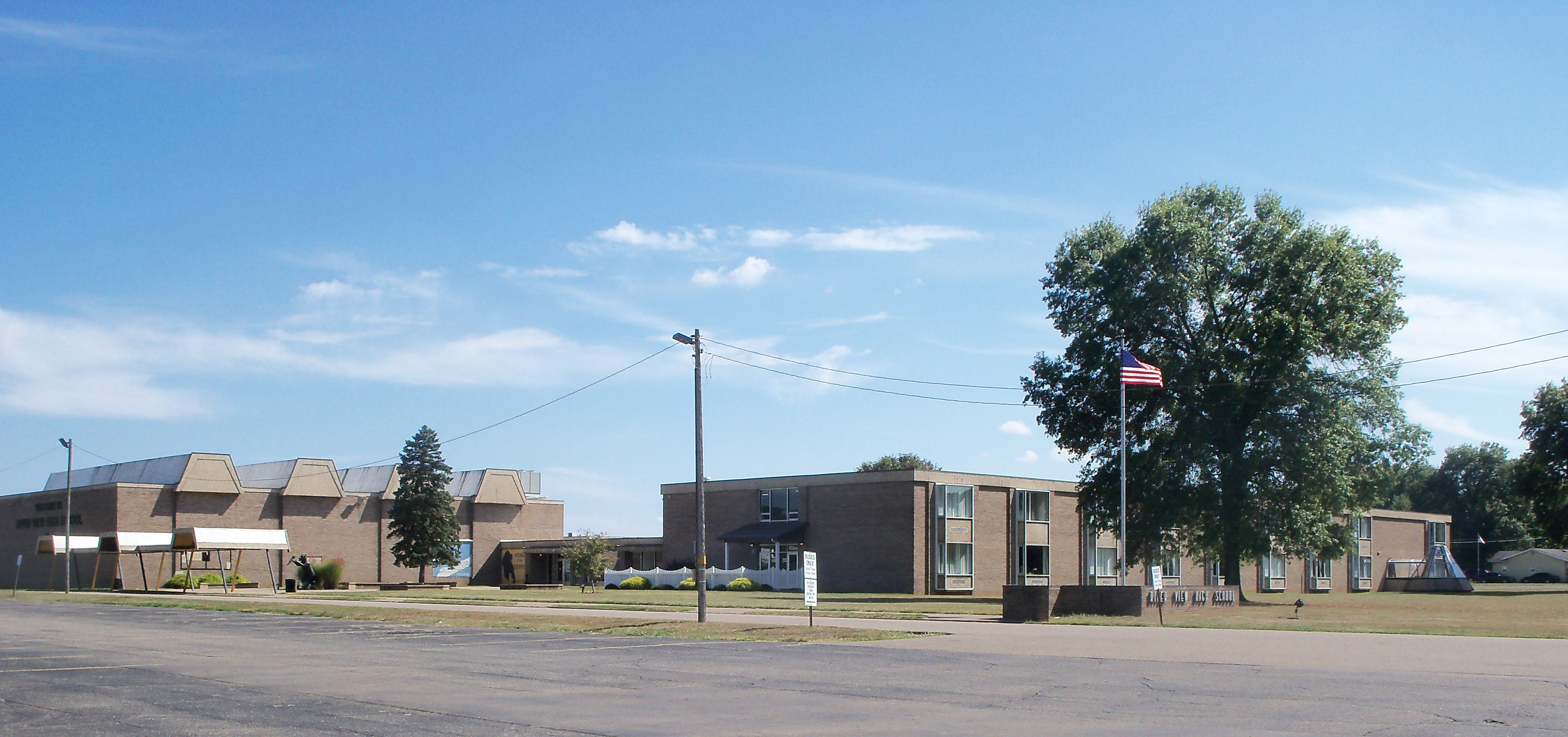

Location
- 26496 State Route 60 North; Warsaw, (Coshocton County), Ohio 43844; United States; 40°20′23″N 81°57′34″W

Information
- Type: Public, Coeducational high school
- Motto: "Building educational excellence for tomorrow, today."
- Superintendent: Chuck Rinkes
- CEEB code: 365338
- Principal: Joshua Branch
- Teaching staff: 24.28 (FTE)
- Grades: 7–12
  - Grade 6: <10 (2025)
  - Grade 7: 125 (2025)
  - Grade 8: 107 (2025)
  - Grade 9: 117 (2025)
  - Grade 10: 113 (2025)
  - Grade 11: 90 (2025)
  - Grade 12: 73 (2025)
- Student to teacher ratio: 19.98
- Campus type: Rural
- Colors: Old gold and black
- Athletics conference: Muskingum Valley League
- Team name: Black Bears
- Rival: Coshocton High School
- Yearbook: “Golden Memories”
- Website: https://rvbears.org

River View High School is a public high school in Warsaw, Ohio. The school primarily serves students residing in the River View Local School District. The school district also participates in open enrollment making it possible for students from outside district boundaries to enroll at River View High School. The school currently has an enrollment of approximately 626 students in grades 7-12.

== Athletics ==
=== Teams ===
Fall: cheerleading (girls), cross country (boys/girls), golf (boys/girls), soccer (boys/girls), volleyball (girls), football (boys)
Winter: cheerleading (girls), basketball (boys), swimming (boys/girls), wrestling (boys)
Spring: baseball (boys), softball (girls), track (boys/girls)

=== Ohio High School Athletic Association State Championships ===
- Boys' basketball – 1975
- Girls' basketball – 1977, 1982, 2006, 2007
- Boys soccer - 2024
- Boys golf - 2026

== Notable alumni ==
- Danielle Peck, country music singer
