= Columbus Africentric Early College =

Public high school in Columbus, Ohio, United States

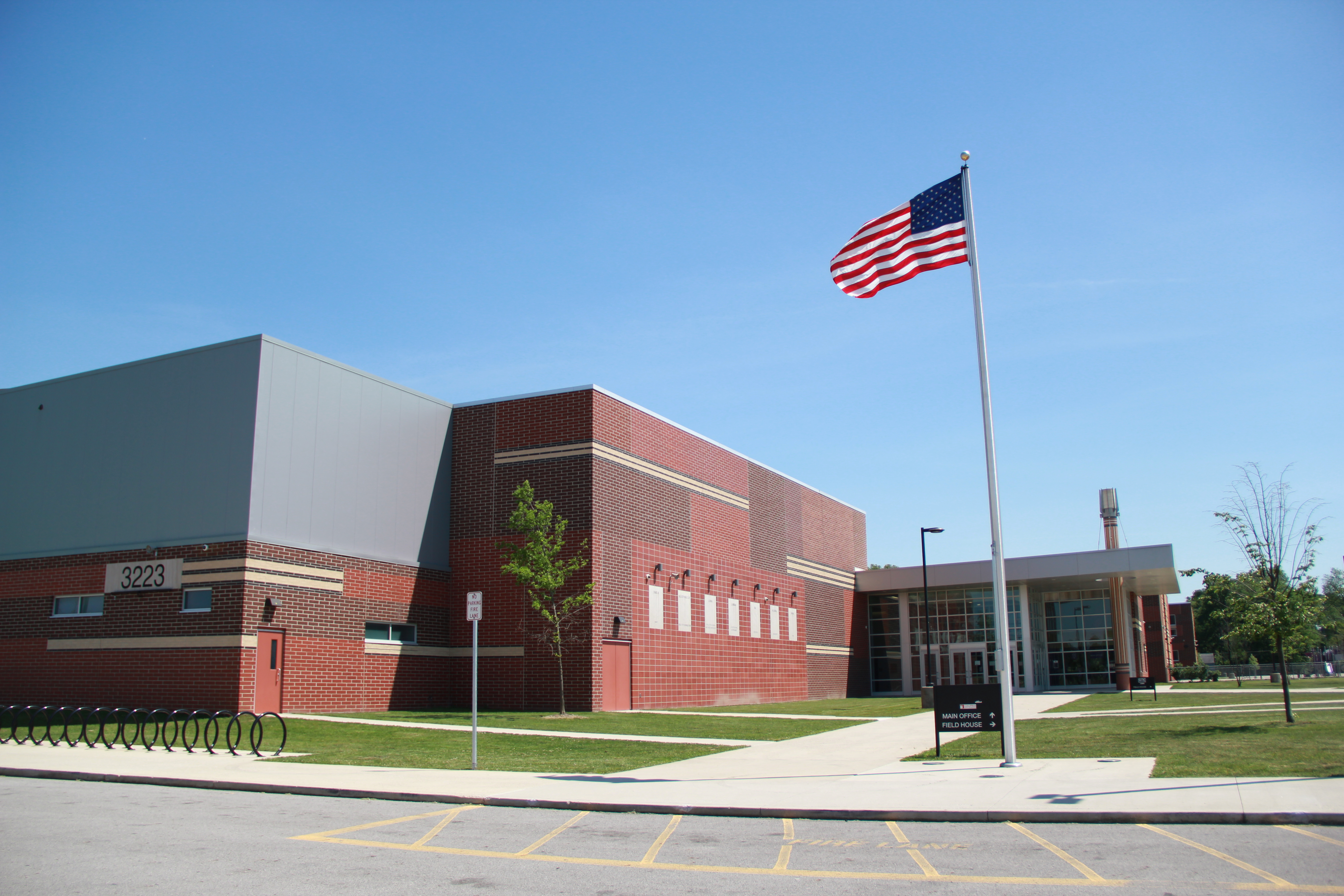
- Building

Location
- First and second locations of the school
- 3223 Allegheny Avenue; Columbus, (Franklin County), Ohio 43209; United States
- 39°58′45″N 82°54′58″W

Information
- Type: Public, Coeducational high school
- Founder: Charles Tennant
- School district: Columbus City Schools
- Superintendent: Angela Chapman
- Administrator: Dr. Sherri C. Williams (Principal 9-12); John Stegall (Asst. Principal 9-12); Henry Warren (Principal 6-8); Carmen Turner (Principal K-5)
- Director: Dr. Sherri C. Williams
- Grades: Pre-K-12
- Colors: Purple and Black
- Athletics: football, bowling, cross country, tennis, soccer, track and field, basketball, cheerleading, drill team, baseball, softball, volleyball
- Athletics conference: Columbus City League
- Team name: Nubians
- Website: www.ccsoh.us/africentricearlycollege

Columbus Africentric Early College is a public high school in Columbus, Ohio. It is a part of Columbus City Schools. The school's previous name, Mohawk Middle School, was changed in the late 1990s, to allow the school not only separation from its original status, but also to expand it into a large school. Africentric was moved into a newly built building near the John Glenn Airport in 2016.

== Ohio High School Athletic Association State Championships ==
- Girls Basketball - 2007, 2009, 2012, 2014, 2016, 2018, 2019, 2023, 2024
- Boys Basketball 2005, [forfeited] Ruled an Ineligible player after beating Cleveland's Lutheran High School East in the State Championship

== Notable alumni ==
- Jordan Horston (2019), WNBA player for the Seattle Storm
- Dailyn Swain (2023), NBA player for the Chicago Bulls

== See also ==
- Schools in Columbus, Ohio
