= Regina High School (Ohio) =

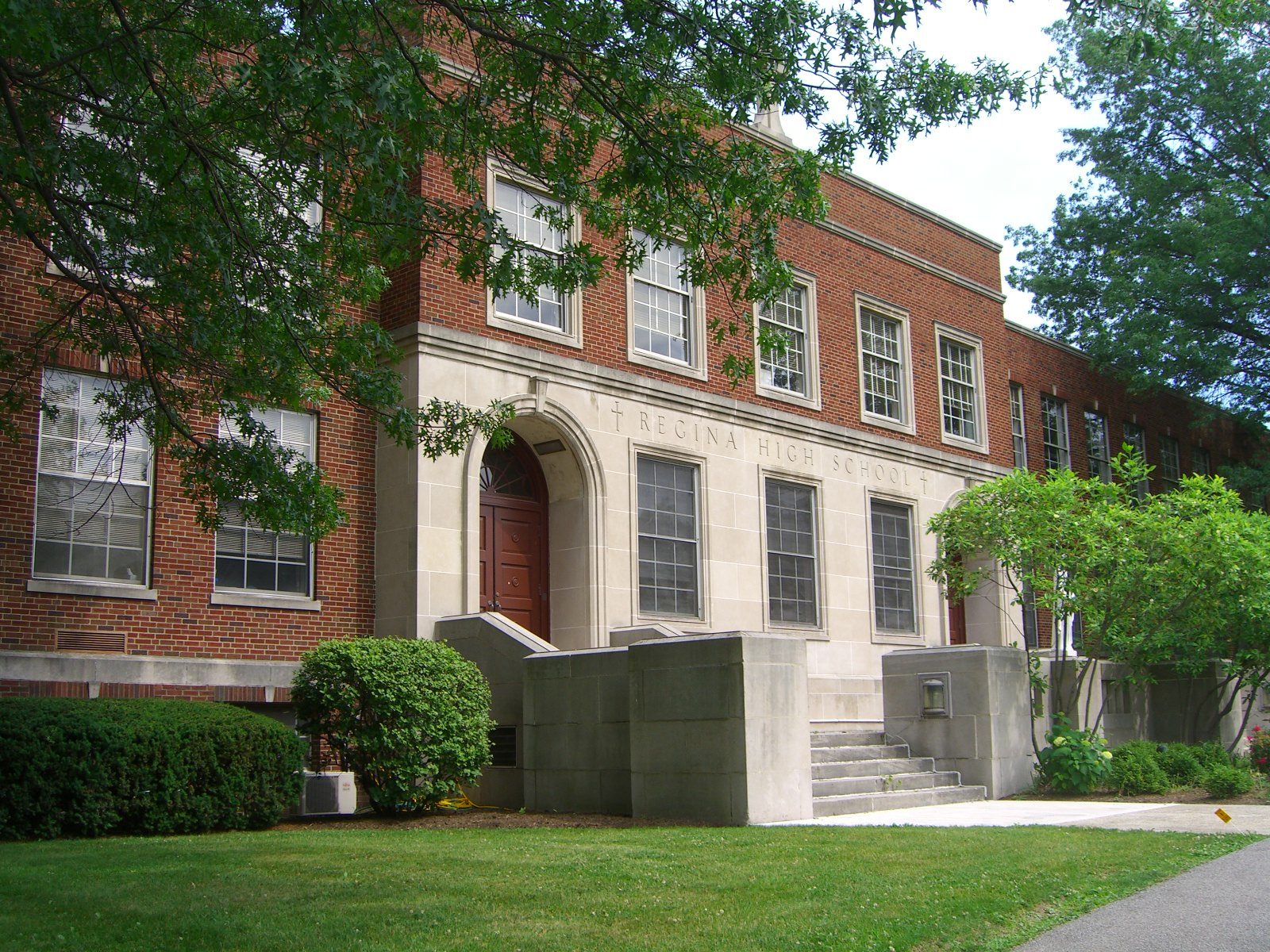

Location
- 1857 South Green Road; South Euclid, (Cuyahoga County), Ohio 44121; United States; 41°30′32.22″N 81°31′7.69″W

Information
- Type: Private, All-Girls
- Motto: With God All Things Are Possible
- Religious affiliation: Roman Catholic
- Patron saints: Mary, Queen of the Most Holy Rosary
- Closed: 2010
- Oversight: Sisters of Notre Dame, Roman Catholic Diocese of Cleveland
- Principal: Sr. Margaret Gorman
- Grades: 9–12
- Colors: Green and Gold
- Slogan: Learn ∙ Serve ∙ Lead
- Team name: Royals
- Accreditation: North Central Association of Colleges and Schools
- Publication: Green & Gold Magazine
- Newspaper: The Regent
- Yearbook: Prism
- Director of Guidance: Rosemary Lips
- Athletic Director: John Schweickert
- Website: http://www.reginahigh.com

Regina High School was a Residential School private, Catholic all-girls high school located in South Euclid, Ohio. It was run by the Sisters of Notre Dame, who also run Notre Dame College, which was located next door. It was a part of the Roman Catholic Diocese of Cleveland. Approximately one fifth of the teachers were nuns; the remaining teachers were both male and female lay persons. The school offered the students the ability to grow in an environment that supported them and encouraged them to be who they are. The school announced in October 2009 that the 2009-2010 school year would be its last. Regina's last day of classes was June 4, 2010.

== Athletics ==
The school was most notable for its basketball team, the Regina Royals, who were state champions in 2000, 2001, 2002, 2003, 2005, and 2009. The school also had soccer, volleyball, tennis, cross country, swimming, bowling, track and field, and softball teams.

=== Ohio High School Athletic Association State Championships ===
- Girls Basketball - 2000, 2001, 2002, 2003, 2005, 2009

== Extracurricular ==
Students had many extracurriculars to choose from. Regina High School was noted in the greater Cleveland Catholic community for its Clown Ministry, a group that dons face paints and performs sign language that is often religious in nature. The club performs the Stations of the Cross (set to contemporary music) every year and raises money for charities. This ministry works and dedicates their time to have a positive impact on others lives. Visiting nursing homes, serving meals at hunger centers, raising money for various organizations in need, and many other activities show only a portion of how loving and giving these girls truly are. Regina's newsmagazine, the Regent, has won awards from the Northeast Ohio Scholastic Press Association for its writing and layout. Most recently, in 2009, the Regent was awarded a first-place ranking. One other notable extracurricular activity Regina hosts is its produced musicals or plays. Past shows include Bye Bye Birdie, Honk!, Once Upon a Mattress, The Wizard of Oz, Anne of Green Gables and Rodgers and Hammerstein's Cinderella, and most recently Disney's Beauty and the Beast. The summer student-directed plays include Alice in Wonderland, The Canterbury Tales, Snow White, and Rumpelstiltskin. Performances include young male actors mainly from Benedictine High School, Saint Ignatius High School, and Mayfield High School.

== Foreign exchange and weekend supplementary programs ==
Regina also offered a foreign exchange program with its sister school in Vechta, Germany. Students who studied German had the opportunity to spend the first semester of their junior year studying at the Liebfrauenschule to further their understanding of the German language and culture.

The Japanese Language School of Cleveland (JLSC; クリーブランド日本語補習校 Kurīburando Nihongo Hoshūkō), a weekend Japanese supplementary school for Japanese nationals and Japanese Americans, previously held its classes in Regina High School. At the time its offices were in Hudson, and later, Twinsburg.

== Curriculum ==
The school offered a variety of AP and Honors courses, some of which could be taken as college credit because of the school's affiliation with Notre Dame College.

== News ==
In October 2009 it was announced that the school planned on closing its doors after the graduation of the class of 2010. A letter from the Board of Directors stated that economic downturn and drops in enrollment were the reason for the closing.

The school faced scrutiny in 2003 when it barred a Muslim student from wearing a hijab to school, citing the dress code which stated that "[n]o hats, no bandannas or head wraps are permitted." The principal, Sr. Maureen Burke, said "I feel very bad about this situation. I've agonized over it[.]" The student, Amal, told the press, "[a]ll along, they gave me a room to pray in. They asked me questions about Islam. They always accepted me for who I was. Now they have decided it is against school policy to wear my hijab."
