= Kalida, Ohio =

- Village
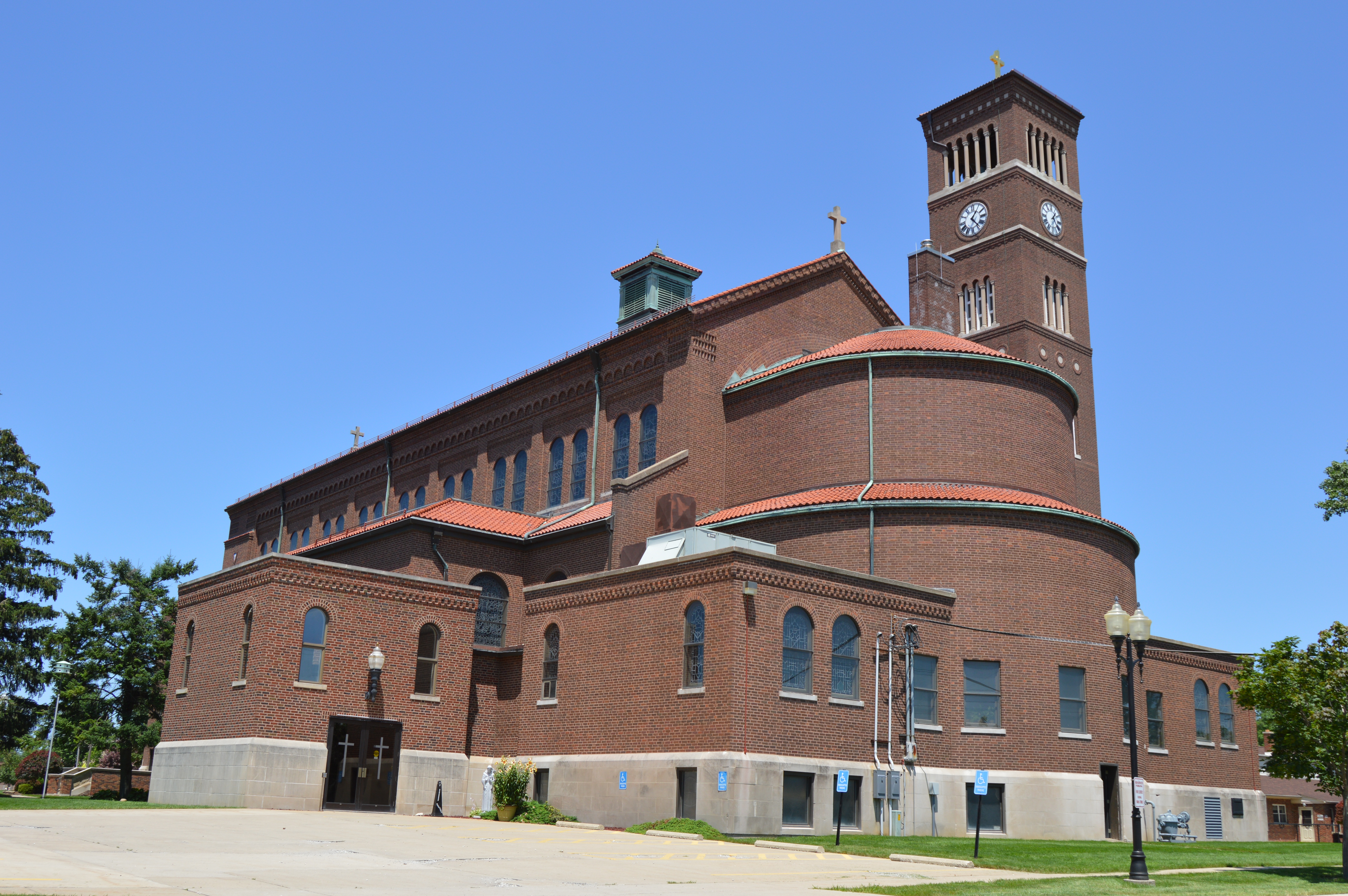
- St. Michael's Catholic Church, which dominates the skyline

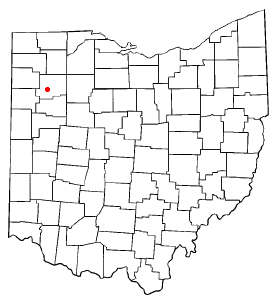
- Location of Kalida, Ohio

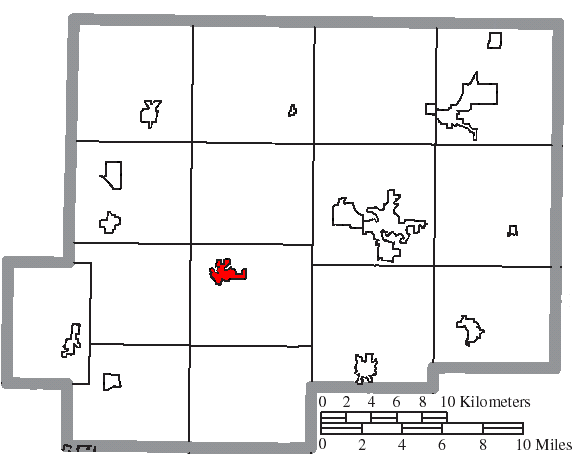
- Location of Kalida in Putnam County
- Coordinates: 40°59′07″N 84°11′40″W
- Country: United States
- State: Ohio
- County: Putnam

Area
  - Total: 1.69 sq mi (4.39 km^{2})
  - Land: 1.68 sq mi (4.35 km^{2})
  - Water: 0.015 sq mi (0.04 km^{2})
- Elevation: 725 ft (221 m)

Population (2020)
  - Total: 1,455
  - Density: 865.7/sq mi (334.25/km^{2})
- Time zone: UTC-5 (Eastern (EST))
  - Summer (DST): UTC-4 (EDT)
- ZIP code: 45853
- Area code: 419
- FIPS code: 39-39536
- GNIS feature ID: 2398321
- Website: https://www.villageofkalida.com/

Kalida (/kəˈlaɪdə/ kə-LY-də) is a village in Putnam County, Ohio, United States. The population was 1,455 at the 2020 census.

== History ==
Founded in 1834, Kalida was the first county seat of Putnam County. Kalida is a name derived from Greek meaning "beautiful". A post office has been in operation in Kalida since 1834. Kalida was incorporated as a village in 1839. The county seat was transferred to Ottawa in 1866.

The Putnam County Historical Society Museum is housed in Kalida.

== Geography ==
According to the United States Census Bureau, the village has a total area of 1.47 square miles (3.81 km^{2}), of which 1.44 square miles (3.73 km^{2}) is land and 0.03 square miles (0.08 km^{2}) is water.

== Demographics ==
Historical population
Census	Pop.	Note	%±
1850	216		—
1860	335		55.1%
1870	290		−13.4%
1880	404		39.3%
1890	444		9.9%
1900	622		40.1%
1910	770		23.8%
1920	583		−24.3%
1930	431		−26.1%
1940	521		20.9%
1950	533		2.3%
1960	705		32.3%
1970	900		27.7%
1980	1,019		13.2%
1990	947		−7.1%
2000	1,031		8.9%
2010	1,542		49.6%
2020	1,455		−5.6%
U.S. Decennial Census

=== 2010 census ===
As of the census of 2010, there were 1,542 people, 588 households, and 408 families living in the village. The population density was 1,070.8 inhabitants per square mile (413.4/km^{2}). There were 612 housing units at an average density of 425.0 per square mile (164.1/km^{2}). The racial makeup of the village was 98.7% White, 0.2% African American, 0.1% Pacific Islander, 0.6% from other races, and 0.4% from two or more races. Hispanic or Latino of any race were 1.1% of the population.

There were 588 households, of which 33.7% had children under the age of 18 living with them, 61.7% were married couples living together, 4.9% had a female householder with no husband present, 2.7% had a male householder with no wife present, and 30.6% were non-families. 28.1% of all households were made up of individuals, and 16.8% had someone living alone who was 65 years of age or older. The average household size was 2.53 and the average family size was 3.14.

The median age in the village was 39.6 years. 26.5% of residents were under the age of 18; 5.5% were between the ages of 18 and 24; 23.1% were from 25 to 44; 27.1% were from 45 to 64; and 17.7% were 65 years of age or older. The gender makeup of the village was 48.8% male and 51.2% female.

=== 2000 census ===
As of the census of 2000, there were 1,031 people, 385 households, and 284 families living in the village. The population density was 924.4 inhabitants per square mile (356.9/km^{2}). There were 397 housing units at an average density of 356.0 per square mile (137.5/km^{2}). The racial makeup of the village was 99.13% White, 0.19% Native American, 0.48% from other races, and 0.19% from two or more races. Hispanic or Latino of any race were 0.78% of the population.

There were 385 households, out of which 37.9% had children under the age of 18 living with them, 63.9% were married couples living together, 7.8% had a female householder with no husband present, and 26.2% were non-families. 24.2% of all households were made up of individuals, and 15.3% had someone living alone who was 65 years of age or older. The average household size was 2.68 and the average family size was 3.20.

In the village, the population was spread out, with 27.5% under the age of 18, 8.6% from 18 to 24, 30.7% from 25 to 44, 19.3% from 45 to 64, and 13.8% who were 65 years of age or older. The median age was 35 years. For every 100 females there were 101.4 males. For every 100 females age 18 and over, there were 97.1 males.

The median income for a household in the village was $52,411, and the median income for a family was $59,861. Males had a median income of $37,750 versus $27,065 for females. The per capita income for the village was $21,293. About 3.3% of families and 4.4% of the population were below the poverty line, including 4.1% of those under age 18 and 7.2% of those age 65 or over.

== Education ==
Kalida High School (KHS) and Kalida Elementary School (KES) are both part of the Kalida Local School District.

Kalida had a public library, a branch of the Putnam County District Library.

== Arts and culture ==
Pioneer Days is a county-wide festival held in Kalida, on the weekend following Labor Day. The festival is the oldest in Ohio.

== Notable persons ==
- David Ayers, Medal of Honor recipient
- John Wesley Hill, Methodist minister, peace campaigner, university president
- Julia Rice Seney, writer, newspaper editor, government administrator, and charity worker
- Gene "Geno" Stechschulte, St. Louis Cardinals pitcher
