= Pandora-Gilboa High School =

Public school in Ohio, United States

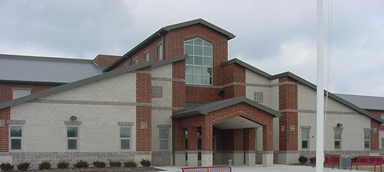

- A Nationally Recognized & Top 50 High School dedicated to preparing students for life and providing a world-class education through innovation.

Location
- 410 Rocket Ridge; Pandora, (Putnam County), Ohio 45877; United States; 40°57′16″N 83°58′12″W

Information
- Type: Public, coeducational
- Established: 1951 (Pandora-Gilboa)
- School district: Pandora-Gilboa Local School District
- Teaching staff: 13.12 (FTE)
- Grades: 9–12
- Student to teacher ratio: 13.57
- Campus size: approx. 40 acres (not including newly purchased land for the new track/stadium, land annexed to church, old school courtyard, bus garage, or pre-existing athletic fields on the old school campus)
- Colors: Scarlet and silver
- Slogan: Dream to move beyond this space; aim higher; soar farther
- Athletics conference: Putnam County League; Blanchard Valley Conference
- Sports: Football, volleyball, basketball, indoor track and field, track and field, cross country, baseball, softball, golf, cheerleading and marching band (former sports: tennis and soccer)
- Mascot: Rocket Man
- Nickname: Rockets (original mascots: Pandora: Flying Dutchmen, later changed to Fleetwings; Blanchard: Eagles)
- Rival: Leipsic High School and Columbus Grove High School
- Yearbook: Mirror
- Communities served: Pandora, Gilboa, and parts of Ottawa, Bluffton, Columbus Grove, and Leipsic (as well as Cory-Rawson and McComb School Districts)
- Athletic Director: Zach Weber
- Website: www.pgrockets.org/150939_3

Pandora-Gilboa High School is a state technology prototype public high school centered in Pandora, Ohio. It is the only high school and school in the Pandora-Gilboa Local School district. The district serves students from Pandora, Gilboa, and parts of Riley, Blanchard, and Pleasant townships in Putnam County. The school district origins begin with Pandora High School,which was the first rural consolidated school district in the state combining Pandora Village Schools and Riley Township Schools and the historic school of Crawfis College (later became part of Blanchard High School in Gilboa and consolidated with Pandora in 1951). In 2015, Pandora-Gilboa was recognized on the list of the top 50 schools in the country at preparing students of any income level for higher education from anywhere to a technical school to the best of the Ivy Leagues such as Harvard University.

== Technology ==
Pandora-Gilboa is a technology prototype high school. The former technology coordinator was the State of Ohio High School President of Technology. Technology used by students throughout the building includes SMART Boards, Microsoft Surface tablets, desktop computers and personal Chromebooks. Each student from 5th grade to 12th gets receives their own Chromebook laptop. Pandora's engineering program is sponsored by Grob corporation and has recently started the Pandora-Gilboa Engineering Design group, another entrepreneurial club the school offers.

== Academics ==
Pandora-Gilboa has been ranked in the Ohio Department of Education top school rankings list. Pandora-Gilboa has achieved the highest mathematics score in the state (as well as other categories, such as English and Science placing within the top 5 scores) in the OAT/OAA. Pandora-Gilboa has had the highest OGT scores in Putnam County and surrounding counties. The students have achieved the third highest scores in the state. Ohio Department of Education's school report has been positive over the last 10 years High school students have many opportunities to learn beyond the high school level and enroll in classes from institutions such as The University of Findlay, James A. Rhodes State/Ohio State, and Ohio Northern University that are all taught by our staff right here. Some Advanced Placement classes offer curriculum from IVY League schools. Additionally, students have the option to enroll at nearby universities to take classes there if desired. The school has middle school and high school academic teams which have been successful over the years, achieving county titles.

In addition to traditional academics, Pandora offers advanced STEM and finance classes, such as biomedical, engineering, architecture, robotics, accounting, and business & personal financing.

In addition to outstanding test scores, the middle school traditionally takes home the National Woodmen of America county, region, state, and previously the national championship title on previous occasions.

In 2024, The High School Quiz Bowl / Academic Competition Team won the state tournament and finished their regular season with the JV and junior high team all with a perfect record of 75-0!

== Arts ==
Visual arts: Taught by Mrs. Ali Verhoff, students participate in many different mediums: painted/sketched pieces, to spun/molded clay, carved wooden pieces, digital art pieces, and even glass pieces.

- Audical/Performing Arts
- Choir
- Marching band
- Graphic Design
- 3-D printing

== Athletics ==
Pandora-Gilboa is a member of the Blanchard Valley Conference and the Putnam County League.

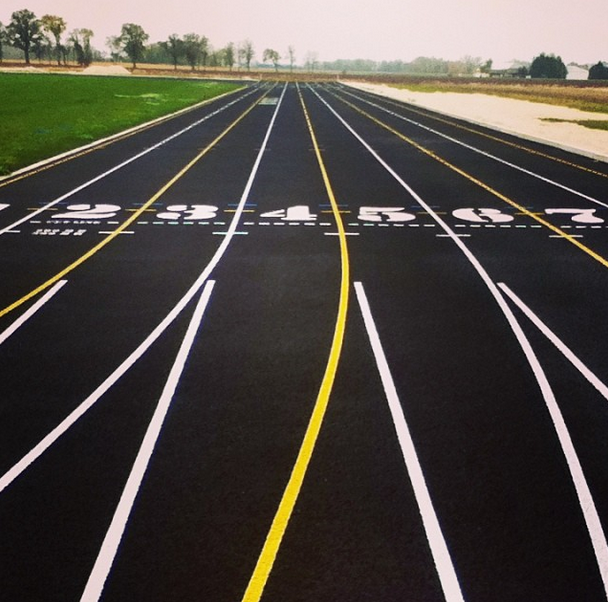
All-weather track

Pandora-Gilboa is notable for sending many student athletes to NCAA schools (Div I/Div II) in all sports that are offered by the athletic department.

In 2010, Girls Basketball finished their season 21-3 (Loses to AP #1, BVC, and Division 3 State Champion Liberty-Benton, and AP #1,PCL winner, Regional semi-finalist Ottoville) falling to state semi-finalist Minster (Midwest Athletic Conference)

Pandora-Gilboa's volleyball team was state ranked No. 4 and was the only undefeated team left in Ohio, until their last tournament game. The volleyball team won PCL 7–0 and BVC 9–0 finishing with a final record of 24–1. Pandora-Gilboa has won State Runners up in Track & Field. Pandora-Gilboa also has many individuals win state in track, breaking state records.

After Pandora-Gilboa's men's track team becoming state runners up a new track was constructed behind Pandora- Gilboa's new state-of-the-art, approx. $20,000,000.00 school.

2018 was the best year in the program for football, Going undefeated entering the OHSAA DIV VII Playoff as one of top seeds and reaching the regional finals for the second time in program history (2017 was the first falling to #1 Norwalk St. Paul). The season came to an end by a loss following a series of injuries the game before. McComb ended up becoming the state champions as they avoided P-G in playoffs by one game ( P-G held them to only one offensive TD and won during the incredible game during the season to win the BVC)

2017-2018 Boys Basketball Season ended at the OHSAA State Semi-Finals losing to State Champion Marion Local of the MAC (Midwest Athletic Conference) by 1 point, who also defeated Cornerstone Christian in 2OT by just one point, by a score of 52–54. This was the first season in school history to win both Putnam County League (PCL) and Blanchard Valley Conference (BVC) titles, as well advance passed the regional semi final game. The team finished with a record of 27–2 (only season loss at nonconference Upper Scioto Valley by 3 points), both coach and player of the year awards in both conferences, all state and state tournament players.

== Ohio High School Athletic Association State Championships ==
2009 OHSAA Div III Boys Track & Field State Runners-Up

2018 OHSAA Div IV Boys Basketball Final 4 (lost by 1 point to state champs Marion Local, who won the title by 1 in double overtime)

== Board of education ==
- Dawn Schulte, President
- Angie Basinger
- Vance Nofziger
- Kathy Amstutz
- Jill Torress

== Administration ==
- Jeff Wise, Superintendent
- Brad Deleruyelle, Treasurer
- Eric Vennekotter, Technology Coordinator
- Matthew Kelly, High School Principal
- Jodi Schroeder Elementary/Middle School Principal
