= Pandora, Ohio =

- Village
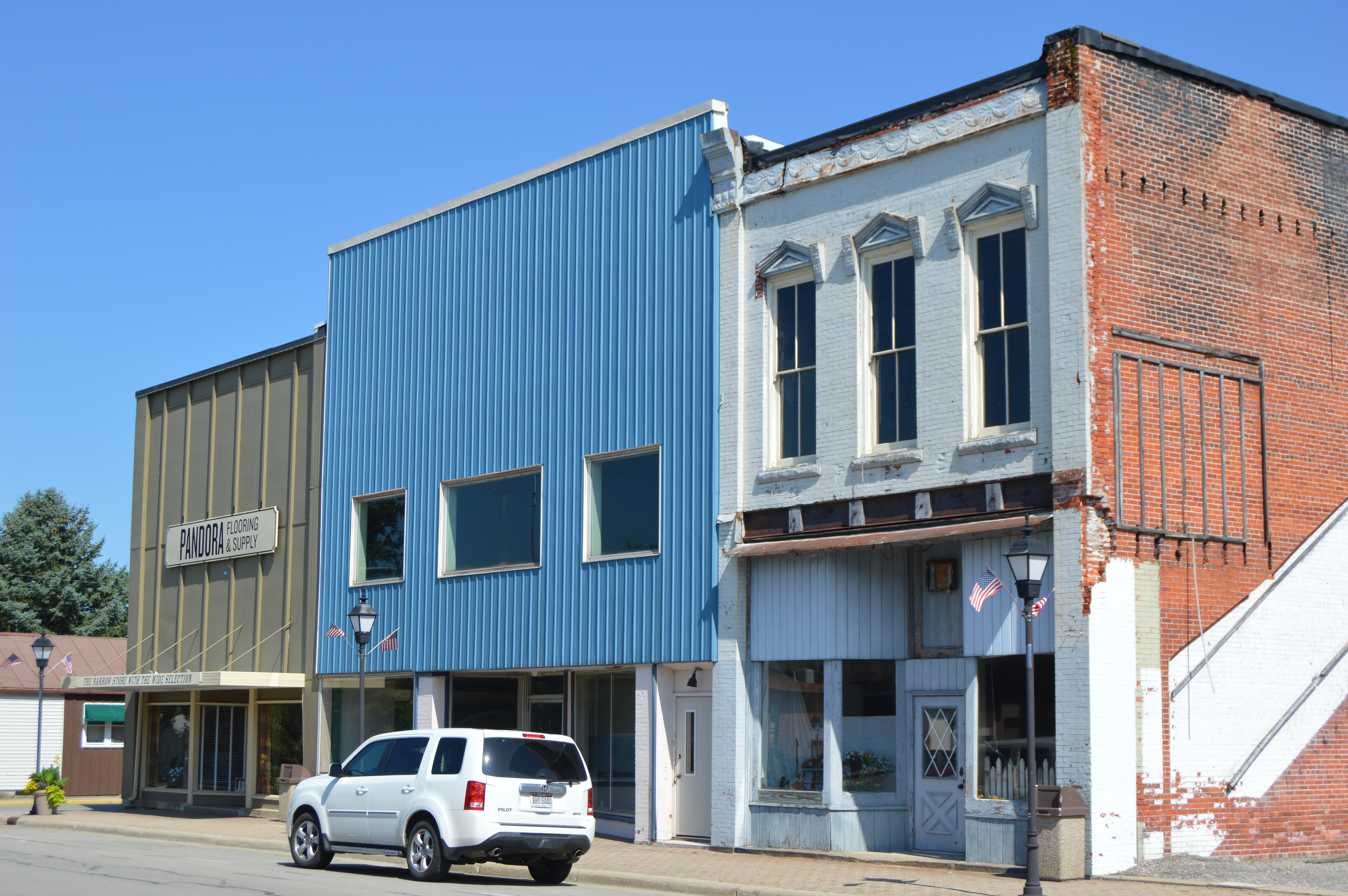
- Buildings on the northern side of Main Street in Pandora
- Motto: The Garden Spot of Ohio
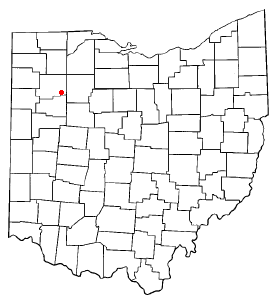
- Location of Pandora, Ohio

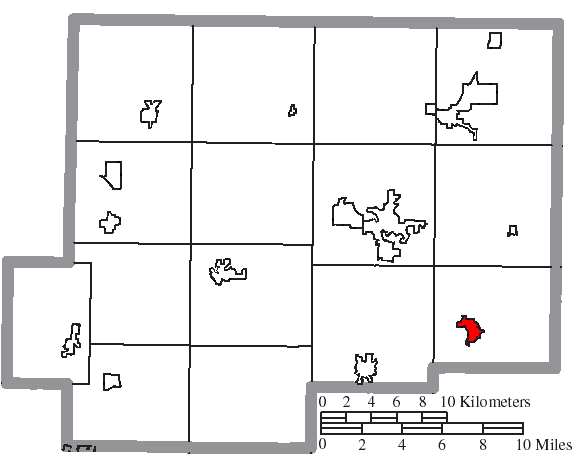
- Location of Pandora in Putnam County
- Coordinates: 40°56′51″N 83°57′24″W
- Country: United States
- State: Ohio
- County: Putnam

Area
  - Total: 1.08 sq mi (2.81 km^{2})
  - Land: 1.07 sq mi (2.76 km^{2})
  - Water: 0.015 sq mi (0.04 km^{2})
- Elevation: 774 ft (236 m)

Population (2020)
  - Total: 1,204
  - Density: 1,129.7/sq mi (436.19/km^{2})
- Time zone: UTC-5 (Eastern (EST))
  - Summer (DST): UTC-4 (EDT)
- ZIP code: 45877
- Area code: 419
- FIPS code: 39-59738
- GNIS feature ID: 2399619
- Website: villageofpandora.com

Pandora is a village in Putnam County, Ohio, United States, located on the Riley Creek. The population was 1,204 at the 2020 census.

== History ==
Pandora was originally called Columbia, and under the latter name was laid out in 1837. Another early variant name was Pendleton. A post office was established as Pendleton in 1837, and the name was changed to Pandora in 1883. Pandora was incorporated as a village in 1892.

== Geography ==
According to the United States Census Bureau, the village has a total area of 0.92 square miles (2.38 km^{2}), of which 0.90 square miles (2.33 km^{2}) is land and 0.02 square miles (0.05 km^{2}) is water.

=== Climate ===
Climate data for Pandora, Ohio (1991–2020 normals, extremes 1949–present)
Month	Jan	Feb	Mar	Apr	May	Jun	Jul	Aug	Sep	Oct	Nov	Dec	Year
Record high °F (°C)	70 (21)	73 (23)	86 (30)	89 (32)	96 (36)	103 (39)	102 (39)	101 (38)	100 (38)	91 (33)	80 (27)	71 (22)	103 (39)
Mean maximum °F (°C)	56.5 (13.6)	59.4 (15.2)	70.0 (21.1)	80.3 (26.8)	87.7 (30.9)	92.7 (33.7)	92.8 (33.8)	91.4 (33.0)	89.4 (31.9)	82.2 (27.9)	68.5 (20.3)	59.2 (15.1)	94.5 (34.7)
Mean daily maximum °F (°C)	33.4 (0.8)	37.1 (2.8)	47.8 (8.8)	61.2 (16.2)	72.5 (22.5)	80.9 (27.2)	84.1 (28.9)	82.2 (27.9)	76.4 (24.7)	63.8 (17.7)	49.9 (9.9)	38.2 (3.4)	60.6 (15.9)
Daily mean °F (°C)	26.4 (−3.1)	29.4 (−1.4)	38.7 (3.7)	50.4 (10.2)	61.9 (16.6)	70.9 (21.6)	73.9 (23.3)	71.9 (22.2)	65.4 (18.6)	53.8 (12.1)	41.7 (5.4)	31.6 (−0.2)	51.3 (10.7)
Mean daily minimum °F (°C)	19.4 (−7.0)	21.6 (−5.8)	29.6 (−1.3)	39.7 (4.3)	51.3 (10.7)	60.8 (16.0)	63.7 (17.6)	61.6 (16.4)	54.3 (12.4)	43.8 (6.6)	33.5 (0.8)	25.1 (−3.8)	42.0 (5.6)
Mean minimum °F (°C)	−3.1 (−19.5)	1.1 (−17.2)	11.3 (−11.5)	23.7 (−4.6)	35.2 (1.8)	45.9 (7.7)	51.4 (10.8)	49.0 (9.4)	39.3 (4.1)	28.6 (−1.9)	17.6 (−8.0)	5.6 (−14.7)	−6.0 (−21.1)
Record low °F (°C)	−21 (−29)	−23 (−31)	−13 (−25)	6 (−14)	23 (−5)	37 (3)	42 (6)	36 (2)	28 (−2)	18 (−8)	−3 (−19)	−19 (−28)	−23 (−31)
Average precipitation inches (mm)	2.61 (66)	2.20 (56)	2.61 (66)	3.80 (97)	4.36 (111)	4.28 (109)	4.04 (103)	3.47 (88)	3.09 (78)	2.83 (72)	2.82 (72)	2.56 (65)	38.67 (982)
Average snowfall inches (cm)	10.6 (27)	8.3 (21)	4.3 (11)	0.8 (2.0)	0.0 (0.0)	0.0 (0.0)	0.0 (0.0)	0.0 (0.0)	0.0 (0.0)	0.1 (0.25)	1.9 (4.8)	6.5 (17)	32.5 (83)
Average precipitation days (≥ 0.01 in)	13.6	10.7	11.5	13.4	13.6	11.9	10.6	9.5	9.3	10.7	10.1	11.8	136.7
Average snowy days (≥ 0.1 in)	8.7	6.3	3.7	0.7	0.0	0.0	0.0	0.0	0.0	0.2	1.8	5.5	26.9
Source: NOAA

== Demographics ==
Historical population
Census	Pop.	Note	%±
1890	568		—
1900	675		18.8%
1910	800		18.5%
1920	669		−16.4%
1930	588		−12.1%
1940	690		17.3%
1950	717		3.9%
1960	782		9.1%
1970	857		9.6%
1980	977		14.0%
1990	1,009		3.3%
2000	1,188		17.7%
2010	1,153		−2.9%
2020	1,204		4.4%
U.S. Decennial Census

=== 2010 census ===
As of the census of 2010, there were 1,153 people, 452 households, and 320 families living in the village. The population density was 1,281.1 inhabitants per square mile (494.6/km^{2}). There were 486 housing units at an average density of 540.0 per square mile (208.5/km^{2}). The racial makeup of the village was 97.2% White, 0.3% African American, 0.3% Native American, 1.6% from other races, and 0.6% from two or more races. Hispanic or Latino of any race were 3.4% of the population. 56.8% were of German, 18.0% Swiss, 11.7% Irish, 8.7% English, and 5.9% French descent.

There were 452 households, of which 31.9% had children under the age of 18 living with them, 58.8% were married couples living together, 8.2% had a female householder with no husband present, 3.8% had a male householder with no wife present, and 29.2% were non-families. 27.0% of all households were made up of individuals, and 10.9% had someone living alone who was 65 years of age or older. The average household size was 2.43 and the average family size was 2.91.

The median age in the village was 40 years. 24.4% of residents were under the age of 18; 6.8% were between the ages of 18 and 24; 25.6% were from 25 to 44; 24.6% were from 45 to 64; and 18.6% were 65 years of age or older. The gender makeup of the village was 49.1% male and 50.9% female.

=== 2000 census ===
As of the census of 2000, there were 1,188 people, 442 households, and 331 families living in the village. The population density was 1,462.0 inhabitants per square mile (564.5/km^{2}). There were 458 housing units at an average density of 563.7 per square mile (217.6/km^{2}). The racial makeup of the village was 98.74% White, 0.34% African American, 0.59% from other races, and 0.34% from two or more races. Hispanic or Latino of any race were 1.26% of the population.

There were 442 households, out of which 35.5% had children under the age of 18 living with them, 64.7% were married couples living together, 6.3% had a female householder with no husband present, and 25.1% were non-families. 22.6% of all households were made up of individuals, and 10.9% had someone living alone who was 65 years of age or older. The average household size was 2.51 and the average family size was 2.96.

In the village, the population was spread out, with 24.8% under the age of 18, 7.7% from 18 to 24, 27.5% from 25 to 44, 19.6% from 45 to 64, and 20.4% who were 65 years of age or older. The median age was 38 years. For every 100 females there were 90.4 males. For every 100 females age 18 and over, there were 86.0 males.

The median income for a household in the village was $42,174, and the median income for a family was $49,500. Males had a median income of $36,597 versus $21,830 for females. The per capita income for the village was $17,816. About 2.7% of families and 4.0% of the population were below the poverty line, including 2.5% of those under age 18 and 4.7% of those age 65 or over.

== Education ==
Pandora-Gilboa Local Schools operates one elementary school, one middle school, and Pandora-Gilboa High School.

Pandora has a public library, a branch of the Putnam County District Library.

== Arts and culture ==
The village hosts the Riley Creek Festival & Ted Fest. It is also the home of Suter Produce, which in the summer is known for its strawberries and fresh sweet corn, and in the fall for its cider and corn maze.

== Notable people ==
- Arthur H. Day, Ohio state senator and Ohio Supreme Court justice
- Cyrus Locher, United States Senator
- Benjamin F. Welty, United States Representative
