= Miller City, Ohio =

- Village
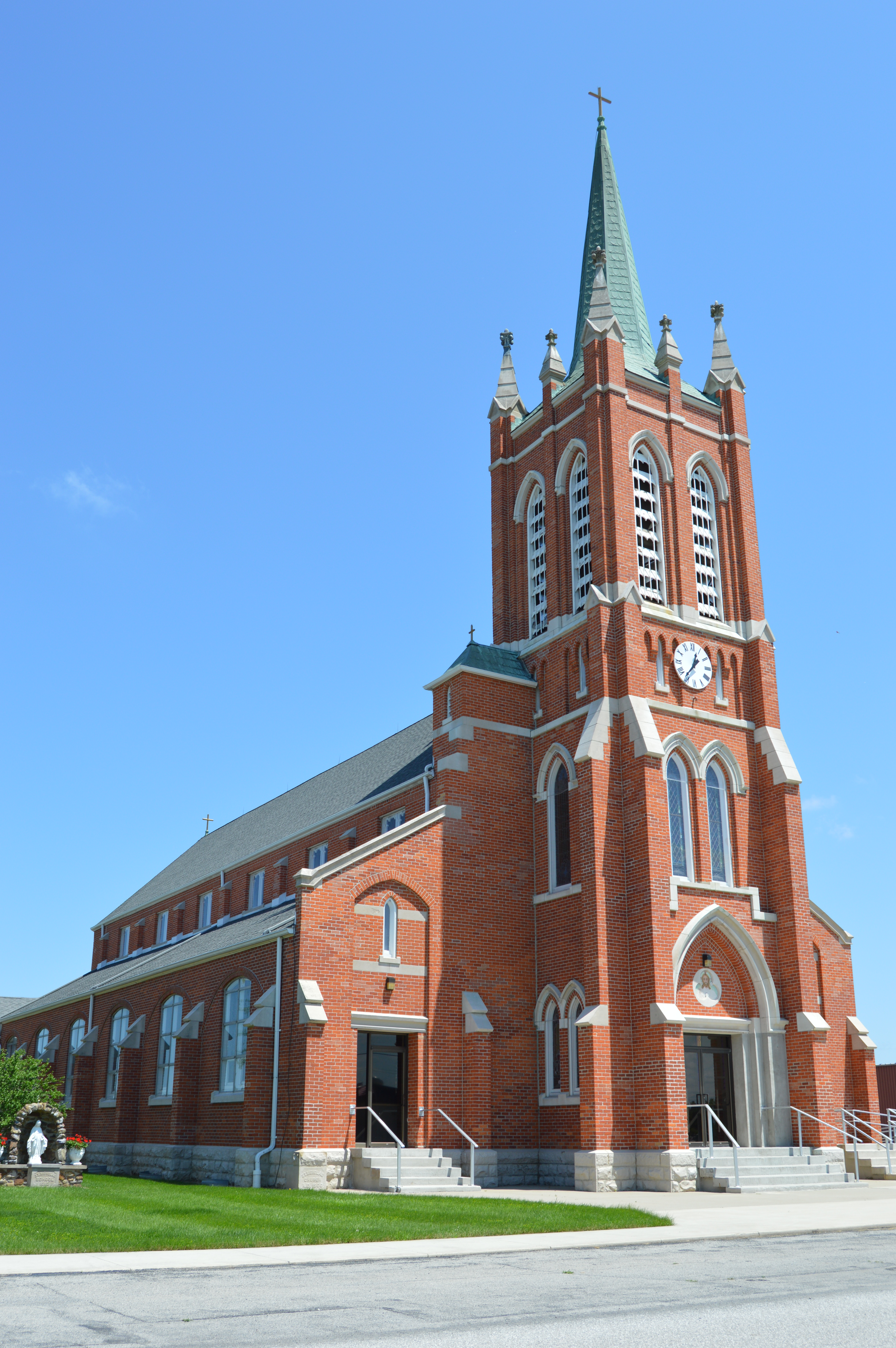
- St. Nicholas' Catholic

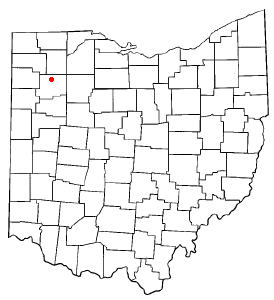
- Location of Miller City, Ohio

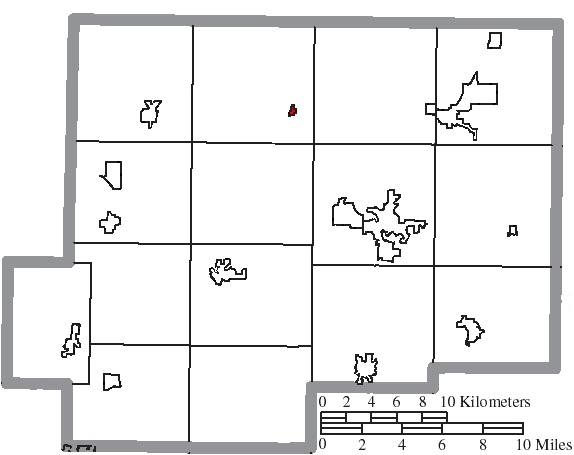
- Location of Miller City in Putnam County
- Coordinates: 41°06′15″N 84°07′36″W
- Country: United States
- State: Ohio
- County: Putnam

Area
  - Total: 0.40 sq mi (1.03 km^{2})
  - Land: 0.40 sq mi (1.03 km^{2})
  - Water: 0 sq mi (0.00 km^{2})
- Elevation: 728 ft (222 m)

Population (2020)
  - Total: 134
  - Density: 338.1/sq mi (130.53/km^{2})
- Time zone: UTC-5 (Eastern (EST))
  - Summer (DST): UTC-4 (EDT)
- ZIP code: 45864
- Area codes: 419, 567
- FIPS code: 39-50358
- GNIS feature ID: 2399356

Miller City is a village in Putnam County, Ohio, United States. The population was 134 at the 2020 census.

== History ==
Miller City was originally called St. Nicholas, and under the latter name was platted in 1882 by Nicholas Miller, and named for him. A post office called Miller City has been in operation since 1883. Miller City was incorporated as a village in 1890.

== Geography ==
According to the United States Census Bureau, the village has a total area of 0.30 square miles (0.78 km^{2}), all land.

== Demographics ==
Historical population
Census	Pop.	Note	%±
1900	163		—
1910	218		33.7%
1920	195		−10.6%
1930	184		−5.6%
1940	174		−5.4%
1950	144		−17.2%
1960	149		3.5%
1970	206		38.3%
1980	168		−18.4%
1990	173		3.0%
2000	136		−21.4%
2010	137		0.7%
2020	134		−2.2%
U.S. Decennial Census

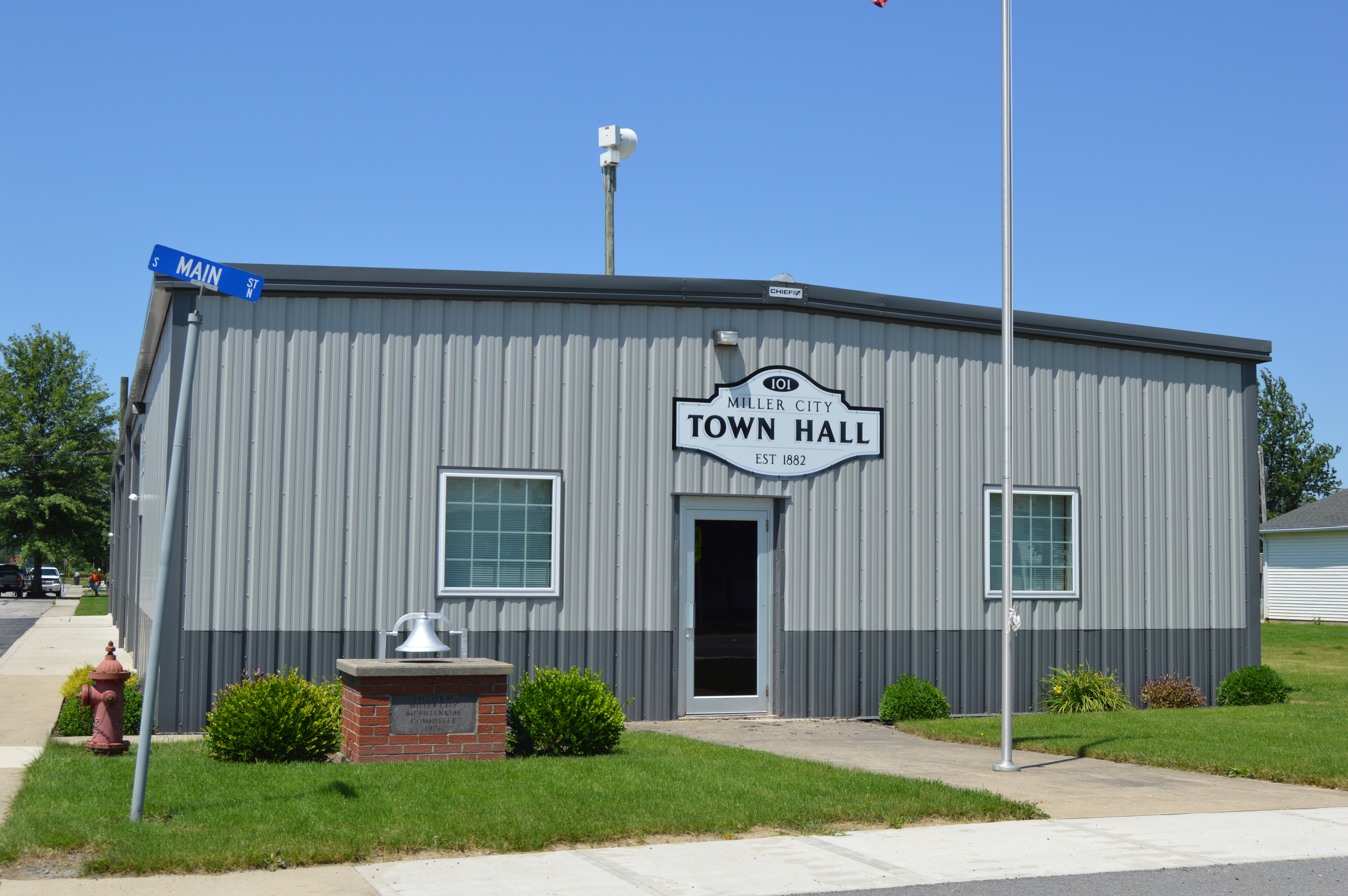
Miller City Village Hall

=== 2010 census ===
As of the census of 2010, there were 137 people, 61 households, and 41 families living in the village. The population density was 456.7 inhabitants per square mile (176.3/km^{2}). There were 66 housing units at an average density of 220.0 per square mile (84.9/km^{2}). The racial makeup of the village was 100.0% White.

There were 61 households, of which 29.5% had children under the age of 18 living with them, 57.4% were married couples living together, 4.9% had a female householder with no husband present, 4.9% had a male householder with no wife present, and 32.8% were non-families. 27.9% of all households were made up of individuals, and 13.1% had someone living alone who was 65 years of age or older. The average household size was 2.25 and the average family size was 2.78.

The median age in the village was 40.8 years. 19.7% of residents were under the age of 18; 7.4% were between the ages of 18 and 24; 24.8% were from 25 to 44; 26.2% were from 45 to 64; and 21.9% were 65 years of age or older. The gender makeup of the village was 50.4% male and 49.6% female.

=== 2000 census ===
As of the census of 2000, there were 136 people, 51 households, and 36 families living in the village. The population density was 1,152.3 inhabitants per square mile (444.9/km^{2}). There were 55 housing units at an average density of 466.0 per square mile (179.9/km^{2}). The racial makeup of the village was 96.32% White, 0.74% from other races, and 2.94% from two or more races. Hispanic or Latino of any race were 5.15% of the population.

There were 51 households, out of which 25.5% had children under the age of 18 living with them, 62.7% were married couples living together, 2.0% had a female householder with no husband present, and 27.5% were non-families. 25.5% of all households were made up of individuals, and 11.8% had someone living alone who was 65 years of age or older. The average household size was 2.65 and the average family size was 3.08.

In the village, the population was spread out, with 26.5% under the age of 18, 11.0% from 18 to 24, 22.8% from 25 to 44, 16.2% from 45 to 64, and 23.5% who were 65 years of age or older. The median age was 36 years. For every 100 females there were 94.3 males. For every 100 females age 18 and over, there were 96.1 males.

The median income for a household in the village was $43,125, and the median income for a family was $53,750. Males had a median income of $41,250 versus $18,333 for females. The per capita income for the village was $20,427. There were no families and 1.0% of the population living below the poverty line, including no under eighteens and none of those over 64.
