= 2002 Veterans Day weekend tornado outbreak =

Severe weather event in the eastern United States

Veterans Day weekend tornado outbreak
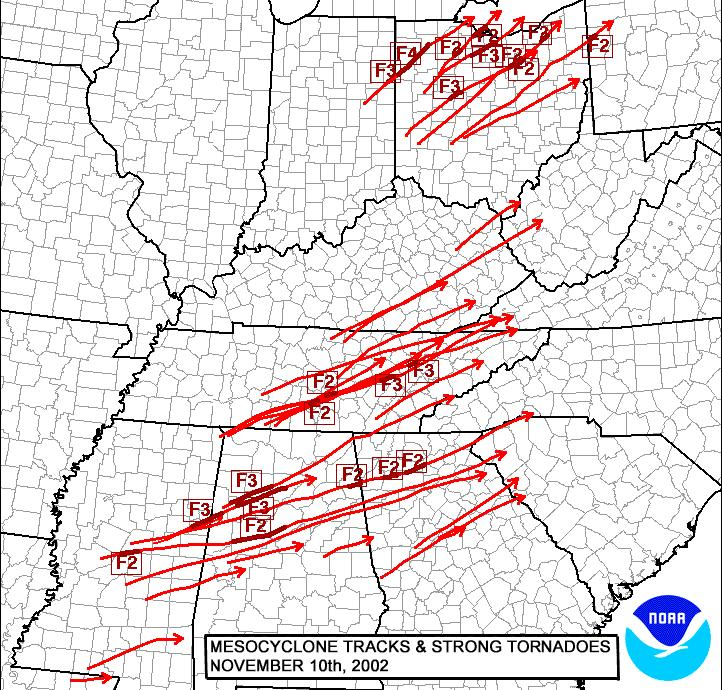
- Map of mesocyclone paths and approximate points of F2+ tornadoes on November 10.

Meteorological history
- Duration: November 9–11, 2002

Tornado outbreak
- Tornadoes: 76 confirmed
- Max. rating: F4 tornado
- Duration: 31 hours, 22 minutes
- Highest gusts: 91 mph (146 km/h) in Sweetwater, Tennessee
- Largest hail: 2.5 in (64 mm) in Canal Lewisville, Ohio

Overall effects
- Fatalities: 36
- Injuries: 303
- Damage: $1.2 billion
- Areas affected: Southeast U.S. and Ohio Valley
- Part of the tornadoes of 2002

The 2002 Veterans Day weekend tornado outbreak was an unusually severe and expansive severe weather event across portions of the Central and Eastern United States from the evening hours of November 9 into the early morning hours of Veterans Day, November 11, 2002. A series of troughs tracked eastward across the United States, providing strong wind shear, while anomalously warm and unstable air surged northward into the Ohio River Valley. As a result, multiple tornadoes occurred across Arkansas, Tennessee, and Missouri on November 9. A far more widespread and severe event occurred the following day, with three distinct tornado outbreaks focused across areas from Illinois to Pennsylvania; Tennessee and Kentucky; and areas from Mississippi to South Carolina. The most intense tornado of the outbreak was a violent F4 tornado that occurred near Van Wert, Ohio. A total of 76 tornadoes occurred during the 3-day period, collectively resulting in 36 deaths and 303 injuries. As of 2022, the event ranks as the third-largest tornado outbreak on record in November.

== Meteorological synopsis ==
=== November 9 ===
The first signs for organized severe weather became apparent on November 7, when the Storm Prediction Center (SPC) outlined a Slight risk across portions of the mid-Mississippi and western Ohio River valleys valid for November 9. On that day, a powerful and negatively-tilted upper-level trough upwards of 150 kn (175 mph; 280 km/h) was observed driving east-southeastward toward the U.S. Central and Southern Plains. While a shortwave trough at the leading edge of this feature progressed across the Texas Panhandle, a surface area of low pressure resided across the Central and Northern Plains. Southerly flow associated with the cyclone prompted the northward advection of moisture from the Gulf of Mexico, with dewpoints rising into the lower 60s °F as far north as southern Illinois; this moisture promoted modest destabilization and mid-level convective available potential energy (CAPE) values from 500 to 1,000 J/kg. As the shortwave trough continued eastward, it aided in the formation of thunderstorms across northeastern Arkansas around 00:00 UTC. These storms resided in a strongly sheared environment, with storm relative helicity – a measure of the potential for cyclonic updrafts – around 800 m2/s2. Despite initial concern that the lower levels of the atmosphere were not quite as favorable, evening atmospheric soundings from Little Rock, Arkansas, and Memphis, Tennessee, showcased an extremely favorable environment for significant tornadoes. Clusters of supercells tracked from Arkansas into Tennessee over ensuing hours, and in fact, the persistence of these storms resulted in the formation of a weak outflow boundary that further enhanced the tornado threat. A total of 10 tornadoes occurred throughout the evening of November 9, including multiple strong tornadoes and one that killed two people near Huntingdon, Tennessee.

=== November 10–11 ===
Outbreak death toll
State	Total	County	County total
Alabama	12	Cherokee	1
Alabama	12	Walker	10
Alabama	12	Winston	1
Mississippi	1	Lowndes	1
Ohio	5	Putnam	2
Ohio	5	Seneca	1
Ohio	5	Van Wert	2
Pennsylvania	1	Mercer	1
Tennessee	17	Carroll	2
Tennessee	17	Coffee	2
Tennessee	17	Cumberland	4
Tennessee	17	Montgomery	2
Tennessee	17	Morgan	7
Total	36		
All deaths were tornado-related

On November 10, the SPC warned of the potential for a significant tornado outbreak and/or widespread damaging wind episode across northeastern Mississippi, much of Tennessee, northwestern Alabama, and much of Kentucky, where the organization issued a High risk of severe weather. Morning upper-air analyses showed mid- to upper-level winds of 100–150 kn (115–175 mph; 185–280 km/h) across the southern Rocky Mountains, as well as an embedded shortwave trough moving east toward the Mississippi and Ohio River valleys. At the surface, a strong area of low pressure was positioned over Wisconsin and moving northeastward toward Ontario. Throughout the afternoon hours, the tornado outbreak unfolded in three distinct locations. To the north across Indiana and Ohio, temperatures rose into the lower 70s and dewpoints climbed into the mid-60s °F, supporting CAPE values of 1,000–2,000 J/kg. In addition, significant pressure falls in the region contributed to backed surface winds, aiding in favorable low-level shear profiles. Although storms in this region were initially congealed into a squall line ahead of a cold front, the presence of strong shear and dry air in the mid-levels supported the line's breakdown into supercells and bowing segments. Ahead of this activity, additional discrete supercells overspread much of Ohio owing to a prefrontal trough. A long-tracked, violent F4 tornado began in Van Wert and tracked for over 52 mi (84 km), killing 4 people and injuring 17 others. An F3 tornado near Tiffin killed one person and injured two others. An F2 tornado in Clark, Pennsylvania, killed 1 person. Numerous other tornadoes were recorded throughout the afternoon. The event evolved into more of a significant damaging wind episode as storms progressed farther east into Pennsylvania by the evening hours.

With the northern outbreak unfolding, a central outbreak simultaneously overspread portions of Tennessee and Kentucky, while a southern outbreak spanned areas from Mississippi into South Carolina. Surface observations and atmospheric soundings across the High and Moderate risk areas showed a very unstable environment with surface-based CAPE values in the 2,000–3,000 J/kg range. Despite the presence of a cap, this inversion was weak and expected to be eroded by warming daytime temperatures. Meanwhile, deep-layer wind shear of 50–60 kn (60–70 mph; 95–110 km/h) overspread the area. Though shear profiles were largely unidirectional initially, low-level winds were expected to become more conducive for discrete supercells and tornadoes. As expected, temperatures climbing to around 80 °F (27 °C) and dewpoints reaching the mid-60s °F allowed for deep convective development into the afternoon. Multiple swaths of supercells developed throughout the region, including one in middle Tennessee, a second from central Mississippi into northwestern Alabama, and a third from northeastern Louisiana into central Mississippi. Fatal tornadoes occurred near Shelbyville, Joyner, and Crossville in Tennessee; Carbon Hill, Saragossa, and Centre in Alabama; and Crawford in Mississippi. Numerous other tornadoes were documented throughout the area. Much like the outbreak farther north, the event transitioned into more of a damaging wind event by the evening hours, though a few tornadoes still occurred during the early morning hours across Georgia and South Carolina.

== Confirmed tornadoes ==
Confirmed tornadoes by Fujita rating
FU	F0	F1	F2	F3	F4	F5	Total
0	18	31	18	8	1	0	76

=== November 9 event ===
List of confirmed tornadoes – Saturday, November 9, 2002 (Note: All dates are based on the local time zone where the tornado touched down; however, all times are in Coordinated Universal Time for consistency.)
F#	Location	County / Parish	State	Start Coord.	Time (UTC)	Path length	Max width	Summary
F2	N of Parkin, AR to NE of Covington, TN	Cross (AR), Crittenden (AR), Mississippi (AR), Tipton (TN)	AR, TN	35.35°N 90.5333°W	03:15–04:30	50.6 mi (81.4 km)	440 yd (400 m)	In Arkansas, two farm houses and a mobile home were destroyed while a church, five homes and three mobile homes were damaged. Several other farm buildings were damaged along with trees and power lines being blown down. In Tennessee, 28 mobile homes, 5 houses, and 1 business were destroyed. Over 275 other structures were damaged, and 1 injury was recorded when a man was hit by falling bricks in downtown Covington.
F2	NE of Bells	Crockett	TN	35.7333°N 89.05°W	04:15	4 mi (6.4 km)	220 yd (200 m)	Six mobile homes and four houses were destroyed. Over 60 other structures were damaged as well.
F2	SW of Huntingdon	Carroll	TN	35.8667°N 88.5667°W	04:26–04:44	10 mi (16 km)	220 yd (200 m)	2 deaths – The two fatalities were recorded in a mobile home park that was hit by a tornado. In addition to destroyed mobile homes, three houses, two businesses and a farm building were destroyed. Forty other structures were damaged.
F0	N of Jackson	Cape Girardeau	MO	37.4333°N 89.6167°W	04:58–04:59	0.8 mi (1.3 km)	50 yd (46 m)	A trailer was destroyed while one metal barn and a few homes sustained roof/shingle damage.

=== November 10 event ===
List of confirmed tornadoes – Sunday, November 10, 2002
F#	Location	County / Parish	State	Start Coord.	Time (UTC)	Path length	Max width	Summary
F1	NW of Jackson	Madison	TN	35.66667°N 88.9°W	06:10–06:20	4 mi (6.4 km)	220 yd (200 m)	A tornado moved through Union University, heavily damaging several buildings and about 500 cars on campus. It also hit a subdivision, destroying a home and inflicting damage to 140 others.
F1	SW of Adams	Montgomery	TN	36.51°N 87.20°W	06:50–?	6 mi (9.7 km)	400 yd (370 m)	2 deaths – The fatalities were inside one of three mobile homes that were blown or lifted off of their foundations. Sixty homes and one building were damaged as well. The National Centers for Environmental Information erroneously lists this tornado as three separate entries.
F2	Portland	Robertson, Sumner	TN	36.58°N 86.61°W	07:48–?	5.19 mi (8.35 km)	900 yd (820 m)	Major damage occurred in Portland. Seven homes, one business, and seven mobile homes were destroyed. A total of 18 outbuildings, 16 barns, 29 homes, 8 mobile homes, 2 churches and 1 business suffered minor to major damage. Vehicles were tossed and damaged as well, including a truck that was rolled 90 feet (27 m). A building in an industrial park near Portland was also heavily damaged. Six injuries were recorded. The National Centers for Environmental Information erroneously lists the details of this tornado.
F1	SW of Scottsville	Allen	KY	36.6333°N 86.3333°W	08:00–08:02	1.5 mi (2.4 km)	25 yd (23 m)	One mobile home tumbled down a large hill, while additional minor structural damage was reported.
F1	SW of Hartford City	Blackford	IN	40.4°N 85.4333°W	19:30–19:36	5 mi (8.0 km)	100 yd (91 m)	One home and two mobile homes were destroyed, while a supermarket and a motel were damaged. Three people were injured.
F0	N of De Soto	Jackson	IL	37.85°N 89.2667°W	19:32–19:40	9 mi (14 km)	100 yd (91 m)	Minor shingle damage to a barn and trees were also damaged.
F0	W of West Frankfort	Franklin	IL	37.8833°N 89.1167°W	19:41–19:42	0.5 mi (0.80 km)	50 yd (46 m)	Damage was limited to trees.
F0	S of Bluffton	Wells	IN	40.6167°N 85.1333°W	19:46	1 mi (1.6 km)	100 yd (91 m)	Two outbuildings were damaged.
F3	NE of Berne	Adams	IN	40.6667°N 84.9167°W	19:59–20:05	5 mi (8.0 km)	200 yd (180 m)	Several well-built Amish homes and barns were severely damaged along the path. A mobile home was destroyed as well.
F4	SW of Van Wert to SE of Napoleon	Van Wert, Paulding, Putnam, Defiance, Henry	OH	40.7833°N 84.7667°W	20:15–21:25	52.8 mi (85.0 km)	880 yd (800 m)	4 deaths – See article on this tornado – 17 people were injured.
F3	E of Bellefontaine	Logan, Union	OH	40.35°N 83.55°W	21:38–21:49	9 mi (14 km)	300 yd (270 m)	In Logan County, two semi-trailers were damaged along with the roof of shed. In Union County, four houses were destroyed and nine others were damaged. Several barns and vehicles were destroyed as well. A metal high-tension truss tower was toppled and two people were injured.
F1	W of Richwood	Union	OH	40.4333°N 83.4°W	21:51–21:53	0.5 mi (0.80 km)	200 yd (180 m)	A barn and a house were damaged.
F1	Jerry City	Wood	OH	41.25°N 83.6167°W	21:54–22:01	4.5 mi (7.2 km)	50 yd (46 m)	Three garages, one barn, and a city maintenance garage were destroyed in and around Jerry City. Nine homes were also damaged, including one home that was moved off of its foundation. Vehicles were destroyed and hundreds of trees were downed.
F2	Fostoria	Hancock, Seneca	OH	41.1167°N 83.5°W	21:57–22:10	9 mi (14 km)	50 yd (46 m)	Eight homes were destroyed and many others severely damaged as the tornado moved through the city. One fertilizer plant southwest of town was completely destroyed. Two businesses were heavily damaged and several barns were either destroyed or damaged as well. Two railroad cars were blown over and derailed, and a storage tank was also damaged. Also in Fostoria, the hospital sustained damage while at the airport, an administrative building and a hangar were damaged. The tornado left cycloidal marks in farm fields outside of town.
F0	Marion	Marion	OH	40.5833°N 83.1333°W	22:10	0.1 mi (0.16 km)	25 yd (23 m)	Damage was limited to trees.
F0	SE of Perrysburg	Wood	OH	41.5167°N 83.5167°W	22:10	0.1 mi (0.16 km)	25 yd (23 m)	Law enforcement officers reported a brief tornado; it did not cause damage.
F3	SE of Tiffin to Fireside	Seneca	OH	41.1°N 83.1667°W	22:15–22:38	21 mi (34 km)	100 yd (91 m)	1 death – A strong tornado touched down near Tiffin and moved into the town, resulting in major damage, especially in the Honey Creek subdivision. A total of 8 homes in Tiffin were destroyed, 5 were heavily damaged, and 25 others sustained lesser damage. A retirement community was also impacted and a business near Ohio State Route 231 was leveled. Near Republic, one person was killed when a house was swept off of its foundation, and other nearby houses were completely destroyed as well. Across Seneca County, a total of 32 homes and businesses were destroyed and nearly 80 others were damaged by this tornado. Hundreds of trees and power lines were downed, and dozens vehicles were damaged or destroyed. The tornado left cycloidal marks in farm fields. Two people were injured.
F1	NW of Millbury	Wood	OH	41.5667°N 83.4333°W	22:19–22:20	0.5 mi (0.80 km)	25 yd (23 m)	Five homes sustained roof damage.
F1	Fremont	Sandusky	OH	41.35°N 83.1167°W	22:20–22:25	3.5 mi (5.6 km)	50 yd (46 m)	Several homes had minor to moderate damage, while a motor home and seven barns were destroyed. Several antique cars inside a barn were also destroyed. Many trees and power lines were downed as well.
F0	NW of Macon	Bibb, Monroe	GA	32.9333°N 83.7333°W	22:21–22:24	0.8 mi (1.3 km)	50 yd (46 m)	Minor shingle damage to homes, although some homes were damaged by falling trees.
F2	Port Clinton	Ottawa	OH	41.5167°N 82.95°W	22:30–22:45	10 mi (16 km)	50 yd (46 m)	Major damage occurred throughout Port Clinton. A total of 24 homes and 16 apartments were destroyed while 140 others structures were damaged, some of them significantly. Two condominiums were blown off of their stilts into Lake Erie. The Port Clinton hospital and high school were also damaged, and hundreds of trees and power poles were downed. A total of 10 people were injured.
F1	W of Norwalk to Milan	Huron, Erie	OH	41.2167°N 82.7667°W	22:42–22:50	12.5 mi (20.1 km)	50 yd (46 m)	A few barns were destroyed while a few homes also sustained damaged. The Lyme Township hall was heavily damaged as well, as its garage and several trucks and heavy equipment inside were destroyed. A high-voltage power pole was toppled, and many trees were downed as well.
F1	SW of Ontario	Richland	OH	40.75°N 82.6333°W	22:45–22:46	1 mi (1.6 km)	25 yd (23 m)	A cinder block building was leveled and there was extensive damage to one home. Hand tools from the cinder block building were found impaled into a nearby car. Many trees were downed along the path.
F2	SW of Polk to NE of Homerville	Ashland, Medina	OH	40.95°N 82.2167°W	22:48–23:05	9.5 mi (15.3 km)	50 yd (46 m)	A total of 5 homes were destroyed along the path, and about 40 others were damaged as well, with additional damage to other structures. A couple of public buildings were damaged in Polk, and two homes in town were heavily damaged as well. A church outside of town lost its steeple, and a small boat left tethered in a pond was found a quarter-mile away. In Medina County, an auto shop and a barn were destroyed in Homerville. Several homes in town sustained minor to moderate damage, and many cars were damaged as well. Dozens of trees were also downed along the path, and four people were injured.
F0	St. George Island	Franklin	FL	29.6667°N 84.8167°W	23:15	0.1 mi (0.16 km)	50 yd (46 m)	A waterspout moved onshore, causing damage to an unoccupied home.
F2	SE of West Salem	Wayne	OH	40.9667°N 82.1°W	23:20–23:27	5 mi (8.0 km)	100 yd (91 m)	Two homes were destroyed, and three others were severely damaged. Several other homes had minor damage, and outbuildings were destroyed. Twenty power poles were snapped, many vehicles were damaged, and hundreds of trees were downed along the path.
F1	Massillon	Stark	OH	40.7833°N 81.55°W	23:26–23:32	3.3 mi (5.3 km)	25 yd (23 m)	A tornado moved through downtown Massillon, causing roof and window damage to several businesses. A semi-truck and several large signs were blown over in this area as well. Many cars, including one with a board driven through its door, were damaged or destroyed by trees and flying debris in this same area. A total of 23 properties sustained either roof and siding damage or downed trees on List Street alone.
F0	N of Sunbright	Morgan	TN	36.3333°N 84.7°W	23:35–23:37	1.5 mi (2.4 km)	25 yd (23 m)	Damage was limited to trees.
F0	SE of Milan	Carroll	TN	35.85°N 88.6667°W	23:40–23:42	0.3 mi (0.48 km)	33 yd (30 m)	Damage was limited to trees.
F1	SW of Huntsville	Scott	TN	36.3333°N 84.6333°W	23:40–23:45	4.1 mi (6.6 km)	50 yd (46 m)	Several homes were damaged.
F1	N of Manchester	Coffee	TN	35.55°N 86.16°W	23:32–?	4.1 mi (6.6 km)	50 yd (46 m)	Damage was limited to trees. The National Centers for Environmental Information erroneously lists the details of this tornado.
F1	SE of Huntsville	Scott	TN	36.3833°N 84.45°W	23:50–23:54	4.2 mi (6.8 km)	50 yd (46 m)	A total of 24 homes, 6 mobile homes, 1 modular home, and 1 business were damaged. Three of the mobile homes were destroyed.
F0	N of Medon	Madison	TN	35.4667°N 88.8833°W	23:55–23:57	0.3 mi (0.48 km)	66 yd (60 m)	A barn was destroyed. A mobile home and a tavern were damaged.
F2	Macedonia to Twinsburg to Solon	Summit, Cuyahoga	OH	41.3167°N 81.5°W	00:00–00:15	7.3 mi (11.7 km)	100 yd (91 m)	A strong tornado touched down in Macedonia, damaging 60 homes; of these structures, 2 homes were completely destroyed and 15 were declared uninhabitable. The tornado then caused major damage in Twinsburg, where 45 homes were damaged and a few were leveled in a single subdivision. The tornado then clipped the south edge of Glenwillow, where a business lost its roof and a few homes were damaged. Past Glenwillow, the tornado struck Solon before dissipating, where many additional homes were damaged and a middle school sustained $2 million in roof and structural damage. Multiple cars were damaged, and hundreds of trees and power poles were downed along the path.
F2	SE of Wartrace	Bedford, Coffee	TN	35.48°N 86.30°W	00:45–?	13.10 mi (21.08 km)	500 yd (460 m)	2 deaths – A strong tornado destroyed 24 houses and 9 mobile homes. Another 51 houses, 5 mobile homes, and 14 outbuildings were damaged. Two deaths occurred in a mobile home. A Tennessee Valley Authority tower was destroyed, trees and light poles were downed, and two loaded tractor-trailers were blown off of I-24. Twenty-four people were injured. The National Centers for Environmental Information erroneously lists the details of this tornado.
F3	N of Fayette to S of Arley	Fayette, Walker, Winston	AL	33.75°N 87.8667°W	00:52–01:45	44.3 mi (71.3 km)	1,175 yd (1,074 m)	4 deaths – A significant tornado struck Carbon Hill, resulting in severe damage. Carbon Hill Elementary and Carbon Hill Junior High School were heavily damaged, and many trees were downed along the path. Homes were completely leveled or swept away at Lewis Smith Lake, and three of the fatalities occurred in Rose Hill. The tornado damaged or destroyed approximately 47 structures in Fayette County, 135 structures in Walker County, and 35 structures in Winston County. A total of 38 people were injured.
F2	Clark	Mercer	PA	41.25°N 80.4667°W	00:54–01:02	7 mi (11 km)	500 yd (460 m)	1 death – A strong tornado touched down outside of Sharpsville and struck Clark. In all, 15 homes were destroyed while 42 homes sustained minor to major damage. One business was destroyed, and another one was damaged.
F1	Crab Orchard	Cumberland	TN	35.92°N 84.93°W	01:01–?	3.4 mi (5.5 km)	400 yd (370 m)	A tractor trailer was blown onto its side at I-40 in Crab Orchard. The National Centers for Environmental Information erroneously lists the details of this tornado.
F3	SE of Artesia, MS to NW of Fernbank, AL	Lowndes (MS), Lamar (AL)	MS, AL	33.3833°N 88.6167°W	01:08–01:42	29.4 mi (47.3 km)	440 yd (400 m)	A total of 60 homes were heavily damaged in Columbus, Mississippi, and several buildings at the Mississippi University for Women and the Mississippi School for Mathematics and Science were heavily damaged as well. In Alabama, numerous tree were downed, a house was unroofed, headstones were damaged, and vehicles were flipped. In the end, 55 people were injured.
F1	W of West Union	Adams	OH	38.8°N 83.6°W	01:15–01:20	1.3 mi (2.1 km)	50 yd (46 m)	One barn was destroyed while a church, three barns, and two homes were damaged.
F1	N of Webster, MS to NE of Stafford, AL	Winston (MS), Noxubee (MS), Oktibbeha (MS), Lowndes (MS), Pickens (AL)	MS, AL	33.2167°N 88.95°W	01:20–02:18	51 mi (82 km)	400 yd (370 m)	1 death – A long-tracked tornado passed near Crawford, Mississippi. Damage in Alabama was limited to trees, but several homes were destroyed in Mississippi.
F0	N of Liberty	Casey	KY	37.4°N 84.95°W	01:30–01:31	0.1 mi (0.16 km)	25 yd (23 m)	Damage was limited to trees.
F1	Cochranton	Crawford	PA	41.5167°N 80.05°W	01:30–01:33	1 mi (1.6 km)	40 yd (37 m)	A barn and a cottage were destroyed, while three homes and a barn were damaged. Hundreds of trees were snapped.
F2	E of Pickens	Attala, Leake	MS	32.9°N 89.8333°W	01:30–01:40	10 mi (16 km)	1,000 yd (910 m)	One home and a barn were damaged, and hundreds of trees were snapped and uprooted.
F3	NW of Oliver Springs	Morgan	TN	36.0333°N 84.6°W	01:31–01:42	8.3 mi (13.4 km)	300 yd (270 m)	7 deaths – The communities of Mossy Grove and Joyner were devastated. A total of 24 homes were destroyed, and 63 others were damaged. A total of 12 mobile homes were destroyed, and 18 others were damaged as well. Severe tree damage occurred and vehicles were thrown. A total of 28 people were injured.
F1	N of New Hope, MS	Lowndes (MS), Pickens (AL)	MS, AL	33.45°N 88.3333°W	01:36–01:48	9.5 mi (15.3 km)	400 yd (370 m)	Damage in both states was limited to trees.
F0	SE of Hustonville	Lincoln	KY	37.4333°N 84.7833°W	01:45–01:46	0.1 mi (0.16 km)	25 yd (23 m)	Damage was limited to trees.
F2	S of Lake City	Anderson	TN	36.2°N 84.2°W	01:54–02:05	5.5 mi (8.9 km)	75 yd (69 m)	A total of 32 homes were damaged, of which 3 were completely destroyed; 9 mobile homes were damaged as well.
F2	N of Spencer	Van Buren	TN	35.73°N 85.47°W	02:10–02:14	2.9 mi (4.7 km)	100 yd (91 m)	A frame house was destroyed. The National Centers for Environmental Information erroneously lists the path of this tornado.
F3	NE of Fayette to E of Cullman	Fayette, Walker, Winston, Cullman	AL	33.7667°N 87.8°W	02:15–03:52	72.6 mi (116.8 km)	1,175 yd (1,074 m)	7 deaths – Close to 500 structures were damaged or destroyed and hundreds of trees were downed by this long-tracked tornado. The worst damage occurred in the Saragossa community. Unanchored homes were swept away and vehicles were thrown and mangled. A total of 40 people were injured.
F1	S of Louisville	Winston	MS	33.05°N 89.05°W	02:20–02:40	15 mi (24 km)	500 yd (460 m)	Two mobile homes were destroyed while several homes and outbuildings were damaged. Numerous trees were snapped and uprooted.
F1	NW of Pikeville	Bledsoe	TN	35.7333°N 85.2667°W	02:30–02:38	6.2 mi (10.0 km)	100 yd (91 m)	Five homes were damaged.
F1	SE of Canton	Madison	MS	32.55°N 89.95°W	02:34–02:36	2 mi (3.2 km)	50 yd (46 m)	Damage was limited to trees.
F0	S of Crossville (1st tornado)	Cumberland	TN	35.8°N 85.0167°W	02:46–02:47	0.1 mi (0.16 km)	20 yd (18 m)	Weak tornado with no damage.
F1	SE of Berry	Fayette	AL	33.6167°N 87.5333°W	03:10–03:15	4.3 mi (6.9 km)	90 yd (82 m)	A lumber mill and a mobile home were damaged. Numerous trees were downed as well.
F1	Dora	Walker	AL	33.7°N 87.15°W	03:38–03:47	4.3 mi (6.9 km)	300 yd (270 m)	Several structures in Dora were damaged, including roofs of homes.
F3	S of Crossville (2nd tornado)	Cumberland	TN	35.86°N 85.13°W	03:33–?	12.2 mi (19.6 km)	900 yd (820 m)	4 deaths – 33 homes and mobile homes were destroyed, and 128 others were damaged. One public building was also damaged. Many trees were snapped and uprooted, and power lines were downed as well. All the fatalities occurred inside mobile homes. The National Centers for Environmental Information erroneously lists the details of this tornado.
F1	S of Allgood	Blount, Etowah	AL	33.9°N 86.5167°W	04:22–04:32	10.6 mi (17.1 km)	300 yd (270 m)	Several structures were damaged and two cows were killed by falling trees.
F2	N of Abernant to Bessemer	Tuscaloosa, Jefferson	AL	33.3167°N 87.2333°W	04:22–04:43	15.2 mi (24.5 km)	450 yd (410 m)	This tornado struck North Johns and Sumter before dissipating in Bessemer. A manufacturing facility was heavily damaged. Several homes and businesses sustained varying degree of damage as well. A crane was toppled at a quarry in Bessemer.
F1	N of Steele	St. Clair	AL	33.95°N 86.25°W	04:41–04:44	3.2 mi (5.1 km)	50 yd (46 m)	Three homes were damaged, along with a few outbuildings. Trees were downed as well.
F2	SE of Centre	Cherokee	AL	34.1167°N 85.6333°W	05:20–05:32	10.5 mi (16.9 km)	440 yd (400 m)	1 death – 88 homes were damaged or destroyed. Many trees were downed and outbuildings were destroyed. The fatality occurred in a mobile home. Four people were injured.

=== November 11 event ===
List of confirmed tornadoes – Monday, November 11, 2002
F#	Location	County / Parish	State	Start Coord.	Time (UTC)	Path length	Max width	Summary
F2	S of Adairsville	Bartow	GA	34.3°N 84.9833°W	06:35	1.3 mi (2.1 km)	50 yd (46 m)	Seven chicken houses and a barn were destroyed, killing 7,500 chickens. About 15 homes were damaged as well.
F2	W of Dawsonville	Cherokee, Pickens, Dawson	GA	34.35°N 84.5833°W	06:48–07:25	23 mi (37 km)	100 yd (91 m)	A total of 28 homes, 2 mobile homes, 2 businesses and several other structures were destroyed. Over 150 other homes and 2 churches sustained varying levels of damage. Several livestock were killed and 13 people were injured, including 3 at a popular restaurant.
F1	S of Columbia	Marion	MS	31.0833°N 89.8167°W	06:50–07:00	4 mi (6.4 km)	25 yd (23 m)	One mobile home was destroyed, while another mobile home and house were damaged.
F1	NW of Covington	St. Tammany	LA	30.5333°N 90.2333°W	06:55	0.3 mi (0.48 km)	150 yd (140 m)	Three homes and a few outbuildings were damaged.
F0	S of Piedmont	Anderson, Greenville	SC	34.6833°N 82.4833°W	10:22–10:27	6 mi (9.7 km)	50 yd (46 m)	Damage was limited to trees.
F1	S of Simpsonville	Greenville	SC	34.7167°N 82.2667°W	10:30–10:34	4 mi (6.4 km)	100 yd (91 m)	One hotel sustained extensive damage to its roof, while outbuildings, a scoreboard, and fences were destroyed. Other structures sustained damage and two tractor trailers were blown over.
F0	NW of Troy	McCormick	SC	34.0°N 82.4833°W	10:45–10:55	9 mi (14 km)	100 yd (91 m)	Damage was limited to trees, though two people were injured by a tree that crushed a vehicle.
F0	NW of Lincolnton	Lincoln	GA	33.9°N 82.5667°W	11:15–11:17	1 mi (1.6 km)	50 yd (46 m)	Damage was limited to trees.
F0	S of Willington	McCormick	SC	33.9333°N 82.4833°W	11:20–11:25	5 mi (8.0 km)	100 yd (91 m)	Damage to trees and power lines.
F1	W of Newberry	Newberry	SC	34.2667°N 81.7667°W	11:42–11:44	1.5 mi (2.4 km)	100 yd (91 m)	Damage to trees and power lines.
F1	N of Little Mountain	Newberry	SC	34.23°N 81.4167°W	12:35–12:37	1.2 mi (1.9 km)	100 yd (91 m)	A few homes sustained minor damage and a shed was blown down.

=== Van Wert–Roselms, Ohio ===
Van Wert–Roselms, Ohio
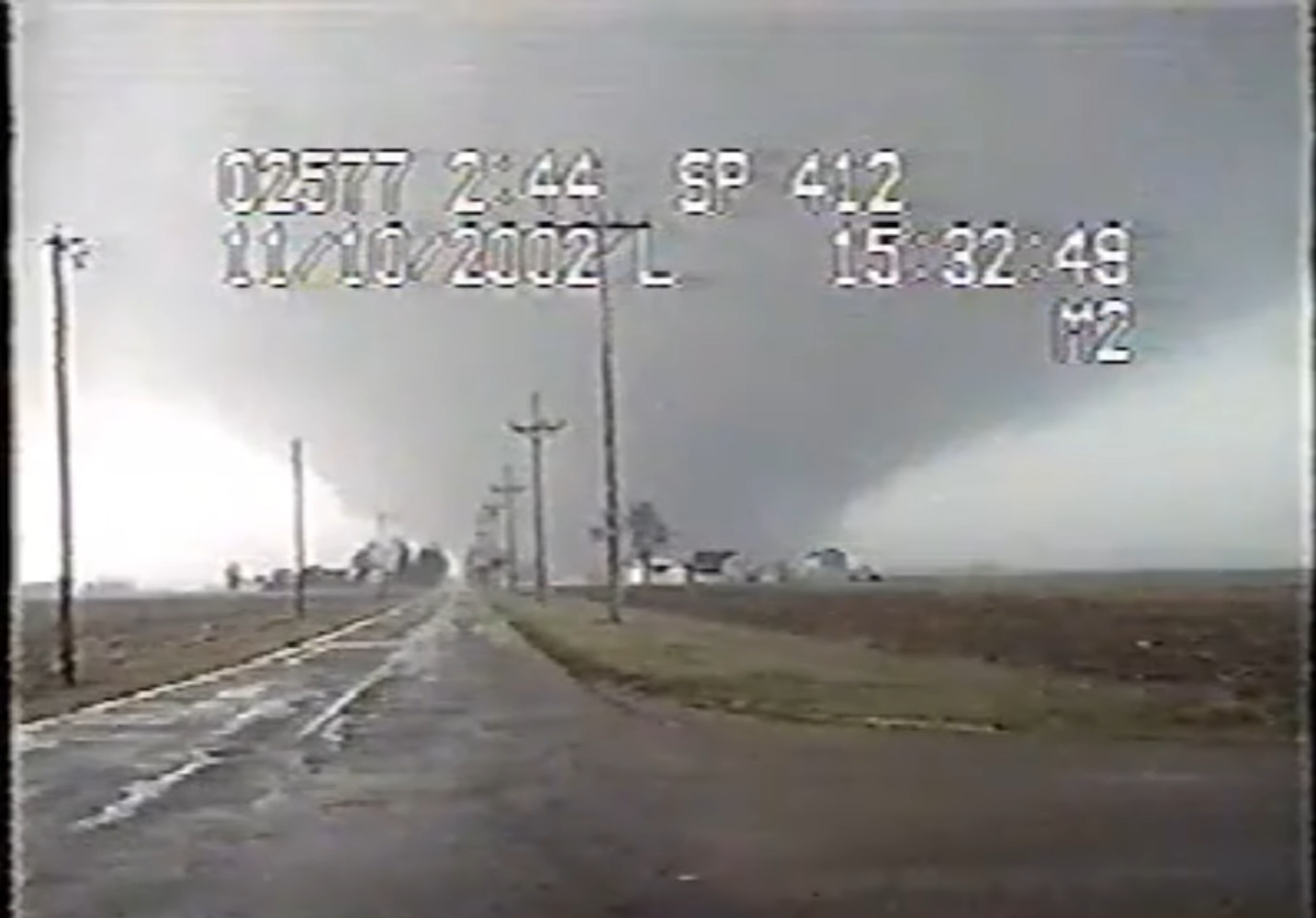
- The tornado captured by Ohio Highway Patrol

Meteorological history
- Formed: November 10, 3:15 p.m. EST (UTC−05:00)
- Dissipated: November 10, 4:25 p.m. EST (UTC−05:00)
- Duration: 1 hour, 10 minutes

F4 tornado
- on the Fujita scale
- Highest winds: 207–260 mph (333–418 km/h)

Overall effects
- Fatalities: 4
- Injuries: 17
- Damage: >$30 million (2002 USD)

On November 10, a violent tornado struck the city of Van Wert and the community of Roselms in Ohio. The National Weather Service rated the worst of the damage F4 on the Fujita scale, with several homes and businesses sustaining F4 damage in the city of Van Wert. The tornado touched down approximately four miles (6.4 km) northeast of the village of Willshire, Ohio in Van Wert County and began moving northeast towards the city of Van Wert. Right after touching down, the tornado rapidly intensified to F4 intensity as it crossed Zook Road approximately five miles (8.0 km) southwest of Van Wert. Around Zook Road, a 75-year-old man was killed when the tornado destroyed his house at F4 intensity. The National Weather Service documented that he was attempting to shield his wheelchair-using wife when the tornado struck. As the tornado continued into Van Wert, it maintained F4 intensity. In Van Wert, 43 homes and five businesses were destroyed and 164 homes and 27 businesses were damaged. The Twin Cinemas and the five buildings in the Vision Industrial Park sustained F4 damage. In the Twin Cinemas, 60 people, mostly children, were inside watching a movie when the tornado destroyed the building. Vehicles from the cinema parking lot were thrown into the seats of the cinema. An 18-year-old was killed after driving near the cinema and having his car thrown into the cinema seats. Three county engineering buildings were also destroyed by the tornado in Van Wert. After passing through the Vision Industrial Park, several homes and business in Van Wert sustained F3 to F4 damage.

The tornado continued northeast out of Van Wert and crossed into Paulding County, where it struck the community of Roselms. Only one building remained standing in Roselms after the tornado. Every structure in Roselms sustained up to F3 damage, and the entire nine-mile (14 km) track of the tornado through Paulding County was rated F3 by the National Weather Service. The Dayton Daily Newspaper reported that in Paulding County, 23 homes, 32 barns, and a church were completely leveled and 19 additional homes were damaged. The Washington Township building was also leveled by the tornado. The tornado continued northeast at F3 intensity as it crossed into Putnam County. In Putnam County, the tornado destroyed a mobile home in Continental, killing a man and his wife. After traveling seven miles (11 km) through the county, the tornado rapidly weakened to F0 intensity just before it crossed into Defiance County. While traveling three miles (4.8 km) through Defiance County, the tornado skipped and caused F0 damage to five homes and some outbuildings before crossing into Henry County. In Henry County, the tornado continued to skip and caused F0 damage to outbuildings and trees along a path of 12 miles (19 km). The tornado lifted approximately two miles (3.2 km) southeast of Malinta.

In total, the tornado killed four people and injured 17 others along a path of 53 miles (85 km), while reaching a peak width of 880 yards (800 m). The tornado caused at least $30 million (2002 USD) in damage just in the city of Van Wert.

The National Oceanic and Atmospheric Administration later stated that out of the entire tornado outbreak, which included a total of 76 tornadoes, the Van Wert–Roselms tornado was the most remembered, due to "the heroic efforts of [Scott Shaffer] at the Van Wert Cinemas. After hearing the tornado warning that was broadcast over the county's warning system, the manager led 60 patrons to interior hallways and restrooms. This was only a few minutes before the tornado destroyed the theater. Besides leveling the building, 3 cars were tossed into the seats that were previously occupied by moviegoers, many of which were children."

== Gallery ==
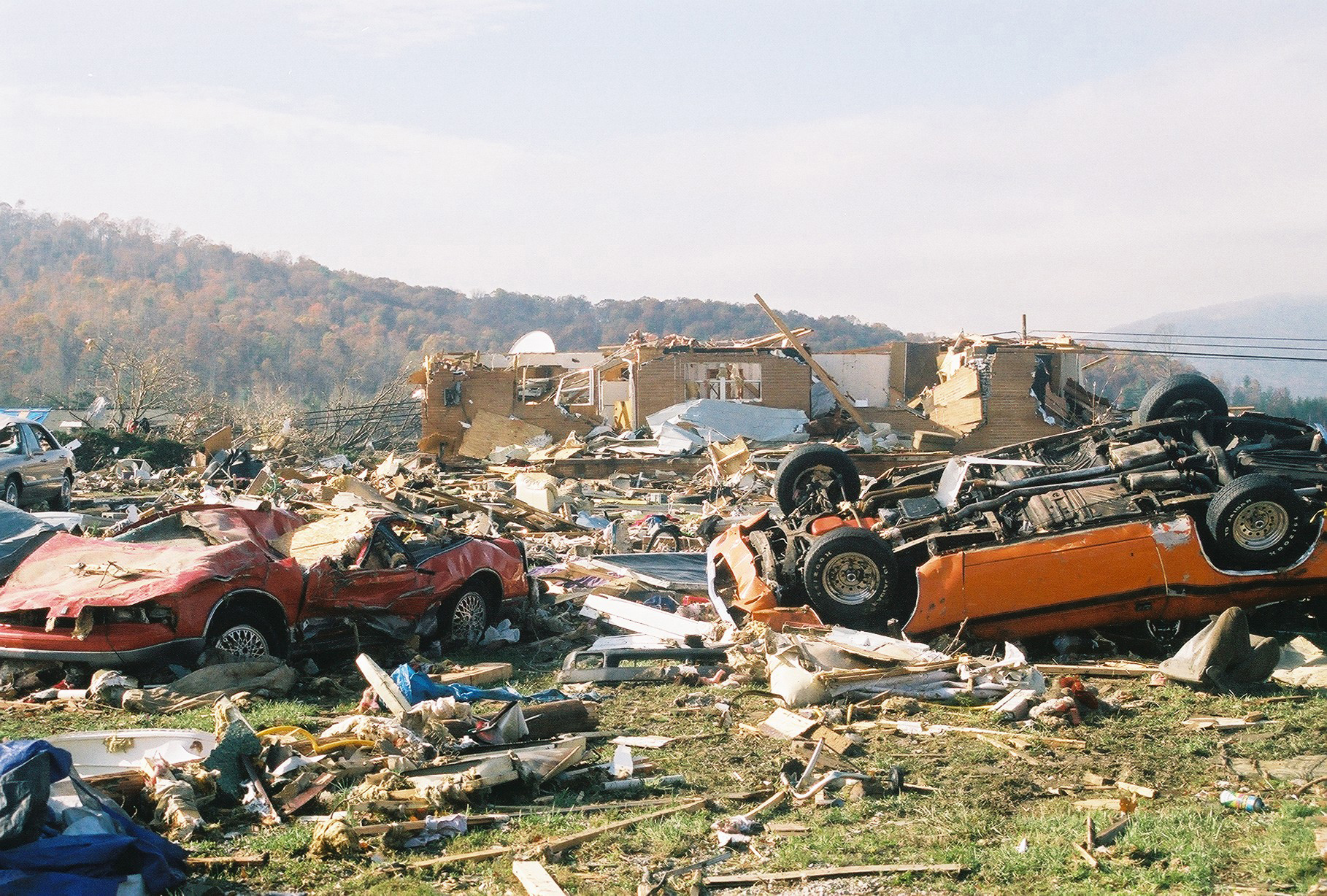
Mossy Grove, TN on November 12, 2002

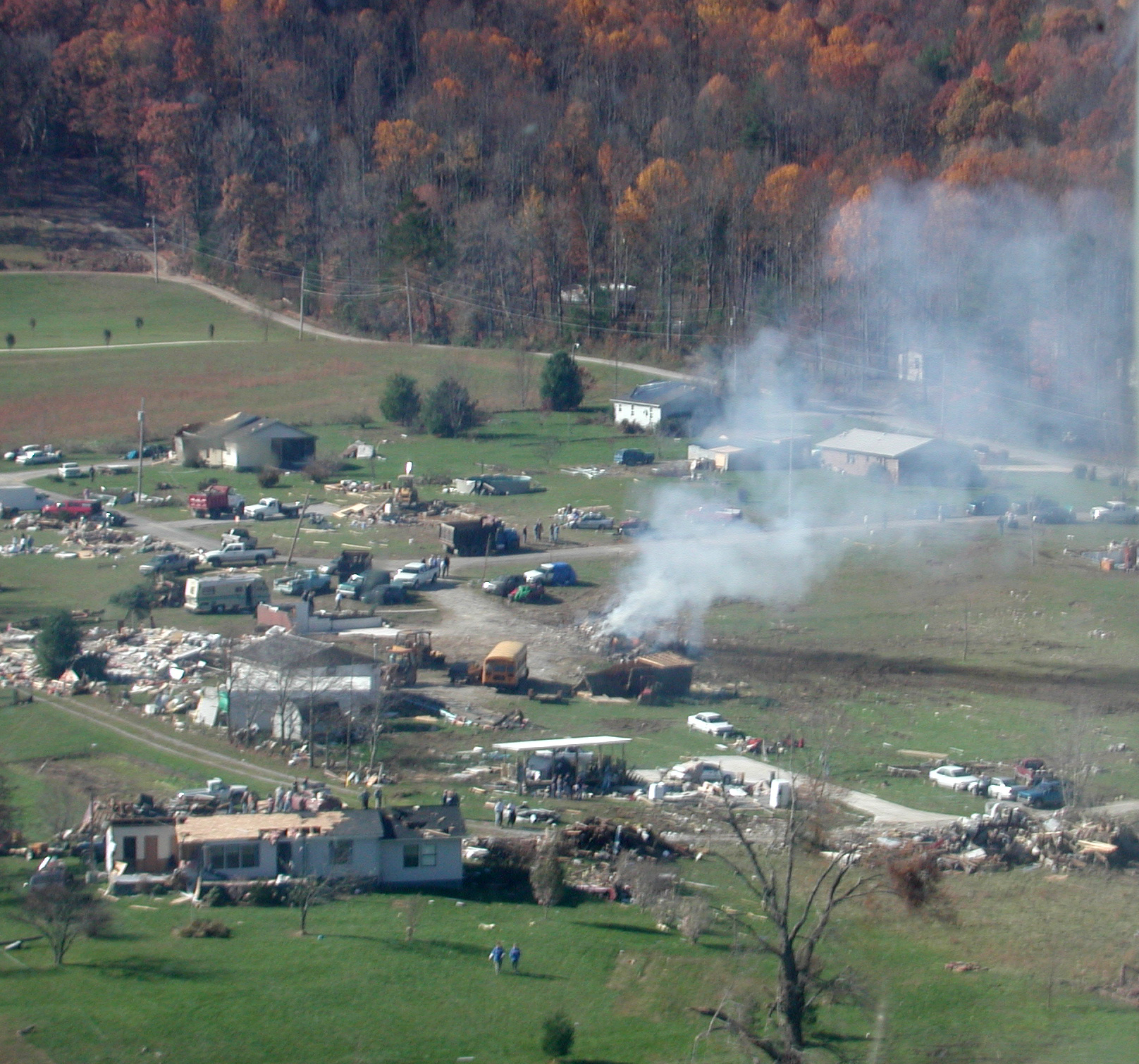
Carbon Hill, AL on November 14, 2002

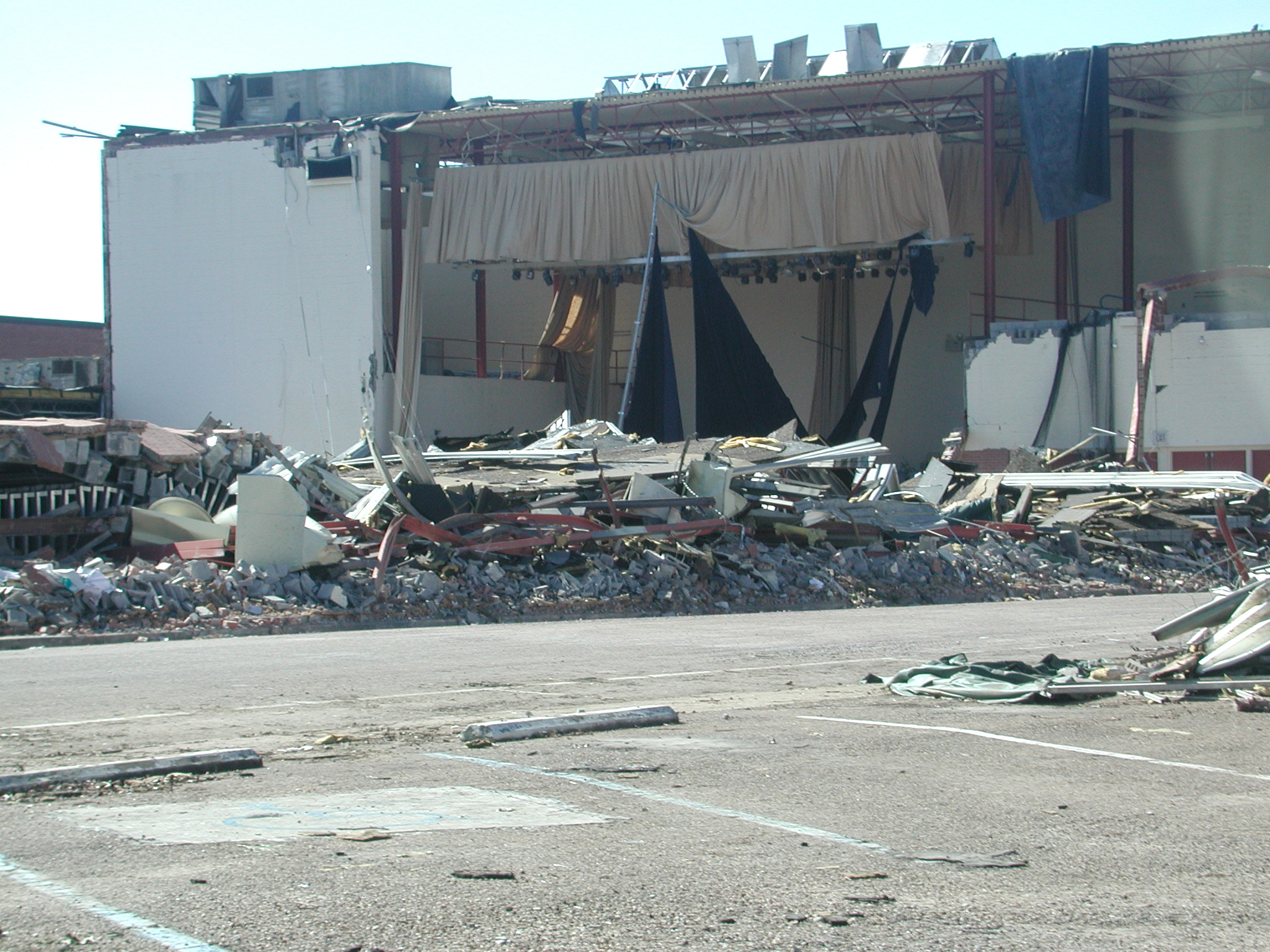
Mississippi University for Women campus, Columbus, MS on November 14, 2002

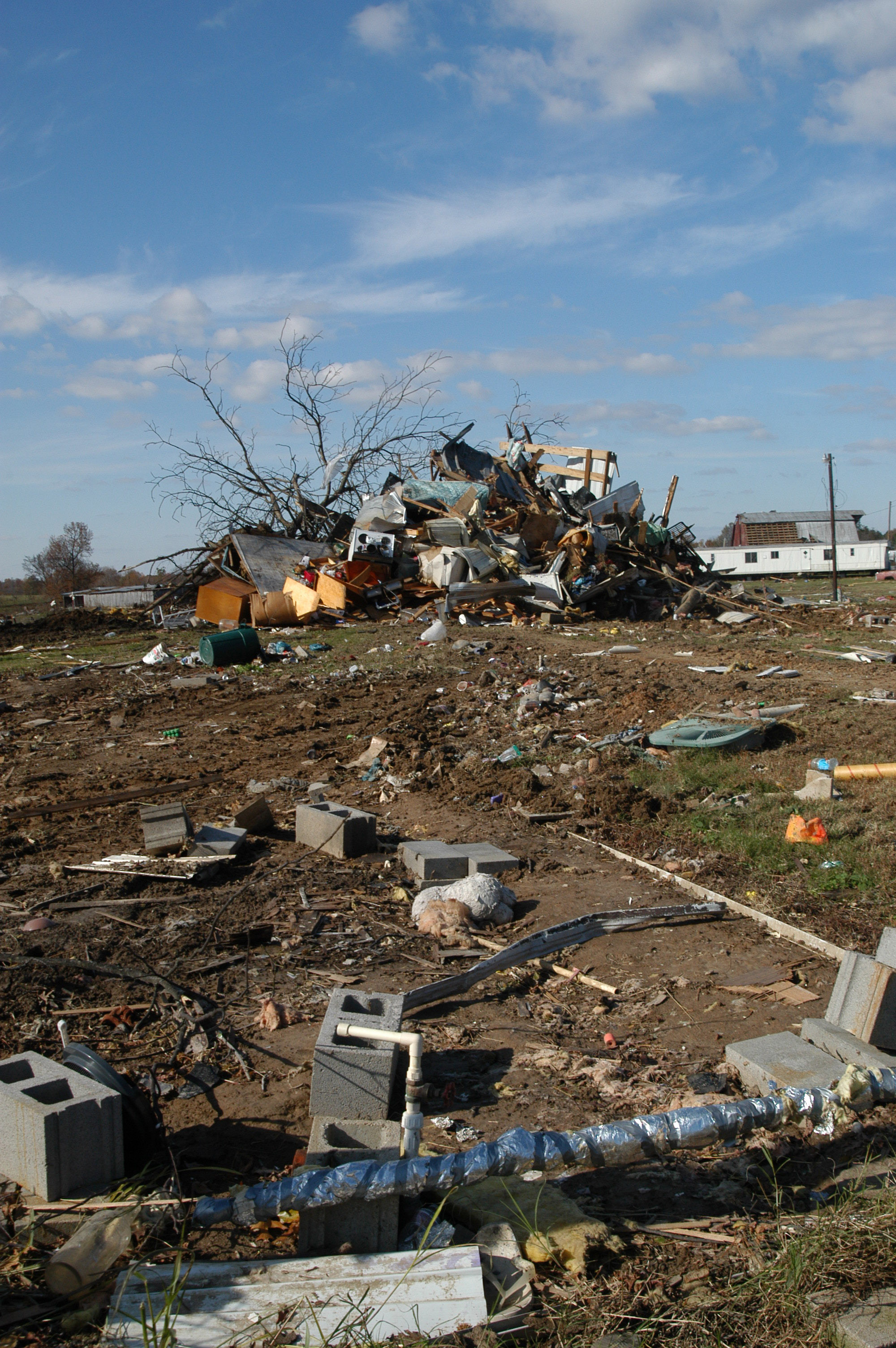
Burlison, TN on November 16, 2002

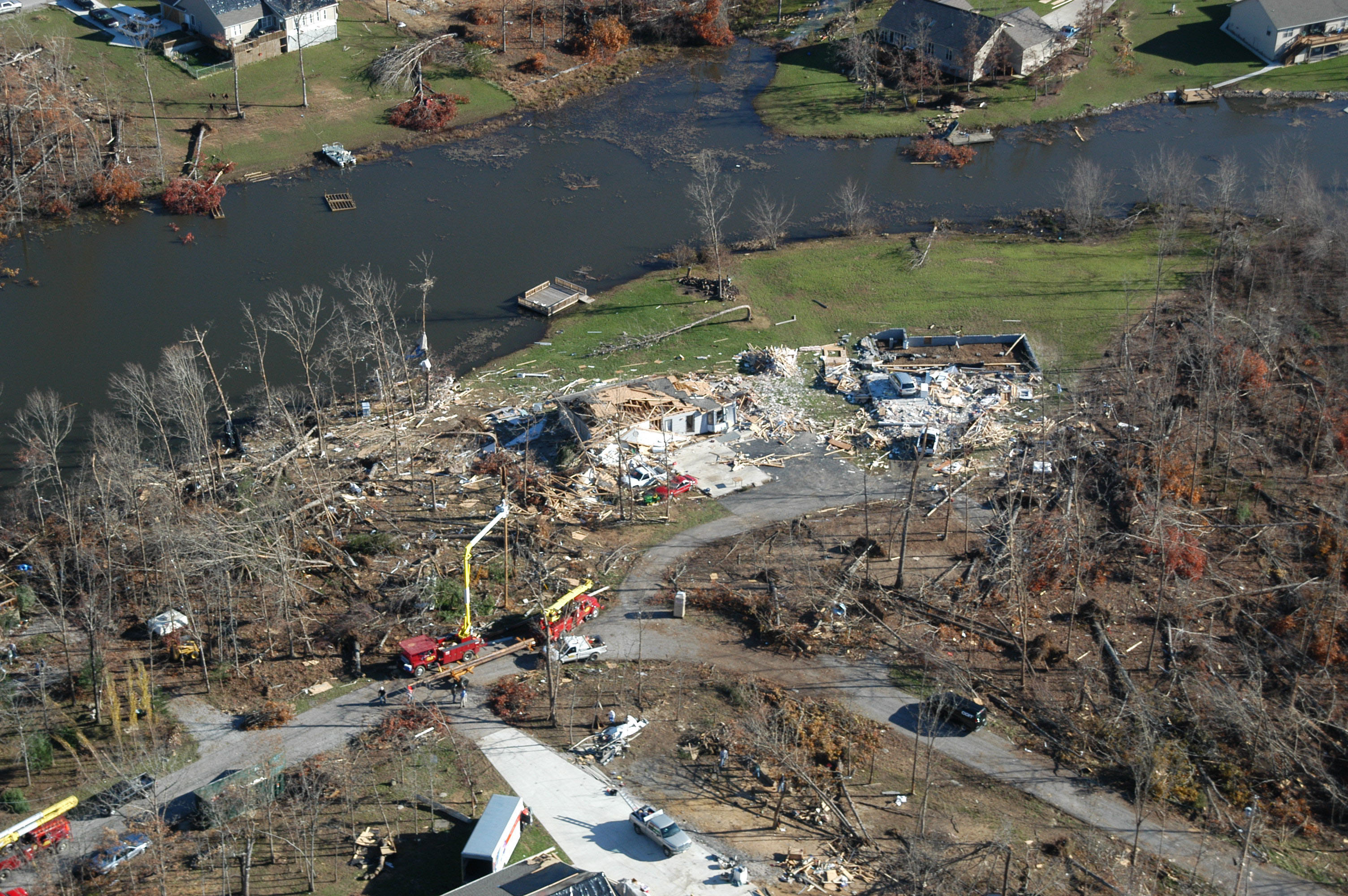
Cumberland County, TN on November 13, 2002

== See also ==
- Weather of 2002
- List of North American tornadoes and tornado outbreaks
- List of F4 and EF4 tornadoes
  - List of F4 and EF4 tornadoes (2000–2009)
- November 1989 tornado outbreak
- Tornado outbreak of November 14–16, 2006

== Notes ==
2. A 71 year old Briceville Volunteer Fire Department Firefighter in Anderson County, TN. Suffered a fatal heart attack while checking residences and clearing debris from roadways just after the storm passed.
