= Due West =

Due West may refer to:

- Due West, South Carolina
  - Due West Female College
  - Due West Railway
- Due West (band), American country band
- Due West (film), 2025 American film
- Due West: Our Sex Journey, 2012 Hong Kong film
