= New Acquisition =

Land disputed by Carolinas

Map from The Boundary Line Between North Carolina and South Carolina (Salley, 1929)

The New Acquisition is a section of land that had been disputed between North Carolina and South Carolina during the North American colonial period. Jurisdiction over the land between the Broad River and Catawba River was claimed by both of provinces. A boundary survey of land west of the Catawba was made in 1772, settling the dispute in favor of South Carolina. According to one account of the American Revolutionary War, the New Acquisition "consisted of those parts of the present counties of York, Cherokee and Spartanburg that lie north of the 35th degree of north latitude. In exchange therefor South Carolina gave a strip lying between the line of 1764 (north of Marlboro, Chesterfield and Lancaster counties) and the said 35th parallel of north latitude and east of the reservation of the Catawba Indians, and constituting portions of the present counties of Mecklenburg, Union, Anson, and Richmond."

American troops mustered and South Carolina Provincial Congress delegates elected from this area during the war were said to be from the New Acquisition District. The "New Acquisition" land was a 10 mile by 60 mile strip. According to a history of the border between the Carolinas, in 1785, "That portion of the New Acquisition which lay east of Broad River was included in the newly created county called York, of Camden District, and that part which lay west of Broad River was included in the newly created county called Spartanburg, of Ninety Six District, and thereafter the New Acquisition passed from the nomenclature of the state." York County has since been subdivided and some of the New Acquisition now lies within Cherokee County, South Carolina.

== See also ==
- The Waxhaws
- The Long Canes
- Tryon County, North Carolina
- Mecklenburg County, North Carolina
- Anson County, North Carolina
- List of South Carolina counties
- List of North Carolina counties
