= 2002 Van Wert–Roselms tornado =

2002 F4 tornado in Ohio, US

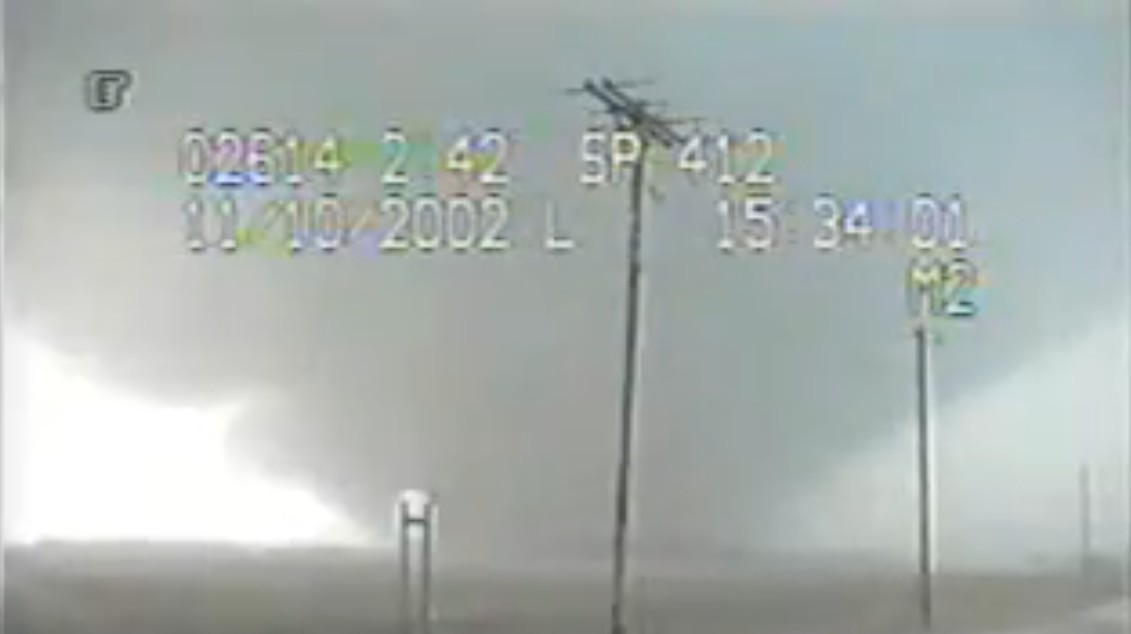
- The tornado, seen from an Ohio State Highway Patrol car

Meteorological history
- Formed: November 10, 2002, 3:15 p.m. EST (UTC−05:00)
- Dissipated: November 10, 2002, 4:25 p.m. EST (UTC−05:00)
- Duration: 1 hour, 10 minutes

F4 tornado
- on the Fujita scale
- Max width: 880 yards (0.50 mi; 0.80 km)
- Path length: 53 mi (85 km)
- Highest winds: 207–260 mph (333–418 km/h)

Overall effects
- Fatalities: 4
- Injuries: 17
- Damage: >$30 million (2002 USD)
- Areas affected: Van Wert and Roselms, Ohio, US
- Part of the 2002 Veterans Day weekend tornado outbreak and tornado outbreaks of 2002

On November 10, 2002, a violent and deadly tornado struck the city of Van Wert and the community of Roselms, Ohio, United States. The National Weather Service rated the worst of the damage F4 on the Fujita scale, near and within the Van Wert area. In Van Wert, hundreds of homes and businesses were damaged or destroyed, with several homes and businesses sustaining F4 damage. Among these businesses, a movie theater, was leveled by the tornado, but the sixty people attending the feature inside the theater survived. In Roselms, only one single structure was left standing. The tornado killed four people, injured seventeen others, and was credited for over $30 million in damages.

== Meteorological synopsis ==
The first signs for organized severe weather became apparent on November 7, when the Storm Prediction Center (SPC) outlined a Slight risk across portions of the mid-Mississippi and western Ohio River valleys valid for November 9. On that day, a powerful and negatively-tilted upper-level trough upwards of 150 kn (175 mph; 280 km/h) was observed driving east-southeastward toward the U.S. Central and Southern Plains. While a shortwave trough at the leading edge of this feature progressed across the Texas Panhandle, a surface area of low pressure resided across the Central and Northern Plains. Southerly flow associated with the cyclone prompted the northward advection of moisture from the Gulf of Mexico, with dewpoints rising into the lower 60s °F as far north as southern Illinois; this moisture promoted modest destabilization and mid-level convective available potential energy (CAPE) values from 500 to 1,000 J/kg. As the shortwave trough continued eastward, it aided in the formation of thunderstorms across northeastern Arkansas around 00:00 UTC. These storms resided in a strongly sheared environment, with storm relative helicity – a measure of the potential for cyclonic updrafts – around 800 m2/s2. Despite initial concern that the lower levels of the atmosphere were not quite as favorable, evening atmospheric soundings from Little Rock, Arkansas, and Memphis, Tennessee, showcased an extremely favorable environment for significant tornadoes. Clusters of supercells tracked from Arkansas into Tennessee over ensuing hours, and in fact, the persistence of these storms resulted in the formation of a weak outflow boundary that further enhanced the tornado threat. A total of 10 tornadoes occurred throughout the evening of November 9, including multiple strong tornadoes and one that killed two people near Huntingdon, Tennessee.

On November 10, the SPC warned of the potential for a significant tornado outbreak and/or widespread damaging wind episode across northeastern Mississippi, much of Tennessee, northwestern Alabama, and much of Kentucky, where the organization issued a High risk of severe weather. Morning upper-air analyses showed mid- to upper-level winds of 100–150 kn (115–175 mph; 185–280 km/h) across the southern Rocky Mountains, as well as an embedded shortwave trough moving east toward the Mississippi and Ohio River valleys. At the surface, a strong area of low pressure was positioned over Wisconsin and moving northeastward toward Ontario. Throughout the afternoon hours, the tornado outbreak unfolded in three distinct locations. To the north across Indiana and Ohio, temperatures rose into the lower 70s and dewpoints climbed into the mid-60s °F, supporting CAPE values of 1,000–2,000 J/kg. In addition, significant pressure falls in the region contributed to backed surface winds, aiding in favorable low-level shear profiles. Although storms in this region were initially congealed into a squall line ahead of a cold front, the presence of strong shear and dry air in the mid-levels supported the line's breakdown into supercells and bowing segments. Ahead of this activity, additional discrete supercells overspread much of Ohio owing to a prefrontal trough.

== Tornado summary ==
The tornado at peak width, seen from a Ohio State Highway Patrol Car

The tornado touched down approximately four miles (6.4 km) northeast of the village of Willshire, Ohio, and began moving northeast towards the city of Van Wert. Immediately after touching down, the tornado rapidly intensified to F4 on the Fujita scale as it crossed Zook Road approximately five miles (8.0 km) southwest of Van Wert. Around Zook Road, a 75-year-old man, Alfred Germann, was killed when the tornado destroyed his house at F4 intensity. According to the National Weather Service (NWS), he was attempting to shield his wheelchair-using wife when the tornado struck. As the tornado continued into Van Wert, it maintained F4 intensity. In Van Wert, 43 homes and five businesses were destroyed, and 164 homes and 27 businesses were damaged. The Twin Cinemas and five buildings at an industrial park sustained F4 damage. In Twin Cinemas, 60 people, mostly children, were watching a movie when the tornado destroyed the building. Vehicles from the cinema's parking lot were thrown into its seats. An 18-year-old man, Nicholas Mollenkopf, was killed when the car, which he had been driving near the cinema, was thrown into the cinema's seats. The tornado destroyed three county engineering buildings in Van Wert. After passing through the industrial park, several homes and business in Van Wert sustained F3-to-F4 damage.

After leaving Van Wert, the tornado continued northeast and crossed into Paulding County, where it struck the community of Roselms. Only one building in Roselms remained standing after the tornado. Every structure in Roselms sustained up to F3 damage, and the NWS entire nine-mile (14 km) track of the tornado through Paulding County was rated F3 by the NWS. According to Dayton Daily News, 23 homes, 32 barns, and a church in Paulding County were completely leveled, and 19 more homes were damaged. The tornado also leveled the Washington Township building, and continued northeast at F3 intensity as it crossed into Putnam County. In Putnam County, the tornado destroyed a mobile home in Continental, killing two people. After traveling seven miles (11 km) through the county, the tornado rapidly weakened to F0 intensity just before it crossed into Defiance County. While traveling three miles (4.8 km) through Defiance County, the tornado skipped, and caused F0 damage to five homes and some outbuildings before crossing into Henry County, where it continued to skip, and caused F0 damage to outbuildings and trees along a 12-mile (19 km) path. The tornado then lifted approximately two miles (3.2 km) southeast of Malinta.

In total, the tornado killed four people and injured seventeen others along its 53-mile (85 km) path, and reached a peak width of 880 yd (800 m). It caused at least $30 million (2002 USD) in damage in Van Wert.

== Impact and aftermath ==
The National Oceanic and Atmospheric Administration (NOAA) later stated that of the entire Veterans Day weekend tornado outbreak—which consisted of 76 tornadoes—the Van Wert–Roselms tornado was the most remembered due to:

the heroic efforts of [Scott Shaffer] at the Van Wert Cinemas. After hearing the tornado warning that was broadcasted over the county's warning system, the manager led sixty patrons to interior hallways and restrooms. This was only a few minutes before the tornado destroyed the theater. Besides leveling the building, three cars were tossed into the seats that were previously occupied by moviegoers, many of which were children.

Van Wert County EMA Director Rick McCoy was able to give the city a 26-minute lead time for the tornado by continuously running Van Wert's tornado sirens for 26 minutes. In the aftermath of this tornado, Van Wert County gave a NOAA Weather Radio to every business in the county.

== See also ==
- List of North American tornadoes and tornado outbreaks
