= Roselms, Ohio =

- Unincorporated community
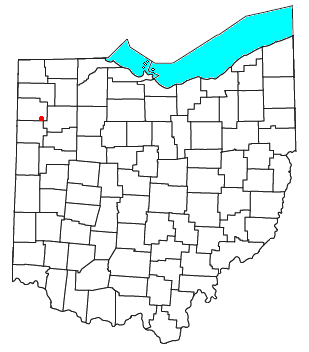
- Location of Roselms, Ohio
- Coordinates: 41°01′10″N 84°25′09″W
- Country: United States
- State: Ohio
- County: Paulding
- Township: Washington
- Elevation: 722 ft (220 m)
- Time zone: UTC-5 (Eastern (EST))
  - Summer (DST): UTC-4 (EDT)
- GNIS feature ID: 1045199

Roselms is an unincorporated community in southwestern Washington Township, Paulding County, Ohio, United States, in the northwestern part of the state. It lies along State Route 114 midway between Grover Hill and Mandale, about 3 miles (5 km) from each.

== History ==
Roselms was once the site of a post office. Established under the name of Plumbs Cross Roads on 28 January 1878, its name was changed to Roselms on 13 June 1892. The post office was closed on 14 June 1906, leaving Roselms residents with Grover Hill addresses.

On November 10, 2002, an F4 tornado ripped through the town, killing two people. Only one structure in town was left standing. This was one of many touchdowns during the Veterans Day Weekend Outbreak. Van Wert's emergency warning system is credited with saving many lives after several cars were thrown into a movie theater that had been packed with people just minutes earlier.

It has rich history in the areas of agriculture and mineral industries.
