= The Long Canes =

Historic human settlement, South Carolina

The Long Canes was a settlement in colonial South Carolina, established around 1756. It was located southwest of the Waxhaws colony. Both places were predominantly settled by Scots-Irish immigrants of the Presbyterian faith. The Long Canes settlement was in the Upcountry of South Carolina, centering on Long Cane Creek, a tributary of the Little River (itself a tributary of the Savannah River). In 1747, whites had traded ammunition valued at £189 to "the headmen of the Lower Towns...for the Cherokee lands between Long Canes and Ninety Six, defining the new boundary as extending along Long Cane Creek to its head, thence to the head of the nearest tributary of the Saluda, along that stream to the river, and from that point north to the Catawba-Cherokee path." The settlers of 1756 were five brothers Calhoun, Alexander Noble and wife (a Calhoun), John Luckey, and the Swearingin family. One of the brothers was the father of future U.S. Senator and Secretary of War John C. Calhoun. The Long Canes was the site of the Long Canes massacre of February 1, 1760, in which Cherokees attacked and killed and scalped a number of white squatters and their black slaves living there, at the cost of 21 of their own. There was another Cherokee attack in 1763, in which "fourteen people in one house" were killed. These events triggered two retaliatory campaigns by the British.

There was reportedly an attempt to raise silkworms at the Long Canes circa 1767.

The name "Long Canes" refers to a type of landscape common to the U.S. South, called a canebrake. The region is now part of the Long Cane Ranger District of Sumter National Forest.

== See also ==
- Long Cane Associate Reformed Presbyterian Church
