= Willie Kirkpatrick Lindsay =

American educator and temperance reformer (1875 – 1954)

Willie Kirkpatrick Lindsay (née Kirkpatrick; after first marriage, Douglas; after second marriage, Lindsay; 1875–1954) was an American educator and temperance reformer. She served as Dean of Women at Due West Female College (now Erskine College), and President of the North Carolina State Woman's Christian Temperance Union (WCTU).

== Early life and education ==
Willie Amanda Kirkpatrick was born in Mecklenburg County, North Carolina, September 27. 1875.

She was educated in the North Carolina public schools, at Due West Female College, and at Columbia University, New York City.

== Career ==
She was engaged in the teaching profession for thirteen years, during ten of which she was Dean of Women of the Due West Female College (1904–14).

Lindsay was actively associated with the temperance movement since childhood, having joined a Band of Hope when she was but ten years of age. She became affiliated with the WCTU of North Carolina, and was for two years editor of its official organ, the North Carolina White Ribbon. For a time, she served as corresponding secretary and still later, as president of the State Union.

Lindsay was a member of the Daughters of the American Revolution.

== Personal life ==
She married firstly, on November 3, 1897, James Calvin Douglas (1866–1900). They had one daughter. She married secondly, on June 25, 1913, Rev. William B. Lindsay (b. 1872), of Chester, South Carolina.

Willie Kirkpatrick Lindsay resided at Charlotte, North Carolina, where she died March 12, 1954.
