= Katherine Neel Dale =

American medical missionary

Katherine Neel Dale was an American medical missionary of the Associate Reformed Presbyterian Church who served in Mexico; primarily in the states of San Luis Potosí and Tamaulipas, specifically Rio Verde and Tampico regions. Katherine and her husband, James G. Dale, served the Mexican people for over forty years, where she built up an extended practice (treating up to 18,500 patients per year), founded and built Dale Memorial Hospital, and founded the Mexican Indian Mission - which included schools for Indian girls and boys.

== Early life and family ==
Katherine Neel was born on August 13, 1872, in Troy, South Carolina, the daughter of James Dale and Margaret Pressly Neel and the youngest of five siblings. Her grandfather was a physician of his day, as well as a pillar in the Associate Reformed Presbyterian Church. Her father, uncle, brother, and cousins were also physicians.

After a year and a half after opening her clinic in Ciudad del Maiz, Neel was married to J. G. Dale, who was that time studying the language in Rio Verde, San Louis Potosi. They had five children.

Neel's primary education was received in the schools near her home, and she graduated from Due West Female College, Due West, S.C. in 1892. The following year, she took a full course at the Women's Medical College, Philadelphia, Pa. After graduation she spent one year as Resident Physician in the hospital of same institution.

== Career ==
J. S. Moffatt, pastor of the Associate Reformed Presbyterian Church of Chester, South Carolina, called for volunteers for the world evangelization and Dale was one of about fifty young men and women who volunteered for a foreign mission field. Dale's pledge that night reads:

"Here am I, Lord, send me. Send me to the ends of the earth. Send me to the rough savage pagans of the wilderness. Send me away from all that is called comfort in the earth. Send me to death itself, if it be in Thy service and for Thy glory."

In 1893, Dale was appointed by the Missions Board to the Mexican Mission. She went to Ciudad del Maiz, San Luis Potosí, Mexico as a medical missionary of the Associate Reformed Presbyterian Church in 1898. She, with her spouse, primarily worked in Rio Verde area in San Luis Potosí where the hospital was built for the next 14 years. In April 1919, the Board of Foreign Missions directed the Dales to return to the mission field in Rio Verde. It was said that conditions had greatly improved after bandit forces roamed the city. However, as the Dales reached the Dale Memorial Hospital, it had been looted and all the furniture, medicines, and medical instruments taken away. In view of this, the Board decided to send them to Tampico to take over the field of which that city was the center. Following a furlough in the U.S., Dale returned to Tampico, Mexico in 1919 and practiced for 11 years both as religious missionary as part of the Associate Reformed Presbyterian Church and as a medical missionary.

In 1900 the Board of Foreign Missions sent the Dales to open a mission in Cerritos, a town in the state of San Luis Potosí, on the railroad from Tampico to San Luis Potosí. The following year the Mission and the Board decided to establish in Rio Verde an institution for the education of young men of the field, and for the training of men for the ministry where the Dale Family.

Five years after opening her work in Rio Verde, the Dale family of Oak Hill, Alabama, gave Dale the necessary funds to build a hospital. The building was named the Dale Memorial Hospital, in memory of William and Mary Dale, members of the Associate Reformed Presbyterian Church of Oak Hill, Alabama. It was a two-story building made of Mexican adobe or brick, costing three thousand Mexican dollars.

Dale opened a dormitory under the care and supervision of Christian women missionaries where the Mission would give the Indian girls room and board. The girls' dormitory was opened in Tamazunchale in 1940 with eighteen girls selected from representative Indian congregations. The following year there were twenty-one Indian congregations, and then in 1942 twenty-six.

== Death and burial ==
Katherine Neel Dale died on May 28, 1941, at age 68 in San Antonio, Texas. She was buried in Bethel Associate Reformed Presbyterian Church Cemetery in Oak Hill, Wilcox County, Alabama.
