= Tornadoes of 2002 =

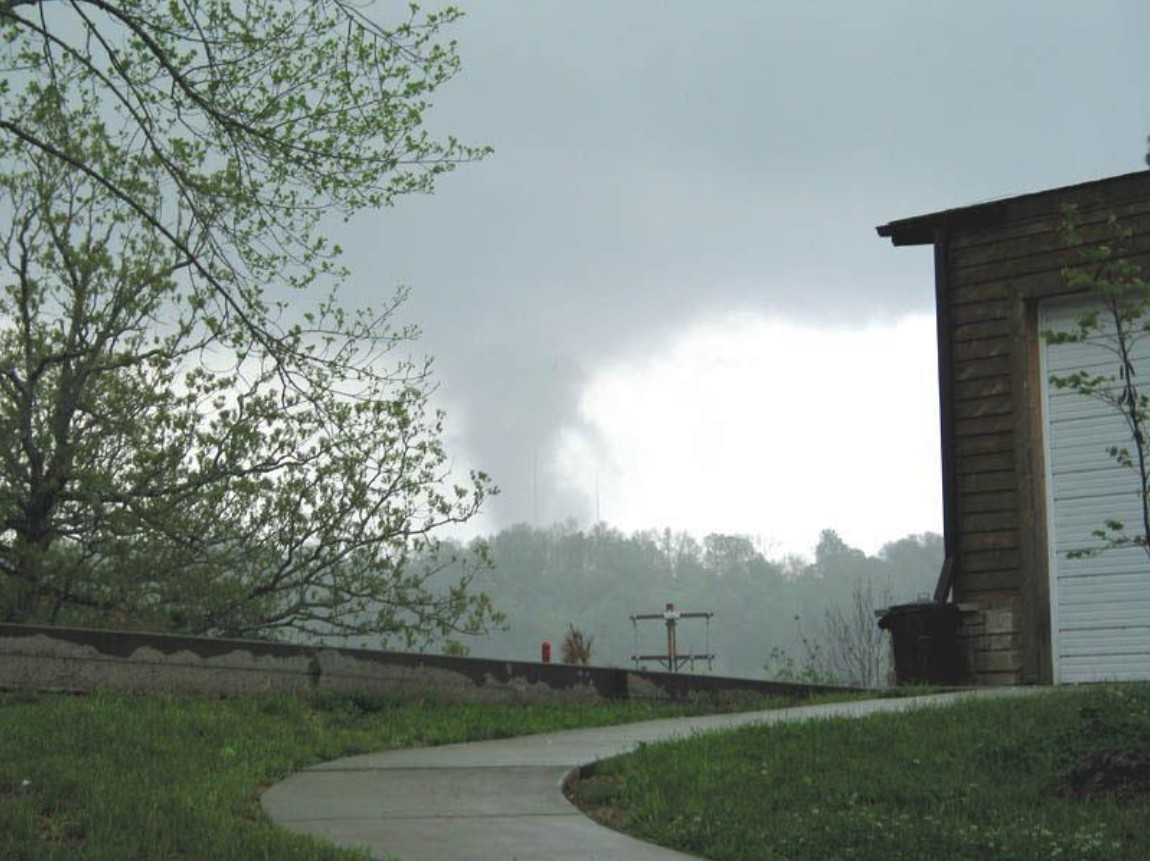
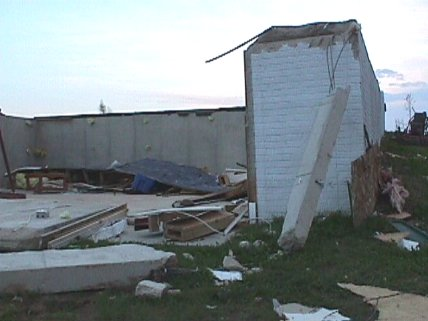
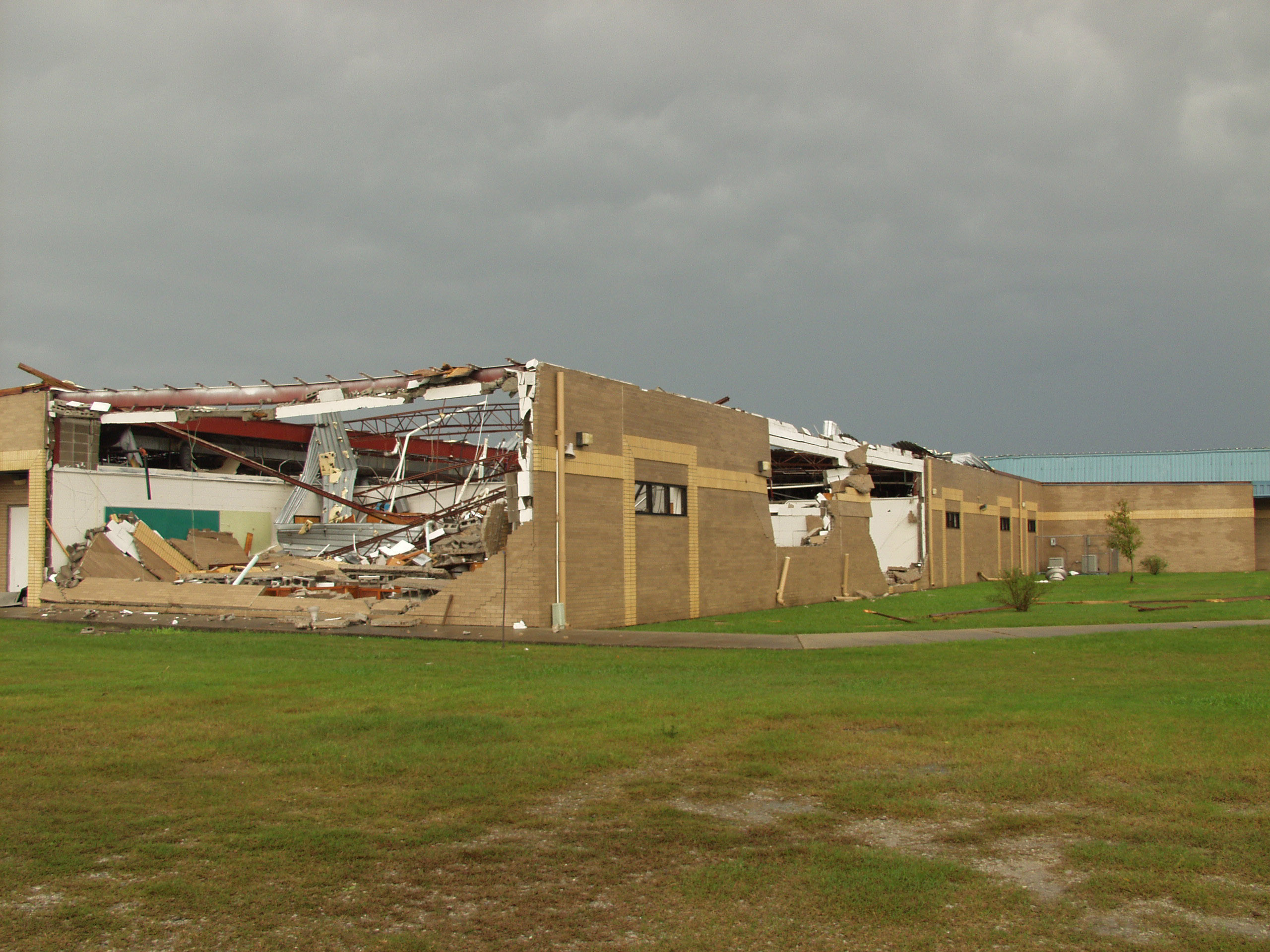
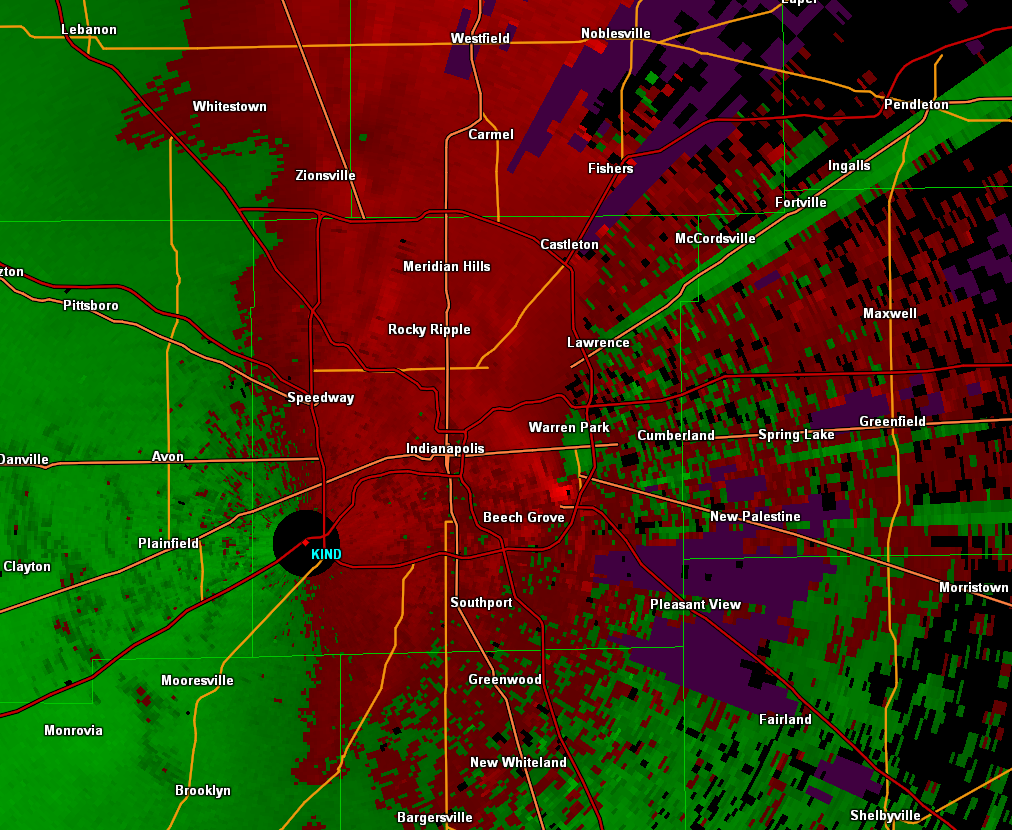
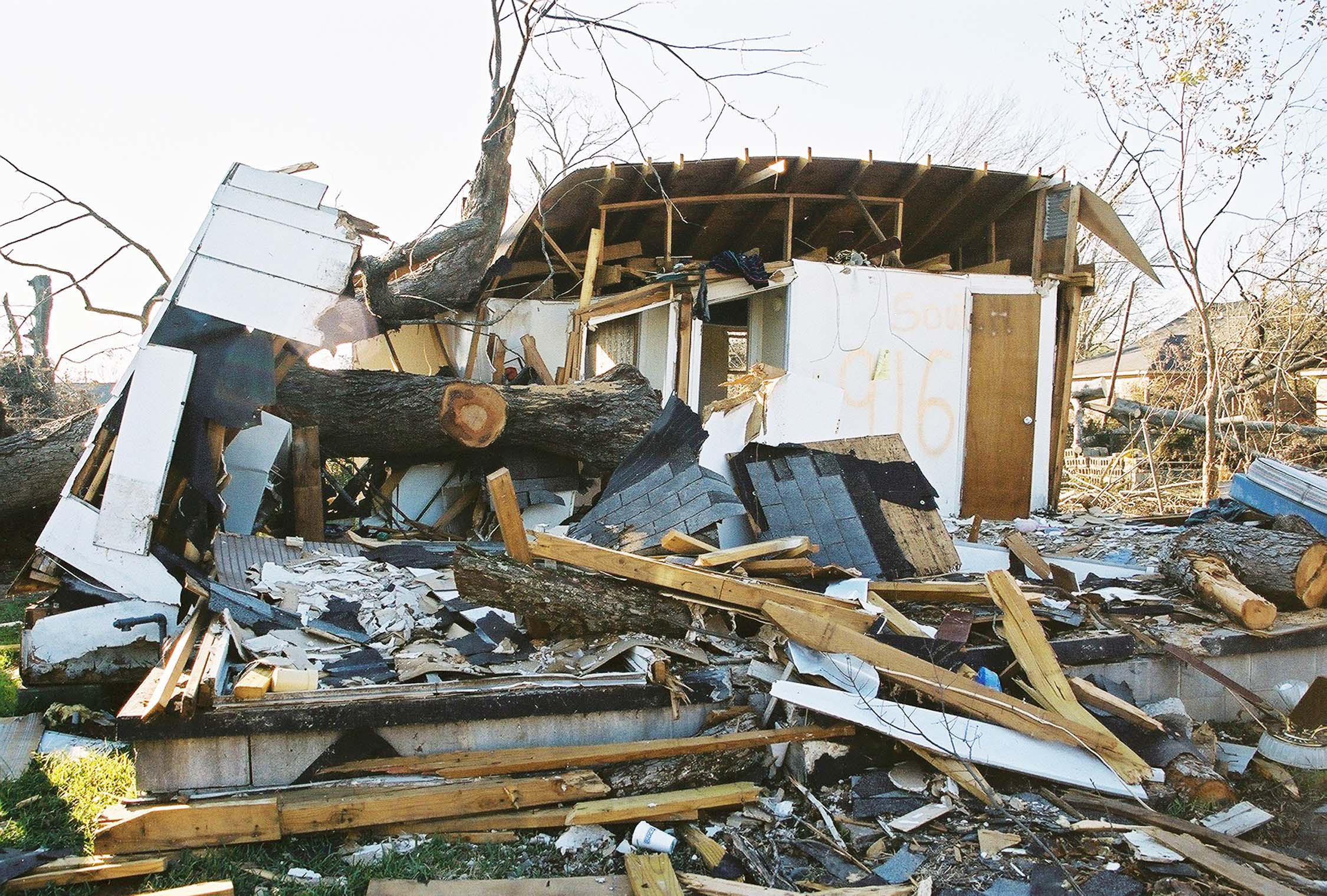
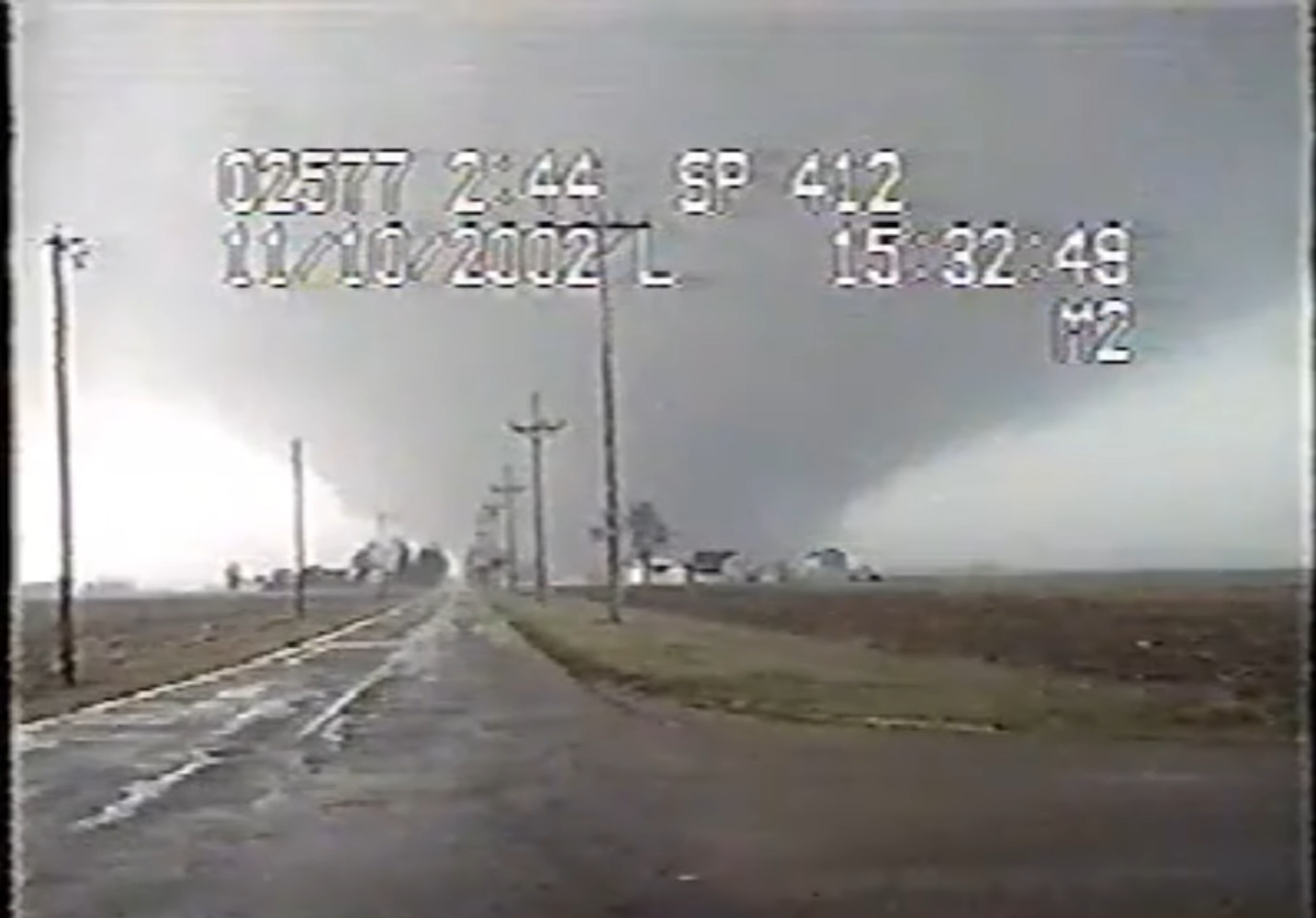
- Clockwise from top: A large F4 tornado near Van Buren, Missouri on April 24; Damage to a high school in St. Landry Parish, Louisiana after an F2 tornado on October 28; A home in Columbus, Mississippi after an F3 tornado on November 10; A large F4 tornado near Van Wert, Ohio on November 10; A radar scan of an F3 tornado moving through Indianapolis, Indiana on September 20; F4 damage to a home in La Plata, Maryland after an F4 tornado on April 28.
- Timespan: January 2 – December 30, 2002
- Maximum rated tornado: F4 tornado: Ellsinore, Missouri on April 24; La Plata, Maryland on April 28; Barnard, South Dakota on June 23; Medina, North Dakota on August 11; Van Wert, Ohio on November 10
- Tornadoes in U.S.: 934
- Damage (U.S.): $802.053 million
- Fatalities (U.S.): 55
- Fatalities (worldwide): >55

This page documents the tornadoes and tornado outbreaks of 2002, primarily in the United States. Most tornadoes form in the U.S., although some events may take place internationally. The year had several large outbreaks that included the Veterans Day Weekend tornado outbreak and the Midwest to Mid-Atlantic United States tornado outbreak.

== Synopsis ==
The tornado season of 2002 was a below average season with only 934 tornadoes touching down, However, this season had its two largest outbreaks occurring early in the year and late in the year because of cold fronts being able to create favorable conditions for tornadic activity in the United States. The 2002 Veterans Day weekend tornado outbreak was the worst outbreak out of the entire year.

== Events ==
=== United States yearly total ===
Confirmed tornadoes by Fujita rating
FU	F0	F1	F2	F3	F4	F5	Total
0	623	215	65	26	5	0	934

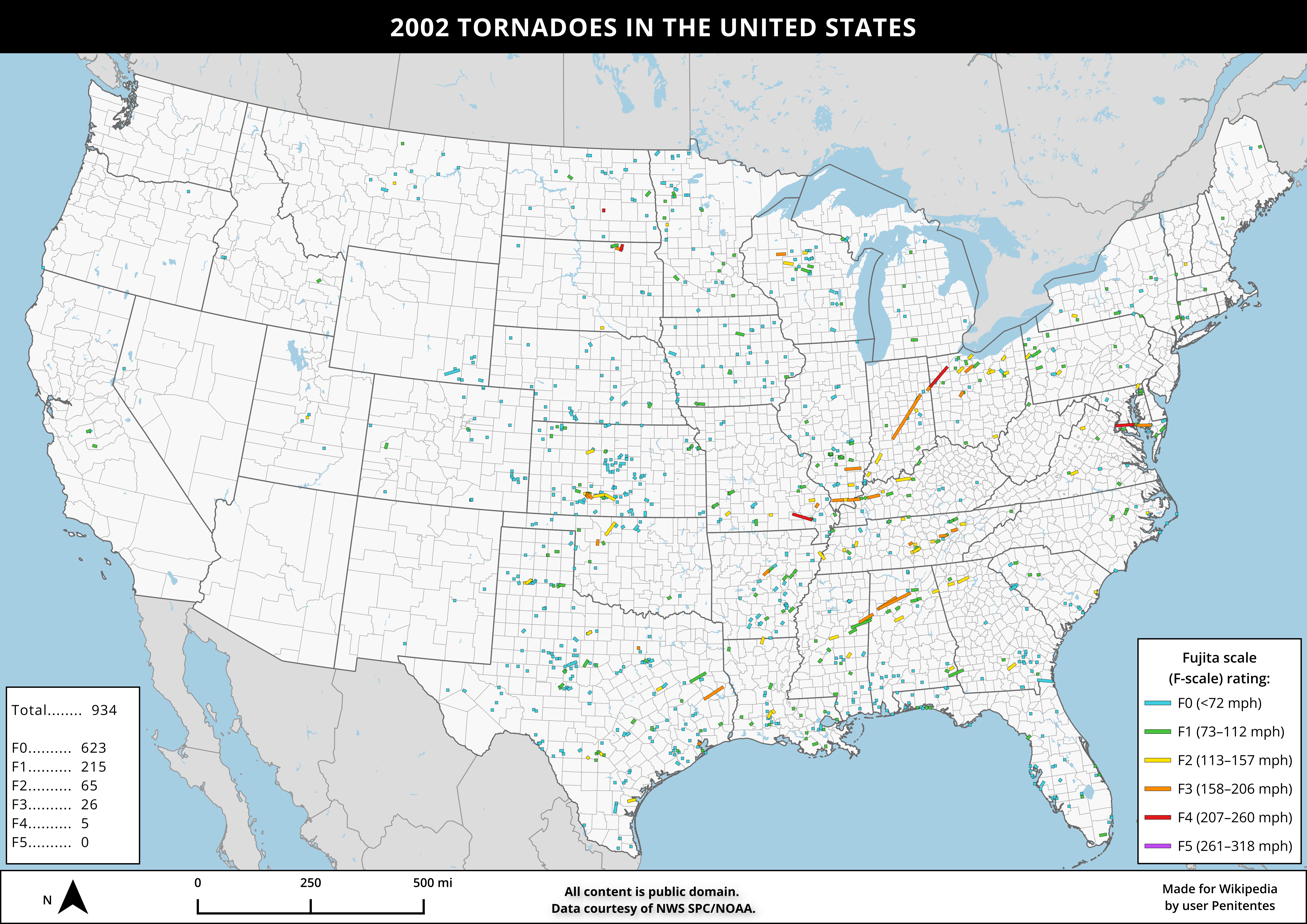
Map of 2002 United States tornado paths.

Fatal United States tornadoes in 2002
- Approximate touchdown location of killer tornadoes in 2002
Summary of tornadoes
- April 21 – Illinois (1 death)
- April 27 – Missouri (1 death)
- April 28 – Illinois (1 death)
- April 28 – Indiana, Kentucky (1 death)
- April 28 – Maryland (3 deaths)
- May 5 – Texas (2 deaths)
- May 9 – Illinois (2 deaths)
- October 24 – Texas (1 death)
- October 29 – Louisiana (2 deaths)
- November 5 – Alabama (1 death)
- November 9 – Tennessee (2 deaths)
- November 10 – Tennessee (2 deaths)
- November 10 – Ohio (4 deaths)
- November 10 – Ohio (1 death)
- November 10 – Tennessee (2 deaths)
- November 10 – Alabama (4 deaths)
- November 10 – Pennsylvania (1 death)
- November 10 – Mississippi, Alabama (1 death)
- November 10 – Tennessee (7 deaths)
- November 10 – Alabama (7 deaths)
- November 10 – Tennessee (4 deaths)
- November 10 – Alabama (1 death)
- December 17 – Missouri (2 deaths)
- December 18 – Missouri (1 death)
- December 18 – Arkansas (1 death)
Total fatalities: 55

== January ==
There were three tornadoes confirmed in the US in January.

== February ==
There were two tornadoes confirmed in the US in February.

== March ==
There were 47 tornadoes confirmed in the US in March.

=== March 24 ===
A rare 30 yard wide F0 tornado formed in Hawaii at 6:55 PM, doing $60,000 in damage.

== April ==
There were 117 tornadoes confirmed in the US in April.

=== April 24 ===
FU	F0	F1	F2	F3	F4	F5
0	5	2	1	0	1	0

An F4 tornado touched down in Van Buren, Missouri, resulting in no fatalities.

=== April 27–28 ===
FU	F0	F1	F2	F3	F4	F5
0	11	18	12	6	1	0

This fairly large tornado outbreak killed 6 people and inflicted ≥$224 million (2002 USD) of damage to the states of Illinois, Indiana, Kentucky, Maryland, New York, Ohio, Pennsylvania, Tennessee, Virginia, West Virginia, Iowa, Kansas, Missouri, and Nebraska. It caused some hail damage to crops and houses as well.

== May ==
There were 204 tornadoes confirmed in the US in May.

=== May 5 ===
FU	F0	F1	F2	F3	F4	F5
0	27	5	3	0	0	0

34 tornadoes touchdown in US, including 19 in Texas. Three tornadoes were rated F2, including a dust filled wedge tornado that struck Happy, Texas and a killer tornado.

=== May 7 ===
FU	F0	F1	F2	F3	F4	F5
0	11	4	3	3	0	0

21 tornadoes were reported, including 17 in Kansas, with three of the tornadoes reached F3 intensity. A long-tracked F2 tornado also prompted a tornado emergency in Pratt, Kansas, but there were no fatalities.

=== May 20 (Hong Kong) ===
A weak tornado struck Hong Kong International Airport.

== June ==
There were 97 tornadoes confirmed in the US in June.

=== June 23 ===
FU	F0	F1	F2	F3	F4	F5
0	4	2	0	1	1	0

A localized outbreak of eight tornadoes struck the Dakotas over a period of only 93 minutes. One supercell thunderstorm spawned six tornadoes in Brown County, South Dakota. One was an F3 tornado that destroyed at least one home. Another was an F4 tornado that occurred four miles east of Barnard, South Dakota and destroyed a pheasant farm. There were no deaths or significant injuries with the storm. The storm was documented by at least one storm chasing team, and was featured on an episode of The Weather Channel's "Storm Stories."

== July ==
There were 68 tornadoes confirmed in the US in July.

=== July 28 ===
A brief F1 tornado impacted Mottville, New York, which caused $2 million (2002 USD) in damage.

== August ==
There were 86 tornadoes confirmed in the US in August.

=== August 1 ===
During the first day of August, four tornadoes were confirmed across lower Michigan, including two F1 tornadoes, the first one traveled a mile from the lakeshore in Boyne City, causing significant damage to The Landings Condos and uprooting trees across the town. The final one was half a mile wide and traveled 6 and a half miles, hitting Tustin in the early evening hours of August 1.

=== August 11 ===
An F4 tornado touched down in North Dakota, resulting in no casualties.

== September ==
There were 61 tornadoes confirmed in the US in September.

=== September 2 ===
At approximately 4:20 PM CDT, an F3 tornado tore through the town of Ladysmith, Wisconsin, causing $25 million in damage. 27 people were injured but nobody was killed. The tornado had a path of 16 miles, and was one of six to touchdown in Wisconsin that day.

=== September 8 ===
An F2 tornado struck Manti, Utah, a small town located 8.5 miles from the geographical center of the state, at an elevation of 5,600 feet. The tornado touched down outside of town at about 1:49pm, and within 2 minutes it had entered the southwest corner of town. On a northeasterly path, it traversed the southern half of town and exited on the east. After crossing an empty field, it was met by the east mountain which rises 4,000 feet above the valley floor. It continued approximately halfway up the face of the mountain, before becoming disorganized and roping out. It caused significant damage to several houses, destroying one completely. Other damages include a lumber store; uprooted trees, some of which were large; camping trailers, a semi-trailer; and downed power poles, resulting in damages of $2,000,000. No one was killed or injured.

=== September 20 ===
An F3 tornado in Indiana became one of the longest tracked tornadoes in the state's history after it formed along a squall line and tracked 112 miles from near Ellettsville in Monroe County to northeast of Hartford City in Blackford County. A tornado emergency was issued for Marion County as the tornado passed very close to Indianapolis. The tornado injured 127 people, but none were killed.

== October ==
There were 58 tornadoes confirmed in the US in October.

== November ==
FU	F0	F1	F2	F3	F4	F5
0	20	34	20	8	1	0

There were 96 tornadoes confirmed in the US in November.

=== November 9–11 ===
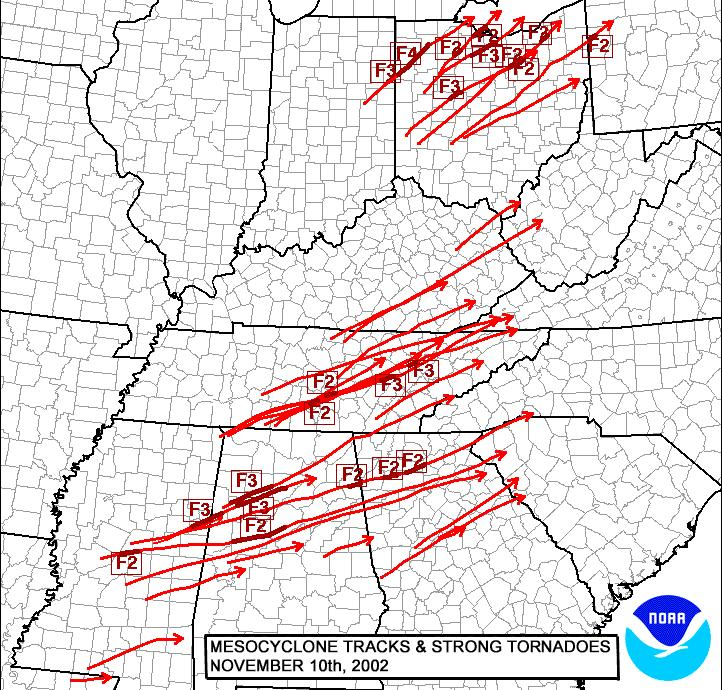
Map of mesocyclone/tornado paths during the 'Veterans Day outbreak'

The Veterans Day outbreak was an unseasonably strong and destructive severe weather event that spawned 83 tornadoes in 36 hours across a widespread swath in the Central and Eastern United States. It was the second largest tornado outbreak on record in November and also among the deadliest, killing 36 people, most of the destruction occurring on the 10th.

== December ==
There were 99 tornadoes confirmed in the US in December.

=== December 17–19 ===
A severe weather event spawned 48 tornadoes across a widespread swath in the Central and southern United States. On December 17, a long-track F2 tornado killed 2 people and also badly damaged the Lucky Lady Trailer Park near Springfield, MO. Tornadic activity peaked on December 18 when 39 tornadoes occurred, including an F3 tornado that passed near the town of Hamlet and destroyed several permanent and mobile homes, resulting in a fatality. Tornadic activity concluded on the 19th with 6 tornadoes, including an F2 tornado in Mississippi which resulted in no casualties.

=== December 23–24 ===
An unseasonably strong severe weather event spawned 48 weak tornadoes in 43 hours across a widespread swath in the Southern United States.

=== December 30 – January 1, 2003 ===
A line of storms spawned 13 tornadoes.

== See also ==
- Weather of 2002
- Tornado
  - Tornadoes by year
  - Tornado records
  - Tornado climatology
  - Tornado myths
- List of tornado outbreaks
  - List of F5 and EF5 tornadoes
  - List of F4 and EF4 tornadoes
  - List of North American tornadoes and tornado outbreaks
  - List of 21st-century Canadian tornadoes and tornado outbreaks
  - List of European tornadoes and tornado outbreaks
  - List of tornadoes and tornado outbreaks in Asia
  - List of Southern Hemisphere tornadoes and tornado outbreaks
  - List of tornadoes striking downtown areas
  - List of tornadoes with confirmed satellite tornadoes
- Tornado intensity
  - Fujita scale
  - Enhanced Fujita scale
  - International Fujita scale
  - TORRO scale
