= Troy, South Carolina =

- Town
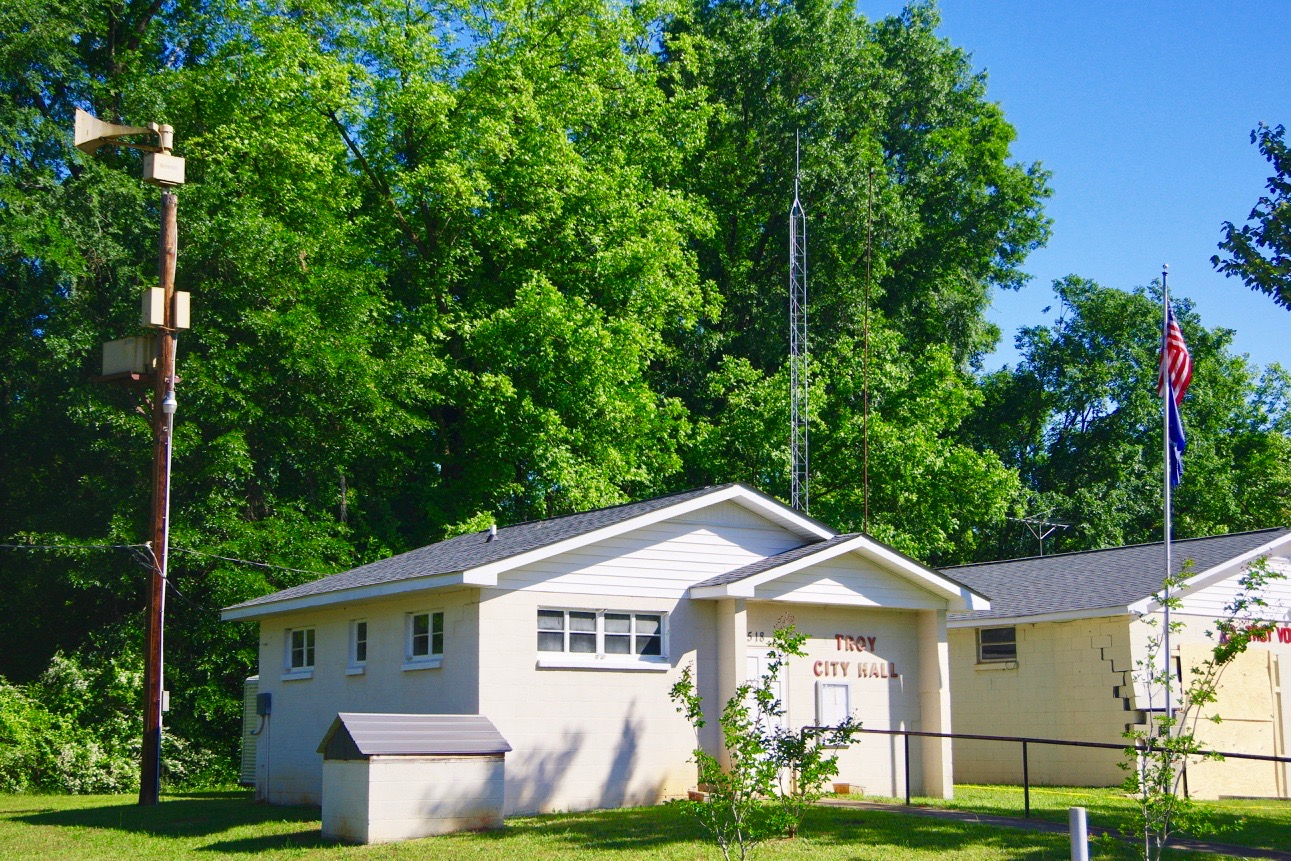
- City Hall

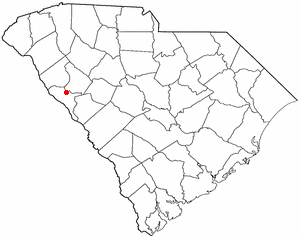
- Location of Troy, South Carolina
- Coordinates: 33°59′17″N 82°17′51″W
- Country: United States
- State: South Carolina
- County: Greenwood

Area
  - Total: 0.80 sq mi (2.07 km^{2})
  - Land: 0.80 sq mi (2.07 km^{2})
  - Water: 0 sq mi (0.00 km^{2})
- Elevation: 518 ft (158 m)

Population (2020)
  - Total: 83
  - Density: 103.9/sq mi (40.11/km^{2})
- Time zone: UTC-5 (Eastern (EST))
  - Summer (DST): UTC-4 (EDT)
- ZIP code: 29848
- Area codes: 864, 821
- FIPS code: 45-72655
- GNIS feature ID: 2406759

Troy is a town in Greenwood County, South Carolina, United States. As of the 2020 census, Troy had a population of 83.

== Population ==
As per population census 2020, Troy has a population of 85.

== History ==
The Long Cane Massacre Site and Lower Long Cane Associate Reformed Presbyterian Church are listed on the National Register of Historic Places.

== Geography ==
Troy is located in southwest Greenwood County. South Carolina Highway 10 passes through the town, leading northeast 19 miles (31 km) to Greenwood, the county seat, and south 6 miles (10 km) to McCormick.

According to the United States Census Bureau, the town has a total area of 0.81 square miles (2.1 km^{2}), all land.

== Demographics ==
Historical population
Census	Pop.	Note	%±
1890	311		—
1900	263		−15.4%
1910	283		7.6%
1920	315		11.3%
1930	219		−30.5%
1940	224		2.3%
1950	242		8.0%
1960	260		7.4%
1970	207		−20.4%
1980	161		−22.2%
1990	140		−13.0%
2000	105		−25.0%
2010	93		−11.4%
2020	83		−10.8%
U.S. Decennial Census

As of the census of 2000, there were 105 people, 43 households, and 32 families residing in the town. The population density was 131.4 inhabitants per square mile (50.7/km^{2}). There were 51 housing units at an average density of 63.8 per square mile (24.6/km^{2}). The racial makeup of the town was 71.43% White and 28.57% African American.

There were 43 households, out of which 23.3% had children under the age of 18 living with them, 51.2% were married couples living together, 14.0% had a female householder with no husband present, and 23.3% were non-families. 20.9% of all households were made up of individuals, and 16.3% had someone living alone who was 65 years of age or older. The average household size was 2.44 and the average family size was 2.73.

In the town, the population was spread out, with 18.1% under the age of 18, 8.6% from 18 to 24, 23.8% from 25 to 44, 25.7% from 45 to 64, and 23.8% who were 65 years of age or older. The median age was 45 years. For every 100 females, there were 101.9 males. For every 100 females age 18 and over, there were 100.0 males.

The median income for a household in the town was $31,875, and the median income for a family was $35,625. Males had a median income of $26,875 versus $21,250 for females. The per capita income for the town was $15,502. There were no families and 8.2% of the population living below the poverty line, including no under eighteens and 19.2% of those over 64.

== Education ==
It is in the Greenwood School District 50. The zoned schools are: Mays Elementary School, Westview Middle School, and Emerald High School.

== Notable people ==
- Katherine Neel Dale, missionary
