= Long Cane Associate Reformed Presbyterian Church =

Historic church in South Carolina, United States

- U.S. National Register of Historic Places
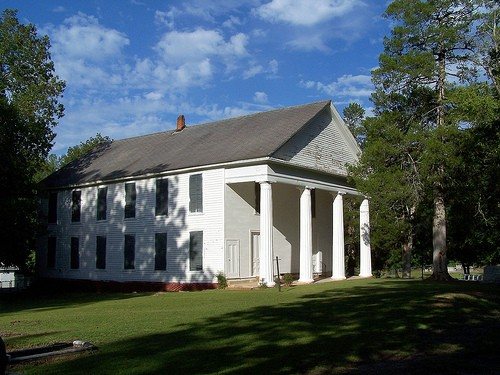

- Location within South Carolina Location within the United States
- Nearest city: Troy, South Carolina
- Coordinates: 34.016233°N 82.348975°W
- Area: 4.9 acres (2.0 ha)
- Built: 1790
- Architect: Jones, William Henry
- Architectural style: Greek Revival
- NRHP reference No.: 98000426
- Added to NRHP: 6 October 1999

Long Cane Associate Reformed Presbyterian Church is a historic Associate Reformed Presbyterian church in McCormick County, South Carolina four miles west of Troy, South Carolina on SC 33–36. Adjacent to the church building is a cemetery dating to circa 1790.

The church was listed on the National Register of Historic Places in 1999.

== History of the building ==
This current Greek Revival church building was constructed by William Henry Jones of Atlanta, a building contractor, and dedicated by Dr. Sloan on 20 July 1856. During the dedication Dr. Sloan preached from Habakkuk 2:20, "But the Lord is in His Holy Temple; let all the earth keep silent before Him". The wooden structure is 44 x 64 feet with a 10-foot porch and gallery around three sides. It remains largely original except for additions of small rooms near the pulpit which were added in 1892 when the church discontinued the use of the Session House in back of the church, which had served also as a school. Its cemetery of more than 500 graves includes burials of several charter members of Long Cane Associate Reformed Presbyterian Church from the period 1790–1856, when this church was exceptionally significant in the formation, growth, and development of the Associate Reformed Presbyterian Church as a whole. The church rests on a foundation of handmade brick piers, with a pierced brick curtain wall added at a later date. The façade features a fully engaged tetrastyle Roman Doric portico with an unadorned entablature and a steeply pitched pediment. Originally covered in wooden shingles, the roof was by ca. 1950 covered with diamond-shaped asbestos shingles. A small brick flue pierces the roof ridge at the center of the building. The interior auditorium is two stories in height with flushboard walls and ceiling. The gallery features a continuously paneled knee wall, ranked wooden floors, and simple handmade pews.
