= Waxhaws =

Area on the border of North and South Carolina, USA

Coordinates: 34°47′N 80°51′W

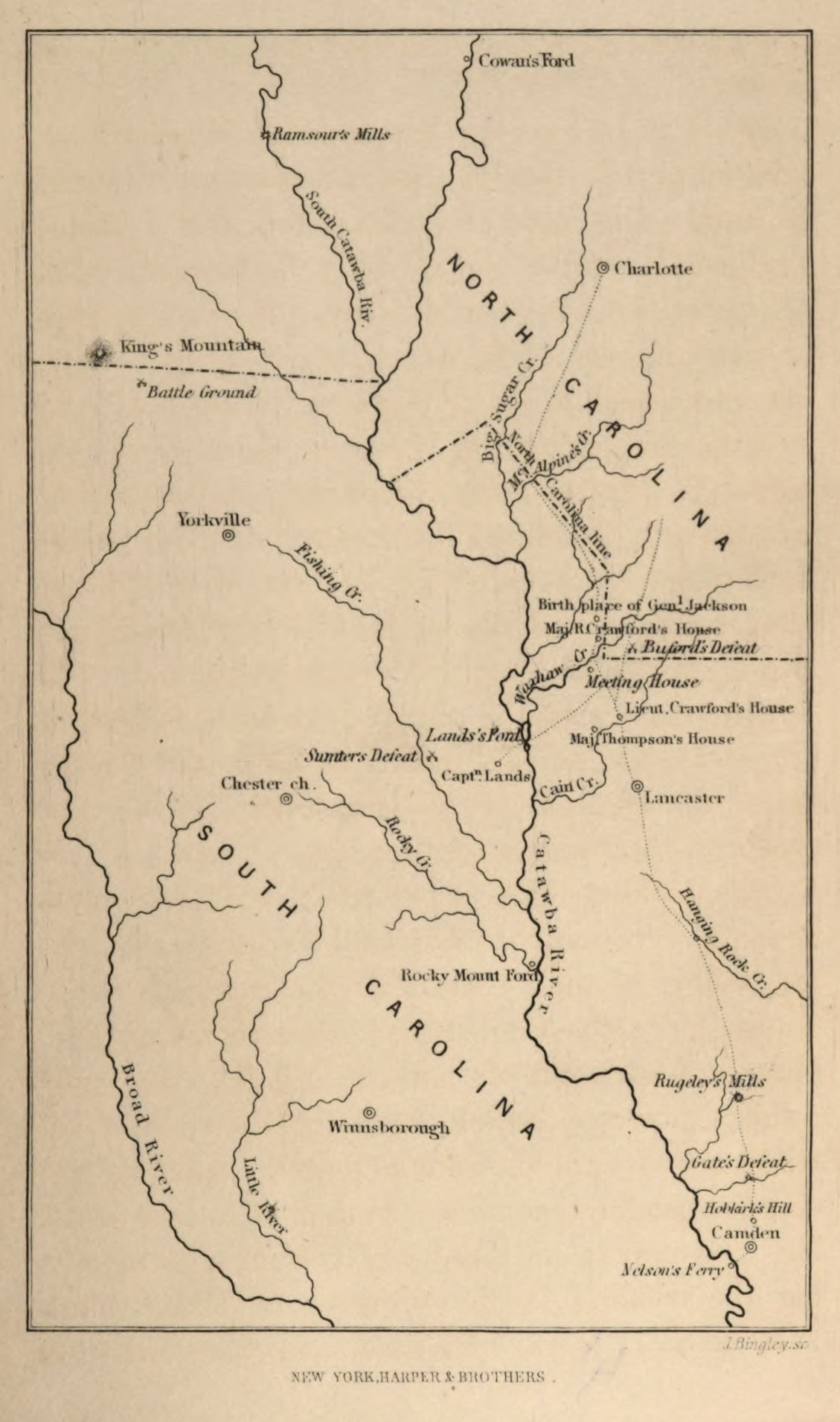
Map of the Waxhaws from a biography of Andrew Jackson (1843)

The Waxhaws is a loosely defined area on the border of North and South Carolina, in the Piedmont region. The core of the area lies on the eastern side of the Catawba River, between Camp Creek and Twelve Mile Creek, in Lancaster County, South Carolina. The region is generally forested and hilly, but not mountainous. The name derives from that of the Indian tribe who inhabited the area at the time of its discovery by Westerners, the Waxhaws. One town in the region bears the name, Waxhaw, North Carolina, incorporated in 1889. Part of the area is now the territory of the Catawba Indian Nation.

== History ==
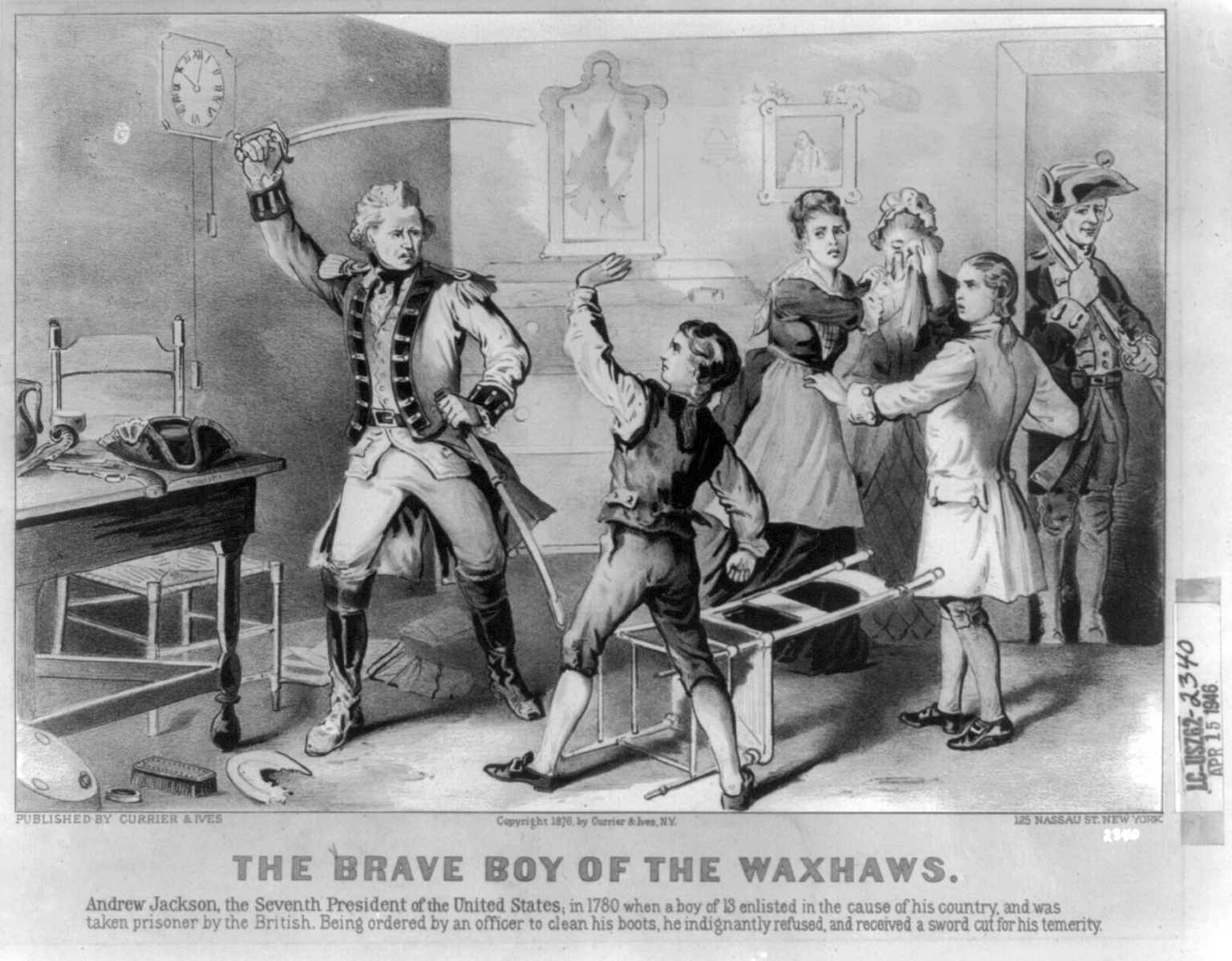
The Brave Boy of the Waxhaws (Currier and Ives print, 1876)

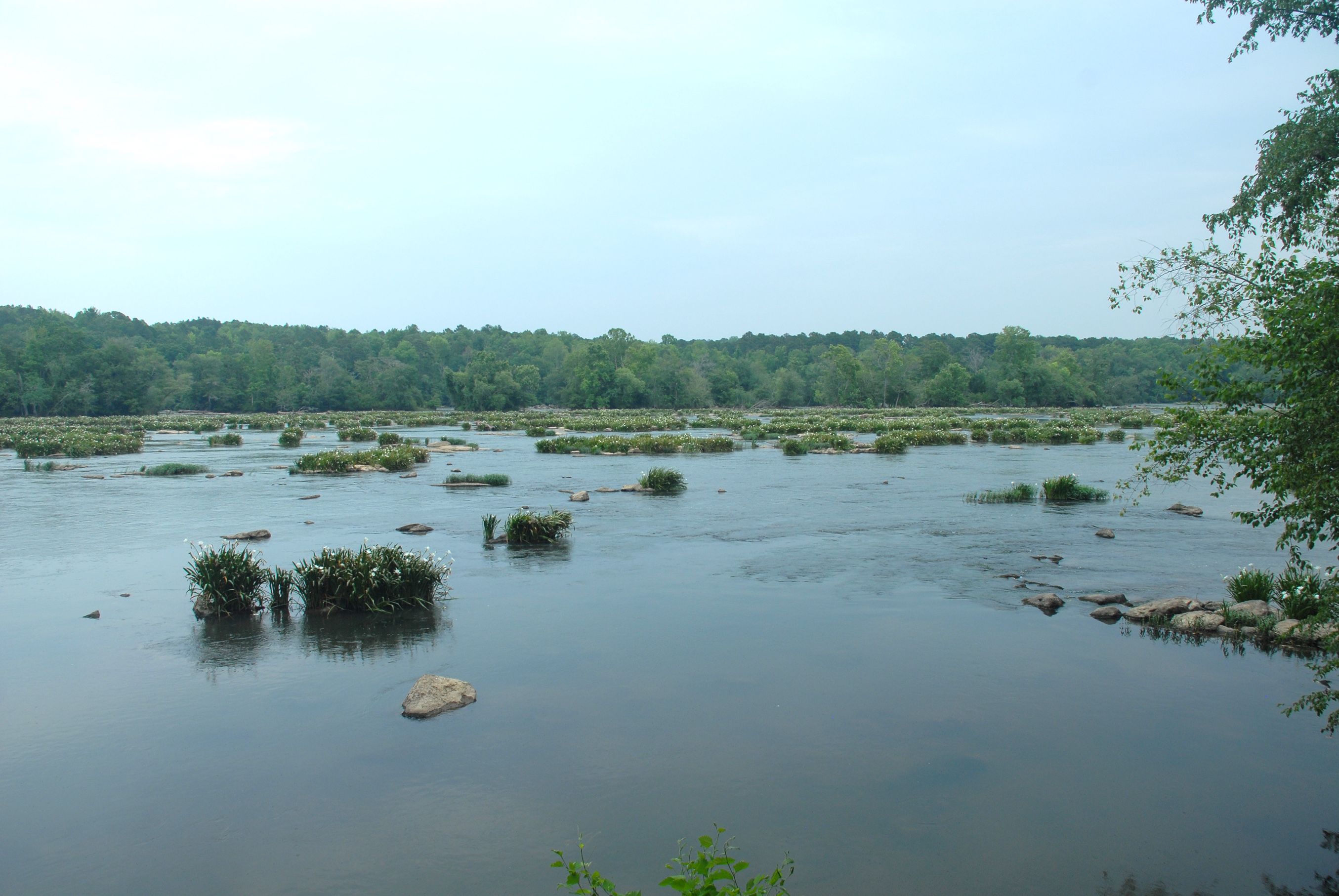
View of the Waxhaws from Landsford Canal State Park, on the western side of the Catawba River

The earliest known inhabitants of the area were the Waxhaw Indians. The Waxhaws were mostly killed or dispersed by the neighboring Catawba tribe during the Yamasee War of 1715, and the area was more or less empty when white settlers began arriving in the 1750s. The Waxhaw Settlement grew rapidly, and had close to a thousand inhabitants by the time of the Revolution, most of them Presbyterians of Scots-Irish descent. What is now the Old Waxhaw Presbyterian Church was built in 1752. Andrew Jackson, the seventh president of the United States, was born in the Waxhaws in 1767. James K. Polk, the eleventh president, was also born here, in 1795.

During the Revolutionary War, Patriot militiamen under the command of Colonel William Davie were active in the Waxhaws. In 1781, the British forces of General Lord Cornwallis briefly occupied the town of Charlotte, North Carolina, already the largest town in the region, but his garrison was soon driven out by the local militia. Cornwallis later wrote that Charlotte was "a hornet's nest of rebellion", and Charlotte still is nicknamed "the Hornet's Nest".

The region's most important Revolutionary battle did not involve locals. During the Battle of Waxhaws, a Loyalist cavalry force led by Lieutenant Colonel Banastre Tarleton easily defeated a force of approximately 350 Virginian Continentals under Colonel Abraham Buford, many of whom were killed as they were trying to surrender. The site of the battle is now the town of Buford, South Carolina.

In the 1790s, slaveowning planters began buying up land in the Waxhaws, displacing the original yeoman farmers. The planters themselves would later seek more fertile soil in the Mississippi Delta, and by the mid-19th century the settlement had been all but abandoned.

== See also ==
- Pee Dee
- The Cheraws
- The Long Canes
