= Long Cane Massacre Site =

- U.S. National Register of Historic Places
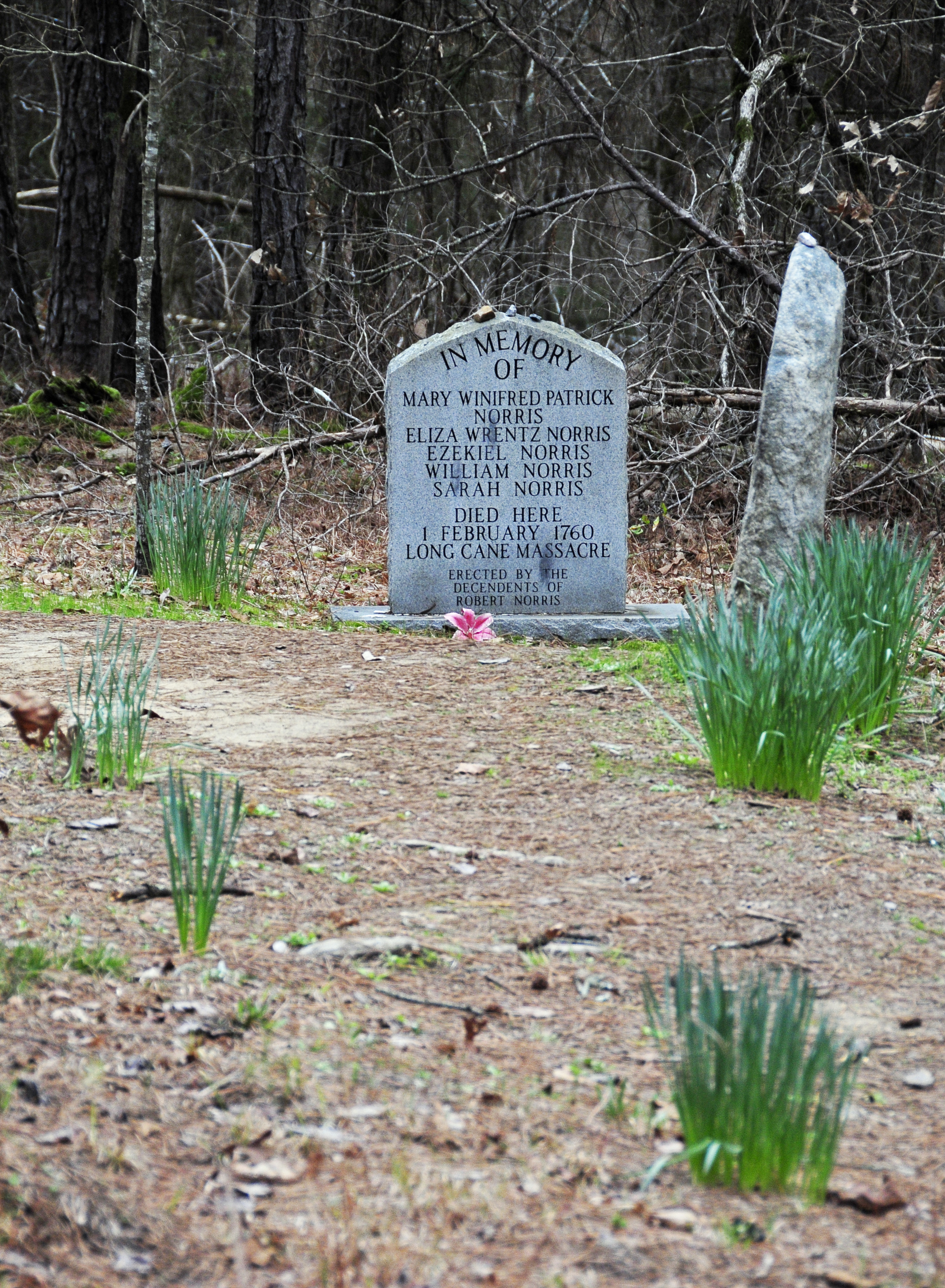
- Long Cane Massacre Site, March 2012

- Location within South Carolina Location within the United States
- Location: West of Troy off South Carolina Highway 10, near Troy, South Carolina
- Coordinates: 33°59′41″N 82°20′23″W
- Area: 1 acre (0.40 ha)
- Built: 1760
- NRHP reference No.: 83002203
- Added to NRHP: January 27, 1983

Long Cane Massacre Site is a historic site located near Troy, McCormick County, South Carolina. The district encompasses 40 contributing buildings in Mount Carmel. The site includes a gravestone marking the place where 23 Long Cane settlers were killed in a bloody massacre by the Cherokee on February 1, 1760.

It was listed on the National Register of Historic Places in 1983.
