= Due West Railway =

The Due West Railway was a short line, standard gauge railroad that served western South Carolina in the first half of the 20th century.

The carrier was incorporated January 16, 1907 as the Due West Railway Company and opened for operation in 1907. The approximately 4.5-mile route ran from Due West, South Carolina, to Donalds, South Carolina, where a branch of the Southern Railway (U.S.) operated. The Due West Railway ended operation in 1939.

The Due West Railway was unusual in that it did not run on Sunday and it would not carry express parcels of alcohol. The primary purposes of the railway were mail delivery between Donalds and Due West, and transporting students to Erskine College located in Due West, South Carolina. It was surveyed and built by one man, Thomas Carson Anderson (1868-1976) of Ninety-Six, SC, who continued surveying until he was over 100 years old. He was hired by RS Galloway, president of the railroad. Anderson contracted with a local man named Willard to move the dirt for the raid bed using mules, at 16 cents per cubic yard.

According to the Railroad Gazette, Oct 18, 1907, the Due West Railway purchased second-hand locomotives from Joseph E. Bowen, Norfolk, Virginia.
