= Due West Female College =

Private Presbyterian women's college in South Carolina

Coordinates: 34.3332°N 82.3863°W

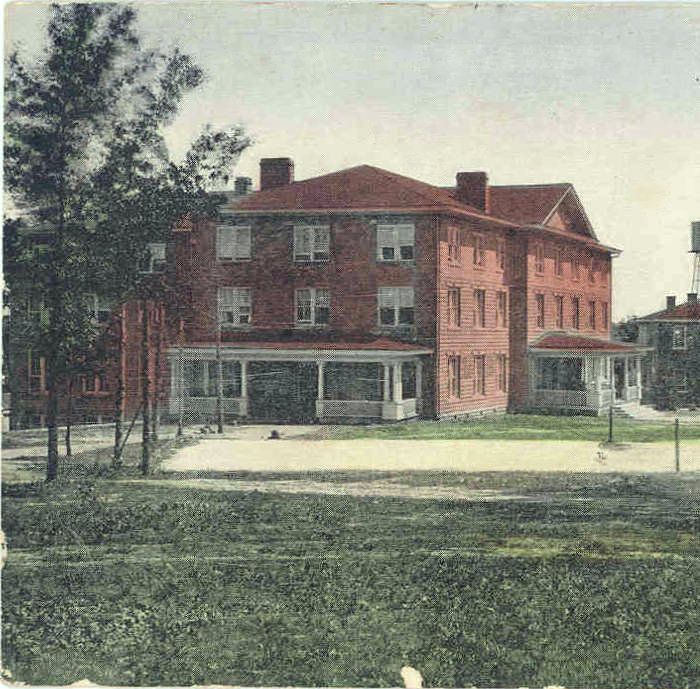
Woman's College, Due West

Due West Female College was a private women's college that operated in Due West, South Carolina, US, from 1859 until 1927, when it agreed to merge with Erskine College.

Due West was founded by a mixed group of lay men and local leaders from the Associate Reformed Presbyterian Church. Its first president was John Irwin Bonner, who had founded the first ARP Church in the town. Although some of its founders were affiliated with the church, the college did not have an official denominational affiliation until it was bought by the ARP Church in 1904.

The college's original mission was to educate women to become teachers in the Greater Abbeville County area. Over time, however, Due West began to attract students from throughout the Southern United States, including from as far away as Texas. The New York Times noted in 1906 that the college and its surrounding town had become known as the most "strait-laced" place in America, with the "damsels" of the Due West Female College being "as well behaved and as proper as members of the faculty."

Due West had been closely linked to another college in town, Erskine College, since its founding. When the better-known Erskine became fully coeducational in 1899, Due West experienced a decline in enrollment. In 1925, Due West agreed to merge with Erskine, which helped the coeducational college receive its first accreditation from the Southern Association of Colleges. The colleges officially merged in 1927, with Due West closing in 1928.

== Notable people ==
- Willie Kirkpatrick Lindsay (1875-1954), Dean of Women (1904-14)
- Katherine Neel Dale, missionary

== See also ==
- List of current and historical women's universities and colleges in the United States
- List of university and college mergers in the United States
