= Mandale, Ohio =

- Unincorporated community
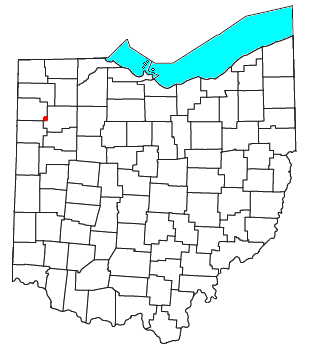
- Location of Mandale, Ohio
- Coordinates: 41°01′05″N 84°21′36″W
- Country: United States
- State: Ohio
- County: Paulding
- Township: Washington
- Elevation: 722 ft (220 m)
- Time zone: UTC-5 (Eastern (EST))
  - Summer (DST): UTC-4 (EDT)
- GNIS feature ID: 1062503

Mandale is an unincorporated community in southeastern Washington Township, Paulding County, Ohio, United States. It lies at the intersection of State Routes 66 and 114.
