= Saragossa, Alabama =

- Unincorporated community
- Location within Alabama Location within the United States
- Coordinates: 33°53′56″N 87°23′57″W
- Country: United States
- State: Alabama
- County: Walker
- Elevation: 541 ft (165 m)
- Time zone: UTC-6 (Central (CST))
  - Summer (DST): UTC-5 (CDT)
- Area codes: 205, 659
- GNIS feature ID: 160568

Saragossa is an unincorporated community in Walker County, Alabama, United States.

== History ==
Saragossa is likely named for the Zaragoza province of Spain. A post office operated under the name Saragossa from 1890 to 1967.
