= Washington Township, Paulding County, Ohio =

Township in Ohio, US

- Township
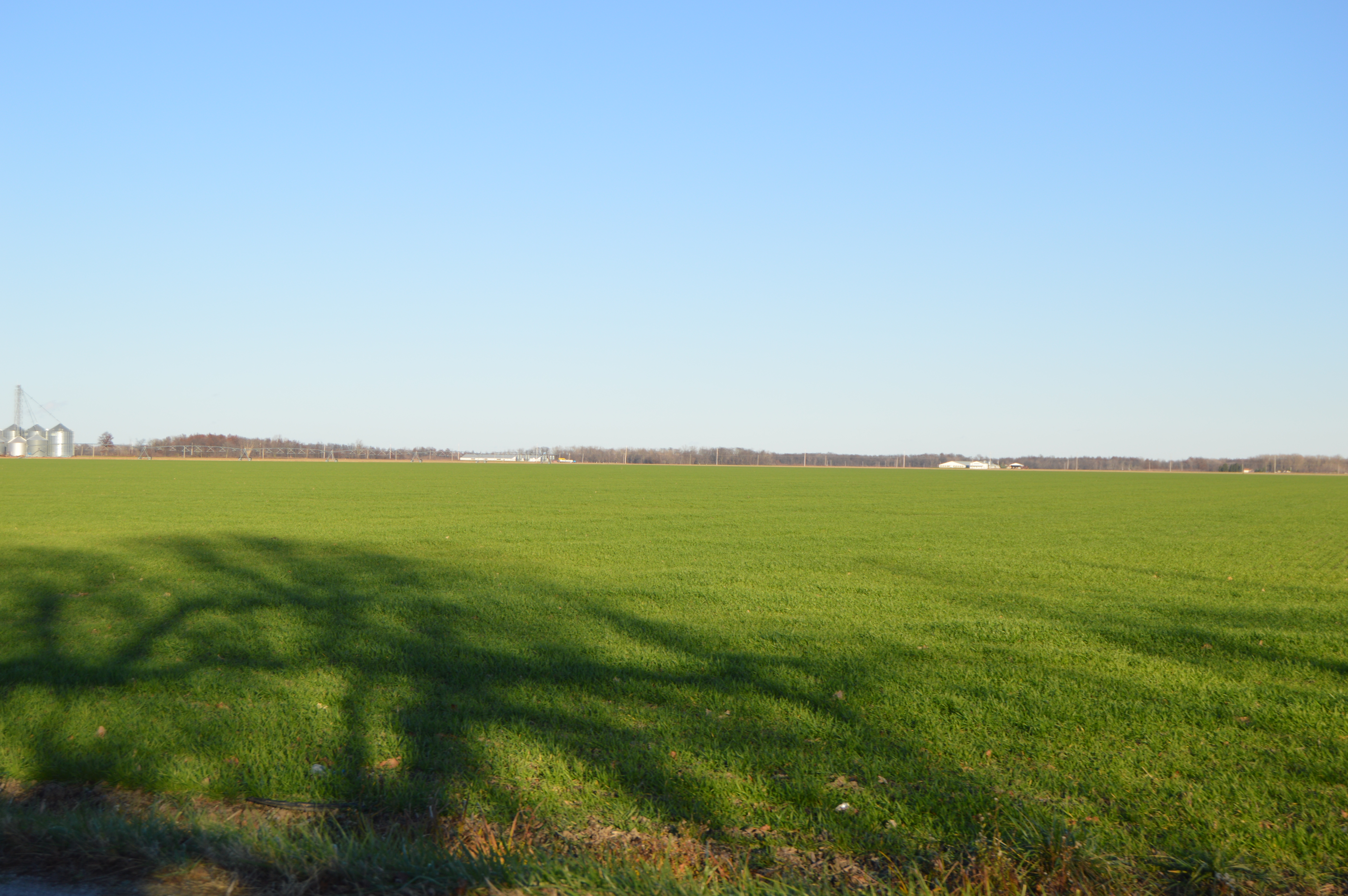
- Winter wheat fields north of Roselms

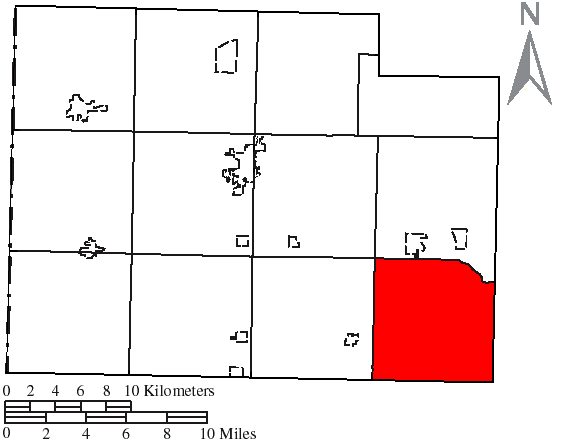
- Location of Washington Township in Paulding County
- Coordinates: 41°1′36″N 84°23′42″W
- Country: United States
- State: Ohio
- County: Paulding

Area
  - Total: 35.1 sq mi (90.8 km^{2})
  - Land: 35.0 sq mi (90.6 km^{2})
  - Water: 0.077 sq mi (0.2 km^{2})
- Elevation: 712 ft (217 m)

Population (2020)
  - Total: 663
  - Density: 19/sq mi (7.3/km^{2})
- Time zone: UTC-5 (Eastern (EST))
  - Summer (DST): UTC-4 (EDT)
- FIPS code: 39-81536
- GNIS feature ID: 1086777

Washington Township is one of the twelve townships of Paulding County, Ohio, United States. The 2020 census found 663 people in the township.

== Geography ==
Located in the southeastern corner of the county, it borders the following townships:

- Brown Township - north
- Perry Township, Putnam County - east
- Jackson Township, Putnam County - southeast
- Monterey Township, Putnam County - south
- Jackson Township, Van Wert County - southwest
- Latty Township - west
- Jackson Township - northwest corner

No municipalities are located in Washington Township, although the unincorporated communities of Mandale and Roselms lie in the township's southeast and southwest respectively.

== Name and history ==
It is one of forty-three Washington Townships statewide.

== Government ==
The township is governed by a three-member board of trustees, who are elected in November of odd-numbered years to a four-year term beginning on the following January 1. Two are elected in the year after the presidential election and one is elected in the year before it. There is also an elected township fiscal officer, who serves a four-year term beginning on April 1 of the year after the election, which is held in November of the year before the presidential election. Vacancies in the fiscal officership or on the board of trustees are filled by the remaining trustees.
