= Ohio State Route 12 =

State highway in Ohio, US

State Route 12

Route information
- Maintained by ODOT
- Length: 60.97 mi (98.12 km)
- Existed: 1923–present

Major junctions
- West end: SR 115 / SR 189 in Vaughnsville
- I-75 / SR 15 in Findlay; US 224 in Findlay; US 23 / SR 18 / SR 199 in Fostoria
- East end: SR 53 / CR 201 near Fremont

Location
- Country: United States
- State: Ohio
- Counties: Putnam, Allen, Hancock, Seneca, Sandusky

Highway system
- Ohio State Highway System; Interstate; US; State; Scenic
← SR 11	→ SR 13

State Route 12 (SR 12) is a generally northeast-southwest route in Ohio. Its western terminus is at SR 115 and SR 189 in Vaughnsville, and its eastern terminus is at SR 53 just south of Fremont.

== Route description ==
From Vaughnsville, SR 12 travels northeast through the small towns of Columbus Grove, Pandora, and Benton Ridge before entering Findlay. Through Findlay, it shortly shares a route with US 224. After exiting Findlay, it continues on a northeast heading, passing through Arcadia, Fostoria, and Bettsville before ending at SR 53.

== History ==
State Route 12's original routing in 1923 had it end in Findlay at its western terminus, and its eastern terminus extended from Fremont on U.S. Route 6's current route, going through Sandusky before ending in Cleveland.

In 1926, its eastern terminus was moved into Sandusky; its route to Cleveland was replaced with State Route 2.

When U.S. Route 6 was certified in 1932, State Route 12 was rerouted through the town of Castalia, ending in Sandusky. On this route, State Route 12 shared a route with State Route 101 from Castalia to Sandusky.

In 1938, State Route 12's western terminus was moved to U.S. Route 30N near Delphos, replacing the remaining section of State Route 106. This terminus was moved to Vaughnsville in 1971, when U.S. Route 30N (the modern routing of U.S. Route 30) moved off the Lincoln Highway.

In 1969, State Route 12's eastern terminus was moved to its current terminus. The section of road between Fremont and State Route 101 that was formerly State Route 12 was recertified as State Route 412.

== Major junctions ==
County	Location	mi	km	Destinations	Notes
Putnam	Sugar Creek Township	0.00	0.00	SR 115 (Water Street) / SR 189 west	Eastern terminus of SR 189
Allen	No major junctions				
Putnam	Columbus Grove	5.21	8.38	SR 65 (Veterans Highway)	
Putnam	Riley Township	10.45	16.82	SR 696 south / CR 6	Northern terminus of SR 696
Hancock	Union Township	19.24	30.96	SR 235 south	Western end of SR 235 concurrency
Hancock	Benton Ridge	21.50	34.60	SR 235 north	Eastern end of SR 235 concurrency
Hancock	Findlay	28.15	45.30	I-75 / SR 15 – Dayton, Toledo	Exit 157 (I-75)
Hancock	Findlay	29.37	47.27	SR 37 east / SR 568 east (South Main Street) / East Main Cross Street	Western end of SR 37 concurrency; western terminus of SR 568
Hancock	Findlay	29.72	47.83	US 224 west (North Main Street) / SR 37 end	Western end of US 224 concurrency; western terminus of SR 37
Hancock	Findlay	30.81	49.58	US 224 east (Tiffin Avenue)	Eastern end of US 224 concurrency
Seneca	Fostoria	44.24	71.20	US 23 south / SR 18 east / SR 199 south (Lytle Street)	Western end of US 23 / SR 18 / SR 199 concurrency
Seneca	Fostoria	44.56	71.71	US 23 north / SR 18 west / SR 199 north (South Street)	Eastern end of US 23 / SR 18 / SR 199 concurrency
Seneca	Liberty Township	53.20	85.62	SR 635 south – Bascom	Western end of SR 635 concurrency
Seneca	Liberty Township	53.45	86.02	SR 635 north – Kansas	Eastern end of SR 635 concurrency
Seneca	Bettsville	56.40	90.77	SR 590 north (Union Street)	Southern terminus of SR 590
Sandusky	Ballville Township	60.97	98.12	SR 53 / CR 201	
1.000 mi = 1.609 km; 1.000 km = 0.621 mi: Concurrency terminus

== Truck Route 12 ==
SR 12 has a corresponding special route, Truck Route 12, that bypasses Findlay. The 7.2-mile-long (11.6 km) truck route begins at State Route 12's interchange with Interstate 75 on the west side of Findlay. It heads north on I-75 to its interchange with Hancock County Road 99, where it exits and moves east along that road, CR 212, and Bright Road. It then moves south along Bright Road to reconnect with SR 12 on the east side of Findlay.
