= Ohio State Route 114 =

East-west state highway in Ohio, US

State Route 114

Route information
- Maintained by ODOT
- Length: 32.99 mi (53.09 km)
- Existed: 1923–present

Major junctions
- West end: State Line Road near Baldwin
- US 127 in Haviland
- East end: US 224 / SR 115 in Kalida

Location
- Country: United States
- State: Ohio
- Counties: Paulding, Putnam

Highway system
- Ohio State Highway System; Interstate; US; State; Scenic
← SR 113	→ SR 115

State Route 114 (SR 114) is a 32.99-mile (53.09 km) state route that runs between the Indiana state line and Kalida in the US state of Ohio. Most of the route is a rural two-lane highway and passes through both farmland and residential properties. The highway was first signed in 1923 on much the same alignment as today. SR 114 was extended to its current eastern terminus in Kalida in 1926. The route was paved in three sections with the first completed in 1932 and the last one completed in 1939.

== Route description ==
SR 114 heads east from State Line Road, passing through farmland as a two-lane highway. The highway has an intersection with SR 49 in rural Paulding County. The road enter Haviland, passing through industrial and residential properties. On the east side of the village is an intersection with U.S. Route 127 (US 127). East of Haviland the route passes through farmland, with some houses, before entering Grover Hill. In Grover Hill the road has an intersection with SR 637, while passes through commercial properties, with a few houses. East of Grover Hill the road passes through farmland, with some houses, and has an intersection with SR 66. The highway makes a sharp turn north at the Paulding–Putnam county line, before turning due east into Putnam County.

In Putnam County the road passes farmland and woodland. The route turns due south, before curving due east and entering the village of Cloverdale. In Cloverdale the highway has a short concurrency with SR 634. The road leaves Cloverdale and crosses over the Auglaize River. After crossing the river the route has an intersection with SR 694. The highway curves southeast and parallels the river to the northeast. The passes a mix of wood and farmland, on its way to Kalida. Before entering Kalida the highway parallels the Ottawa, a branch off of the Auglaize River. The road enters Kalida passing through residential properties, towards the central business district of the village. The route enters the central business district and turns northeast concurrent with US 224. SR 114 heads northeast concurrent with US 224 until an intersection with SR 115, this intersection is the eastern terminus of SR 114. SR 114 is not part of the National Highway System, a system of routes important to the nation's economy, mobility and defense.

== History ==
SR 114 was originally signed in 1923. At that time SR 114 ran along its current route from the Indiana state line to Mandale. In 1926, the route was extended east to Kalida. The first section of road was paved in 1932 and was between Haviland and Mandale. The western section between Indiana and Haviland was paved in 1935. The last section was paved in 1939 and was between Haviland and Kalida. No significant changes have taken place to this state route since 1939.

== Major intersections ==
County	Location	mi	km	Destinations	Notes
Paulding	Benton Township	0.00	0.00	State Line Road	Western terminus of SR 114; Indiana state line
Paulding	Benton Township	4.01	6.45	SR 49	
Paulding	Haviland	12.05	19.39	US 127	
Paulding	Grover Hill	17.08	27.49	SR 637	
Paulding	Mandale	23.21	37.35	SR 66	
Putnam	Cloverdale	27.05	43.53	SR 634 south	Western end of SR 634 concurrency
Putnam	Cloverdale	27.21	43.79	SR 634 north	Eastern end of SR 634 concurrency
Putnam	Perry Township	27.42	44.13	SR 694 east	Western terminus of SR 694
Putnam	Kalida	32.86	52.88	US 224 west	Western end of US 224 concurrency
Putnam	Kalida	32.99	53.09	US 224 east / SR 115	Eastern end of US 224 concurrency; eastern terminus of SR 114
1.000 mi = 1.609 km; 1.000 km = 0.621 mi: Concurrency terminus
