= Ohio State Route 694 =

State highway in Putnam County, Ohio, US

State Route 694

Route information
- Maintained by ODOT
- Length: 12.00 mi (19.31 km)
- Existed: 1937–present

Major junctions
- West end: SR 114 near Cloverdale
- East end: US 224 in Glandorf

Location
- Country: United States
- State: Ohio
- Counties: Putnam

Highway system
- Ohio State Highway System; Interstate; US; State; Scenic
← SR 692	→ SR 695

State Route 694 (SR 694) is a 12-mile-long (19 km) state route that runs between the Auglaize River and Glandorf in the U.S. state of Ohio. Most of the route is a rural two-lane highway and passes through farmland properties. SR 694 was first signed in 1937 on much the same alignment as today. The highway was paved in 1950.

== Route description ==
SR 694 begins at an intersection with SR 114 on the bank of the Auglaize River. The route heads north as a two-lane highway, passing through woodland and farmland. The road turns due east passing through farmland, with some houses. The highway has an intersection with SR 115 in rural Putnam County. East of the intersection the route passes a golf course and a few houses, before returning to passing mostly farmland. SR 694 curves northeast and enters the village of Glandorf. The road turns southeast and passes through industrial and residential properties. The route curves due some and has an intersection at U.S. Route 224 (US 224). This intersection is the eastern terminus of SR 694.

SR 694 is not part of the National Highway System. The highway is maintained by the Ohio Department of Transportation (ODOT). ODOT's 2011 annual average daily traffic (AADT) calculations showed that the lowest traffic levels were present on the section that is between SR 114 and SR 115, where only 650 vehicles used the highway daily; the peak traffic volume was 3,710 vehicles AADT along a section of SR 694 near its eastern terminus.

== History ==
SR 694 was designated in 1937 along the path that it occupies to this day. In 1950 the entire route was paved. No changes of major significance have occurred to the routing of the highway since 1950.

== Major intersections ==
The entire route is in Putnam County.

Location	mi	km	Destinations	Notes
Perry Township	0.00	0.00	SR 114	
Greensburg Township	4.91	7.90	SR 115	
Glandorf	12.00	19.31	US 224	
1.000 mi = 1.609 km; 1.000 km = 0.621 mi
