= Ohio State Route 634 =

State highway in Putnam County, Ohio, US

State Route 634

Route information
- Maintained by ODOT
- Length: 17.95 mi (28.89 km)
- Existed: 1937–present

Major junctions
- South end: SR 189 / SR 190 in Fort Jennings
- US 224 near Ottoville
- North end: SR 15 near Continental

Location
- Country: United States
- State: Ohio
- Counties: Putnam

Highway system
- Ohio State Highway System; Interstate; US; State; Scenic
← SR 633	→ SR 635

State Route 634 (SR 634) is a 17.95-mile-long (28.89 km) state highway in the northwestern portion of the U.S. state of Ohio. The highway runs from its southern terminus at its junction with SR 189 and SR 190 in Fort Jennings to its northern terminus at the intersection of SR 15 nearly 1.5 miles (2.4 km) north of Continental. SR 634 runs entirely within Putnam County and is entirely a two-lane highway.

SR 634 was commissioned in the late 1930s, the northern terminus was in Defiance County. Only parts of the highway was paved when it was commissioned. The last section to be paved was in the early 1950s. The northern terminus was moved to its current location in the late 1960s.

== Route description ==
SR 634 begins at an T-intersection in Fort Jennings, SR 189 enters from the northwest and SR 190 enters from the southwest. SR 190 and SR 634 leave the T-intersection concurrent, heading northeast. The road passes through residential properties, as a two-lane highway. Before leaving Fort Jennings, SR 634 leaves SR 190, heading due north. SR 634 heads north, leaving Fort Jennings and entering rural Putnam County. In rural Putnam County the road passes through farmland, as a two-lane highway. The road has an intersection with U.S. Route 224 (US 224), in rural Jackson Township. Here, SR 634 has its lowest traffic counts; within the 2011 ODOT survey, the road is listed with an average annual daily traffic (AADT) of 450 vehicles on a section of highway that is between US 224 and SR 114. At Township Road M (T–M), SR 634 makes a sharp turn, heading due west. That turn is followed by another sharp turn due north. The highway has a T-intersection with SR 114 in Cloverdale. SR 634 heads due east, concurrent with SR 114, before SR 634 turns northwest bound and SR 114 continues southeasterly. The road heads northwest, leaving Cloverdale and begins to parallel the Auglaize River.

SR 634 parallels the river, until the highway crosses the river just south of Dupont. The road enters the village of Dupont, after the bridge over the Auglaize River ends. SR 634 passes through mostly residential properties in Dupont. The route leaves Dupont, heading north passing through farmland. SR 634 turns east concurrent with SR 613. The two routes head concurrently into Continental, passing through commercial and residential properties. SR 634 turns due north leaving SR 613. The highway heads through downtown Continental, passing through commercial properties. In downtown the route crosses two Norfolk Southern Railroad tracks. The road crosses over a railroad branch line. Here, SR 634 has its highest traffic counts with 2,690 vehicles on a section of highway that is in downtown Continental. The highway passes through residential properties, before leaving Continental. North of Continental, the route passes through farmland, before coming to its northern terminus at an intersection with SR 15. Continuing north after SR 634 ends is County Road 21. There are no segments of SR 634 that are included as a part of the National Highway System (NHS).

== History ==
The SR 634 designation was applied in 1937 commissioned from Fort Jennings to SR 18 east of Defiance. The highways was paved between Fort Jennings and Cloverdale, then again from Continental to the Defiance County line. In 1951 the last section of the route was paved, that was a section of road in Defiance County, just south of the then northern terminus. Between 1967 and 1969, the section of SR 634 north of SR 15 was decommissioned.

== Major intersections ==
The entire route is in Putnam County.

Location	mi	km	Destinations	Notes
Fort Jennings	0.00	0.00	SR 189 / SR 190 south	Southern end of SR 190 concurrency
Fort Jennings	0.27	0.43	SR 190 north	Northern end of SR 190 concurrency
Jackson Township	2.82	4.54	US 224	
Cloverdale	8.17	13.15	SR 114 west	Western end of SR 114 concurrency
Cloverdale	8.33	13.41	SR 114	Eastern end of SR 114 concurrency
Perry Township	13.44	21.63	SR 613 west	Western end of SR 613 concurrency
Continental	15.43	24.83	SR 613	Eastern end of SR 613 concurrency
Monroe Township	17.95	28.89	SR 15	
1.000 mi = 1.609 km; 1.000 km = 0.621 mi: Concurrency terminus
