= Michaels Farm =

- U.S. National Register of Historic Places
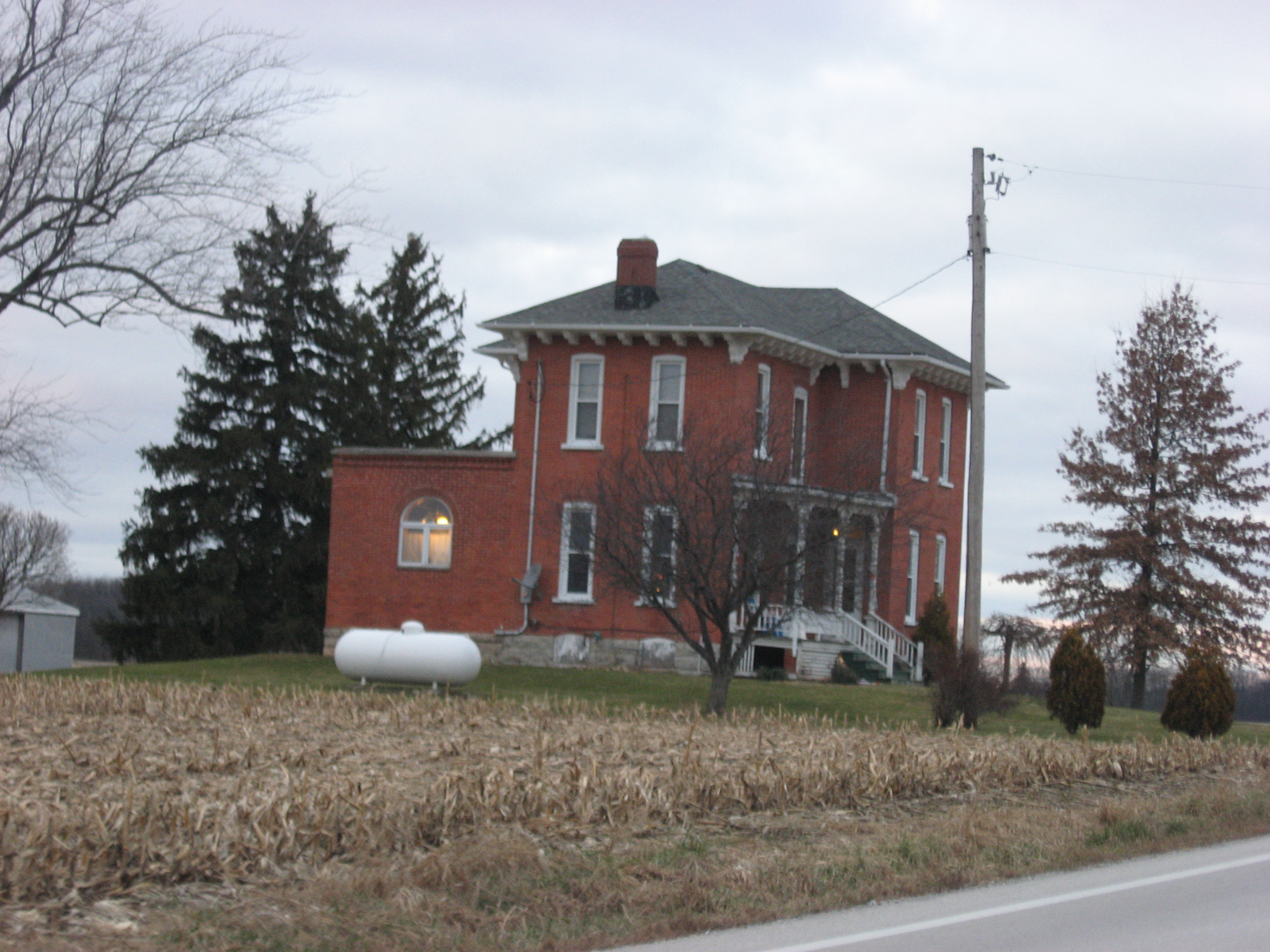
- Southern side and front of the farmhouse on a winter evening

- Location within Ohio Location within the United States
- Location: 7249 State Route 635, south of Kansas
- Coordinates: 41°13′43″N 83°16′46″W
- Area: 79.7 acres (32.3 ha)
- Built: 1878
- Architectural style: Greek Revival, Italianate
- NRHP reference No.: 79001943
- Added to NRHP: November 29, 1979

The Michaels Farm is a historic homestead in the northwestern part of the U.S. state of Ohio. Composed of simple vernacular structures and buildings with clear architectural stylistic influences, the farm has been home to members of the same families for nearly two hundred years, and it has been named a historic site.

The rich and productive soil of Liberty Township attracted numerous farmers from the earliest days of settlement, and the township was officially organized in 1832. Among the early villages in the township was a settlement known as Kansas, which was platted in early 1855. By this time, many families of pioneer settlers had become prosperous farmers. One of these prosperous farms was home to the family of John Michaels, who had been one of the first settlers in the area; he and his family occupied a farm located south of Kansas on a road that has since become State Route 635. Michaels had not been the original property owner: the land had been brought under cultivation by 1829, but he and his family first obtained the title in the 1830s. Michaels' descendants and a related family named Dicken continuously owned and operated the property as a typical farm into the late twentieth century. Such an extended tenure has caused the property to portray changes in architectural tastes: the extant buildings date from a wide range of years and are examples of multiple architectural styles.

Nine buildings compose the farmstead: six historic buildings and three newer. The most prominent building is the 1870s brick farmhouse, an Italianate two-story structure with a hip roof supported by brackets and an ornamental cornice. Other buildings on the farm are older, including simpler frame barns with Greek Revival elements; even a privy survives to the present.

In 1979, the Michaels Farm was listed on the National Register of Historic Places; its historic buildings were named contributing properties, and the others were deemed non-contributing. It is the only federally designated historic site in Liberty Township, although more than forty other locations have been given this designation elsewhere in Seneca County. Key to its designation was the property's consistent history of use by the same families for more than a century and a half and the wide range of historic agricultural buildings that survived in good condition.
