= Rimer, Ohio =

Unincorporated community in Ohio, U.S.

Coordinates: 40°53′04″N 84°12′41″W

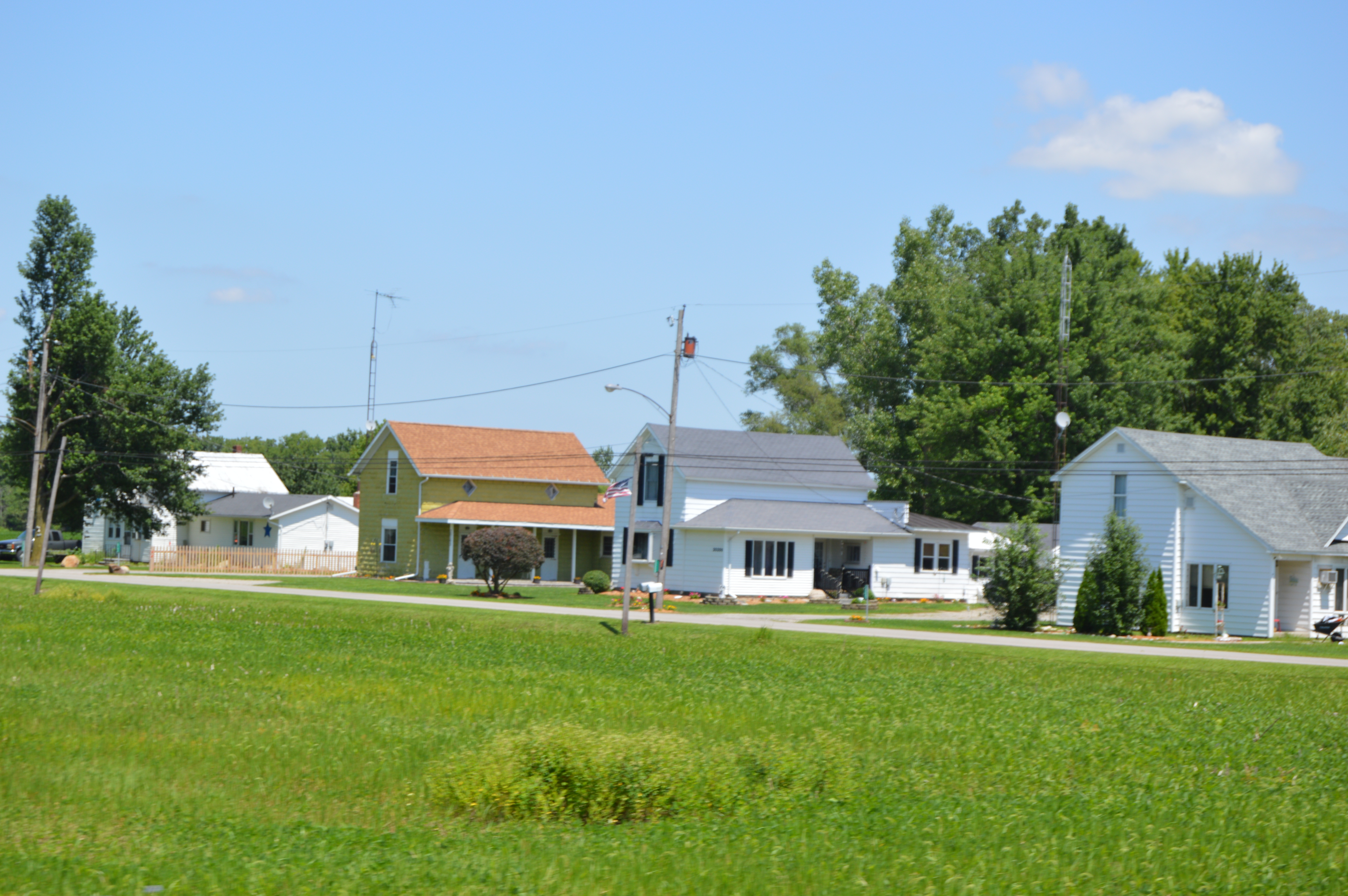
Houses on Road 18-R

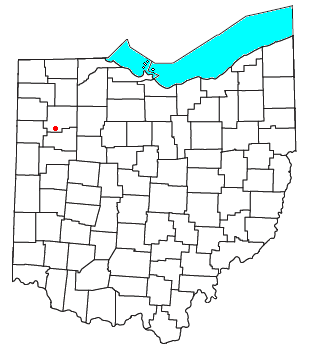
Location of Rimer, Ohio

Rimer is an unincorporated community in western Sugar Creek Township, Putnam County, Ohio, United States. It lies along State Route 189 between Fort Jennings and Vaughnsville.

== History ==
Rimer was originally called Roxburg, and under the latter name was laid out in 1881. The present name is for D. P. Rimer, the original owner of the town site. A post office called Rimer was in operation from 1882 until 1916. Home of the Schlosser.
