= Ohio State Route 189 =

State highway in Ohio, United States

State Route 189

Route information
- Maintained by ODOT
- Length: 11.58 mi (18.64 km)
- Existed: 1923–present

Major junctions
- West end: US 224 / SR 66 in Ottoville
- East end: SR 12 / SR 115 in Vaughnsville

Location
- Country: United States
- State: Ohio
- Counties: Putnam

Highway system
- Ohio State Highway System; Interstate; US; State; Scenic
← SR 188	→ SR 190

State Route 189 (SR 189, OH 189) is a 11.58-mile (18.64 km) long state highway in the northwestern portion of the U.S. state of Ohio. The highway runs from its western terminus at its junction with U.S. Route 224 (US 224) and SR 66 in Ottoville to its eastern terminus at the intersection of SR 115 and SR 12 in Vaughnsville, nearly 5 miles (8.0 km) southwest of Columbus Grove. SR 189 runs entirely within Putnam County and is entirely a two-lane highway.

The SR 189 designation was applied in the early 1920s. The designation was on a route that was to the south of the current. In the mid 1920s SR 189 was rerouted onto its current route between Fort Jennings and Vaughnsville. The route was extended to Ottoville in the early 1930s.

== Route description ==
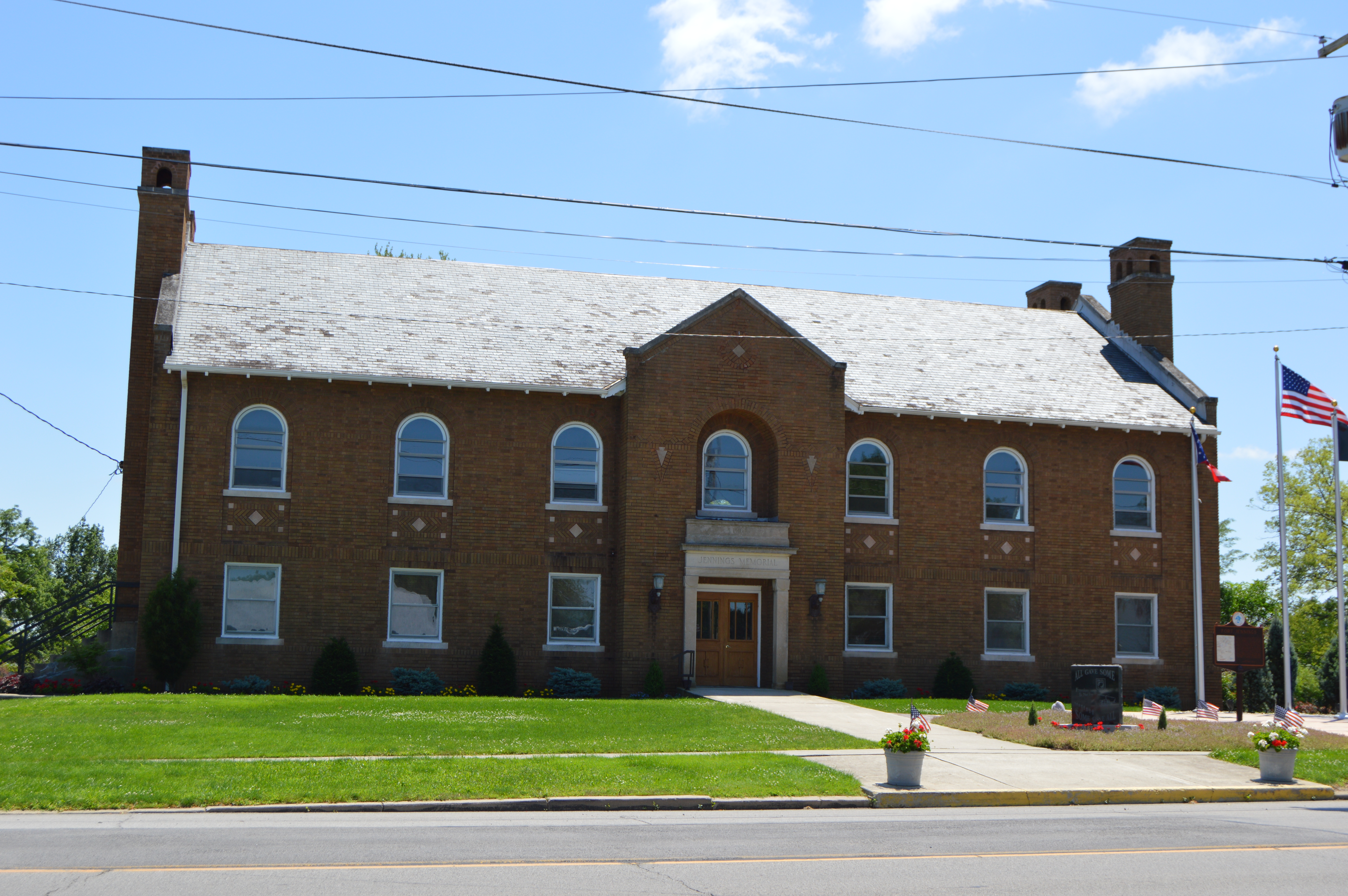
Community center in Fort Jennings

SR 189 begins at a three-way intersection, in Ottoville, with SR 66 entering from the south and US 224 and SR 66 entering from the west. SR 189 heads east concurrent with US 224, passing through residential and commercial properties. Here, SR 189 has its highest traffic counts; within the 2011 ODOT survey, the road is listed with an average annual daily traffic(AADT) of 3,930 vehicles on a section of highway that is concurrent with US 224. US 224 turns north and SR 189 continues easterly. The route passes through residential properties, before curving towards the southeast. After curving towards the southeast, the route leaves the village of Ottoville and the road passes through farmland. The highway enters the village of Fort Jennings, passing through residential properties. The highway has a T-intersection with SR 190.

At the T-intersection, SR 189 turns towards the southwest, concurrent with SR 190. The road passes through commercial properties, before the concurrency ends with SR 189 turning towards the southeast. SR 189 crosses the Auglaize River and leaves the village of Fort Jennings. The road heads east-southeast through farmland as a two-lane highway. The highway cross over the Ottawa River and enters Rimer. SR 189 makes a sharp curve towards the south, followed by a sharp curve towards the east. The road makes another sharp curve towards the south, after leaving Rimer the road curves towards the southeast, paralleling the Ottawa River. As the river curves towards the south, SR 189 curves due east. SR 189 heads east towards Vaughnsville, the AADT drops to 330 vehicles through this section of road. In Vaughnsville, SR 189 has an intersection with SR 115. Continuing east after SR 189 ends is SR 12. There are no segments of SR 189 that are included as a part of the National Highway System (NHS).

== History ==
The SR 189 designation was applied in 1923. It was originally routed from Columbus Grove to the former SR 5 near Delphos, concurrent with SR 106 east of SR 115. In 1924, SR 189 that was concurrent with SR 106 was removed. SR 189 was rerouted in 1925, to it current route between SR 190 and SR 115. Then, in 1932, the road was extended from SR 190 to SR 66 in Ottoville.

== Major intersections ==
The entire route is in Putnam County.

Location	mi	km	Destinations	Notes
Ottoville	0.00	0.00	US 224 west SR 66	Western terminus at three-way stop T-intersection with flashing beacon; US 224 continues west joined by SR 66, which enters intersection from the south
Ottoville	0.11	0.18	US 224 east	Four-way stop intersection marking eastern split of US 224/SR 66 duplex; US 224 departs to the north
Fort Jennings	3.11	5.01	SR 190 north SR 634 north	T-intersection marking northeastern split of SR 189/SR 190 duplex; SR 190 joins from the northeast, joined by SR 634, whose southern terminus is at this location
Fort Jennings	3.30	5.31	SR 190 south	Southwestern split of SR 189/SR 190 duplex; SR 190 departs to the southwest
Sugar Creek Township	11.58	18.64	SR 12 east SR 115	Eastern terminus at intersection that doubles as western terminus of SR 12; SR 115 crosses south-to-north
1.000 mi = 1.609 km; 1.000 km = 0.621 mi: Concurrency terminus
