= Ohio State Route 277 =

State Route 277

Route information
- Maintained by ODOT

Location
- Country: United States
- State: Ohio

Highway system
- Ohio State Highway System; Interstate; US; State; Scenic
| ← I-277 | → SR 278 |

In Ohio, State Route 277 may refer to:

- Interstate 277 in Ohio, the only Ohio highway numbered 277 since about 1962
- Ohio State Route 277 (1930s-1960s), now SR 207
