= Kansas, Ohio =

- Census-designated place
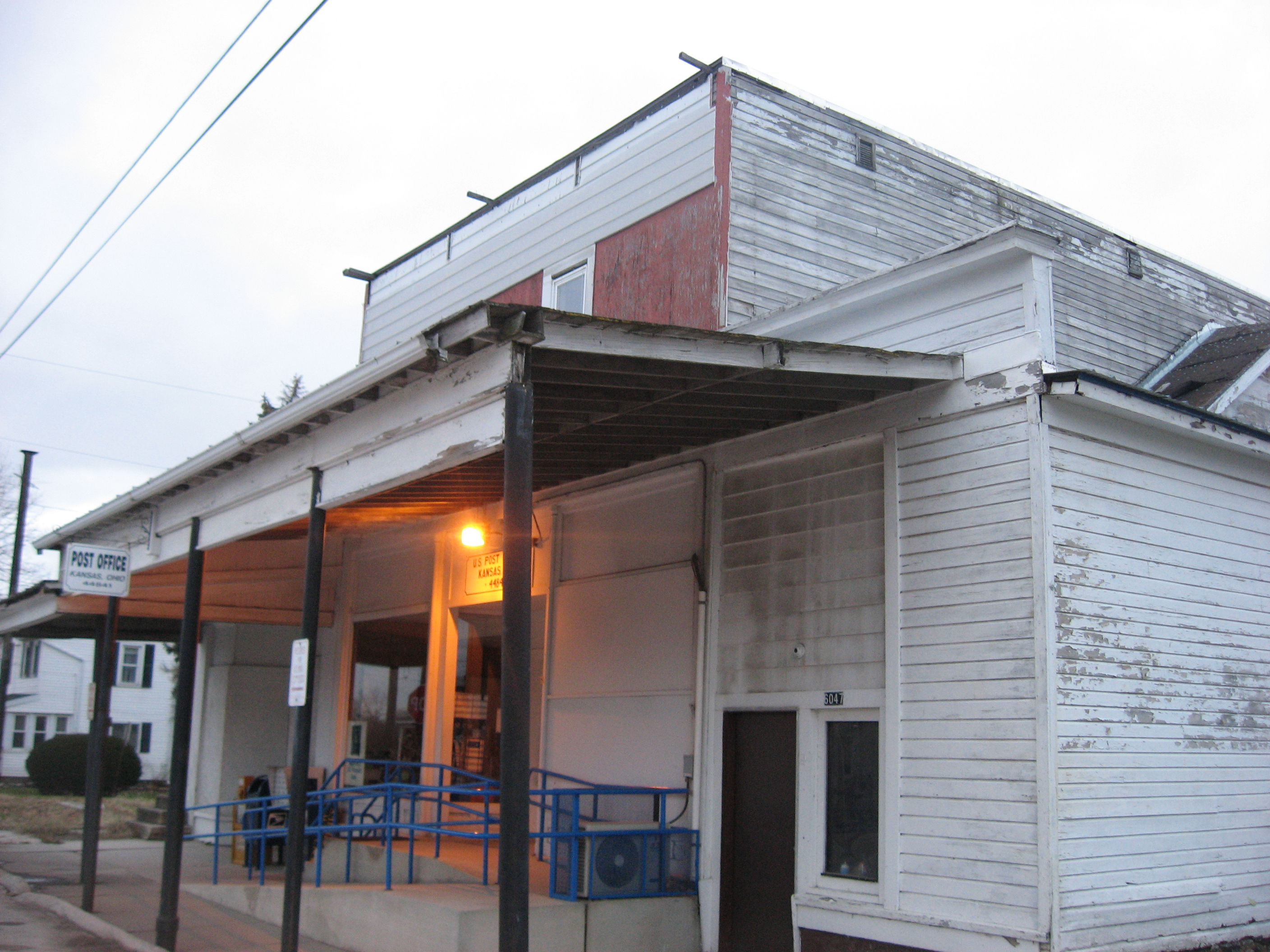
- Community post office

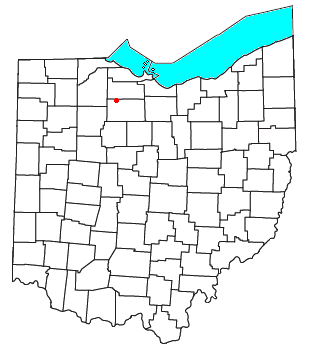
- Location of Kansas, Ohio
- Coordinates: 41°14′55″N 83°17′01″W
- Country: United States
- State: Ohio
- County: Seneca
- Township: Liberty

Area
  - Total: 0.44 sq mi (1.14 km^{2})
  - Land: 0.44 sq mi (1.14 km^{2})
  - Water: 0 sq mi (0.00 km^{2})
- Elevation: 728 ft (222 m)

Population (2020)
  - Total: 175
  - Density: 398.5/sq mi (153.85/km^{2})
- Time zone: UTC-5 (Eastern (EST))
  - Summer (DST): UTC-4 (EDT)
- ZIP codes: 44841
- FIPS code: 39-39578
- GNIS feature ID: 2628908

Kansas is a census-designated place in northwestern Liberty Township, Seneca County, Ohio, United States. It has a post office with the ZIP code 44841. It is located along State Route 635. The population was 175 at the 2020 census.

== History ==
Kansas was platted in early 1855 along a line of the Lake Erie and Louisville Railroad. The community took its name from the Kansas Territory. A short distance south of the community on State Route 635 is the Michaels Farm, which has been named a historic site.

== Demographics ==
Historical population
Census	Pop.	Note	%±
2020	175		—
U.S. Decennial Census
