= U.S. Route 224 =

U.S. Numbered Highway in Indiana, Ohio, and Pennsylvania in the United States

U.S. Route 224
- US 224 highlighted in red

Route information
- Auxiliary route of US 24
- Maintained by INDOT, ODOT, and PennDOT
- Length: 288.21 mi (Note: Total mileage is the sum of each state's mileage) (463.83 km)

Major junctions
- West end: US 24 / SR 5 / SR 9 at Huntington, IN
- I-69 at Markle, IN; US 30 / US 127 at Van Wert, OH; I-75 at Findlay, OH; I-71 / I-76 near Westfield Center, OH; I-76 / I-277 at Akron, OH; I-77 / I-277 at Akron, OH; US 62 / SR 46 in Canfield; SR 11 in Canfield; I-680 at Boardman, OH; I-376 / US 422 at New Castle, PA
- East end: US 422 Bus. / PA 18 at New Castle, PA

Location
- Country: United States
- States: Indiana, Ohio, Pennsylvania
- Counties: IN: Huntington, Wells, Adams; OH: Van Wert, Putnam, Hancock, Seneca, Huron, Ashland, Medina, Summit, Portage, Mahoning; PA: Lawrence

Highway system
- United States Numbered Highway System; List; Special; Divided
- Indiana State Highway System; Interstate; US; State; Scenic
- Ohio State Highway System; Interstate; US; State; Scenic
- Pennsylvania State Route System; Interstate; US; State; Scenic; Legislative
← SR 218	IN	→ SR 225
← SR 223	OH	→ SR 224
← PA 223	PA	→ PA 224

U.S. Route 224 (US 224) is a spur of US 24 that runs through the states of Indiana, Ohio and Pennsylvania. It currently runs for 289 miles (465 km) from US 24 in Huntington, Indiana, east to US 422 Business (US 422 Bus.) and Pennsylvania Route 18 (PA 18) in New Castle, Pennsylvania. It goes through the cities of Canfield, Ohio; Akron, Ohio; and Findlay, Ohio. In Northeast Ohio, US 224 is located a short distance north of the Western Reserve's southern boundary.

== Route description ==
=== Indiana ===
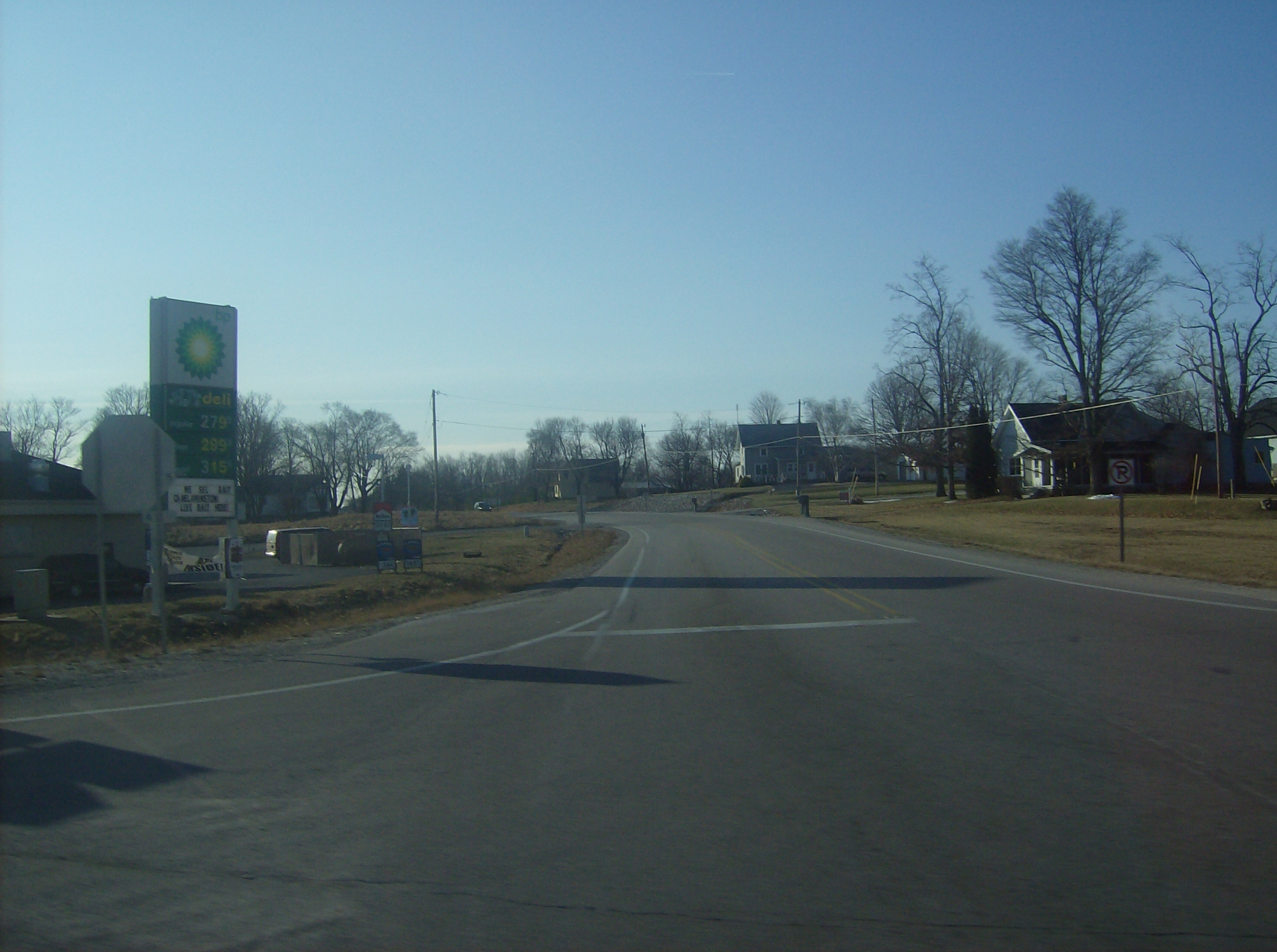
US 224 at its intersection with SR 5 south

From the western terminus at US 24, US 224 heads southeast concurrent with State Road 5 (SR 5). US 224 and SR 5 heads through downtown Huntington as one-way streets, with eastbound on Cherry Street and State Street and westbound on Warren Street. From downtown US 224 and SR 5 head southeast then outside of downtown SR 5 heads due south and US 224 heads east. US 224 passes through Markle where US 224 has an interchange with Interstate 69 (I-69) and intersections with both SR 116 and SR 3. US 224 heads east towards Decatur passing through intersections with SR 301 and SR 1. In Decatur US 224 has a short concurrency with US 27 and US 33. US 224 heads east from Decatur towards Ohio passing through a short concurrency with SR 101.

The only section of U.S. Route 224 in Indiana that is included in the National Highway System is the part concurrent with US 27 and US 33. Traffic reports from the Indiana Department of Transportation in 2010 showed that the lowest traffic levels were the 2,420 vehicles and 670 commercial vehicles using the highway daily near the Ohio state line; the highest traffic levels were the 21,680 vehicles and 1,690 commercial vehicles traveling along the section of US 224 that is concurrent with US 27 and US 33.

=== Ohio ===
West of its concurrency with US 42 near Lodi, US 224 is a rural arterial highway, mostly two lanes, across western Ohio. It runs roughly parallel to the former Baltimore and Ohio Railroad from its westerly US 42 junction to Tiffin, a city around which it sweeps to the south with intersections at various state highways that radiate out from downtown. US 224 passes through a commercial strip on the south side of Willard, and goes through downtown Findlay and Ottawa, but it otherwise specializes in small towns along its course across northwest Ohio. It crosses US 250 east of Greenwich; State Route 4 (SR 4), a major north–south route, at Attica; US 23 south of Fostoria, and I-75 in Findlay, and has brief concurrences with US 127 and US 30 near Van Wert. It crosses the Ashland Railway just east of Willard, the Norfolk Southern Railway at Attica, CSX Transportation near US 23, in Findlay, and in Ottawa, and the Chicago, Fort Wayne and Eastern Railroad west of Van Wert.

East of Lodi, US 224 meets the western terminus of I-76, with which it forms a concurrency. It is in this area, US 224 enters the Connecticut Western Reserve. Less than a mile later, both routes intersect with I-71. US 224 continues along with I-76 to Akron. Here, I-76 exits and heads north. Continuing on US 224, the route runs concurrently with I-277, a short auxiliary highway running through southern Akron. I-277 quickly ends, leaving US 224 to continue into a heavily wooded area. The highway then intersects with SR 43, SR 44, SR 183, SR 225, SR 14, SR 45 and SR 46. Shortly after crossing over SR 11, US 224 enters Boardman Township in Mahoning County, where it eventually crosses a YSRR right of way perpendicularly on its way to the interchange with I-680 before reaching the village of Poland.

This stretch of US 224, through Canfield, Boardman and Poland, is known for its chronic congestion. The original routing of US 224 through the village of Poland turned southeast on Main Street (formerly SR 90, now SR 170) to Riverside Drive, then north on Riverside Drive to the current alignment. In 1954 a bridge was built across Yellow Creek and a new road was constructed from Main Street to Riverside Drive, including an intersection with Water Street (SR 616). As US 224 leaves the village of Poland it continues through rural terrain as it heads towards Pennsylvania.

=== Pennsylvania ===
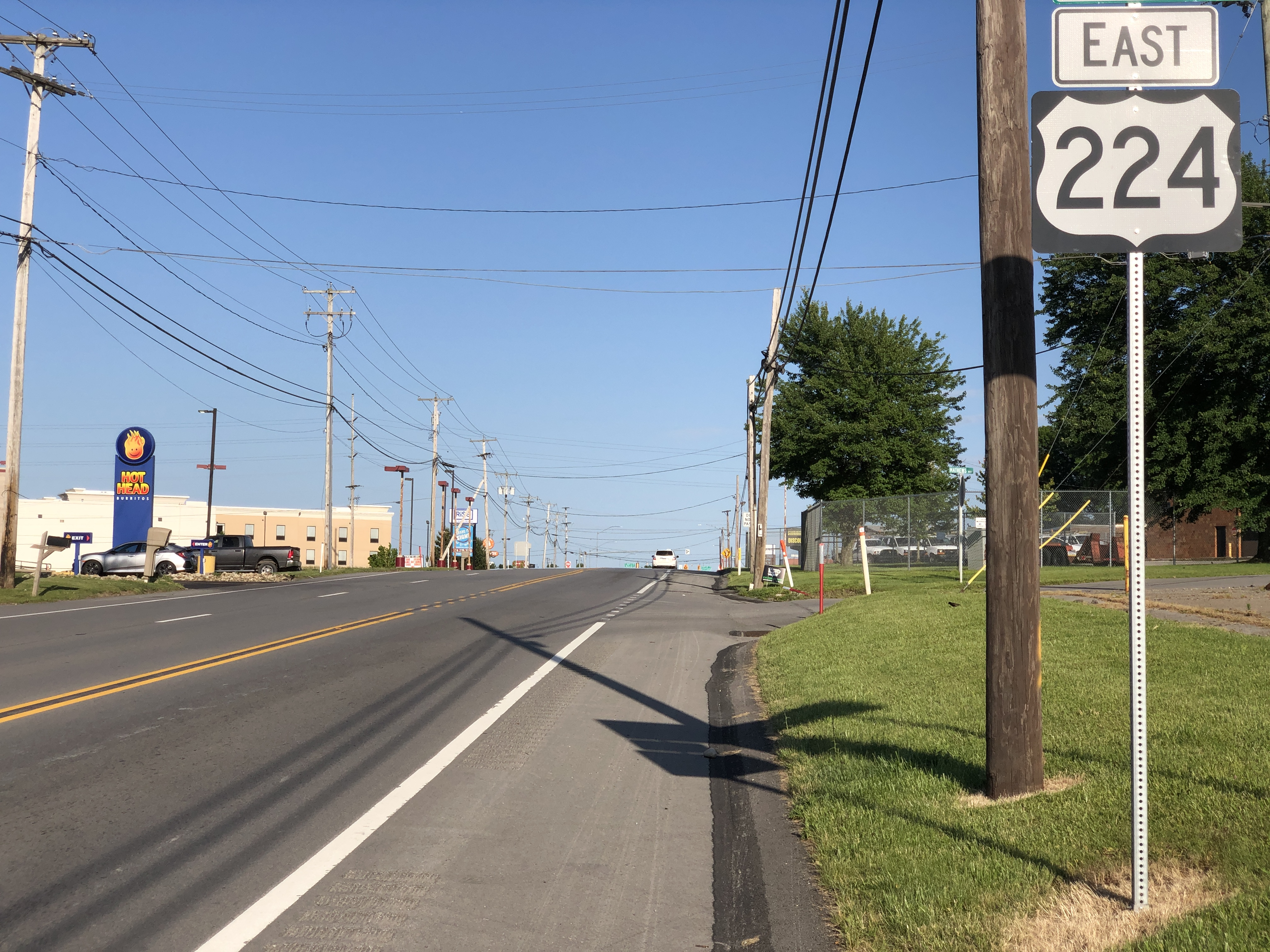
US 224 eastbound in Union Township

US 224 crosses into Mahoning Township in Lawrence County, Pennsylvania, and becomes West State Street, a two-lane, undivided road. The road heads through wooded areas with some homes and commercial establishments, heading to the east-southeast. The route curves to the northeast in Peanut and passes over Norfolk Southern's Youngstown Line, coming to an intersection with PA 551. Here, PA 551 turns northeast to form a concurrency with US 224. The road heads through wooded areas and crosses the Mahoning River and CSX's New Castle Subdivision railroad line. PA 551 splits from US 224 by heading north on North Edinburg Road, with US 224 continuing into wooded areas with some farm fields. The road turns to the southeast and enters Union Township. The route continues through wooded areas with some farmland and homes, passing to the south of New Castle Municipal Airport and heading through the community of Parkstown. US 224 heads into commercial areas, gaining a second lane westbound before widening into a six-lane divided highway as it comes to an interchange with I-376/US 422.

Past this interchange, the road becomes a three-lane road with a center left-turn lane and passes through a mix of residences and businesses, running through the community of Oakwood. The route heads into the city of New Castle and passes through wooded areas of development, gaining a second westbound lane and coming to an intersection with US 422 Business. At this point, US 422 Business turns east to join US 224 on four-lane divided West Falls Street, passing more development and crossing over a New Castle Industrial Railroad line and the Shenango River. The road heads to the east and continues through commercial areas. US 224 ends at an intersection with PA 18, at which point US 422 Business turns south to join that route.

== History ==
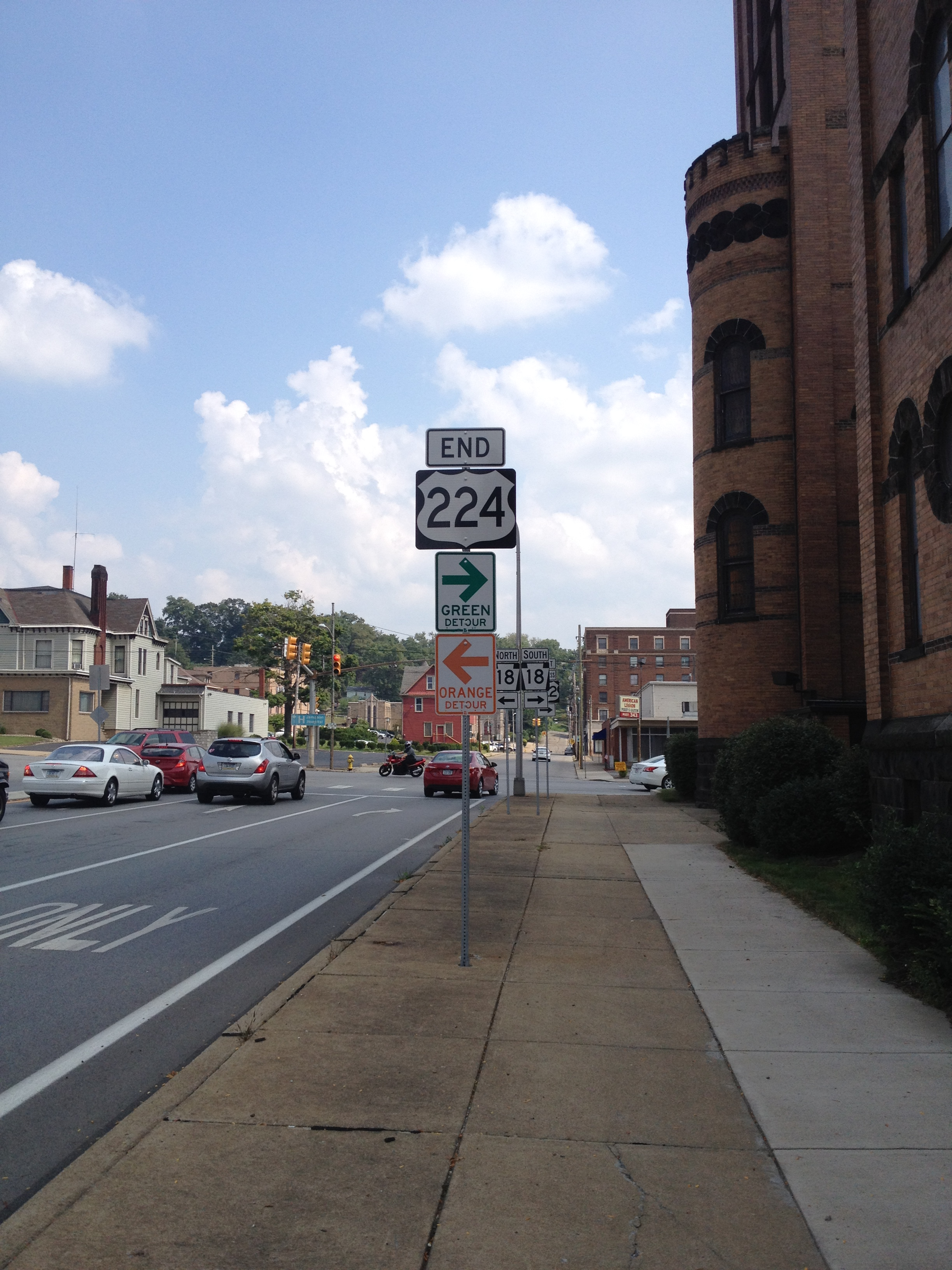
The eastern terminus of US 224 at US 422 Bus. and PA 18 in New Castle, Pennsylvania

US 224 was assigned to a portion of the Benjamin Franklin Highway, an auto trail running from Omaha, Nebraska to Philadelphia, Pennsylvania; its number assignment was an alternative to a westward rerouting of US 422 which runs along the Benjamin Franklin Highway farther east.

When US 224 was commissioned in Indiana in 1934, it replaced State Road 16 (SR 16), from Huntington to the Ohio state line.

Although US 224 is only in Pennsylvania for 10 miles, the eastern terminus has changed several times since 1933, ending at various points in New Castle, Pennsylvania or in adjacent Union Township west of the city. The eastern terminus has been moved five times (1936, 1947, 1974, 1977, 2008), the most notable of which was in the 1970s when the New Castle Bypass opened in 1974 and the state extended US 224 through the city and into Shenango Township at the eastern terminus of the bypass, taking over US 422's old alignment after that highway was moved to the bypass.

The route was truncated back at the current interchange with US 422 and I-376 (then known as PA 60) in 1977 while the old alignment through New Castle was replaced by Business US 422. This would be the case until March 20, 2008, when US 224 was officially extended two miles (3.2 km) to PA 18 inside the New Castle city limits with the placement of new signs. The Pennsylvania Department of Transportation (PennDOT) requested approval from the American Association of State Highway and Transportation Officials (AASHTO) for the extension in August 2007. and received it the following month.

The extension of US 224 marked the second extension of a major highway into downtown New Castle in a little more than a year, as Pennsylvania Route 65 was extended a mile from its previous terminus with Business 422 to the PA 108/PA 168 concurrency in February 2007.

== Future ==
Due to a higher-than-average number of crash-related injuries and fatalities along a stretch of US 224 in Medina County, Ohio, the Ohio Department of Transportation (ODOT) recommended converting three intersections, Vandemark, Westfield and Leroy roads, to restricted crossing U-turns. The highest-priority intersection, with Westfield Road in Westfield Township, was awarded $578,000 in ODOT funding and began construction in May 2019 and finished by the end of summer 2019.

There is a $2.4 million project north of the city of Van Wert to replace the current intersection of US 224, US 127 and Marsh Road (County Road 13) with a roundabout. The project began in January 2022 and was completed in October.

== Major intersections ==
State	County	Location	mi	km	Exit	Destinations	Notes
Indiana	Huntington	Huntington	0.000	0.000		US 24 / SR 5 north / SR 9 – Fort Wayne, Wabash	Western terminus of US 224 and its concurrency with SR 5
Indiana	Huntington	Huntington	3.178	5.114		SR 5 south – Warren, J. Edward Roush Lake	Eastern end of SR 5 concurrency
Indiana	Huntington	Markle	9.895– 10.044	15.924– 16.164		I-69 – Indianapolis, Fort Wayne	I-69 exit 286
Indiana	Huntington	Markle	10.199	16.414		SR 116 east	Western terminus of SR 116
Indiana	Huntington	Markle	10.972	17.658		SR 3 south – Hartford City	Northern terminus of SR 3
Indiana	Wells	Kingsland	20.005	32.195		SR 1 – Fort Wayne, Bluffton	
Indiana	Wells	Lancaster–Jefferson township line	23.947	38.539		SR 301 south – Craigville	Northern terminus of SR 301
Indiana	Adams	Decatur	31.984	51.473		US 27 north / US 33 north	Northern end of US 27/US 33 concurrency
Indiana	Adams	Decatur	32.201	51.822		US 27 south / US 33 south	Southern end of US 27/US 33 concurrency
Indiana	Adams	Union Township	36.240	58.323		SR 101 north – Monroeville	Western end of SR 101 concurrency
Indiana	Adams	Union Township	37.238	59.929		SR 101 south	Eastern end of SR 101 concurrency
			39.377 0.00	63.371 0.00	Indiana–Ohio state line		
Ohio	Van Wert	Harrison Township	1.47	2.37		SR 49 south – Willshire	Western end of SR 49 concurrency
Ohio	Van Wert	Harrison Township	5.10	8.21		SR 49 north – Convoy	Eastern end of SR concurrency
Ohio	Van Wert	Pleasant Township	10.70– 10.98	17.22– 17.67		US 30 west – Fort Wayne	Western end of US 30 concurrency
Ohio	Van Wert	Van Wert	14.50	23.34		US 30 east – Upper Sandusky US 127 south – Celina	Eastern end of US 30 concurrency; southern end of US 127 concurrency
Ohio	Van Wert	Pleasant–Ridge township line	15.85	25.51		US 127 north – Paulding; Marsh Road (CR 13)	Northern end of US 127 concurrency; intersection; scheduled for conversion to roundabout October 2022
Ohio	Van Wert	Hoaglin–Jackson township line	21.68	34.89		SR 637 north	Southern terminus of SR 637
Ohio	Putnam	Monterey Township	27.73	44.63		SR 66 north – Defiance	Western end of SR 66 concurrency
Ohio	Putnam	Ottoville	28.72	46.22		SR 66 south – Delphos; SR 189	Eastern end of SR 66 concurrency; western terminus of SR 189
Ohio	Putnam	Ottoville	28.83	46.40		SR 189 east	Western terminus of SR 189
Ohio	Putnam	Jackson Township	31.67	50.97		SR 634	
Ohio	Putnam	Jackson Township	32.92	52.98		SR 190 south	Northern terminus of SR 190
Ohio	Putnam	Kalida	37.16	59.80		SR 114 west	Eastern terminus of SR 114
Ohio	Putnam	Kalida	37.29	60.01		SR 115 north – Continental	Western end of SR 115 concurrency
Ohio	Putnam	Kalida	37.49	60.33		SR 115 south – Lima	Eastern end of SR 115 concurrency
Ohio	Putnam	Glandorf	45.08	72.55		SR 694 west	Eastern terminus of SR 694
Ohio	Putnam	Ottawa	46.29	74.50		SR 15 north / SR 65 / SR 109 north	Western end of SR 15 concurrency; southern terminus of SR 109
Ohio	Hancock	Blanchard Township	60.58	97.49		SR 235	
Ohio	Hancock	Blanchard Township	62.60	100.74		SR 186 north	Southern terminus of SR 186
Ohio	Hancock	Findlay	67.09	107.97		I-75 / SR 15 south – Toledo, Lima, Upper Sandusky	Eastern end of SR 15 concurrency
Ohio	Hancock	Findlay	69.01	111.06		SR 12 west / SR 37 south	Western end of SR 12 concurrency; northern terminus of SR 37
Ohio	Hancock	Findlay	70.19	112.96		SR 12 east – Fostoria	Eastern end of SR 12 concurrency
Ohio	Seneca	Loudon Township	82.41	132.63		US 23 / SR 199 – Upper Sandusky, Toledo	
Ohio	Seneca	Loudon Township	85.00	136.79		SR 587	
Ohio	Seneca	Tiffin	91.99	148.04		SR 18 – Fostoria, Bellevue	
Ohio	Seneca	Hopewell Township	93.33	150.20		SR 53 – Upper Sandusky, Fremont	
Ohio	Seneca	Clinton Township	94.87	152.68		SR 231	
Ohio	Seneca	Clinton–Eden township line	96.10	154.66		SR 100 – Bucyrus	
Ohio	Seneca	Scipio Township	101.19	162.85		SR 67 – Upper Sandusky	
Ohio	Seneca	Scipio Township	103.30	166.25		SR 19 – Bucyrus, Fremont	
Ohio	Seneca	Attica	110.23	177.40		SR 4 – Bucyrus, Marion, Sandusky	
Ohio	Huron	Willard	118.63	190.92		SR 103	
Ohio	Huron	Willard	119.51	192.33		SR 99 north	Southern terminus of SR 99
Ohio	Huron	Willard	121.84	196.08		SR 61 / SR 598	
Ohio	Huron	Greenwich Township	132.09	212.58		SR 13	
Ohio	Ashland	Ruggles Township	135.63	218.28		US 250	
Ohio	Ashland	Ruggles Township	136.94	220.38		SR 60	
Ohio	Ashland	Nova	141.53	227.77		SR 511	
Ohio	Ashland	Sullivan	145.86	234.74		SR 58	
Ohio	Medina	Homerville	150.87	242.80		SR 301	
Ohio	Medina	Lodi	154.77	249.08		US 42 west / SR 421 east	Southern end of US 42 concurrency; western terminus of SR 421
Ohio	Medina	Lodi	157.41	253.33		SR 83	
Ohio	Medina	Lodi	158.89	255.71		US 42 east / SR 421 west	Northern end of US 42 concurrency; eastern end of SR 421
Ohio	Medina	Westfield Center	164.26	264.35	1	I-76 west to I-71 – Columbus, Cleveland	Western end of I–76 concurrency; western terminus of I–76; I-71 exit 209
Ohio	Medina	Westfield Center	166.12	267.34	2	SR 3	
Ohio	Medina	Wadsworth	174.52	280.86	7	SR 57	
Ohio	Medina	Wadsworth	173.56	279.32	9	SR 94	
Ohio	Medina	Wadsworth	175.56	282.54	11	SR 261	
Ohio	Summit	Norton	177.12	285.05	13	SR 21	
Ohio	Summit	Norton	178.45	287.19	14	Cleveland Massillon Road	
Ohio	Summit	Norton	179.99	289.67	16	Barber Road	
Ohio	Summit	Barberton	181.33	291.82	17	To; SR 619 south / State Street/East Avenue/Kenmore Boulevard	Full Interchange, Westbound must Exit onto State St & Enter I-76 East Ramp
Ohio	Summit	Akron	181.63	292.31	17	SR 619 south / East Avenue/Kenmore Boulevard	Closed in 2022, all traffic was sent to State Street exit
Ohio	Summit	Akron	182.14	293.13	18; 1	I-76 east I-277	Eastern end of I–76 concurrency; western end of I–277 concurrency; western terminus of I–277
Ohio	Summit	Akron	183.29– 183.48	294.98– 295.28	2	SR 93	
Ohio	Summit	Akron	184.61	297.10	3	South Main Street	
Ohio	Summit	Akron	185.88	299.14	4	I-77 / I-277	Eastern end of I–277 concurrency; signed as exits 4A (south) & 4B (north); eastern terminus of I–277; I-77 exit 122
Ohio	Summit	Akron	186.88	300.75		Kelly Avenue	
Ohio	Summit	Akron	187.35	301.51		Air Dock Access Road/Emmitt Road	Eastbound exit and entrance only
Ohio	Summit	Akron	188.03	302.60		SR 241	
Ohio	Summit	Springfield Township	190.08	305.90		SR 91 north	Southern terminus of SR 91
Ohio	Summit–Portage county line	Springfield–Suffield township line	191.90	308.83		SR 532 north	Southern terminus of SR 532
Ohio	Portage	Suffield Township	194.32	312.73		SR 43	
Ohio	Portage	Randolph Township	199.61	321.24		SR 44	
Ohio	Portage	Atwater	204.89	329.74		SR 183 north	Northern end of SR 183 concurrency
Ohio	Portage	Atwater	205.42	330.59		SR 183	Eastern end of SR 193 concurrency
Ohio	Portage		208.00	334.74		SR 225 south	Western end of SR 225 concurrency
Ohio	Portage	Deerfield Township	210.49	338.75		SR 14 / SR 225 north	Eastern end of SR 225 concurrency
Ohio	Mahoning	Berlin Township	215.98	347.59		SR 534	
Ohio	Mahoning	Ellsworth	220.70	355.18		SR 45	
Ohio	Mahoning	Canfield	224.72	361.65		SR 446 south	Northern terminus of SR 446
Ohio	Mahoning	Canfield	225.76	363.33		US 62 / SR 46	
Ohio	Mahoning	Canfield	226.88	365.13		SR 11	
Ohio	Mahoning	Boardman Township	228.38	367.54		SR 625 north	Southern terminus of SR 625
Ohio	Mahoning	Boardman Township	230.91	371.61		SR 7	
Ohio	Mahoning	Boardman Township	232.77	374.61		I-680	I-680 exit 11
Ohio	Mahoning	Poland	233.43	375.67		SR 170	
Ohio	Mahoning	Poland	233.54	375.85		SR 616	
			238.43 0.00	383.72 0.00	Ohio–Pennsylvania state line		
Pennsylvania	Lawrence	Mahoning Township	4.33	6.97		PA 551 south (Jackson Street)	Western end of PA 551 concurrency
Pennsylvania	Lawrence	Mahoning Township	4.95	7.97		PA 551 north (North Edinburg Road)	Eastern end of PA 551 concurrency
Pennsylvania	Lawrence	Union Township	7.86	12.65		I-376 / US 422 (Benjamin Franklin Highway) – Sharon, Butler, Pittsburgh	I-376/US 422 exit 13; former eastern terminus of US 224 (1977–2008)
Pennsylvania	Lawrence	New Castle	8.91	14.34		US 422 Bus. west (Sampson Street) to US 422 west – Youngstown, OH	Western end of US 422 Bus. concurrency
Pennsylvania	Lawrence	New Castle	10.15	16.33		US 422 Bus. east / PA 18 (North Jefferson Street)	Eastern terminus of US 224 and its concurrency with US 422 Bus.
1.000 mi = 1.609 km; 1.000 km = 0.621 mi: Concurrency terminus; Incomplete access
