= Ohio State Route 115 =

State highway in western Ohio, US

State Route 115

Route information
- Maintained by ODOT
- Length: 21.71 mi (34.94 km)
- Existed: 1923–present

Major junctions
- South end: SR 65 in Lima
- US 30 near Lima; US 224 in Kalida
- North end: SR 15 near Continental

Location
- Country: United States
- State: Ohio
- Counties: Allen, Putnam

Highway system
- Ohio State Highway System; Interstate; US; State; Scenic
← SR 114	→ SR 116

State Route 115 (SR 115) is a 21.71-mile (34.94 km) long north–south state highway in the western portion of the U.S. state of Ohio. The highway has its southern terminus at a T-intersection with SR 65 in the northernmost portion of the city of Lima. The northern terminus of SR 115 is at a T-intersection with SR 15 approximately 3.75 miles (6.04 km) southeast of the village of Continental.

== Route description ==
SR 115 traverses the northern portion of Allen County and the western half of Putnam County. No section of this state route is included within the National Highway System (NHS). The NHS is a network of highways considered to be most important for the nation's economy, mobility and defense.

== History ==
SR 115 made its debut in 1923. When it was first designated, SR 115 utilized all of its current alignment, then proceeded to the northwest from its present northern terminus a short distance along the current SR 15, then known as SR 22, to the County Road 18 (CR 18) intersection. It then followed CR 18 north into Henry County to CR B, where it turned east, and followed CR B a short distance. At CR 17, SR 115 turned north, and followed the county road a short distance to the CR 16C intersection. The state route then followed CR 16C northeast into Holgate, where it ran along Wilhelm Street up to the point where it came to an end at its junction with what is now SR 108, but at the time designated as SR 188.

SR 115 would take on its current shape in 1969 when all of the highway from its present northern terminus at SR 15 to SR 108 in Holgate was removed from the state highway system. The concurrent portion with SR 15 became just SR 15, while jurisdiction of all other portions of the former SR 115 was turned over to Putnam and Henry Counties.

In May 2024, the Ohio Department of Transportation began repairing the slope along Sugar Creek, located approximately one-mile southeast of U.S. 30 and one-mile northwest of State Route 65. A culvert for drainage under State Route 115 at the same location began to be replaced. The project is estimated to end in September 2024. State Route 15 between Cole St. and State Route 65 closed on May 13 for approximately 90 days because of the work.

== Major intersections ==
County	Location	mi	km	Destinations	Notes
Allen	Lima	0.00	0.00	SR 65	Southern terminus at T-intersection
Allen	Sugar Creek Township	2.65	4.26	US 30	Diamond interchange
Putnam	Sugar Creek Township	6.61	10.64	SR 12 east SR 189 west	Eastern terminus of SR 189 and western terminus of SR 12
Putnam	Kalida	14.34	23.08	US 224 east	Southeastern split of US 224/SR 115 duplex; US 224 joins from the northeast
Putnam	Kalida	14.54	23.40	US 224 west SR 114 west	Signalized intersection marking northwestern split of US 224/SR 115 duplex and eastern terminus of SR 114; US 224 departs to the southwest, duplexed with SR 114
Putnam	Greensburg Township	17.70	28.49	SR 694	
Putnam	Palmer Township	21.71	34.94	SR 15	Northern terminus at T-intersection
1.000 mi = 1.609 km; 1.000 km = 0.621 mi: Concurrency terminus
