= Ohio State Route 633 =

State highway in Lake County, Ohio, US

State Route 633
- Lloyd Road

Route information
- Maintained by ODOT
- Length: 0.58 mi (930 m)
- Existed: 1930s–present

Major junctions
- South end: US 20 in Wickliffe
- North end: Lakeland Boulevard in Wickliffe

Location
- Country: United States
- State: Ohio
- Counties: Lake

Highway system
- Ohio State Highway System; Interstate; US; State; Scenic
| ← SR 632 | → SR 634 |

State Route 633 (SR 633) is a short north–south state highway in the northeastern portion of the U.S. state of Ohio. Occupying a portion of Lloyd Road, SR 633 has its southern terminus at a signalized intersection with U.S. Route 20 (US 20) in Wickliffe. Its northern terminus is also in Wickliffe, but at a signalized intersection with Lakeland Boulevard (former SR 2), which provides access to current SR 2 freeway by way of a trumpet interchange just to the east.

== Route description ==
The entirety of SR 633 is located within the city limits of Wickliffe in Lake County. The state route begins at a signalized intersection with US 20 (Euclid Avenue), and travels to the northwest from that point. It is bounded by a commercial real estate on the west side, and some small fields and woods on the east side through the Anderson Road intersection, after which commercial businesses appear on that side, as well. SR 633 then crosses a set of CSX and Norfolk Southern railroad tracks. Just after that crossing, the state highway comes to an end at a signalized intersection with Lakeland Boulevard, just three blocks southwest of a trumpet interchange that connects the SR 2 freeway with Lakeland Boulevard. Lloyd Road continues northwest after SR 633 terminates. It crosses underneath SR 2 a very short distance after the intersection. About 6,320 vehicles travel on SR 633 on average every day. For its entire length, SR 633 is a three-lane roadway, featuring one through lane in each direction plus a center-turn lane.

== History ==
The 1923 Ohio Department of Highways map shows a road running along the corridor of modern SR 2 from Cleveland to Wickliffe, then turning south along the route of Lloyd Road to US 20 in Wickliffe. This routing is designated as a state highway by the 1932 map. On the 1939 map, the northeast–southwest road, now labelled as SR 2, is extended eastward, but the Lloyd Road section is still designated as a state highway. Starting with the 1940 Lake county map, this segment is labelled SR 633. In approximately 1963, SR 2 is rerouted onto the Lakeland Freeway, but SR 633's terminus remains at Lakeland Boulevard.

== Major intersections ==
The entire route is in Wickliffe, Lake County.

| mi | km | Destinations | Notes |
|---|---|---|---|
| 0.00 | 0.00 | US 20 (Euclid Avenue) to I-90 | |
| 0.58 | 0.93 | Lakeland Boulevard to SR 2 | Former routing of SR 2 |
1.000 mi = 1.609 km; 1.000 km = 0.621 mi
