= Ohio State Route 421 =

State highway in Medina County, Ohio, US

State Route 421

Route information
- Maintained by ODOT
- Length: 3.37 mi (5.42 km)
- Existed: 1959–present

Major junctions
- West end: US 42 / US 224 near Lodi
- East end: US 42 / US 224 near Lodi

Location
- Country: United States
- State: Ohio
- Counties: Medina

Highway system
- Ohio State Highway System; Interstate; US; State; Scenic
← SR 420	→ US 422

State Route 421 (SR 421) is a two-lane east-west state highway in the north-central portion of Ohio. Existing entirely within Medina County, SR 421's endpoints are at opposite ends of the concurrency of U.S. Route 42 (US 42) and US 224, which together form the four-lane bypass of Lodi. SR 421 serves both as a de facto business route for US 42 and US 224 for Lodi, as well as a connector between the two U.S. routes and SR 83, which SR 421 intersects in downtown Lodi.

== Route description ==
SR 421 begins at a four-ramp parclo interchange in Harrisville Township that also doubles as the western split of the concurrency of US 42 and US 224. The first mile (1.6 km) of SR 421 is predominantly rural, amid a mixed landscape of farmland and woods. In this stretch, the state highway closely parallels the CSX railway that runs to the north of the route. It also crosses the East Fork of the Black River through this area. At SR 421's intersection with Lodi Road, the pre-1959 routing of US 42 southwest of Lodi, the highway briefly turns north to pass underneath the CSX railway and into Lodi, then immediately shifts to the northeast, as the rural landscape gives way to a primarily residential setting. After bending to the east-northeast, SR 421 crossing a second set of railroad tracks, then passes several more houses prior to its junction with SR 83 in downtown Lodi. From here, SR 421 turns to the northeast, and continues through a residential area where it passes numerous side streets through its intersection with Redfield Street. After passing some businesses, the highway meets Highland Drive at a flashing beacon intersection, then enters into a wooded area lined with a few homes upon departing Lodi and re-entering Harrisville Township. SR 421 soon arrives at its endpoint at an interchange that doubles as the eastern split of the US 42/US 224 concurrency.

No portion of SR 421 is included within the National Highway System.

== History ==
With the completion of the Lodi Bypass in 1959, US 42 and US 224, which were both formerly routed into Lodi, were routed onto the new four-lane expressway. The SR 421 designation came into being that year, being applied to the former US 224 from the new bypass to the west of the village to the former southwestern junction with US 42, the former concurrency of US 42 and US 224 into downtown Lodi, and the former US 42 from the northeastern junction with US 224 in downtown Lodi to the new bypass northeast of the village. No major changes have been made to the routing of SR 421 since its designation.

== Major intersections ==
The entire route is in Medina County.

Location	mi	km	Destinations	Notes
Harrisville Township	0.00	0.00	US 42 / US 224 (Greenwich Road) – Findlay, Ashland	Interchange
Lodi	2.18	3.51	SR 83 (Wooster Street / Elyria Street)	
Harrisville Township	3.37	5.42	US 42 (Lafayette Road) / US 224 – Akron, Medina	Interchange
1.000 mi = 1.609 km; 1.000 km = 0.621 mi
