= Vaughnsville, Ohio =

- CDP
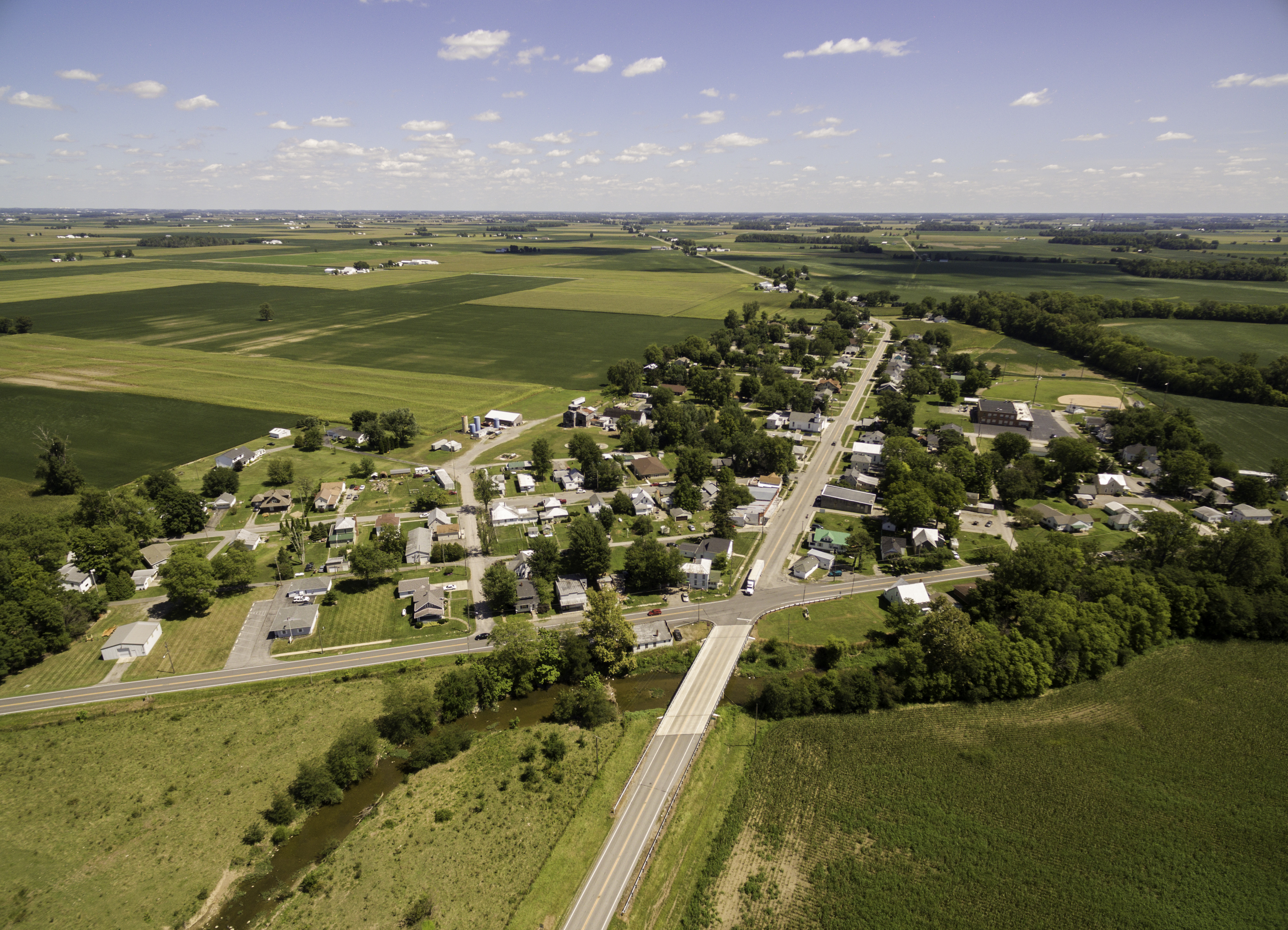
- Aerial view of Vaughnsville

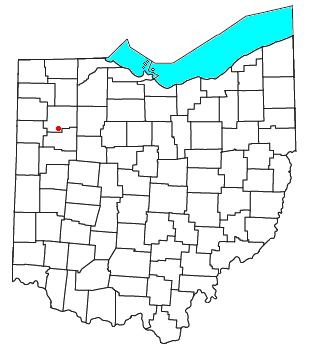
- Location of Vaugnsville, Ohio
- Coordinates: 40°52′54″N 84°09′02″W
- Country: United States
- State: Ohio
- County: Putnam
- Township: Sugar Creek
- Elevation: 768 ft (234 m)

Population (2020)
  - Total: 278
- Time zone: UTC-5 (Eastern (EST))
  - Summer (DST): UTC-4 (EDT)
- ZIP: 45893
- GNIS feature ID: 2628982

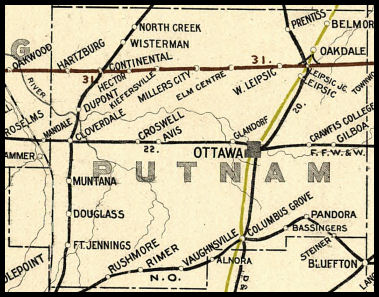
1898 Map of Putnam County Ohio Railroad Stations

Vaughnsville (/ˈvɔːnzvɪl/ VAWNZ-vil) is an unincorporated community and census-designated place (CDP) in Sugar Creek Township, Putnam County, Ohio, United States. The population was 278 at the 2020 census. It has a post office with the ZIP code 45893. It lies along State Route 115 at its intersection with State Routes 12 and 189.

== History ==
Vaughnsville was originally called Monterey, and under the latter name was laid out in 1847. An addition was made by Daniel C. Vaughn, who gave the town his name. A post office called Vaughnsville has been in operation since 1848.

Vaughnsville's most unusual claim to fame is its (contested) status as the first location in the World to use individual communion cups for the Lord's Supper. John G. Thomas—a physician and pastor of the Vaughnsville Congregational Church—designed a communion outfit after noticing "a communicant with a diseased mouth condition". Thomas applied for a patent for his invention on August 2, 1893, in which he wrote that he "invented certain new and useful improvements in communion service" which would "provide an individual or separate cup for the use of each person at the celebration of the Lord’s Supper, commonly called the communion service…" (Serial No. 482,186). According to The Lima News, Thomas and his church elders first experimented with the individual cups "sometime during 1893" (January 16, 1955, p. 5B). The patent for his invention was granted on March 6, 1894, and marked the first time an individual cup service received letters patent in the United States (Patent No. 516,065). Thomas moved to Lima and started the Thomas Communion Service Company in 1893 and it was sold in 1972.

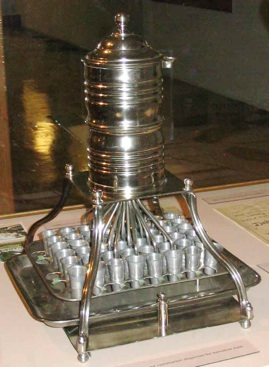
The original communion wine dispenser invented by Rev John G. Thomas. Exhibited at Allen County Museum, Lima, Ohio.

For many years the Northern Ohio Railroad maintained a passenger and freight station in Vaughnsville, and later a telegraph outlet, later Northern Ohio Railroad was bought by the Akron, Canton and Youngstown Railroad, Trains #90/95 were known as the "Delphos Bullet", it was a mixed use train of freight and passenger that ran the entire 165 mile run from Akron to Delphos. The last run of this trip was on July 20, 1951, and was Ohio's last mixed train. The tracks were abandoned soon after and removed completely in the 80's.

The first grist mill in the county was constructed in 1831 by Benjamin Clevenger on the east bank of Sugar Creek where Vaughnsville is today. In 1832 Clevenger made a road to Lima from Vaughnsville. Shortly after the Civil War, the first stone pike was laid in Sugar Creek township, which today is State Route 115. In 1915 Vaughnsville had The Vaughnsville Banking Company, a branch of the People's Banking Company of Columbus Grove, an elevator, saw-mill and a grocery store owned by Frank E. Roberts which was later known as the C & B store.

Vaughnsville had a middle and high school until it was consolidated with Columbus Grove in 1962. The original school house was built in 1908 at a cost of $15,000. An addition that doubled the school capacity was made in 1915 for $11,000.

== Geography ==
Soil is mostly of the Vaughnsville loam / Hoytville-Napanee type which occurs along the bases of an old glacial-lake beaches southwest of Vaughnsville, northeast of Pandora, and southeast of Leipsic. It warms up early in the spring and easy to manage. This type of soil is neutral to slightly acid and run-off is slow to moderate. This type of soil is prime farmland if drained, commonly used with corn, soybeans, and small grain.

The USDA Plant Hardiness gives Vaughnsville a Zone 6a -10 to -5 (F) The predominant tree species are ash, hickory, sugar maple, Northern red oak and red maple.

The local bedrock consists primarily of Silurian dolomite and shale.

=== Topography ===
Vaughnsville lies at 761 feet (232 meters) above sea level with flat terrain.

== Climate ==
Vaughnsville has a humid continental climate, classified as Dfa by the Köppen-Geiger system with cool to cold winters and humid hot summers, this climate type only exists in the Northern Hemisphere.

Vaughnsville average rainfall is 35 inches / 886 m and the average temperature is 49.6 °F (9.8 °C) per year. Vaughnsville has had an average annual snowfall of 13.8 inches over the last 30 years. On average, there are 180 sunny days per year and any measurable precipitation is 114 days in Vaughnsville, Ohio. The July high is around 84 degrees. The January low is 18. The record rainfall for one day in Vaughnsville is 8.14 inches on August 19, 2007. The all-time high was 109.04 °F on July 14, 1936, with the all-time low -23.08 °F on February 26, 1963.

Local extreme records follow:

=== Record highs By month ===
Month	Record High	Record High Date
January	77.0°	January 21, 1906
February	73.0°	February 25, 2000
March	86.0°	March 21, 2012
April	90.0°	April 29, 1899
May	96.1°	May 17, 1962
June	102.9°	June 25, 1988
July	109.0°	July 14, 1936
August	104.0°	August 27, 1948
September	100.9°	September 15, 1939
October	93.0°	October 3, 1898
November	79.0°	November 1, 1933
December	71.1°	December 2, 1982

=== Record lows by month ===
Month	Record Low	Record Low Date
January	-20.9°	January 19, 1994
February	-23.1°	February 26, 1963
March	-13.0°	March 9, 1984
April	6.1°	April 7, 1982
May	25.0°	May 7, 1974
June	36.0°	June 2, 1910
July	41.0°	July 10, 1898
August	36.0°	August 29, 1965
September	24.1°	September 29, 1893
October	15.1°	October 30, 1895
November	-2.9°	November 30, 1958
December	-18.9°	December 22, 1989

=== Monthly averages and records 1981–2010 ===
Date	Average Low	Average High	Average Precipitation	Average Snow
January	18°	33°	2.22"	3.7"
February	22°	37°	1.98"	4"
March	30°	48°	2.68"	1.4"
April	39°	60°	3.46"	0.8"
May	50°	72°	3.89"	NA
June	59°	80°	4.05"	NA
July	63°	84°	4.26"	NA
August	62°	81°	3.38"	NA
September	55°	76°	3.07"	NA
October	44°	64°	2.41"	0.1"
November	34°	50°	3.12"	0.6"
December	24°	38°	2.68"	3.2"

=== Record daily precipitation records ===
Date	Maximum Precipitation
August 19, 2007	8.14 in.
August 21, 2007	6.19 in.
July 8, 1997	4.91 in.
August 16, 1997	4.85 in.
June 14, 1981	4.16 in.

=== Severe weather ===
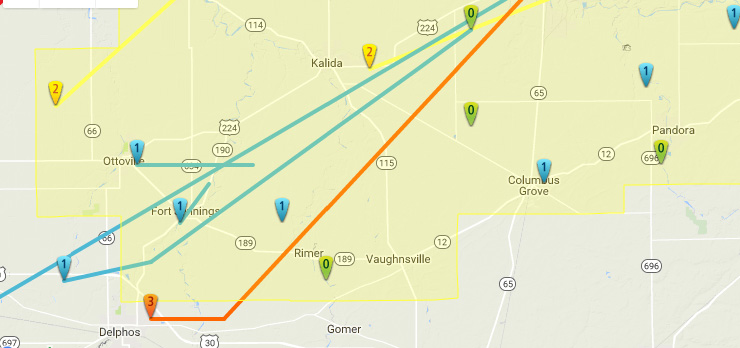
Tornados near Vaughnsville since 1950

Vaughnsville is covered by the National Weather Service in Northern Indiana (IWX) and Wilmington, Ohio (ILN) with radar from KIWX North Webster. The nearest weather station is at Lima Allen County Airport (KAOH).

A derecho took place on June 29, 2012. An intense line of thunderstorms or derecho developed over northern Indiana during the middle of the afternoon and then raced southeast across the central portion of Ohio. Widespread damage was reported from Findlay to Marion to Mount Vernon, with many trees and some barns damaged around Vaughnsville.

No tornados have hit Vaughnsville in known records. The nearest has been an F0 tornado to the southwest on June 8, 1993, 2:30 pm.
