= Dupont, Ohio =

- Village
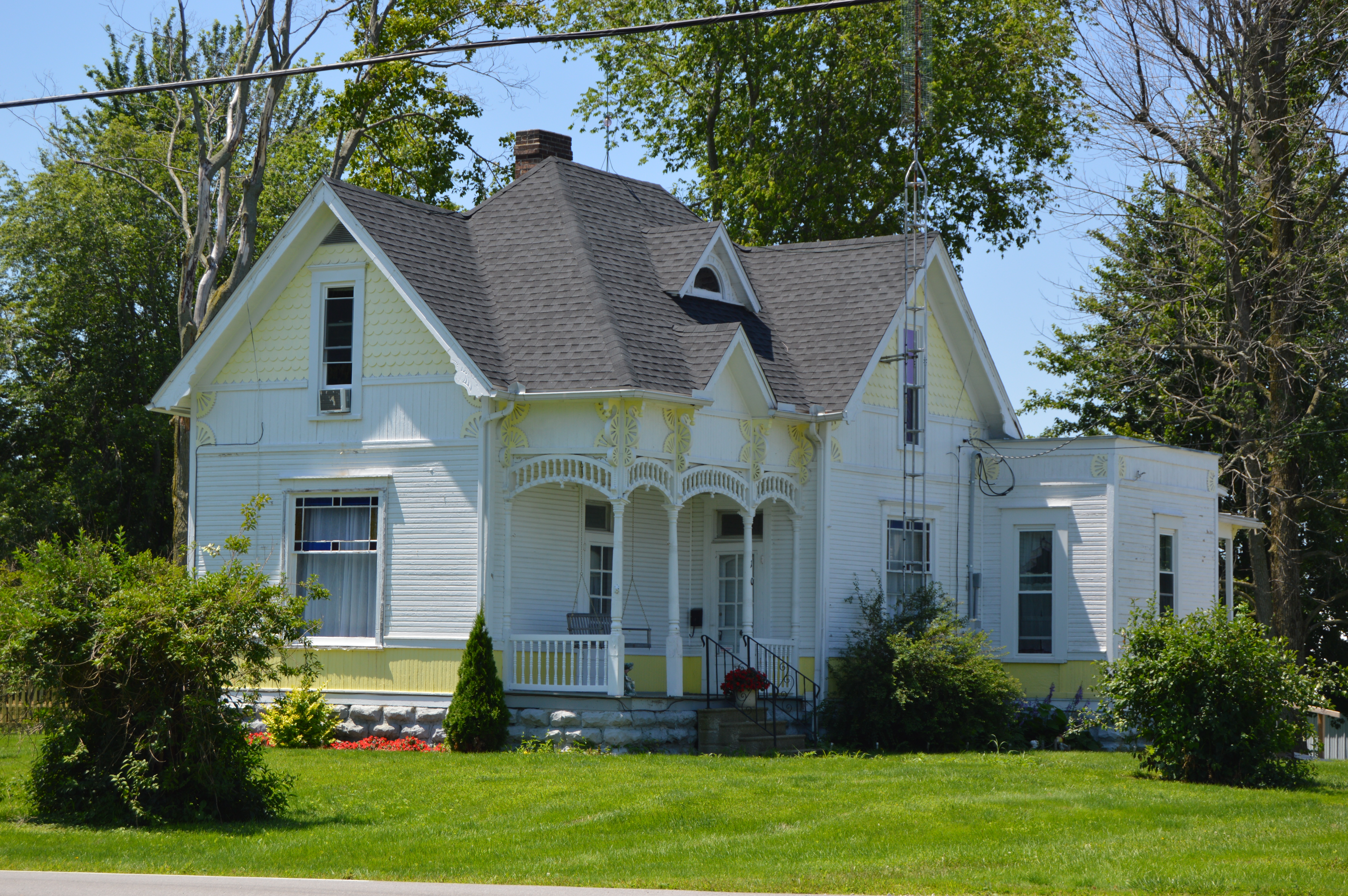
- Stick-Eastlake cottage on River Street

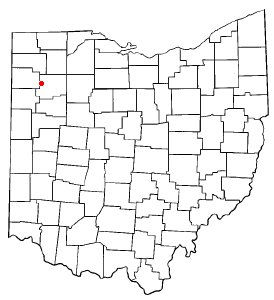
- Location of Dupont, Ohio

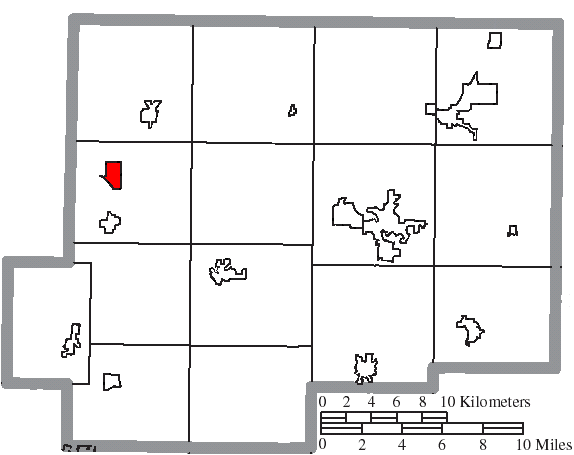
- Location of Dupont in Putnam County
- Coordinates: 41°03′17″N 84°18′04″W
- Country: United States
- State: Ohio
- County: Putnam

Area
  - Total: 0.92 sq mi (2.37 km^{2})
  - Land: 0.91 sq mi (2.36 km^{2})
  - Water: 0.0039 sq mi (0.01 km^{2})
- Elevation: 725 ft (221 m)

Population (2020)
  - Total: 212
  - Estimate (2023): 206
  - Density: 232.2/sq mi (89.65/km^{2})
- Time zone: UTC-5 (Eastern (EST))
  - Summer (DST): UTC-4 (EDT)
- ZIP code: 45837
- Area code: 419
- FIPS code: 39-22974
- GNIS feature ID: 2398760

Dupont is a village in Putnam County, Ohio, United States. The population was 212 at the 2020 census.

== History ==
Dupont was platted in 1877 when the Toledo, Delphos, and Indianapolis Railway was extended to that point. The village was named for Samuel Francis Du Pont, a United States Navy admiral in the Mexican War. Dupont was incorporated as a village in 1888.

== Geography ==
According to the United States Census Bureau, the village has a total area of 0.93 square miles (2.41 km^{2}), all land.

== Demographics ==
Historical population
Census	Pop.	Note	%±
1880	165		—
1890	531		221.8%
1900	370		−30.3%
1910	334		−9.7%
1920	270		−19.2%
1930	206		−23.7%
1940	217		5.3%
1950	225		3.7%
1960	239		6.2%
1970	302		26.4%
1980	308		2.0%
1990	279		−9.4%
2000	268		−3.9%
2010	318		18.7%
2020	212		−33.3%
2023 (est.)	206	▼	−2.8%
U.S. Decennial Census

=== 2010 census ===
As of the census of 2010, there were 318 people, 134 households, and 86 families living in the village. The population density was 341.9 inhabitants per square mile (132.0/km^{2}). There were 141 housing units at an average density of 151.6 per square mile (58.5/km^{2}). The racial makeup of the village was 99.4% White and 0.6% Native American. Hispanic or Latino of any race were 0.9% of the population.

There were 134 households, of which 25.4% had children under the age of 18 living with them, 43.3% were married couples living together, 13.4% had a female householder with no husband present, 7.5% had a male householder with no wife present, and 35.8% were non-families. 29.9% of all households were made up of individuals, and 8.9% had someone living alone who was 65 years of age or older. The average household size was 2.37 and the average family size was 2.92.

The median age in the village was 39.6 years. 18.6% of residents were under the age of 18; 8.1% were between the ages of 18 and 24; 32.1% were from 25 to 44; 31.4% were from 45 to 64; and 9.7% were 65 years of age or older. The gender makeup of the village was 51.9% male and 48.1% female.

=== 2000 census ===
As of the census of 2000, there were 268 people, 93 households, and 70 families living in the village. The population density was 287.8 inhabitants per square mile (111.1/km^{2}). There were 102 housing units at an average density of 109.5 per square mile (42.3/km^{2}). The racial makeup of the village was 97.01% White, 2.24% African American and 0.75% Native American. Hispanic or Latino of any race were 2.24% of the population.

There were 93 households, out of which 44.1% had children under the age of 18 living with them, 55.9% were married couples living together, 17.2% had a female householder with no husband present, and 23.7% were non-families. 23.7% of all households were made up of individuals, and 8.6% had someone living alone who was 65 years of age or older. The average household size was 2.88 and the average family size was 3.41.

In the village, the population was spread out, with 34.7% under the age of 18, 8.6% from 18 to 24, 30.2% from 25 to 44, 17.5% from 45 to 64, and 9.0% who were 65 years of age or older. The median age was 29 years. For every 100 females there were 103.0 males. For every 100 females age 18 and over, there were 92.3 males.

The median income for a household in the village was $31,786, and the median income for a family was $37,500. Males had a median income of $32,813 versus $21,250 for females. The per capita income for the village was $12,879. About 8.6% of families and 7.7% of the population were below the poverty line, including 8.7% of those under the age of eighteen and none of those 65 or over.
