= Interstate 277 (Ohio) =

Highway in Ohio

Interstate 277
- I-277 highlighted in red

Route information
- Auxiliary route of I-77
- Maintained by ODOT
- Length: 4.14 mi (6.66 km)
- Existed: 1970–present
- NHS: Entire route

Major junctions
- West end: I-76 / US 224 in Akron
- SR 93 in Akron
- East end: I-77 / US 224 in Coventry Township

Location
- Country: United States
- State: Ohio
- Counties: Summit

Highway system
- Interstate Highway System; Main; Auxiliary; Suffixed; Business; Future; Ohio State Highway System; Interstate; US; State; Scenic
← SR 276	→ SR 277

Interstate 277 (I-277) is a 4.14-mile (6.66 km) auxiliary Interstate Highway connecting I-76 and I-77 in Akron, Ohio. It was completed in 1970 and shares its entire length with U.S. Route 224 (US 224).

== Route description ==
I-277 begins at an interchange with I-76. I-277 heads east toward I-77 as a six-lane highway. The interstate turns toward the southeast and has an interchange with State Route 93 (SR 93). I-277 has one more interchange with South Main Street before it interchanges with I-77 and its designation ends. The freeway continues as US 224.

== History ==
The western portion of I-77 originally joined I-76 with Waterloo Road and was opened in 1962. The remainder of the Interstate was completed in 1970.

== Exit list ==
The entire route is in Summit County.

Location	mi	km	Exit	Destinations	Notes
Akron	0.00	0.00	1	I-76 west / US 224 west to I-77 – Akron, Cleveland, Barberton	Western terminus; I-76 exit 18; exit 1 is for 76 eastbound; western end of US 224 concurrency
Akron	1.34	2.16	2	SR 93 (Manchester Road) / Waterloo Road	
Akron	2.47	3.98	3	South Main Street	
Coventry Township	3.74	6.02	4	I-77 / US 224 east – Canton, Akron, Cleveland, Mogadore	Eastern terminus; I-77 exits 122A-B; signed as exits 4A (south) & 4B (north); eastern end of US 224 concurrency
1.000 mi = 1.609 km; 1.000 km = 0.621 mi: Concurrency terminus
