= Ohio State Route 635 =

State highway in northwestern Ohio, US

State Route 635

Route information
- Maintained by ODOT
- Length: 15.18 mi (24.43 km)
- Existed: 1937–present

Major junctions
- South end: SR 18 in Bascom
- North end: US 6 near Helena

Location
- Country: United States
- State: Ohio
- Counties: Seneca, Sandusky

Highway system
- Ohio State Highway System; Interstate; US; State; Scenic
← SR 634	→ SR 636

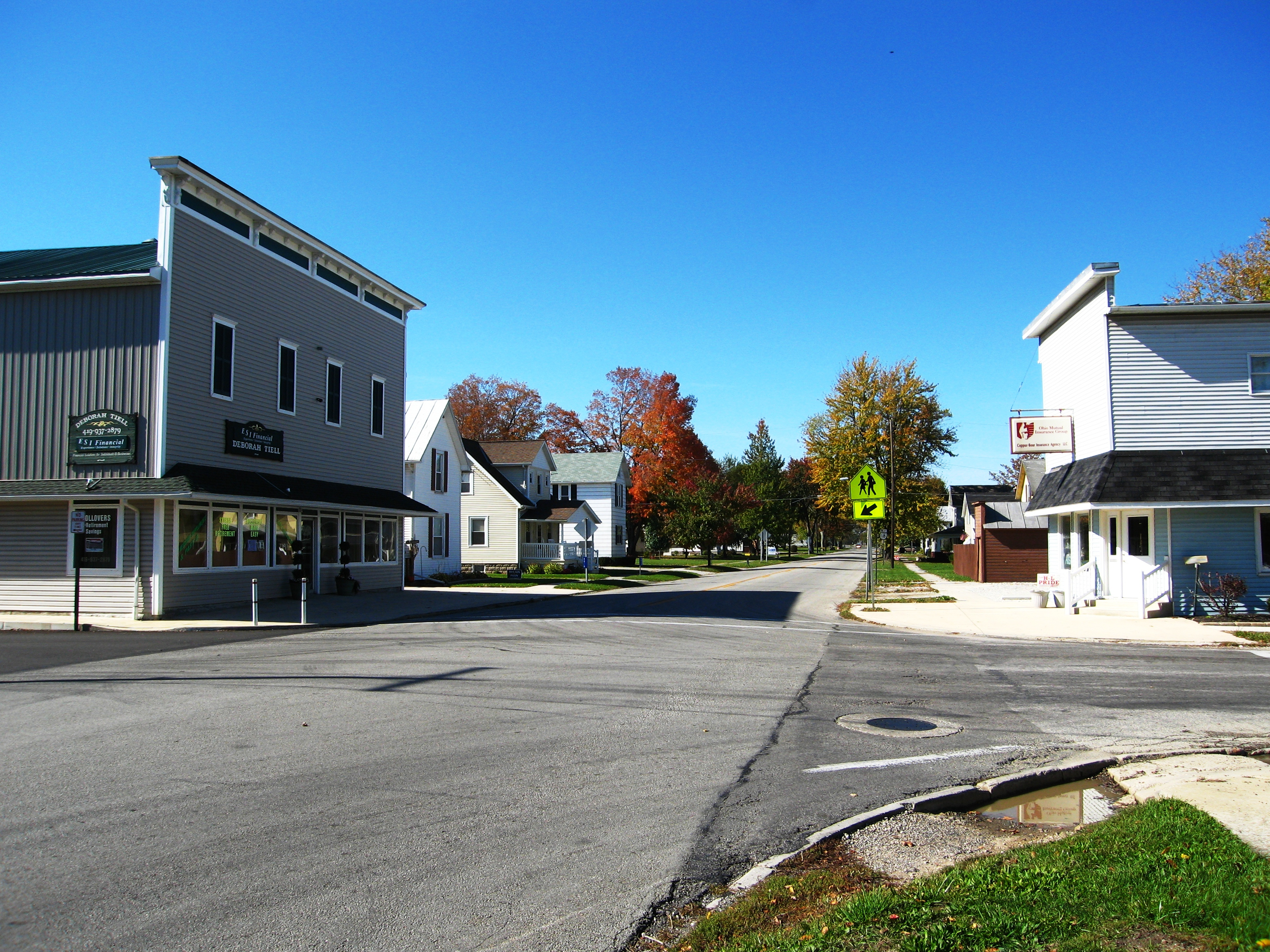
The southern terminus of Ohio State Route 635 at its intersection with Ohio State Route 18 in the community of Bascom.

State Route 635 (SR 635) is a north–south state highway in the northwestern portion of the U.S. state of Ohio. The southern terminus of SR 635 is at SR 18 in Bascom. Its northern terminus is approximately 1 mile (1.6 km) east of Helena at a T-intersection with US 6.

== Route description ==
SR 635 travels through northwestern Seneca County and southwestern Sandusky County along its way. The highway is not included as a part of the National Highway System, a network of highways deemed to be most important for the nation's economy, mobility and defense.

== History ==
The designation of SR 635 took place in 1937. Its original routing between SR 18 in Bascom and US 6 near Helena is the same one that it utilizes to this day. No significant changes have taken place to the alignment of SR 635 since it was established.

== Major intersections ==
County	Location	mi	km	Destinations	Notes
Seneca	Bascom	0.00	0.00	SR 18 (Tiffin Street) / Beech Street	
Seneca	Liberty Township	6.08	9.78	SR 12 west (Fostoria-Fremont Road) – Fostoria	Southern end of SR 12 concurrency
Seneca	Liberty Township	6.33	10.19	SR 12 east (Fostoria-Fremont Road) – Bettsville	Northern end of SR 12 concurrency
Sandusky	Jackson Township	15.18	24.43	US 6	
1.000 mi = 1.609 km; 1.000 km = 0.621 mi: Concurrency terminus
