= Perry Township, Putnam County, Ohio =

Township in Ohio, US

- Township
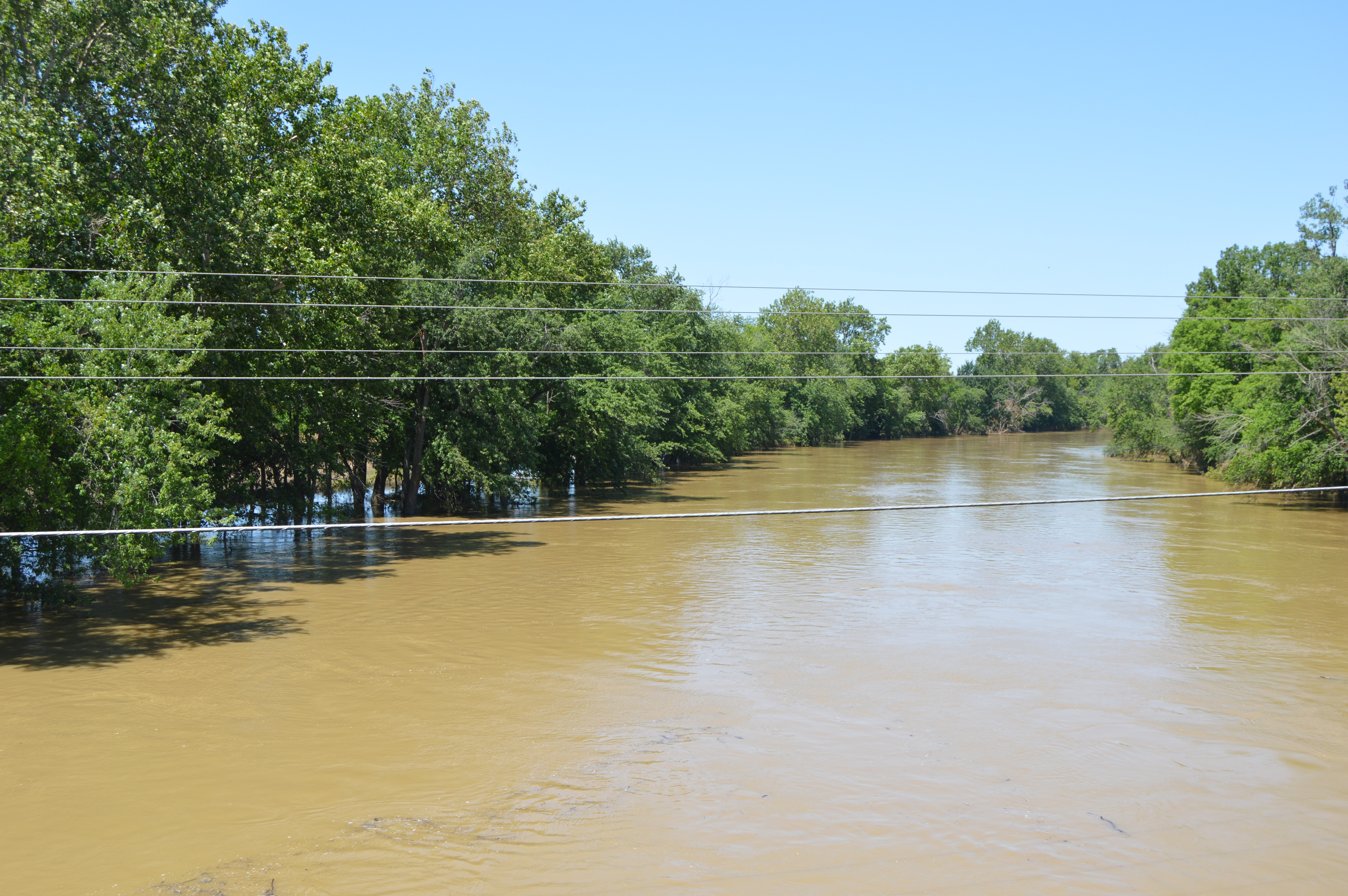
- The Auglaize River south of Dupont, flooded by heavy rains

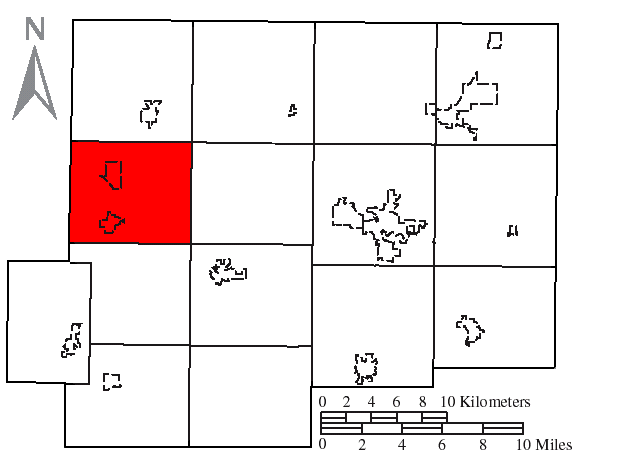
- Location of Perry Township in Putnam County
- Coordinates: 41°2′25″N 84°18′3″W
- Country: United States
- State: Ohio
- County: Putnam

Area
  - Total: 30.2 sq mi (78.2 km^{2})
  - Land: 30.0 sq mi (77.7 km^{2})
  - Water: 0.15 sq mi (0.4 km^{2})
- Elevation: 690 ft (210 m)

Population (2020)
  - Total: 1,011
  - Density: 34/sq mi (13/km^{2})
- Time zone: UTC-5 (Eastern (EST))
  - Summer (DST): UTC-4 (EDT)
- FIPS code: 39-62036
- GNIS feature ID: 1086866

Perry Township is one of the fifteen townships of Putnam County, Ohio, United States. The 2020 census found 1,011 people in the township.

== Geography ==
Located in the western part of the county, it borders the following townships:

- Monroe Township – north
- Palmer Township – northeast corner
- Greensburg Township – east
- Union Township – southeast corner
- Jackson Township – south
- Washington Township, Paulding County – west
- Brown Township, Paulding County – northwest

Two villages are located in Perry Township: Dupont in the northern part of the township, and Cloverdale in the southern part of the township.

== Name and history ==
Perry Township was established in 1828. This township was named for Oliver Hazard Perry, a military leader of the War of 1812. It is one of twenty-six Perry Townships statewide.

== Government ==
The township is governed by a three-member board of trustees, who are elected in November of odd-numbered years to a four-year term beginning on the following January 1. Two are elected in the year after the presidential election and one is elected in the year before it. There is also an elected township fiscal officer, who serves a four-year term beginning on April 1 of the year after the election, which is held in November of the year before the presidential election. Vacancies in the fiscal officership or on the board of trustees are filled by the remaining trustees.
