= Cloverdale, Ohio =

- Village
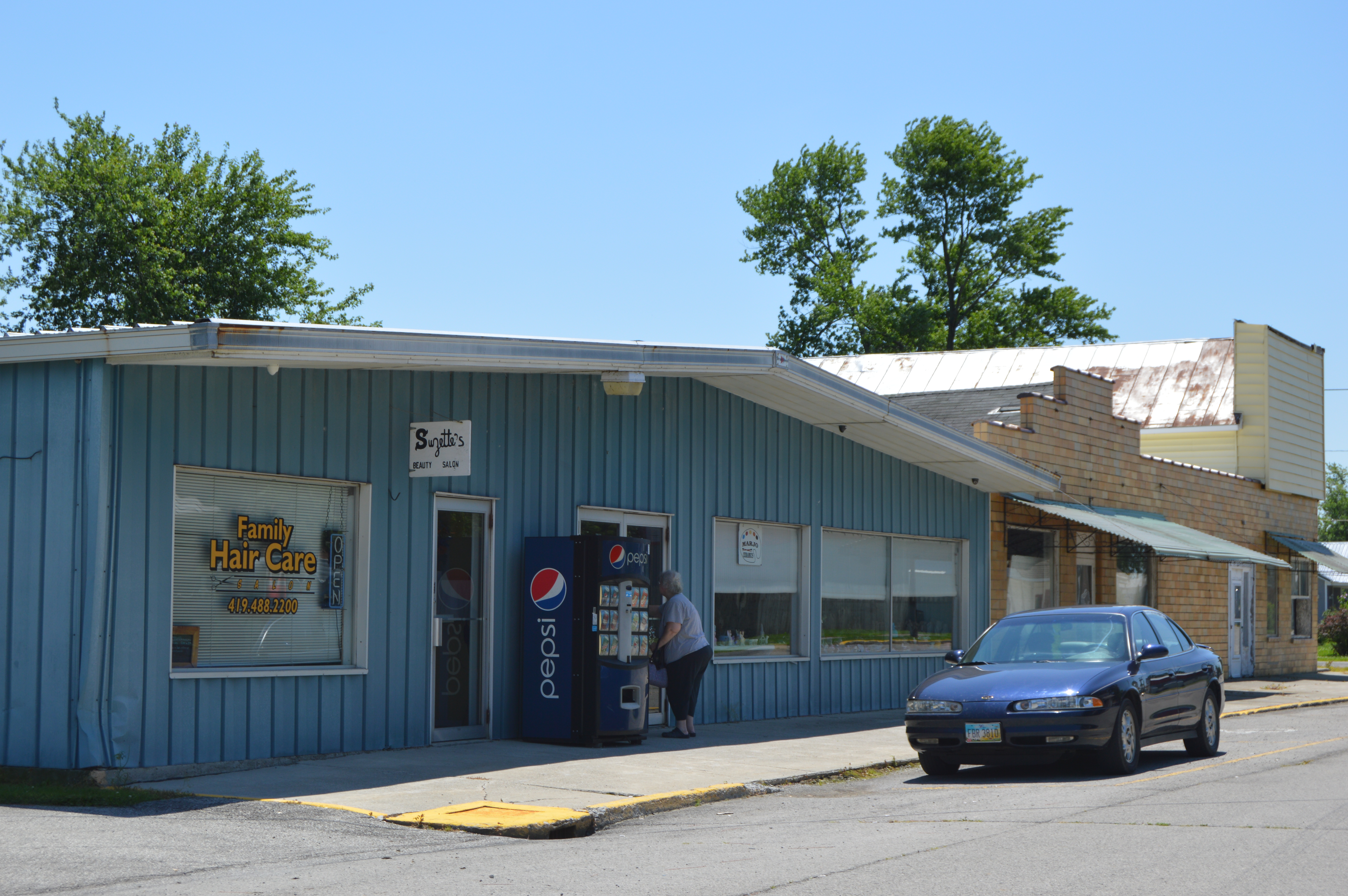
- Commercial buildings on Mahoning Street

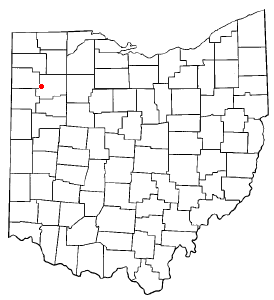
- Location of Cloverdale, Ohio

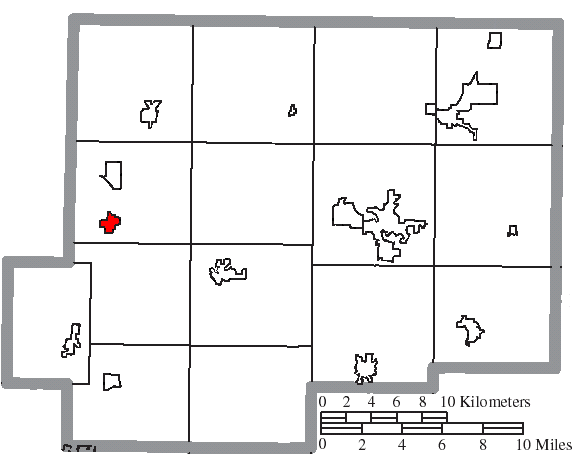
- Location of Cloverdale in Putnam County
- Coordinates: 41°01′09″N 84°18′12″W
- Country: United States
- State: Ohio
- County: Putnam

Area
  - Total: 0.62 sq mi (1.61 km^{2})
  - Land: 0.62 sq mi (1.60 km^{2})
  - Water: 0.0077 sq mi (0.02 km^{2})
- Elevation: 722 ft (220 m)

Population (2020)
  - Total: 170
  - Estimate (2023): 167
  - Density: 275.9/sq mi (106.54/km^{2})
- Time zone: UTC-5 (Eastern (EST))
  - Summer (DST): UTC-4 (EDT)
- ZIP code: 45827
- Area code: 419
- FIPS code: 39-16266
- GNIS feature ID: 2398584

Cloverdale is a village in Perry Township, Putnam County, Ohio, United States. The population was 170 at the 2020 census.

== History ==
Cloverdale was originally called Evansville, and under the latter name was platted in 1877 when the railroad was extended to that point. The present name most likely is derived from the Clover Leaf Railroad, which passed through a nearby junction. The village was incorporated as Cloverdale in 1902.

During the tornado outbreak of November 17th, 2013, an EF-2 tornado struck the southern end of Cloverdale before dissipating, where minor to moderate structural damage occurred, and many trees and power lines were downed. A church in town sustained extensive damage to its walls and roof, and a nearby home sustained collapse of a wall.

== Geography ==
According to the United States Census Bureau, the village has a total area of 0.57 square miles (1.48 km^{2}), of which 0.56 square miles (1.45 km^{2}) is land and 0.01 square miles (0.03 km^{2}) is water.

== Demographics ==
Historical population
Census	Pop.	Note	%±
1910	222		—
1920	180		−18.9%
1930	227		26.1%
1940	185		−18.5%
1950	200		8.1%
1960	237		18.5%
1970	253		6.8%
1980	304		20.2%
1990	270		−11.2%
2000	201		−25.6%
2010	168		−16.4%
2020	170		1.2%
2023 (est.)	167	▼	−1.8%
U.S. Decennial Census

=== 2010 census ===
As of the census of 2010, there were 168 people, 69 households, and 43 families living in the village. The population density was 300.0 inhabitants per square mile (115.8/km^{2}). There were 77 housing units at an average density of 137.5 per square mile (53.1/km^{2}). The racial makeup of the village was 95.8% White, 0.6% African American, 0.6% from other races, and 3.0% from two or more races. Hispanic or Latino of any race were 3.0% of the population.

There were 69 households, of which 33.3% had children under the age of 18 living with them, 43.5% were married couples living together, 8.7% had a female householder with no husband present, 10.1% had a male householder with no wife present, and 37.7% were non-families. 37.7% of all households were made up of individuals, and 8.6% had someone living alone who was 65 years of age or older. The average household size was 2.43 and the average family size was 3.16.

The median age in the village was 35.3 years. 29.8% of residents were under the age of 18; 7.7% were between the ages of 18 and 24; 24.4% were from 25 to 44; 29.7% were from 45 to 64; and 8.3% were 65 years of age or older. The gender makeup of the village was 49.4% male and 50.6% female.

=== 2000 census ===
As of the census of 2000, there were 201 people, 65 households, and 41 families living in the village. The population density was 334.9 inhabitants per square mile (129.3/km^{2}). There were 72 housing units at an average density of 120.0 per square mile (46.3/km^{2}). The racial makeup of the village was 99.00% White, 0.50% Native American, and 0.50% from two or more races. Hispanic or Latino of any race were 1.00% of the population.

There were 65 households, out of which 35.4% had children under the age of 18 living with them, 47.7% were married couples living together, 7.7% had a female householder with no husband present, and 36.9% were non-families. 33.8% of all households were made up of individuals, and 13.8% had someone living alone who was 65 years of age or older. The average household size was 2.46 and the average family size was 3.20.

In the village, the population was spread out, with 23.4% under the age of 18, 6.0% from 18 to 24, 20.9% from 25 to 44, 16.9% from 45 to 64, and 32.8% who were 65 years of age or older. The median age was 45 years. For every 100 females there were 91.4 males. For every 100 females age 18 and over, there were 90.1 males.

The median income for a household in the village was $36,250, and the median income for a family was $38,438. Males had a median income of $33,125 versus $15,625 for females. The per capita income for the village was $19,333. About 15.2% of families and 19.9% of the population were below the poverty line, including 28.2% of those under the age of eighteen and 52.4% of those 65 or over.
