= Sugar Creek Township, Putnam County, Ohio =

Township in Ohio, US

- Township
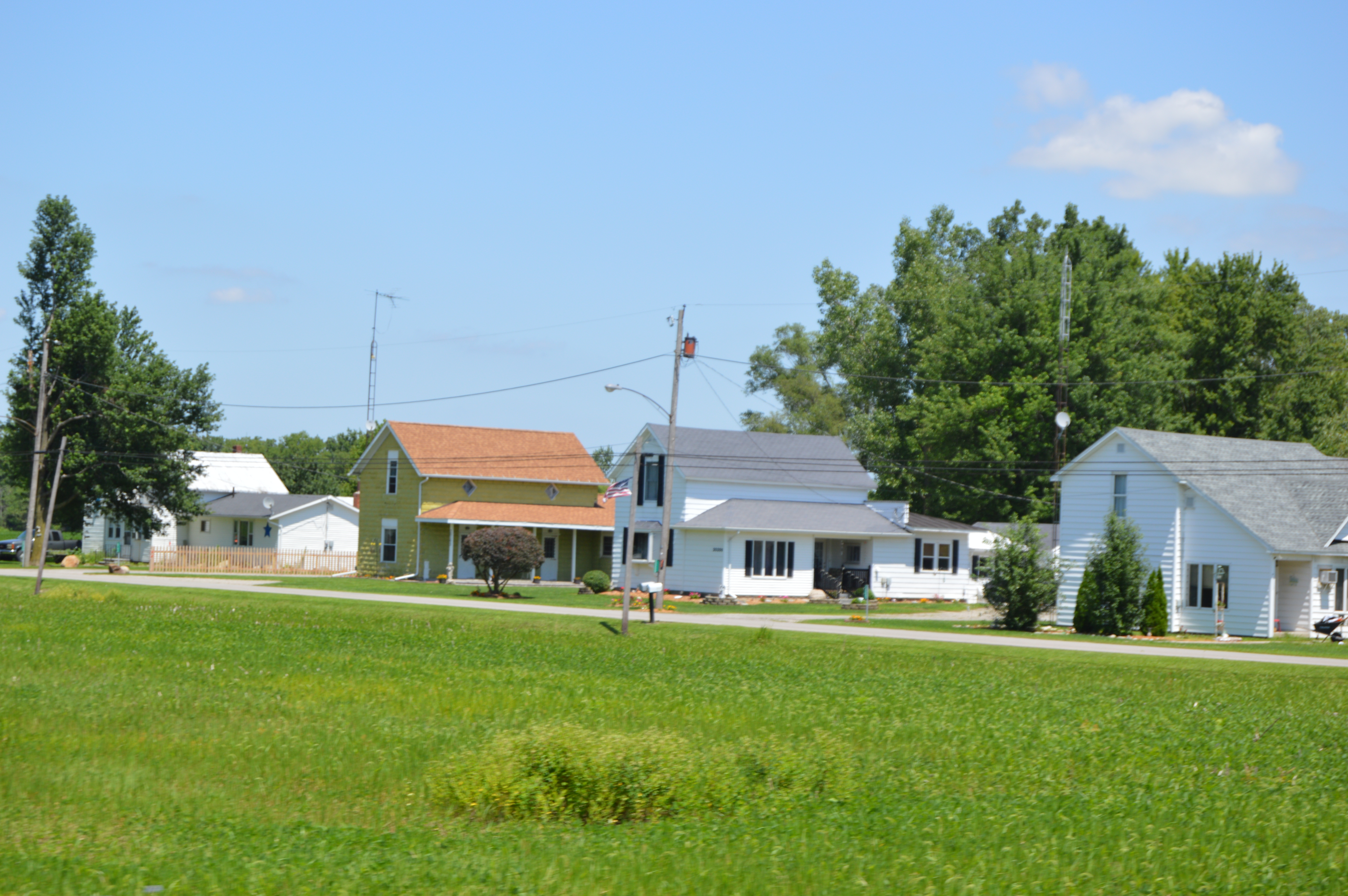
- Houses at Rimer

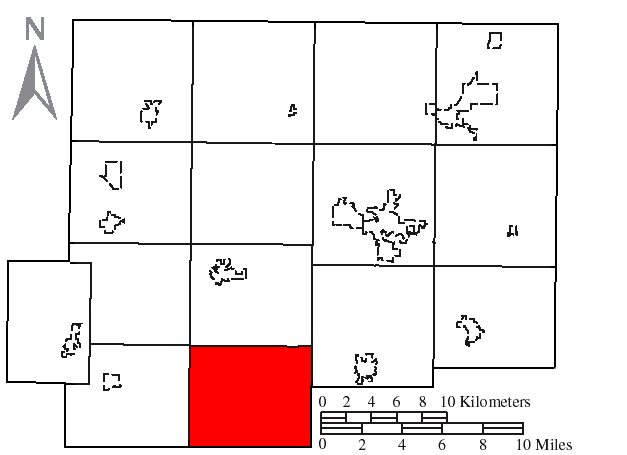
- Location of Sugar Creek Township in Putnam County
- Coordinates: 40°53′39″N 84°10′49″W
- Country: United States
- State: Ohio
- County: Putnam

Area
  - Total: 30.5 sq mi (79.1 km^{2})
  - Land: 30.5 sq mi (79.0 km^{2})
  - Water: 0.039 sq mi (0.1 km^{2})
- Elevation: 751 ft (229 m)

Population (2020)
  - Total: 1,181
  - Density: 39/sq mi (14.9/km^{2})
- Time zone: UTC-5 (Eastern (EST))
  - Summer (DST): UTC-4 (EDT)
- FIPS code: 39-75206
- GNIS feature ID: 1086869

Sugar Creek Township is one of the fifteen townships of Putnam County, Ohio, United States. The 2020 census found 1,181 people in the township.

== Geography ==
Located in the southern part of the county, it borders the following townships:

- Union Township - north
- Pleasant Township - northeast
- Monroe Township, Allen County - southeast
- Sugar Creek Township, Allen County - south
- Marion Township, Allen County - southwest corner
- Jennings Township - west
- Jackson Township - northwest corner

No municipalities are located in Sugar Creek Township, although the unincorporated communities of Rimer and Vaughnsville lie in the township: Rimer in the west, and Vaughnsville in the south.

== Name and history ==
Sugar Creek Township was organized in the 1830s, and named after the Sugar Creek which flows through it. Statewide, four other Sugar Creek Townships are located in Allen, Stark, Tuscarawas, and Wayne counties, plus a Sugarcreek Township in Greene County.

== Government ==
The township is governed by a three-member board of trustees, who are elected in November of odd-numbered years to a four-year term beginning on the following January 1. Two are elected in the year after the presidential election and one is elected in the year before it. There is also an elected township fiscal officer, who serves a four-year term beginning on April 1 of the year after the election, which is held in November of the year before the presidential election. Vacancies in the fiscal officership or on the board of trustees are filled by the remaining trustees.
