= List of high schools in Ohio =

This is a list of high schools in the state of Ohio.

== Adams County ==
- Adams County Christian School, West Union
- Manchester High School, Manchester
- North Adams High School, Seaman
- Ohio Valley Career and Technical Center, West Union
- Peebles High School, Peebles
- West Union High School, West Union

== Allen County ==
- Allen East High School, Lafayette
- Bath High School, Lima
- Bible Believers Christian School, Lima
- Bluffton High School, Bluffton
- Elida High School, Elida
- Jefferson High School, Delphos
- Lima Central Catholic High School, Lima
- Lima Christian Academy, Lima
- Lima Senior High School, Lima
- Perry High School, Lima
- St. John's High School, Delphos
- Shawnee High School, Lima
- Spencerville High School, Spencerville
- Temple Christian School, Lima
- West Central Learning Academy, Lima

== Ashland County ==
- Ashland High School, Ashland
- Black River High School, Sullivan
- Hillsdale High School, Jeromesville
- Loudonville High School, Loudonville
- Mapleton High School, Ashland

== Ashtabula County ==
- Conneaut High School, Conneaut
- Edgewood Senior High School, Ashtabula
- Geneva High School, Geneva
- Grand River Academy, Austinburg
- Grand Valley High School, Orwell
- Jefferson Area High School, Jefferson
- Lakeside High School, Ashtabula
- Pymatuning Valley High School, Andover
- Saint John School, Ashtabula

== Athens County ==
- Alexander High School, Albany
- Athens High School, The Plains
- Federal Hocking High School, Stewart
- Nelsonville-York High School, Nelsonville
- Trimble High School, Glouster

== Auglaize County ==
- Memorial High School, St. Marys
- Minster High School, Minster
- New Bremen High School, New Bremen
- New Knoxville High School, New Knoxville
- Wapakoneta High School, Wapakoneta
- Waynesfield-Goshen High School, Waynesfield

== Belmont County ==
- Barnesville High School, Barnesville
- Bellaire High School, Bellaire
- Bridgeport High School, Bridgeport
- East Richland Christian Schools, St. Clairsville
- Martins Ferry High School, Martins Ferry
- Olney Friends School, Barnesville
- St. Clairsville High School, St. Clairsville
- St. John Central High School, Bellaire
- Shadyside High School, Shadyside
- Union Local High School, Belmont

== Brown County ==
- Eastern High School, Sardinia
- Fayetteville-Perry High School, Fayetteville
- Georgetown High School, Georgetown
- Ripley-Union-Lewis-Huntington High School, Ripley
- Western Brown High School, Mount Orab

== Butler County ==
- Father Stephen T. Badin High School, Hamilton
- Cincinnati Christian Schools, Fairfield
- Edgewood High School, Trenton
- Fairfield High School, Fairfield
- Hamilton High School, Hamilton
- Lakota East High School, Liberty Township
- Lakota West High School, West Chester Township
- LifeSkills Center of Middletown, Middletown
- Madison Junior/Senior High School, Middletown
- Middletown High School, Middletown
- Monroe Senior High School, Monroe
- New Miami High School, Hamilton
- Ross High School, Hamilton
- Talawanda High School, Oxford

== Carroll County ==
- Carroll County Christian Academy, Carrollton
- Carrollton High School, Carrollton
- Conotton Valley High School, Bowerston
- Malvern High School, Malvern

== Champaign County ==
- Graham High School, St. Paris
- Mechanicsburg High School, Mechanicsburg
- Triad High School, North Lewisburg
- Urbana High School, Urbana
- West Liberty-Salem High School, West Liberty

== Clark County ==
- Catholic Central High School, Springfield
- Emmanuel Christian Academy, Springfield
- Greenon High School, Enon
- Kenton Ridge High School, Moorefield Township
- Northeastern High School, South Vienna
- Northwestern High School, German Township
- Shawnee High School, Springfield
- Southeastern Local High School, South Charleston
- Springfield High School, Springfield
- Tecumseh High School, New Carlisle

== Clermont County ==
- Batavia High School, Batavia
- Bethel-Tate High School, Bethel
- Clermont Northeastern High School, Owensville
- Felicity-Franklin High School, Felicity
- Goshen High School, Goshen
- Milford High School, Milford
- New Richmond High School, New Richmond
- West Clermont High School, Union Township
- Williamsburg High School, Williamsburg

== Clinton County ==
- Blanchester High School, Blanchester
- Clinton-Massie High School, Clarksville
- East Clinton High School, Sabina
- Wilmington High School, Wilmington

== Columbiana County ==
- Beaver Local High School, East Liverpool
- Columbiana High School, Columbiana
- Crestview High School, Columbiana
- David Anderson Junior/Senior High School, Lisbon
- East Liverpool High School, East Liverpool
- East Palestine High School, East Palestine
- Heartland Christian School, Columbiana
- Leetonia High School, Leetonia
- Salem High School, Salem
- Southern Local Junior/Senior High School, Salineville
- United High School, Hanoverton
- Wellsville High School, Wellsville

== Coshocton County ==
- Coshocton County Career Center, Coshocton
- Coshocton High School, Coshocton
- Ridgewood High School, West Lafayette
- River View High School, Warsaw

== Crawford County ==
- Buckeye Central High School, New Washington
- Bucyrus High School, Bucyrus
- Colonel Crawford High School, North Robinson
- Crestline High School, Crestline
- Galion High School, Galion
- Wynford High School, Holmes Township

== Cuyahoga County ==
- Bay High School, Bay Village
- Bedford High School, Bedford
- Berea-Midpark High School, Berea
- Brecksville-Broadview Heights High School, Broadview Heights
- Brooklyn High School, Brooklyn
- Chagrin Falls High School, Chagrin Falls
- Charles F. Brush High School, Lyndhurst
- Cuyahoga Heights High School, Cuyahoga Heights
- Euclid High School, Euclid
- Fairview High School, Fairview Park
- Gilmour Academy, Gates Mills
- Independence High School, Independence
- Luther E. Ball High School, Highland Hills
- Maple Heights High School, Maple Heights
- Mayfield High School, Mayfield
- North Olmsted High School, North Olmsted
- North Royalton High School, North Royalton
- Olmsted Falls High School, Olmsted Falls
- Orange High School, Pepper Pike
- Richmond Heights High School, Richmond Heights
- Shaw High School, East Cleveland
- Solon High School, Solon
- Strongsville High School, Strongsville
- University School, Hunting Valley
- Warrensville Heights High School, Warrensville Heights
- Westlake High School, Westlake

=== Beachwood ===
- Beachwood High School
- Fuchs Mizrachi School
- Beatrice Stone Yavne High School
- Yeshiva High School

=== Cleveland ===
==== Public ====
- John Adams College and Career Academy
- Jane Addams Business Careers Center
- Cleveland School of the Arts
- Collinwood High School
- East Technical High School
- Eleanor Gerson School
- Ginn Academy
- Glenville High School
- John Hay High School
- Max S. Hayes High School
- Horizon Science Academy (main headquarters)
- John F. Kennedy High School
- Lincoln-West High School
- John Marshall High School
- James Ford Rhodes High School
- Whitney M. Young School

==== Private ====
- Benedictine High School
- Cleveland Central Catholic High School
- St. Ignatius High School
- St. Joseph Academy
- St. Martin de Porres High School
- Villa Angela-St. Joseph High School

=== Cleveland Heights ===
- Beaumont School
- Cleveland Heights High School
- Lutheran High School East
- Mosdos Ohr Hatorah

=== Garfield Heights ===
- Garfield Heights High School
- Trinity High School

=== Lakewood ===
- Lakewood High School
- St. Edward High School

=== Parma ===
- Normandy High School
- Padua Franciscan High School
- Parma Senior High School

=== Parma Heights ===
- Holy Name High School
- Valley Forge High School

=== Rocky River ===
- Lutheran High School West
- Magnificat High School
- Rocky River High School

=== Shaker Heights ===
- Hathaway Brown School
- Laurel School
- Shaker Heights High School

== Darke County ==
- Ansonia High School, Ansonia
- Arcanum High School, Arcanum
- Bradford High School, Bradford
- Franklin Monroe High School, Pitsburg
- Greenville High School, Greenville
- Mississinawa Valley High School, Union City
- Tri-Village High School, New Madison
- Versailles High School, Versailles

== Defiance County ==
- Ayersville High School, Highland Township
- Defiance High School, Defiance
- Fairview High School, Sherwood
- Hicksville High School, Hicksville
- Tinora High School, Defiance

== Delaware County ==
- Big Walnut High School, Sunbury
- Buckeye Valley High School, Troy Township
- Delaware Christian School, Delaware
- Olentangy High School, Lewis Center
- Olentangy Liberty High School, Powell
- Olentangy Orange High School, Lewis Center
- Olentangy Berlin High School, Delaware
- Rutherford B. Hayes High School, Delaware
- Westerville Central High School, Westerville
- Westerville North High School, Westerville

== Erie County ==
- Edison High School, Milan
- Huron High School, Huron
- Kelleys Island High School, Kelleys Island
- Margaretta High School, Castalia
- Perkins High School, Perkins Township
- St. Mary Central Catholic High School, Sandusky
- Sandusky High School, Sandusky
- Vermilion High School, Vermilion

== Fairfield County ==
- Amanda-Clearcreek High School, Amanda
- Berne Union High School, Sugar Grove
- Bloom-Carroll High School, Carroll
- Fairfield Christian Academy, Lancaster
- Fairfield Union High School, Lancaster
- William V. Fisher Catholic High School, Lancaster
- Lancaster High School, Lancaster
- Liberty Union High School, Baltimore
- Millersport High School, Millersport
- Pickerington High School Central, Pickerington
- Pickerington High School North, Pickerington
- Eastland-Fairfield Career & Technical Schools, Carroll

== Fayette County ==
- Fayette Christian School, Washington Court House
- Miami Trace High School, Washington Court House
- Washington High School, Washington Court House

== Franklin County ==
- Bexley High School, Bexley
- Grandview Heights High School, Grandview Heights
- Hamilton Township High School, Hamilton Township
- New Albany High School, New Albany
- Reynoldsburg High School, Reynoldsburg
- Westland High School, Galloway
- Whitehall-Yearling High School, Whitehall

=== Canal Winchester ===
- Canal Winchester High School
- Harvest Preparatory School

=== Columbus ===
==== Public ====
- Beechcroft High School
- Briggs High School
- Centennial High School
- Columbus Africentric Early College
- Columbus Alternative High School
- Downtown High School
- East High School
- Eastmoor Academy
- Fort Hayes Metropolitan Education Center
- Franklin Heights High School
- Independence High School
- Linden-McKinley High School
- Marion-Franklin High School
- Metro Early College High School
- Mifflin High School
- Northland High School
- Ohio State School for the Blind
- Ohio School for the Deaf
- South High School
- Walnut Ridge High School
- West High School
- Whetstone High School

==== Charter ====
- The Graham School
- Horizon Science Academy
- Mason Run High School
- Patriot Preparatory Academy

==== Private ====
- Bishop Hartley High School
- Bishop Ready High School
- Bishop Watterson High School
- Columbus School for Girls
- Saint Charles Preparatory School
- St. Francis DeSales High School
- Tree of Life Christian Schools

=== Dublin ===
- Dublin Coffman High School
- Dublin Scioto High School
- Dublin Jerome High School

=== Gahanna ===
- Columbus Academy
- Gahanna Christian Academy
- Lincoln High School

=== Grove City ===
- Central Crossing High School
- Grove City Christian School
- Grove City High School
- South-Western Career Academy

=== Groveport ===
- Eastland-Fairfield Career & Technical Schools
- Groveport Madison High School
- Madison Christian School

=== Hilliard ===
- Hilliard Bradley High School
- Hilliard Darby High School
- Hilliard Davidson High School

=== Upper Arlington ===
- Upper Arlington High School
- The Wellington School

=== Westerville ===
- Northside Christian School
- Westerville Central High School
- Westerville North High School
- Westerville South High School

=== Worthington ===
- Linworth Alternative Program
- Thomas Worthington High School
- Worthington Christian High School
- Worthington Kilbourne High School

== Fulton County ==
- Archbold High School, Archbold
- Delta High School, Delta
- Evergreen High School, Metamora
- Fayette High School, Fayette
- Pettisville High School, Pettisville
- Swanton High School, Swanton
- Wauseon High School, Wauseon

== Gallia County ==
- Gallia Academy High School, Gallipolis
- River Valley High School, Bidwell
- South Gallia High School, Crown City

== Geauga County ==
- Berkshire High School, Burton
- Cardinal High School, Middlefield
- Chardon High School, Chardon
- Hawken School, Gates Mills
- Kenston High School, Bainbridge Township
- Notre Dame-Cathedral Latin School, Chardon
- West Geauga High School, Chesterland

== Greene County ==
- Beavercreek High School, Beavercreek
- Bellbrook High School, Bellbrook
- Cedarville High School, Cedarville
- Fairborn High School, Fairborn
- Greeneview High School, Jamestown
- Legacy Christian Academy, Xenia
- Xenia High School, Xenia
- Yellow Springs High School, Yellow Springs

== Guernsey County ==
- Buckeye Trail High School, Lore City
- Cambridge High School, Cambridge
- Meadowbrook High School, Byesville

== Hamilton County ==
- Deer Park Junior/Senior High School, Deer Park
- William Henry Harrison High School, Harrison
- Lockland High School, Lockland
- Loveland High School, Loveland
- Madeira High School, Madeira
- Mariemont High School, Mariemont
- Mount Healthy High School, Mount Healthy
- North College Hill High School, North College Hill
- Norwood High School, Norwood
- Oak Hills High School, Bridgetown
- Princeton High School, Sharonville
- St. Rita School for the Deaf, Evendale
- Taylor High School, Cleves
- Ursuline Academy, Blue Ash
- Winton Woods High School, Forest Park
- Wyoming High School, Wyoming

=== Cincinnati ===
==== Public ====
- Aiken High School
- Anderson High School
- Dater High School
- Gamble Montessori High School
- Hillcrest Training School
- Hughes STEM High School
- Oyler High School
- School for Creative and Performing Arts
- Shroder Paideia High School
- Sycamore High School
- Robert A. Taft Information Technology High School
- Turpin High School
- Walnut Hills High School
- Western Hills High School
- Withrow High School
- Woodward High School

==== Private ====
- Archbishop McNicholas High School
- Archbishop Moeller High School
- Cincinnati Hills Christian Academy
- Clark Montessori High School
- DePaul Cristo Rey High School
- Elder High School
- La Salle High School
- Mercy McAuley High School
- Miami Valley Christian Academy
- Purcell Marian High School
- St. Ursula Academy
- The Schilling School for Gifted Children
- Seton High School
- Seven Hills School
- Summit Country Day School

=== Colerain Township ===
- Colerain High School
- Northwest High School

=== Finneytown ===
- Finneytown Secondary Campus
- St. Xavier High School

=== Indian Hill ===
- Cincinnati Country Day School
- Indian Hill High School

=== Reading ===
- Mount Notre Dame High School
- Reading High School

=== St. Bernard ===
- Roger Bacon High School
- St. Bernard-Elmwood Place High School

== Hancock County ==
- Arcadia High School, Arcadia
- Arlington High School, Arlington
- Cory-Rawson High School, Rawson
- Findlay High School, Findlay
- Heritage Christian School, Findlay
- Liberty-Benton High School, Findlay
- McComb High School, McComb
- Riverdale High School, Mt. Blanchard
- Van Buren High School, Van Buren
- Vanlue High School, Vanlue

== Hardin County ==
- Ada High School, Ada
- Hardin Northern High School, Dola
- Kenton High School, Kenton
- Ridgemont High School, Ridgeway
- Upper Scioto Valley High School, McGuffey

== Harrison County ==
- Harrison Central High School, Cadiz

== Henry County ==
- Holgate High School, Holgate
- Liberty Center High School, Liberty Center
- Napoleon High School, Napoleon
- Patrick Henry High School, Hamler

== Highland County ==
- Fairfield Local High School, Leesburg
- Hillsboro High School, Hillsboro
- Lynchburg-Clay High School, Lynchburg
- McClain High School, Greenfield
- Whiteoak High School, Mowrystown

== Hocking County ==
- Logan High School, Logan

== Holmes County ==
- Hiland High School, Berlin
- West Holmes High School, Millersburg

== Huron County ==
- Monroeville High School, Monroeville
- New London High School, New London
- Norwalk High School, Norwalk
- St. Paul High School, Norwalk
- South Central High School, Greenwich
- Western Reserve High School, Collins
- Willard High School, Willard

== Jackson County ==
- Jackson High School, Jackson
- Oak Hill High School, Oak Hill
- Wellston High School, Wellston

== Jefferson County ==
- Buckeye Local High School, Rayland
- Catholic Central High School, Steubenville
- Edison High School, Richmond
- Indian Creek High School, Wintersville
- Jefferson County Christian School, Wintersville
- Steubenville High School, Steubenville
- Toronto High School, Toronto

== Knox County ==
- Centerburg High School, Centerburg
- Danville High School, Danville
- East Knox High School, Howard
- Fredericktown High School, Fredericktown
- Mount Vernon Academy, Mount Vernon
- Mount Vernon High School, Mount Vernon

== Lake County ==
- Andrews Osborne Academy, Willoughby
- Cornerstone Christian Academy, Willoughby
- Fairport Harding High School, Fairport Harbor
- iSTEM Early College High School, Painesville
- Kirtland High School, Kirtland
- Lake Academy, Willoughby
- Lake Catholic High School, Mentor
- Madison High School, Madison
- Mentor High School, Mentor
- North High School, Eastlake
- Perry High School, Perry
- Riverside High School, Painesville
- South High School, Willoughby
- Telshe High School, Wickliffe
- Thomas W. Harvey High School, Painesville
- Wickliffe High School, Wickliffe

== Lawrence County ==
- Chesapeake High School, Chesapeake
- Collins Career Center, Chesapeake
- Dawson-Bryant High School, Coal Grove
- Fairland High School, Proctorville
- Ironton High School, Ironton
- Rock Hill Senior High School, Pedro
- Saint Joseph Central High School, Ironton
- South Point High School, South Point
- Sugar Creek Christian Academy, Ironton
- Symmes Valley High School, Willow Wood

== Licking County ==
- Career and Technology Education Centers of Licking County, Newark
- Granville High School, Granville
- Heath High School, Heath
- Johnstown-Monroe High School, Johnstown
- Lakewood High School, Hebron
- Licking Heights High School, Patalaska
- Licking Valley High School, Newark
- Newark Catholic High School, Newark
- Newark High School, Newark
- Northridge High School, Johnstown
- Utica High School, Utica
- Watkins Memorial High School, Pataskala

== Logan County ==
- Bellefontaine High School, Bellefontaine
- Benjamin Logan High School, Bellefontaine
- Indian Lake High School, Lewistown
- Ohio Hi-Point Career Center, Bellefontaine
- Riverside High School, De Graff

== Lorain County ==
- Avon High School, Avon
- Avon Lake High School, Avon Lake
- Brookside High School, Sheffield Village
- Clearview High School, Lorain
- Columbia High School, Columbia Station
- Elyria Catholic High School, Elyria
- Elyria High School, Elyria
- Firelands High School, Oberlin
- First Baptist Christian School, Elyria
- Keystone High School, LaGrange
- Lake Ridge Academy, North Ridgeville
- Lorain High School, Lorain
- Marion L. Steele High School, Amherst
- Midview High School, Grafton
- North Ridgeville High School, North Ridgeville
- Oberlin High School, Oberlin
- Open Door Christian School, Elyria
- Wellington High School, Wellington

== Lucas County ==
- Anthony Wayne High School, Whitehouse
- Maumee High School, Maumee
- Monclova Christian Academy, Monclova
- Ottawa Hills High School, Ottawa Hills
- Springfield Local High School, Holland

=== Oregon ===
- Cardinal Stritch Catholic High School
- Clay High School

=== Sylvania ===
- Sylvania Northview High School
- Sylvania Southview High School
- Toledo Islamic Academy

=== Toledo ===
==== Public ====
- Bowsher High School
- Rogers High School
- Scott High School
- Start High School
- Toledo Early College High School
- Toledo School for the Arts
- Toledo Technology Academy
- Waite High School
- Whitmer High School
- Woodward High School

==== Private ====
- Central Catholic High School
- Emmanuel Christian School
- Maumee Valley Country Day School
- Notre Dame Academy
- St. Francis de Sales High School
- St. John's Jesuit High School and Academy
- St. Ursula Academy
- Toledo Christian Schools

== Madison County ==
- Jonathan Alder High School, Plain City
- London High School, London
- Madison-Plains High School, London
- Tolles Technical and Career Center, Plain City
- West Jefferson High School, West Jefferson

== Mahoning County ==
- Austintown Fitch High School, Austintown
- Boardman High School, Boardman
- Campbell Memorial High School, Campbell
- Jackson-Milton High School, North Jackson
- Lowellville High School, Lowellville
- McKinley High School, Sebring
- Poland Seminary High School, Poland
- South Range High School, Beaver Township
- Springfield High School, New Middletown
- Struthers High School, Struthers
- West Branch High School, Beloit
- Western Reserve High School, Berlin Center

=== Canfield ===
- Canfield High School
- Mahoning County Career and Technical Center

=== Youngstown ===
- Cardinal Mooney High School
- Chaney High School
- East High School
- Mahoning County High School
- Ursuline High School
- Valley Christian School

== Marion County ==
- Elgin High School, Marion
- K.U.E.S.T. Academy Christian School, Marion
- Marion Harding High School, Marion
- Pleasant High School, Marion
- Ridgedale High School, Morral
- River Valley High School, Caledonia

== Medina County ==
- Brunswick High School, Brunswick
- Buckeye High School, York Township
- Cloverleaf High School, Lodi
- Highland High School, Granger Township
- Medina Christian Academy, Medina
- Medina High School, Medina
- Medina County Career Center, Medina
- Wadsworth High School, Wadsworth

== Meigs County ==
- Eastern High School, Reedsville
- Meigs High School, Pomeroy
- Southern High School, Racine

== Mercer County ==
- Celina High School, Celina
- Coldwater High School, Coldwater
- Fort Recovery High School, Fort Recovery
- Marion Local High School, Maria Stein
- Parkway High School, Rockford
- St. Henry High School, St. Henry

== Miami County ==
- Bethel High School, Tipp City
- Covington High School, Covington
- Miami East High School, Casstown
- Milton-Union High School, West Milton
- Newton High School, Pleasant Hill
- Piqua High School, Piqua
- Tippecanoe High School, Tipp City
- Troy Christian High School, Tory
- Troy High School, Troy

== Monroe County ==
- Beallsville High School, Beallsville
- Monroe Central High School, Woodsfield
- River High School, Hannibal

== Montgomery County ==
- Brookville High School, Brookville
- Butler High School, Vandalia
- Dixie High School, New Lebanon
- Jefferson High School, Jefferson Township
- Meadowdale High School, Harrison Township
- Miami Valley Career Technology Center, Englewood
- Northmont High School, Clayton
- Oakwood High School, Oakwood
- Stebbins High School, Riverside
- Trotwood-Madison High School, Trotwood
- Valley View High School, Germantown
- Wayne High School, Huber Heights
- West Carrollton High School, West Carrollton

=== Centerville ===
- Centerville High School
- Spring Valley Academy

=== Dayton ===
==== Public ====
- Belmont High School
- Dayton Early College Academy
- Dunbar High School
- Horizon Science Academy
- Northridge High School
- Ponitz Career Technology Center
- Stivers School for the Arts
- Thurgood Marshall High School

==== Private ====
- Archbishop Carroll High School
- Chaminade-Julienne High School
- Dominion Academy of Dayton
- The Miami Valley School
- Temple Christian School

=== Kettering ===
- Archbishop Alter High School
- The Dayton Regional STEM School
- Kettering Fairmont High School

=== Miamisburg ===
- Dayton Christian High School
- Miamisburg High School

== Morgan County ==
- Morgan High School, McConnelsville

== Morrow County ==
- Cardington-Lincoln High School, Cardington
- Highland High School, Sparta
- Mount Gilead High School, Mount Gilead
- Northmor High School, Galion

== Muskingum County ==
- Bishop Rosecrans High School, Zanesville
- John Glenn High School, New Concord
- Maysville High School, Zanesville
- Philo High School, Philo
- Tri-Valley High School, Dresden
- West Muskingum High School, Zanesville
- Zanesville High School, Zanesville

== Noble County ==
- Caldwell High School, Caldwell
- Shenandoah High School, Sarahsville

== Ottawa County ==
- Danbury High School, Lakeside
- Genoa Area High School, Genoa
- Oak Harbor High School, Oak Harbor
- Port Clinton High School, Port Clinton
- Put-in-Bay High School, Put-in-Bay
- Woodmore High School, Elmore

== Paulding County ==
- Antwerp High School, Antwerp
- Paulding High School, Paulding
- Wayne Trace High School, Haviland

== Perry County ==
- Crooksville High School, Crooksville
- Miller High School, Corning
- New Lexington High School, New Lexington
- Sheridan High School, Thornville

== Pickaway County ==
- Circleville High School, Circleville
- Logan Elm High School, Circleville
- New Hope Christian Academy, Circleville
- Ralph C. Starkey High School, Circleville
- Teays Valley High School, Ashville
- Westfall High School, Williamsport

== Pike County ==
- Eastern High School, Beaver
- Pike Christian Academy Waverly
- Piketon High School, Piketon
- Waverly High School, Waverly
- Western High School, Latham

== Portage County ==
- Aurora High School, Aurora
- Bio-Med Science Academy, Rootstown
- Crestwood High School, Mantua
- Field High School, Brimfield
- James A. Garfield High School, Garrettsville
- Ravenna High School, Ravenna
- Theodore Roosevelt High School, Kent
- Rootstown High School, Rootstown
- Southeast High School, Palmyra
- Streetsboro High School, Streetsboro
- Waterloo High School, Atwater
- Windham High School, Windham

== Preble County ==
- Eaton High School, Eaton
- National Trail High School, New Paris
- Preble Shawnee High School, Camden
- Tri-County North High School, Lewisburg
- Twin Valley South High School, West Alexandria

== Putnam County ==
- Columbus Grove High School, Columbus Grove
- Continental High School, Continental
- Fort Jennings High School, Fort Jennings
- Kalida High School, Kalida
- Leipsic High School, Leipsic
- Miller City High School, Miller City
- Ottawa-Glandorf High School, Ottawa
- Ottoville High School, Ottoville
- Pandora-Gilboa High School, Pandora

== Richland County ==
- Clear Fork High School, Bellville
- Crestview High School, Ashland
- Lexington High School, Lexington
- Lucas High School, Lucas
- Madison Comprehensive High School, Mansfield
- Mansfield Christian High School, Mansfield
- Mansfield Senior High School, Mansfield
- Ontario High School, Ontario
- Pioneer Career and Technology Center, Shelby
- Plymouth High School, Plymouth
- St. Peter's High School, Mansfield
- Shelby High School, Shelby
- Temple Christian School, Mansfield

== Ross County ==
- Adena High School, Frankfort
- Chillicothe High School, Chillicothe
- Huntington High School, Huntington Township
- Paint Valley High School, Bainbridge
- Southeastern High School, Chillicothe
- Unioto High School, Chillicothe
- Zane Trace High School, Chillicothe

== Sandusky County ==
- Bellevue High School, Bellevue
- Clyde High School, Clyde
- Fremont Ross High School, Fremont
- Gibsonburg High School, Gibsonburg
- Lakota High School, Kansas
- Saint Joseph Central Catholic High School, Fremont

== Scioto County ==
- Clay High School, Portsmouth
- Glenwood High School, New Boston
- Green High School, Franklin Furnace
- Minford High School, Minford
- Notre Dame High School, Portsmouth
- Portsmouth High School, Portsmouth
- Portsmouth West High School, West Portsmouth
- Sciotoville Community School, Sciotoville
- South Webster High School, South Webster
- Valley High School, Lucasville
- Wheelersburg High School, Wheelersburg

== Seneca County ==
- Bridges Community Academy, Tiffin
- Calvert High School, Tiffin
- Columbian High School, Tiffin
- Hopewell-Loudon High School, Bascom
- New Riegel High School, New Riegel
- Old Fort High School, Old Fort
- Seneca East High School, Attica

== Shelby County ==
- Anna High School, Anna
- Botkins High School, Botkins
- Fairlawn High School, Sidney
- Fort Loramie High School, Fort Loramie
- Houston High School, Houston
- Jackson Center High School, Jackson Center
- Lehman Catholic High School, Sidney
- Russia High School, Russia
- Sidney High School, Sidney

== Stark County ==
- Alliance High School, Alliance
- Canton South High School, Canton
- Central Catholic High School, Perry Township
- East Canton High School, East Canton
- Fairless High School, Navarre
- GlenOak High School, Plain Township
- Heritage Christian School, Canton
- Hoover High School, North Canton
- Indian River High School, Massillon
- Jackson High School, Jackson Township
- Lake Center Christian School, Lake Township
- Lake Middle/High School, Lake Township
- Louisville High School, Louisville
- Marlington High School, Lexington Township
- Massillon Christian School, Massillon
- McKinley High School, Canton
- Minerva High School, Minerva
- Northwest High School, Lawrence Township
- Perry High School, Perry Township
- St. Thomas Aquinas High School, Louisville
- Timken High School, Canton
- Tuslaw High School, Tuscawaras Township
- Washington High School, Massillon

== Summit County ==
- Barberton High School, Barberton
- Copley High School, Copley
- Coventry High School, Coventry Township
- Green High School, Green
- Manchester High School, New Franklin
- Mogadore High School, Mogadore
- Nordonia High School, Macedonia
- Norton High School, Norton
- Revere High School, Bath Township
- Springfield High School, Lakemore
- Stow–Munroe Falls High School, Stow
- Tallmadge High School, Tallmadge
- Twinsburg High School, Twinsburg

=== Akron ===
- Archbishop Hoban High School
- Buchtel High School
- East Community Learning Center
- Ellet Community Learning Center
- Firestone High School
- Garfield Community Learning Center
- NIHF STEM High School
- North High School
- Our Lady of the Elms High School
- St. Vincent – St. Mary High School

=== Cuyahoga Falls ===
- Cuyahoga Falls High School
- Cuyahoga Valley Christian Academy
- Walsh Jesuit High School
- Woodridge High School

=== Hudson ===
- Hudson High School
- Western Reserve Academy

== Trumbull County ==
- Badger High School, Kinsman
- Bloomfield High School, North Bloomfield
- Bristol High School, Bristolville
- Brookfield High School, Brookfield
- Chalker High School, Southington
- Champion High School, Champion Township
- Girard High School, Girard
- Howland High School, Howland Township
- Hubbard High School, Hubbard
- John F. Kennedy High School, Warren
- LaBrae High School, Leavittsburg
- Lakeview High School, Cortland
- Liberty High School, Liberty Township
- Lordstown High School, Lordstown
- Maplewood High School, Cortland
- Mathews High School, Vienna
- McDonald High School, McDonald
- McKinley High School, Niles
- Mineral Ridge High School, Mineral Ridge
- Newton Falls High School, Newton Falls
- Trumbull Career and Technical Center, Champion Township
- Warren G. Harding High School, Warren

== Tuscarawas County ==
- Claymont High School, Uhrichsville
- Dover High School, Dover
- Garaway High School, Sugarcreek
- Indian Valley High School, Gnadenhutten
- New Philadelphia High School, New Philadelphia
- Newcomerstown High School, Newcomerstown
- Sandy Valley High School, Sandy Township
- Strasburg-Franklin High School, Strasburg
- Tuscarawas Central Catholic High School, New Philadelphia
- Tuscarawas Valley High School, Zoarville

== Union County ==
- Dublin Jerome High School, Dublin (serves mostly Franklin County students)
- Fairbanks High School, Milford Center
- Marysville High School, Marysville
- North Union High School, Richwood

== Van Wert County ==
- Crestview High School, Convoy
- Jefferson High School, Delphos
- Lincolnview High School, Van Wert
- Van Wert High School, Van Wert

== Vinton County ==
- Vinton County High School, McArthur

== Warren County ==
- Bishop Fenwick High School, Franklin
- Carlisle High School, Carlisle
- Cincinnati Hills Christian Academy, Mason
- Franklin High School, Franklin
- Kings High School, Kings Mills
- Lebanon Christian High School, Lebanon
- Lebanon High School, Lebanon
- Little Miami High School, Morrow
- Mason High School, Mason
- Royalmont Academy, Mason
- Springboro High School, Springboro
- Waynesville High School, Waynesville
- William Mason High School, Mason

== Washington County ==
- Belpre High School, Belpre
- Fort Frye High School, Beverly
- Frontier High School, New Matamoras
- Marietta High School, Marietta
- Warren Local High School, Vincent
- Waterford High School, Waterford

== Wayne County ==
- Central Christian High School, Kidron
- Chippewa High School, Doylestown
- Dalton High School, Dalton
- Kingsway Christian School, Orrville
- Northwestern High School, West Salem
- Norwayne High School, Creston
- Orrville High School, Orrville
- Rittman High School, Rittman
- Smithville High School, Smithville
- Triway High School, Wooster Township
- Waynedale High School, Apple Creek
- Wooster High School, Wooster

== Williams County ==
- Bryan High School, Bryan
- Edgerton High School, Edgerton
- Edon High School, Edon
- Hilltop High School, West Unity
- Montpelier High School, Montpelier
- North Central High School, Pioneer
- Stryker High School, Stryker

== Wood County ==
- Bowling Green High School, Bowling Green
- Eastwood High School, Pemberville
- Elmwood High School, Bloomdale
- Fostoria High School, Fostoria
- Lake High School, Millbury
- North Baltimore High School, North Baltimore
- Northwood High School, Northwood
- Otsego High School, Tontogany
- Perrysburg High School, Perrysburg
- Rossford High School, Rossford

== Wyandot County ==
- Carey High School, Carey
- Mohawk High School, Sycamore
- Upper Sandusky High School, Upper Sandusky

== See also ==
- List of school districts in Ohio
