= Ansonia =

Ansonia may refer to:

== Places ==
- Ansonia, Ontario, Canada
- Ansonia, Connecticut, U.S.
  - Ansonia High School (Connecticut)
  - Ansonia station
- Ansonia, Ohio, U.S.
  - Ansonia High School (Ohio)
- Ansonia, Pennsylvania, U.S.

== Other uses ==
- Ansonia (frog), a genus of poisonous toads
- The Ansonia, a luxury residence on the Upper West Side of Manhattan
- Ansonia Clock Company
