= Graham School =

Graham School may refer to:

- Graham School (Columbus, Ohio)
- Graham School (New York City)
- Graham School (Scarborough, England)
- Graham School of Continuing Liberal and Professional Studies, the University of Chicago, in Chicago, Illinois
