= Graham High School =

Graham High School may refer to:

- Graham High School (North Carolina), Graham, North Carolina
- Graham High School (St. Paris, Ohio), a public high school in St. Paris, Ohio
- Graham High School (Texas), a public high school in Graham, Texas
- Graham High School (Bluefield, Virginia), a public high school in Bluefield, Virginia

== See also ==
- The Graham School, a charter school in Columbus, Ohio
