= Hicksville High School =

Hicksville High School may refer to:

- Hicksville High School (New York) in Hicksville, New York
- Hicksville High School (Ohio) in Hicksville, Ohio
