= Ansonia High School =

Ansonia High School may refer to:

- Ansonia High School (Connecticut), Ansonia, Connecticut
- Ansonia High School (Ohio), Ansonia, Ohio
