= School on Magnolia =

Defunct high school in Ohio, United States

Coordinates: 41°30′53″N 81°36′41″W

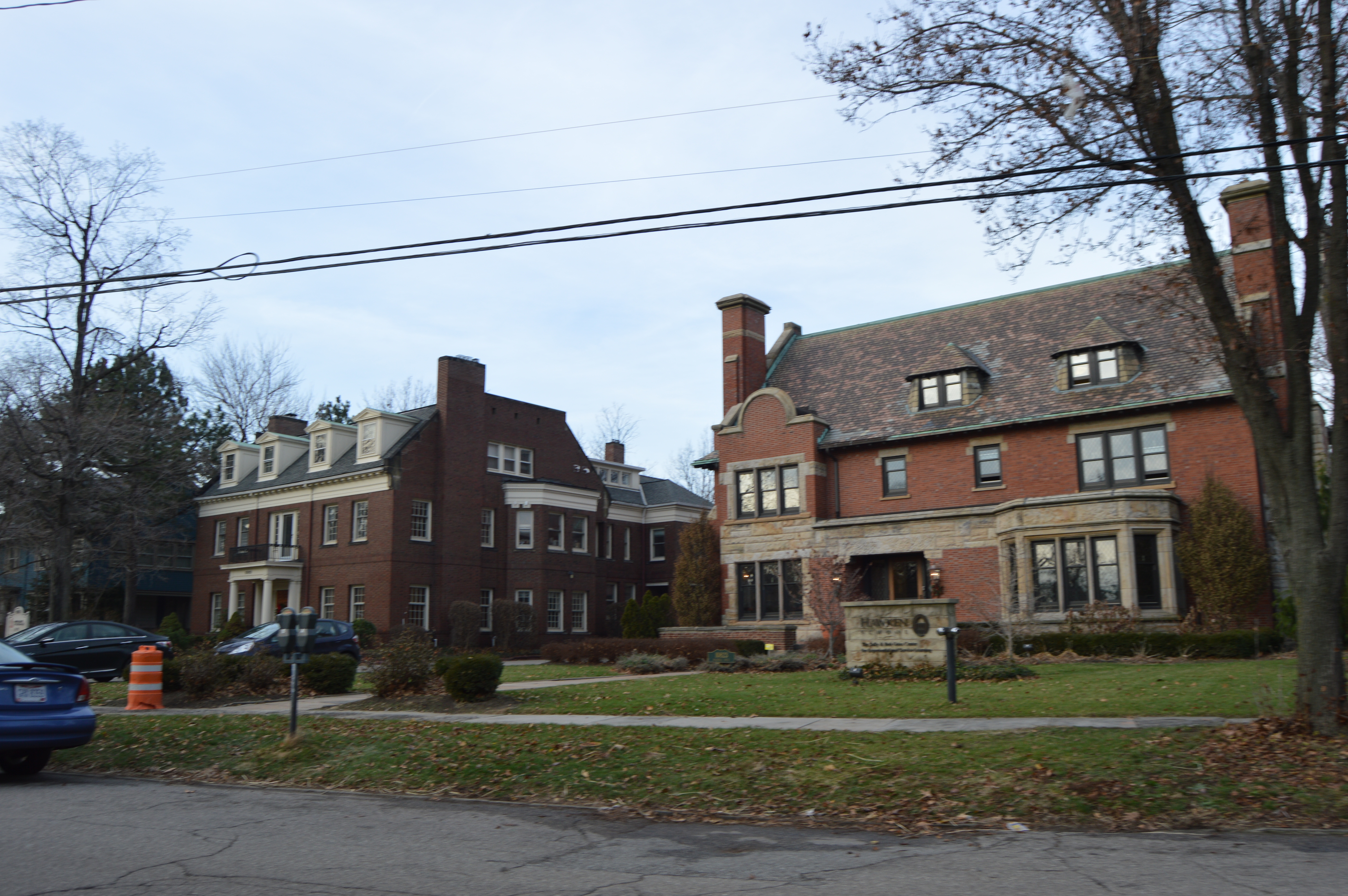
- Campus of the former school.

Information
- Former name: Friends School in Cleveland (1970-1975)
- Religious affiliation: Quakers (until 1975)
- Established: 1970

The School on Magnolia was an alternative high school in Cleveland, Ohio. It was founded in 1970 as the Friends School in Cleveland, and its association with the Religious Society of Friends continued through 1975, at which point the local Friends meeting decided that the school was no longer fully carrying out the mission of a Quaker school. The change was amicable, and the school was renamed The School on Magnolia, after its location in a large old house at 10819 Magnolia Drive in the University Circle section of Cleveland. The school initially served a wide range of students who had found traditional high schools did not meet their needs, but in its later years it increasingly functioned as more of a social service institution for troubled teens. It eventually moved to a new location nearer downtown, and was renamed the Eleanor Gerson School, after a woman who had for many years served on its board of trustees.

Graduates of the School on Magnolia include the film and video director Robert Caruso, ceramic artist MaPo Kinnord, rock music curator Meredith Rutledge, storyboard artist Jay Berkowitz, and Arctic historian and novelist Russell Potter.
