= Brown Township Building =

- U.S. National Register of Historic Places
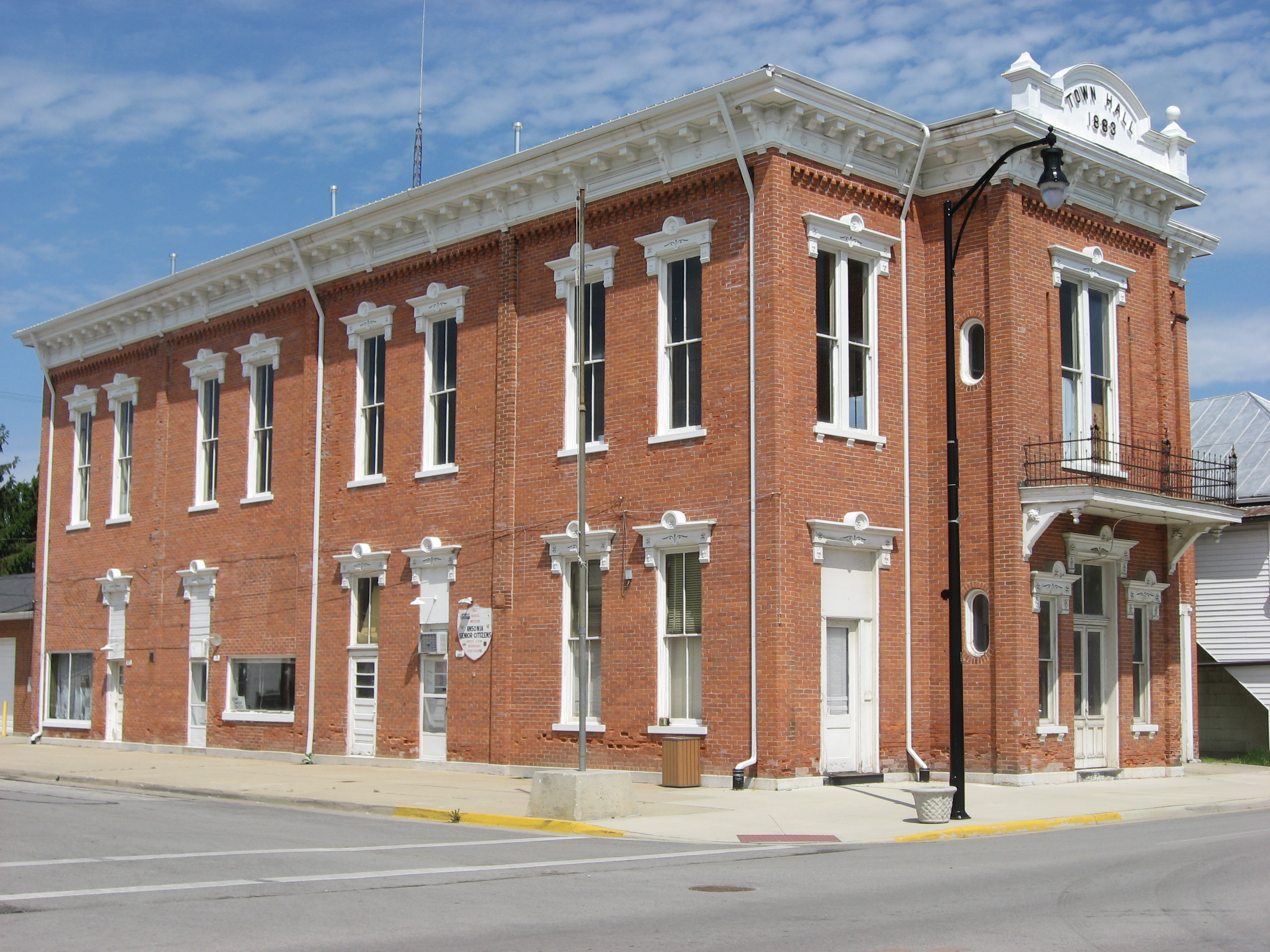
- Front and side of the building

- Location within Ohio Location within the United States
- Location: Main and Weller Sts., Ansonia, Ohio
- Coordinates: 40°12′49″N 84°38′14″W
- Area: less than one acre
- Built: 1883
- Architect: John Fryberger; Spitzer & Co.
- Architectural style: Italianate
- NRHP reference No.: 83001955
- Added to NRHP: August 30, 1983

The Brown Township Building is a historic building in downtown Ansonia, Ohio, United States. Built in the Italianate style in 1883, this two-story structure has historically been the most prominent structure in Ansonia and Brown Township. From the 1880s until the 1950s, the lower floor was used as the village jail, the post office, the fire station, offices for the village and township governments, and a polling place. Although many of these functions have ceased, the governmental offices and polling place remain. Since the building's construction, the upper floor has continuously been a community center for the village and the township, serving as the location for manifold social events through the years.

Designed by John Fryberger of the Toledo-based Spitzer and Company, the Brown Township Building was built under the direction of O.J. Hager. The walls are of brick, and various elements of brick and metalworking are used to decorate the building. Prominent among these ornaments are decorations on the roofline and at the primary entrance and the windows.

The Brown Township Building has been designated a historic site because of its well-preserved historic architecture and its contribution to local history. Although the building was erected in the 1880s, its historic significance was considered to extend into the period after World War II. This fact complicated the process of designating it a historic site; however, the National Park Service deemed the building worthy for inclusion on the National Register of Historic Places in 1983. It is the only Ansonia building that is listed on the Register.
