= Ohio Christian School Athletic Association =

- Abbreviation: OCSAA
- Legal status: Association
- Headquarters: 752 N. Stewart Rd. Mansfield, OH 44905
- Region served: Ohio
- Affiliations: Independent
- Website: ohiocsaa.org
- Remarks: (419) 543-2722/(419) 589-9707

The Ohio Christian School Athletic Association (OCSAA) is a private organization that hosts season-ending tournaments for Ohio's Christian, private, and charter high schools that have joined as members. All members abide by OCSAA rules and regulations and have to follow a curriculum deemed as "'Christian', 'Private', or 'Charter'".

== High school membership structure ==
The OCSAA is broken into four regions for its high school members. Current membership is as follows:

North West Region
School	Location
Calvary Christian	Bellefontaine
Christian Academy Schools	Sidney
Gilead Christian	Mount Gilead
Kingsway Christian	Orrville
Mansfield Christian	Mansfield
Medina Christian	Medina
Monclova Christian	Monclova Township
St. Peter's	Mansfield
Temple Christian - Lima	Lima
Temple Christian - Mansfield	Mansfield

North East Region
School	Location
Christian Community	North Eaton
Coshocton Christian	Coshocton
East Richland Christian	St. Clairsville
Faith Christian Academy	Wilmot
First Baptist Christian	Elyria
HEARTS for Jesus Christ	Fairview Park
Jefferson County Christian	Wintersville
Massillon Christian	Massillon
Mentor Christian	Mentor
Open Door Christian	Elyria

South West Region
School	Location
DePaul Cristo Rey High School	Cincinnati
Dominion Academy	Dayton
Emmanuel Christian - Springfield	Springfield
Germantown Christian School	Germantown
Immaculate Conception Academy	Dayton
Mars Hill Academy	Mason
Milford Christian Academy	Milford
Royalmont Academy	Mason
Temple Christian - Dayton	Dayton

South East Region
School	Location
Adams County Christian	West Union
Chess Christian	Springboro
Cristo Rey - Columbus	Columbus
High Street Christian Academy	Columbus
Liberty Christian Academy	Pataskala
New Hope Christian	Circleville
Ohio Valley Christian	Gallipolis
Ross County Christian Academy	Chillicothe
Wilmington Christian Academy	Wilmington

== Junior high membership structure ==
The OCSAA is broken into two regions for its junior high school members. Current membership is as follows:

=== Northern Region ===
- Arlington Christian
- Ashland Christian
- Celeryville Christian
- Central Christian (Kidron)
- Christian Community
- Crossover Boys Christian Academy
- Cornerstone Christian Academy
- Emmanuel Christian Academy
- Faith Christian Academy
- First Baptist (Elyria)
- Gilead Christian
- Hearts For Jesus
- Heritage Christian (Canton)
- Jefferson County Christian
- Kingsway Christian
- Lake Center Christian
- Mansfield Christian
- Massillon Christian
- Medina Christian
- Mentor Christian
- Monclova
- Open Door Christian School
- Ramah Junior Academy
- ST. Thomas Aquinas
- Summit Christian
- Temple Christian (Mansfield)
- Westside Christian Academy
- Wooster Christian

=== Southern Region ===
- Calvary Christian
- Christian Academy Schools
- Coshocton Christian
- Cristo Rey Columbus
- DePaul Cristo Rey
- Dominion Academy
- East Dayton Christian
- East Richland Christian
- Genoa Christian Academy
- Immaculate Conception Academy
- Lebanon Christian
- Liberty Christian Academy
- Mars Hill Academy
- Miami Valley Christian Academy
- Milford Christian
- New Hope Christian
- Ohio Valley Christian
- Ross County Christian Academy
- Royalmont Academy
- Springfield Christian
- Temple Christian (Dayton)
- Veritas Academy
- Wilmington Christian School

== Tournaments offered ==
The following tournaments are being sponsored by the OCSAA for 2013-14:

=== High school tournaments ===
Fall Sports

- Co-Ed Soccer (11-man)
- Girls Volleyball

Winter Sports

- Boys Basketball
- Girls Basketball

Spring Sports

- Baseball
- Softball
- Track & Field (boys and girls)

=== Junior high tournaments ===
Fall Sports

- Co-Ed Soccer (11-man)
- Girls Volleyball

Winter Sports

- Boys Basketball
- Girls Basketball

== See also ==
- List of high schools in Ohio
- Ohio High School Athletic Association
- Ohio high school athletic conferences
