= Madison Christian School =

School in Groveport, Ohio, United States

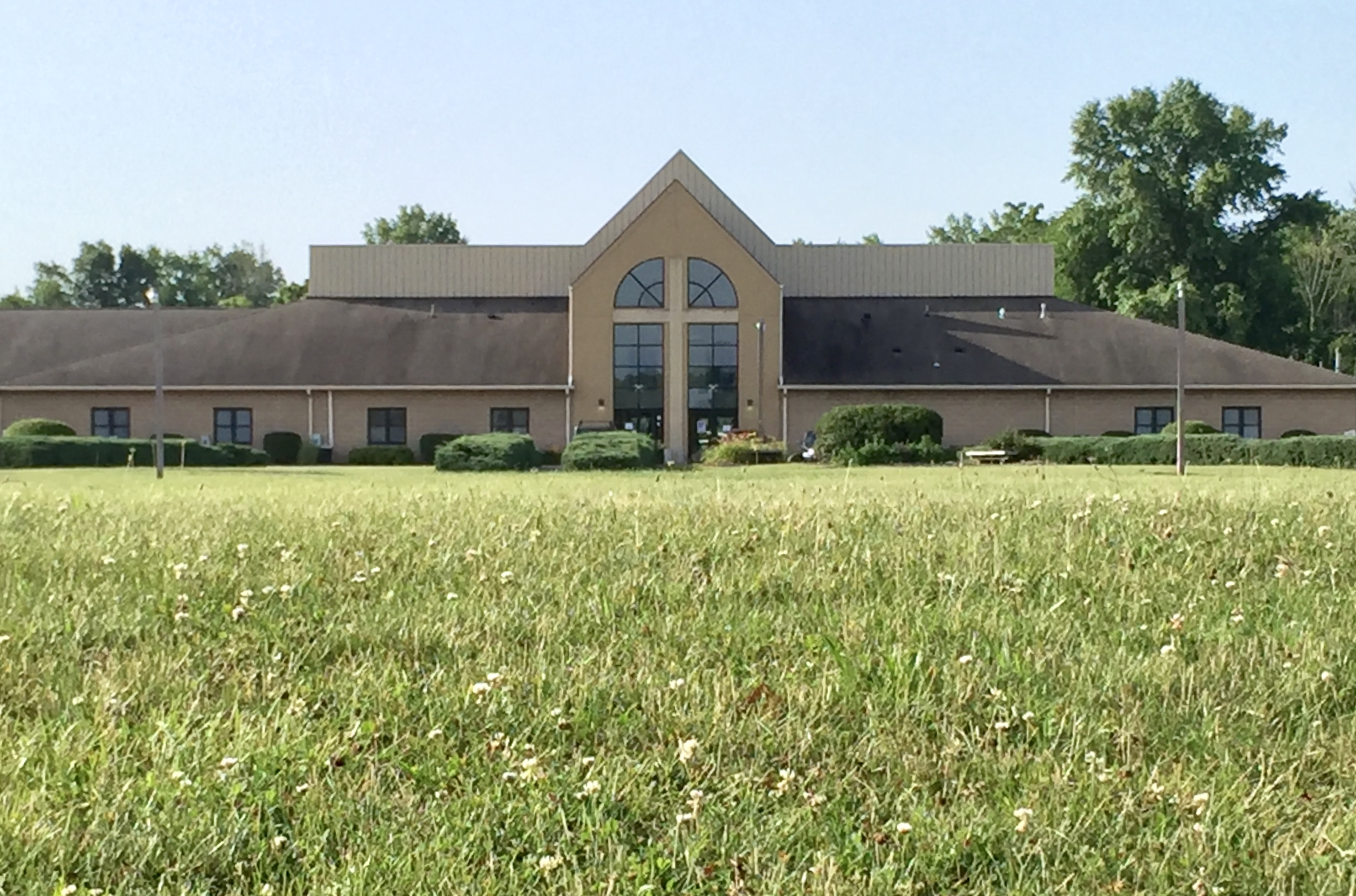
- Junior / Senior High building

Location
- 3565 Bixby Rd; Groveport, Ohio, (Franklin County) 43125; United States; 39°52′04″N 82°54′30″W

Information
- Motto: "Educating for Eternity"
- Religious affiliation: Non-denominational Christian
- Grades: Preschool - 12
- Enrollment: 500+ students
- Athletics conference: Mid-Ohio Christian Athletic League
- Mascot: Eagle
- Website: mcseaglesoh.org

Madison Christian School (MCS) is a private Christian school in Groveport, Ohio. It is accredited by the Association of Christian Schools International and AdvancED. It was founded in 1978 and is a non-profit organization The campus comprises approximately 64 acres near the city of Columbus.

== History ==
- 1977 | A year of prayer and careful planning
- 1978 | Madison Christian School began with 15 preschool students
- 1979 | Kindergarten program added
- 1980 | Grades one through five added
- 1981 | Ohio Department of Education granted a “Letter of Approval”
- 1981 | Sixth grade added
- 1982 | A modular building was added
- 1983 | State Charter extended to include grades seven and eight
- 1983 | “Cued Speech Program” for Hearing Impaired
- 1983 | “Role Modeling Program” for MR Students
- 1989 | Two wings (10,000 square feet) were added to the main building
- 1994 | New modular building added three classrooms
- 1997 | Ground was broken in February for an Activity Center/High School
- 1997 | Tenth grade added: seventh through ninth housed in new facility
- 1998 | Tenth grade charter granted from Ohio Department of Education
- 1999 | Eleventh grade charter granted from Ohio Department of Education
- 2000 | Twelfth grade charter granted from Ohio Department of Education
- 2001 | First graduating class of twelve students
- 2005 | ACSI Boys Basketball State Champs
- 2005 | MCS Athletics joined OHSAA / MOCAL
- 2010 | ACSI Accreditation Process Began
- 2011 | Official candidacy for ACSI accreditation
- 2012 | Formation of Curriculum Departments
- 2014 | Official Accreditation by ACSI and AdvancED
- 2016 | International program begins after obtaining SEVIS certification
- 2016 | Elementary chapel renovation
- 2017 | Gymnasium enhancements / flooring resurfaced
- 2018 | Introduction of the House System in the Jr./Sr. High
- 2018 | Major improvements in Elementary (landscaping) & Jr./Sr. High (modular unit) to commemorate the 40th anniversary
- 2022 | Addition of the Middle School modular building

== Athletics ==
Madison Christian School is a member of the Ohio High School Athletic Association (OHSAA). High school teams participate in the Mid-Ohio Christian Athletic League which includes the following private schools: Delaware Christian School, Granville Christian Academy, Madison Christian School, Northside Christian, Shekinah Christian, and Tree of Life Christian Schools. Junior High teams compete in the Central Ohio Athletic League (COAL). Additionally, MCS participates with various non-league public and private schools in and around the Central Ohio area. They have MCYAL

Madison Christian School participates in baseball, track and field, basketball, soccer, tennis, volleyball, cross country, and softball. Junior high, JV, and varsity levels are available for both male and female students. In 1999, Boys Basketball was coached by future Team USA coach, Kevin Deichert.

== Arts and activities ==
Madison Christian School students take part in the arts through the offerings of drama, band, and choir. MCS's most recent theatrical productions include Cheaper by the Dozen, Meet me in St. Louis. and Father of the Bride.

Extracurricular activities include Chess Club, fall underclassmen events, chapel services, Eagle Leadership Experience, Christmas service projects, a junior/senior Gala, Student Council, class retreats, National Honor Society,, "All-In Night", National Junior Honor Society,
