= Green Meadows Conference =

Athletic league in northwest Ohio

- Classification: OHSAA Division(s) III-IV
- Sports fielded: 9
- No. of teams: 8
- Region: Ohio

Locations
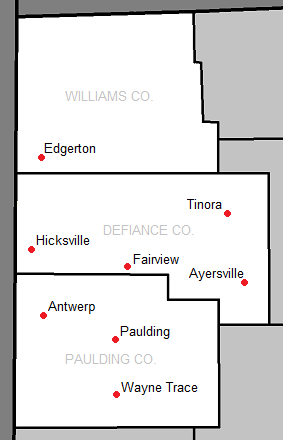

The Green Meadows Conference is an OHSAA athletic league located in northwest Ohio. The eight member schools are all located in one of three counties: Defiance County, Paulding County, or Williams County.

== History ==
The Green Meadows Conference was formed as an athletic conference in 1962. The charter members of the conference were Ayersville, Fairview, Hicksville, Paulding, and Jewell (now Tinora).

In 1966, Blue Creek, from Paulding County and now a part of the Wayne Trace School District, joined the conference. Then in 1967, Oakwood joined.

The conference stayed intact until 1972, when district consolidations in Paulding County caused some changes in the make-up of some member schools. Blue Creek became a part of the new Wayne Trace School District, along with Grover Hill and Payne. Oakwood became a part of the Paulding Exempted School System. Antwerp and Holgate also joined the league making the number of members eight: Antwerp, Ayersville, Hicksville, Holgate, Fairview, Paulding, Tinora, and Wayne Trace.

In 1974, Paulding left the GMC to join the Northwest Conference. They were replaced by Edgerton. Membership remained the same until the 2019-20 school year.

In February 2020, it was announced that Holgate would join the Buckeye Border Conference as a member for every sport except football, which will participate in the Northern 8 Football Conference. Holgate announced in late 2019 that they would move to 8-man football due to low numbers, which caused the remaining schools in the Green Meadows Conference to vote them out of the GMC over scheduling concerns. The Tigers joined the BBC in the fall of 2021.

With Holgate's departure, the GMC decided to extend an invitation to former member Paulding in February 2020, which was accepted shortly afterwards. Paulding, which had been a member of the Northwest Conference ever since leaving the GMC in 1974, rejoined during the 2021-2022 school year.

== Members ==
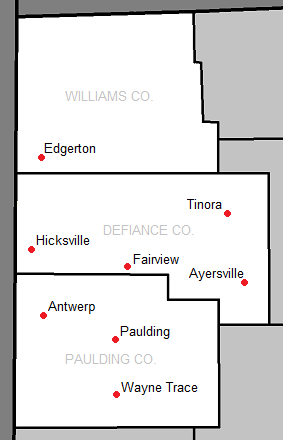
The member schools of the Green Meadows Conference.

School	Nickname	Location	Colors
Antwerp	Archers	Antwerp	Royal Blue, White
Ayersville	Pilots	Highland Twp.	Columbia Blue, Gold
Edgerton	Bulldogs	Edgerton	Maroon, Gold
Fairview	Apaches	Sherwood	Black, Gold
Hicksville	Aces	Hicksville	Red, White
Paulding	Panthers	Paulding	Maroon, White
Tinora	Rams	Defiance	Green, White
Wayne Trace	Raiders	Haviland	Red, Blue

== Former members ==
School	Nickname	Location	Colors	Membership Tenure
Holgate	Tigers	Holgate	Purple, Gold	1972-2021

== Conference rivalries ==
- Tinora vs Fairview
- Ayersville vs Tinora
- Antwerp vs Wayne Trace
- Hicksville vs Edgerton
- Hicksville vs. Fairview
- Hicksville vs. Tinora
- Wayne Trace vs. Tinora
- Antwerp vs. Hicksville
- Paulding vs. Wayne Trace

== State championships ==
=== Fall sports ===
	Boys Cross Country	Girls Cross Country	Football	Golf	Volleyball
Antwerp					1992
Ayersville	1975				
Edgerton					
Fairview					
Hicksville					
Paulding					
Tinora					
Wayne Trace					

=== Winter sports ===
	Boys Basketball	Girls Basketball	Wrestling
Antwerp			
Ayersville	1957, 1961		
Edgerton	1959		
Fairview	1946	1989	
Hicksville			
Paulding			
Tinora			
Wayne Trace	1991		

=== Spring sports ===
	Baseball	Softball	Boys Track & Field	Girls Track & Field
Antwerp		2019		
Ayersville	1997			1996
Edgerton				
Fairview		2021		
Hicksville	1978			
Paulding			1960	
Tinora	2014			
Wayne Trace				

== Notable athletes ==
- Bruce Berenyi, Fairview (Major League Baseball Pitcher)
- Chad Reineke, Ayersville (Major League Baseball Pitcher)
- Denny Stark, Edgerton (Major League Baseball Pitcher)
- Paul Miles, Paulding (National Football League Running Back)

== See also ==
- Ohio High School Athletic Conferences
