= Mid-Ohio Christian Athletic League =

- Conference: OHSAA
- Founded: 1998
- Sports fielded: 8; men's: 4; women's: 4
- Division: Central District
- No. of teams: 6
- Headquarters: Columbus, Ohio
- Region: Columbus, Ohio Metropolitan Area
- Website: http://www.mocalathletics.com/

The Mid-Ohio Christian Athletic League (MOCAL) is a middle and high school athletic league consisting of schools and teams in the Columbus, Ohio metro area. All eight current league members are also members of the Ohio High School Athletic Association (OHSAA).

== Members ==
Members
School	Location
Delaware Christian School	Delaware, Ohio
Granville Christian Academy	Granville, Ohio
Liberty Christian Academy	Pataskala, Ohio
Madison Christian School	Groveport, Ohio
Northside Christian School	Westerville, Ohio
Shekinah Christian School	Plain City, Ohio
Tree of Life Christian Schools	Columbus, Ohio
Genoa Christian Academy	Westerville, Ohio
