= Russell Potter =

American writer and college professor (born 1960)

Russell A. Potter (born 1960) is an American writer and college professor, and guitarist. His work encompasses hip hop culture, popular music, and the history of British exploration of the Arctic in the nineteenth century, as well as the material in the courses he teaches in English literature at Rhode Island College.

His books include Spectacular Vernaculars: Hip-Hop and the Politics of Postmodernism (1995) and Arctic Spectacles: The Frozen North in Visual Culture, 1818-1875 (2007), as well as a novel, Pyg: The Memoirs of a Learned Pig (2011). He teaches at Rhode Island College, where he is editor of the Arctic Book Review. He also worked as a consultant on, and appears in, the Nova documentary Arctic Passage (2006). In 2021, Potter's albums were reissued on vinyl LPs.

== Biography ==
Potter was born in Cleveland, Ohio in 1960. He attended St. John's Lutheran School, Gilmour Academy, and the Friends School in Cleveland (later the School on Magnolia). In 1979, he founded the Black Snake record label, on which he released two albums of his own solo guitar compositions, as well as a 45 rpm single of a bluegrass version of Devo's "Mongoloid" by the Hotfoot Quartet. He later attended Goddard College and the Evergreen State College; he earned his Ph.D. in English Literature from Brown University in 1991. He lives in Providence, Rhode Island.

He is a professor at Rhode Island College in Providence, Rhode Island. He has developed courses in English on several topics, including literature in Victorian England. He has posted material on that era, about an early detective and his representation in Bleak House, a novel by Charles Dickens.

== Books ==
- Spectacular Vernaculars: Hip-hop and the Politics of Postmodernism, SUNY Press 1995 (ISBN 0791426262)
- Arctic Spectacles: The Frozen North in Visual Culture, 1818-1875, University of Washington Press 2007 (ISBN 0295986808)
- Pyg: The Memoirs of a Learned Pig, Canongate Books 2011 (ISBN 0857862405)
- Finding Franklin: The Untold Story of a 165-Year Search, McGiill-Queen's University Press 2016 (ISBN 9780773547841)
