= Ohio Department of Youth Services =

Department of Youth Services
- Abbreviation: DYS

Jurisdictional structure
- Operations jurisdiction: Ohio

Website
- www.dys.ohio.gov

The Ohio Department of Youth Services (DYS) is the administrative department of the Ohio state government responsible for juvenile corrections. It has its headquarters in Columbus.

== Facilities ==
As of 2013 DYS had 525 prisoners in four facilities, with one of them scheduled to close in 2014. Circa 2002 it had 1,949 prisoners in 10 facilities.

Open facilities (all house boys):

- Circleville Juvenile Correctional Facility (Circleville) - General population boys.
- Cuyahoga Hills Juvenile Correctional Facility (Highland Hills) - Boys between 12 and 21 - Houses Luther E. Ball High School.
- Indian River Juvenile Correctional Facility (Massillon) - Boys between 12 and 20. It is located where U.S. Route 30 and Ohio Route 21 intersect.

Former facilities:

- Mohican Juvenile Correctional Facility (Hanover Township, Ashland County, near Perrysville) - Located in the Mohican State Forest, between Cleveland and Columbus. Housed the Louis Bromfield High School
- Maumee Youth Center (Liberty Center) - Closed in 2001.
- Training Institute of Central Ohio (Columbus).
- Buckeye Youth Center (Columbus) - Closed in 1993.
- Ohio River Valley Juvenile Correctional Facility (Franklin Furnace) - facility currently leased to Lawrence County for conversion to a temporary county jail.
- Marion Juvenile Correctional Facility - Closed in 2009.
- Riverview Juvenile Correctional Facility (Delaware County) - Originally founded as the State Reform and Industrial School for Girls in 1869, it went through several name changes before being renamed Riverview. It was located across the road from Scioto Juvenile Correctional Facility. Closed in 2003.
- Scioto Juvenile Correctional Facility (Delaware County) - Formerly served as a male reception center and houses all girls who are in the custody of the DYS - It is located on the Scioto River. The facility, which housed the William K. Willis High School, had 247 employees and 38 inmates, with 18 females and 20 males as of 2013. DYS announced Scioto would close in the spring of 2014; DYS stated that the facility was very old and needed repairs with a cost of $5.6 million. Boys were to be moved to other DYS facilities. All girls were moved to community-based centers, and As of 2015 DYS no longer has a dedicated facility for adjudicated girls.

== See also ==
- Youth services
