= Louis Bromfield High School =

Former school in Perrysville, Ohio, USA

- Mohican Juvenile Correctional Facility

Location
- 1012 ODNR Mohican 51; Perrysville, (Ashland County), Ohio 44864; United States
- Coordinates: 40°36′18″N 82°18′37″W

Information
- Closed: 2010
- School district: Buckeye United Schools
- Authority: Ohio Department of Youth Services
- Superintendent: Maryalice Turner
- Principal: James Lucas
- Grades: 9–12
- Colors: Burgundy and Blue
- Team name: Braves
- Athletic Director: Holly Thomas
- Website: Correctional Facility Website

Louis Bromfield High School was a high school in Perrysville, Ohio, USA. It was a part of the Mohican Juvenile Correctional Facility. All youth prisoners who did not have a high school degree were required to participate in the educational program. The Mohican Juvenile Correctional Facility of the Ohio Department of Youth Services was closed in May 2010.
