= Shelby House (Botkins, Ohio) =

- U.S. National Register of Historic Places
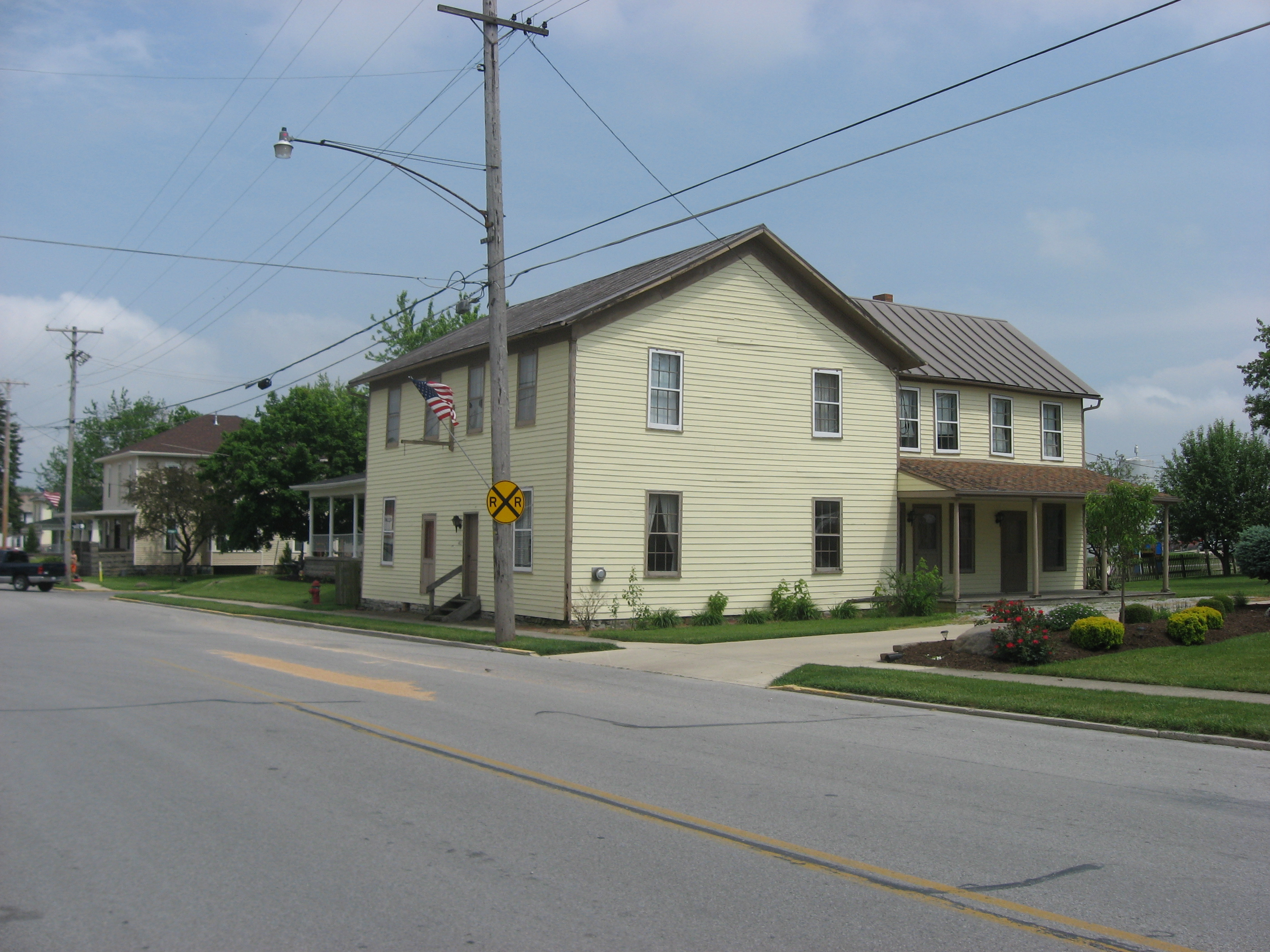
- Front and side of the house

- Location within Ohio Location within the United States
- Location: 403 W. State St., Botkins, Ohio
- Coordinates: 40°28′3″N 84°11′13″W
- Area: less than one acre
- Built: 1864
- NRHP reference No.: 78002188
- Added to NRHP: December 8, 1978

The Shelby House is a historic building in Botkins, Ohio, United States. Built in 1864, it was constructed by local businessman Philip Sheets as a hotel for railroad passengers originating from or destined for northern Shelby County and southern Auglaize County. By the early twentieth century, railroad traffic had declined with the advent of the automobile, and the house was converted into an apartment building. It remained in operation until abandonment in the 1940s; for periods of time, it housed businesses or was used as a storage building, but it never reopened as a hotel or apartment building. Eventually, the house was purchased by the Botkins Historical Society, which converted it into a museum. The Shelby House was added to the National Register of Historic Places in 1978; at this time, it was seen as significant both for its architecture and for its contribution to broad patterns of American history.
