= East Richland Christian Schools =

East Richland Schools

Location
- 67885 Friends Church Road; St. Clairsville, Ohio 43950; United States
- 40°4′17″N 80°57′15″W

Information
- Type: Private, Coeducational high school
- Oversight: East Richland Evangelical Friends Church
- Administrator: April Woods
- Principal: Travis Mckinley (high school)
- Senior pastor: Jerry Wenger
- Grades: Pre-K-12
- Average class size: 13 children per grade level
- Student to teacher ratio: 1:10 (teacher to student)
- Colors: Red, Gold, and White
- Athletics conference: Ohio Christian School Athletic Association
- Sports: Soccer, Basketball, Volleyball, Track, Bowling, Cross Country, Cheering
- Mascot: Lion
- Nickname: ERCS
- Team name: Lions
- Rival: Jefferson County
- Website: www.eastrichland.org

East Richland Christian Schools is a private, coeducational Christian school in St. Clairsville, Ohio, United States. ERCS currently resides on the campus of the East Richland Evangelical Friends Church which provides the school oversight. Athletic teams compete as the East Richland Lions in the Ohio Christian School Athletic Association.

The school has been awarded a Thomas Edison Award for Excellence in STEAM Education.

== Background ==
East Richland Christian Schools was formed by the merger of New Covenant Academy and Faith Community Christian High School in 2009. In 2019, the school finished its new high school building, the Ickes Family Life Center. The school offers many extra-curricular activities including junior high and varsity sports, speech, choir, band, math, science, and drama. A new elementary building was constructed in 2011 to house pre-school through 6th grade. In 2010, a modular classroom was purchased for additional high school classroom space.
