= Indian River High School (Ohio) =

Coordinates: 40°46′01″N 81°31′32″W

- Indian River Juvenile; Correctional Facility
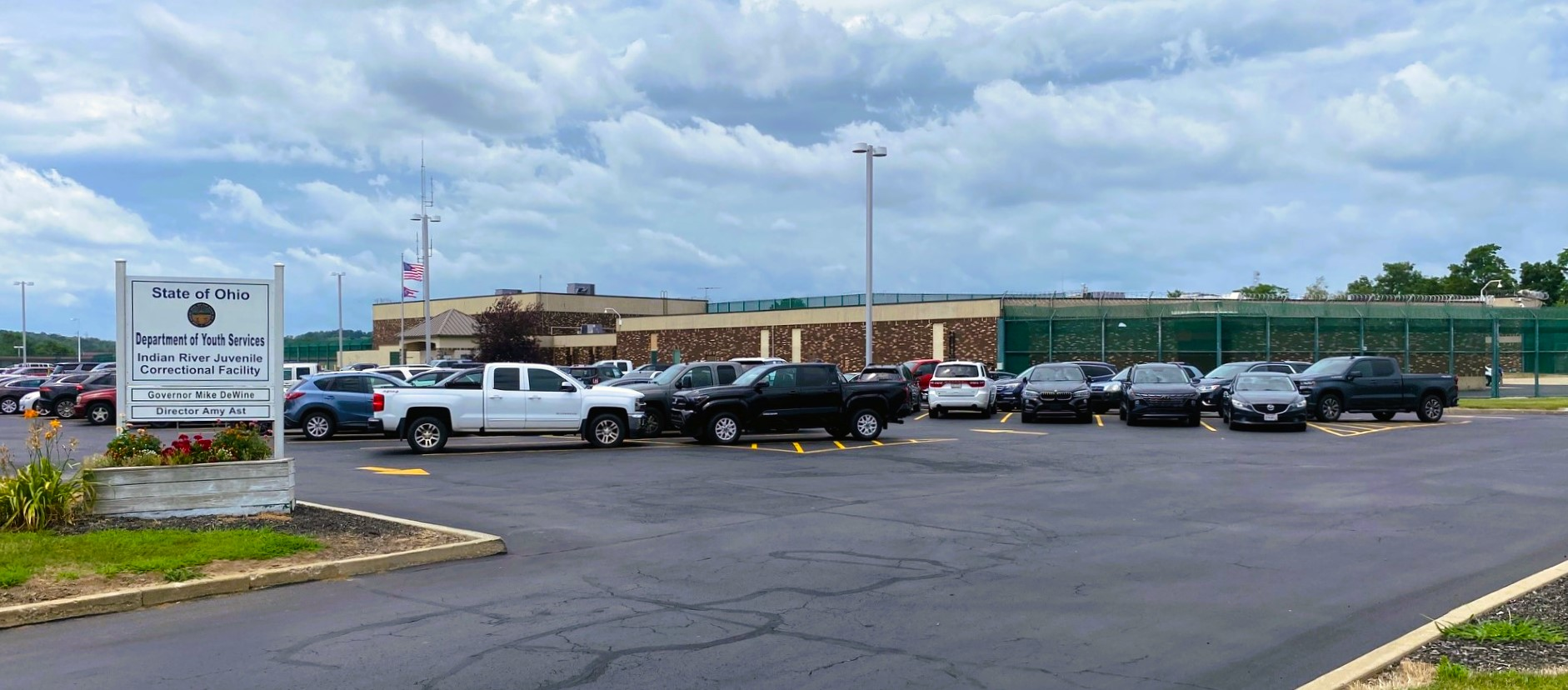

Location
- 2775 Indian River Road SW; Massillon, (Stark County), Ohio 44647; United States

Information
- Type: Juvenile Correctional Facility
- School district: Buckeye United Schools
- Authority: Ohio Department of Youth Services
- Superintendent: Mike Klein
- Principal: Anthony Korzan
- Grades: 9–12
- Website: Correctional Facility Website

Indian River High School is a high school in Massillon, Ohio. It is a part of the Indian River Juvenile Correctional Facility. All youth prisoners who do not have a high school degree are required to participate in the educational program. It takes in young men from the age of 12 to the age of 21. They were awarded an accreditation from the American Correctional Association in 1998.
