= Botkins, Ohio =

- Village
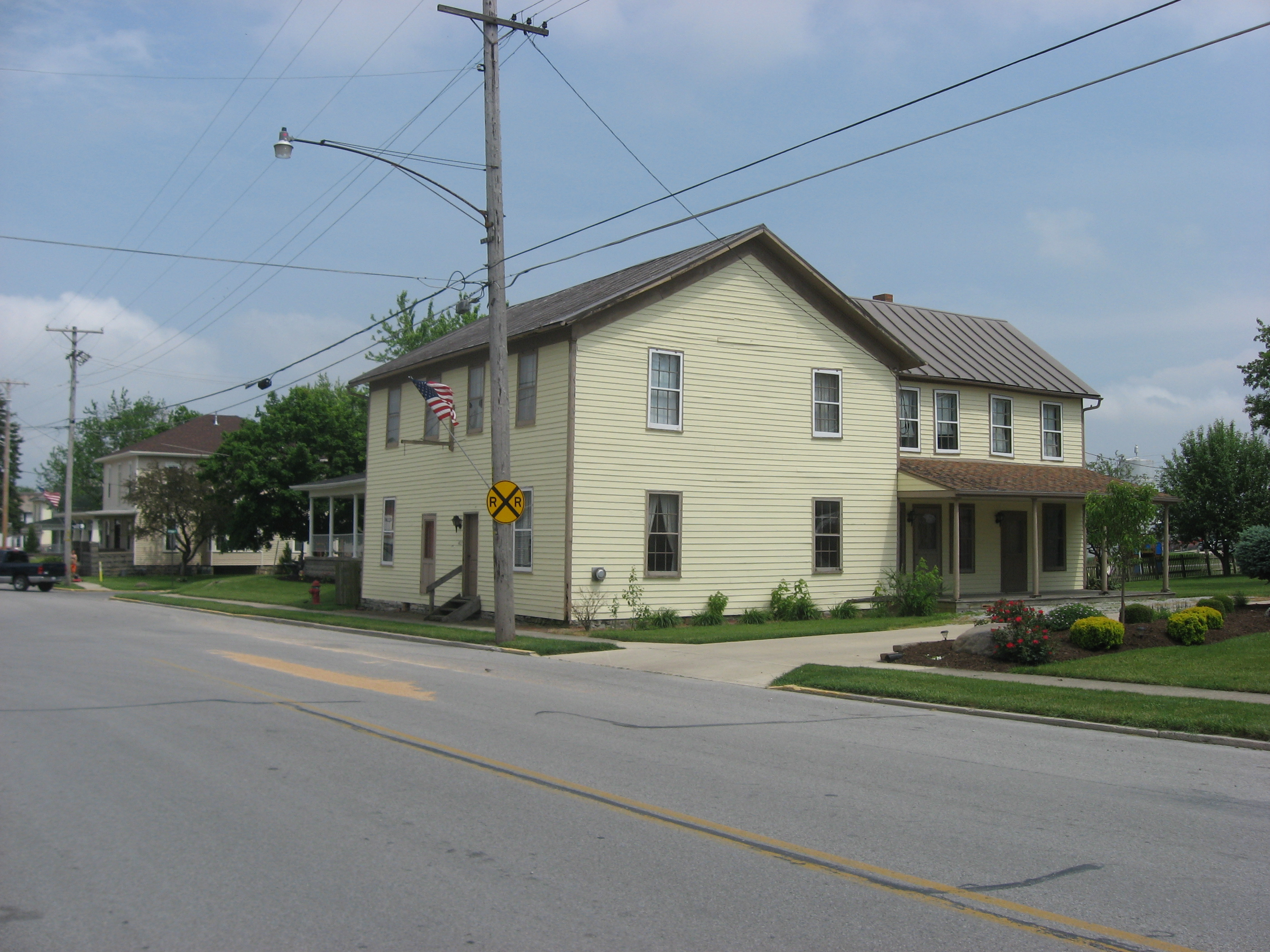
- Streetside view of Shelby House in Botkins

- Seal

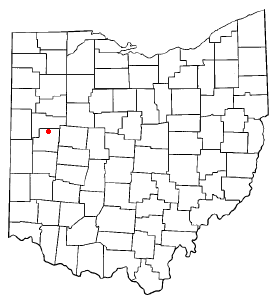
- Location of Botkins, Ohio

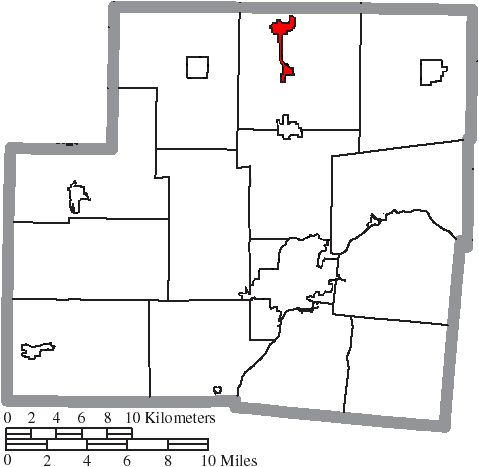
- Location of Botkins in Shelby County
- Coordinates: 40°28′04″N 84°11′09″W
- Country: United States
- State: Ohio
- County: Shelby

Government
  - Mayor: Lance Symonds
  - Village Administrator: Randy Purdy

Area
  - Total: 1.27 sq mi (3.30 km^{2})
  - Land: 1.26 sq mi (3.27 km^{2})
  - Water: 0.012 sq mi (0.03 km^{2})
- Elevation: 1,004 ft (306 m)

Population (2020)
  - Total: 1,155
  - Estimate (2023): 1,176
  - Density: 914.6/sq mi (353.12/km^{2})
- Time zone: UTC-5 (Eastern (EST))
  - Summer (DST): UTC-4 (EDT)
- ZIP code: 45306
- Area codes: 937, 326
- FIPS code: 39-07832
- GNIS feature ID: 2398153
- Website: http://www.botkinsohio.com

Botkins is a village in Shelby County, Ohio, United States. The population was 1,155 at the 2020 census.

Botkins is located alongside Interstate 75 at Exit 104. Botkins is at the northern edge of Shelby County, immediately south of its border with Auglaize County. It also lies at the northern edge of the 937 area code.

== History ==
Botkins was platted in 1858, and named for Richard Botkin, the original owner of the town site. A post office called Botkins has been in operation since 1877. The village was incorporated in 1881.

== Geography ==
According to the United States Census Bureau, the village has a total area of 1.25 square miles (3.24 km^{2}), of which 1.24 square miles (3.21 km^{2}) is land and 0.01 square miles (0.03 km^{2}) is water.

The center of the solar eclipse of April 8, 2024 traveled over the northwest corner of Botkins.

== Demographics ==
Historical population
Census	Pop.	Note	%±
1880	314		—
1900	420		—
1910	579		37.9%
1920	557		−3.8%
1930	488		−12.4%
1940	502		2.9%
1950	608		21.1%
1960	854		40.5%
1970	1,057		23.8%
1980	1,372		29.8%
1990	1,340		−2.3%
2000	1,205		−10.1%
2010	1,155		−4.1%
2020	1,155		0.0%
2023 (est.)	1,176	▲	1.8%
U.S. Decennial Census

=== 2010 census ===
As of the census of 2010, there were 1,155 people, 480 households, and 315 families living in the village. The population density was 931.5 inhabitants per square mile (359.7/km^{2}). There were 507 housing units at an average density of 408.9 per square mile (157.9/km^{2}). The racial makeup of the village was 97.7% White, 0.4% African American, 0.1% Native American, 0.6% Asian, 0.1% Pacific Islander, and 1.0% from two or more races. Hispanic or Latino of any race were 0.7% of the population.

There were 480 households, of which 30.4% had children under the age of 18 living with them, 53.1% were married couples living together, 7.9% had a female householder with no husband present, 4.6% had a male householder with no wife present, and 34.4% were non-families. 30.4% of all households were made up of individuals, and 11.1% had someone living alone who was 65 years of age or older. The average household size was 2.41 and the average family size was 3.00.

The median age in the village was 37.8 years. 25.4% of residents were under the age of 18; 7.6% were between the ages of 18 and 24; 25.6% were from 25 to 44; 28.3% were from 45 to 64; and 13.2% were 65 years of age or older. The gender makeup of the village was 49.6% male and 50.4% female.

=== 2000 census ===
As of the census of 2000, there were 1,205 people, 463 households, and 330 families living in the village. The population density was 1,311.0 inhabitants per square mile (506.2/km^{2}). There were 482 housing units at an average density of 524.4 per square mile (202.5/km^{2}). The racial makeup of the village was 99.25% White, 0.33% African American, 0.17% from other races, and 0.25% from two or more races. Hispanic or Latino of any race were 0.58% of the population.

There were 463 households, out of which 32.8% had children under the age of 18 living with them, 57.9% were married couples living together, 8.9% had a female householder with no husband present, and 28.7% were non-families. 26.6% of all households were made up of individuals, and 11.9% had someone living alone who was 65 years of age or older. The average household size was 2.60 and the average family size was 3.18.

In the village, the population was spread out, with 27.5% under the age of 18, 10.0% from 18 to 24, 28.5% from 25 to 44, 20.3% from 45 to 64, and 13.6% who were 65 years of age or older. The median age was 35 years. For every 100 females there were 101.8 males. For every 100 females age 18 and over, there were 100.9 males.

The median income for a household in the village was $43,000, and the median income for a family was $53,750. Males had a median income of $34,464 versus $23,359 for females. The per capita income for the village was $18,880. About 1.8% of families and 3.6% of the population were below the poverty line, including 7.6% of those under age 18 and 3.2% of those age 65 or over.

== Education ==
Botkins Local School District operates one elementary school and Botkins High School.

Botkins has a public library, a branch of Shelby County Libraries.

== In popular culture ==
In June 2014, the popular comic Big Nate mentioned Botkins as the birthplace of Coach John.
