= Antwerp High School =

Location
- 303 South Harrmann Rd; Antwerp, Paulding County, Ohio 45813; United States
- Coordinates: 41.182°N 84.744°W

Information
- School type: Public School
- School district: Antwerp Local School District
- NCES District ID: 3904899
- Superintendent: Martin Miller
- CEEB code: 360185
- NCES School ID: 390489903468
- Principal: Travis Lichty
- Teaching staff: 17.00 (FTE)
- Grades: 9-12
- Gender: Co-ed
- Enrollment: 174 (2023–2024)
- International students: 1 (German)
- Average class size: 40-50
- Student to teacher ratio: 10.24
- Hours in school day: 8
- Campuses: 1
- Campus type: Rural Distant
- Colors: Blue and white
- Fight song: Across the Field
- Athletics conference: Green Meadows Conference
- Mascot: Archie
- Team name: Archers
- Rival: Wayne Trace, Hicksville
- Website: www.antwerpschools.org/MiddleHighSchool.aspx

Antwerp High School is a public high school in Antwerp, Ohio. It is the only high school in the Antwerp Local School District. Their nickname is the Archers. They are a member of the Green Meadows Conference. Their biggest rivalry is with Wayne Trace High School.

== Ohio High School Athletic Association State Championships ==
- Girls Volleyball – 1992
- Girls Softball - 2019
