= Indian River Juvenile Correctional Facility =

Juvenile Correctional Facility in Ohio

- Interactive map of Indian River Juvenile Correctional Facility
- Location: 2775 Indian River Rd SW Massillon, Ohio; 40.7663°N 81.5263°W
- Population: 149 (April 2026)
- Opened: 1973
- Managed by: Ohio Department of Youth Services
- Director: Amy Ast
- Website: https://dys.ohio.gov/facilities/indian-river-jcf

Indian River Juvenile Correctional Facility is a youth correctional facility with four buildings across forty acres in Massillon, Stark County, Ohio, approximately 56 miles (90 km) south of Cleveland. It is operated by the Ohio Department of Youth Services and was opened in 1973. The facility houses male juveniles aged 12 to 20 years and is accredited by the American Correctional Association. The facility is known for chronic violence against staff and other inmates. The latest superintendent is Kenneth Black; however, he resigned in April 2026 and no new superintendent has been hired as of yet. As of April 2026, the facility houses 149 boys, but can hold 165 maximum.

== History ==
When the facility first opened in 1973, it housed more than 1,200 inmates, but that number has fallen since then. In the time it has been opened, it has been known for violence against inmates and staff alike. There were on average 10.5 fights and assaults per week in 2023. In 2024, that number became 13.8 fights and assaults per week. On April 2, 2026, following violent assaults and incidents, Director Amy Ast put out a statement saying that Indian River Juvenile Correctional Facility will not be accepting admissions for the rest of the month and will be reducing the number of inmates at Indian River Juvenile Correctional Facility. Due to the new admissions pause, some juvenile inmates are now being sent to local facilities which have put pressure on Stark County to cover the costs of housing the inmate rather than the state.

After an inspection in June 2024 by the Correctional Institution Inspection Committee, it was determined that 15 areas within Indian River Juvenile Correctional Facility were "in need of improvement" including unit and institutional management, behavioral health services, youth discipline, and staff management.

In January 2026, of the reported population of 156 male inmates at the time, 42 were classified as being active gang members and 64 more were identified as passive gang members. The gangs housed at the facility include Heartless Felons and Gangster Disciples.

In January 2026, the inmate population had accumulated a total of 9,977 transitional separation hours, almost 416 days. In that same month, it was also reported that there had been 24 inmate-on-inmate assaults, 26 inmate-on-staff assaults, and 41 uses of force where mechanical restraints were applied.

On February 14, 2026, it was reported that the facility can employ up to 141 Youth Specialists (Juvenile Correctional Officers), 14 Behavioral Health Staff, 25 Teachers, and 115 other supportive roles. Across all fields, there are 295 total roles with 71 vacancies, primarily Youth Specialists. Two months later, the facility still has a high staff vacancy rate: 35% Youth Specialists, 28% Teachers, and 36% Behavioral Health Staff as of April 15, 2026. This understaffing has resulted in some staff working alone with upwards of 23 juveniles at a time and a response time of four minutes for an inmate-on-staff assault.

In April 2026, Superintendent Kenneth Black resigned from his position after maintaining the role since August 2024. His resignation came with no stated reason why.

=== Notable incidents ===
- In March 2019, one 19-year-old, three 18-year-olds, and five other inmates were charged with aggravated rioting stemming from an incident in January which started with a separate inmate throwing urine onto a staff member. The 19-year-old and one 18-year-old were also charged with kidnapping and another 18-year-old was charged with felony vandalism.
- In October 2022, a 19-year-old inmate attacked a Juvenile Correctional Officer with his own radio that resulted in a head injury, multiple surgeries, heart failure, kidney failure, and a reliance on a walker. The inmate later plead guilty to charges of felonious assault and escape. Later that month, twelve teens barricaded themselves inside of the school and caused almost $300,000 worth of damages after a 16-year-old inmate took a staff member's keys and released multiple other inmates from their cells. The twelve hour standoff ended in the deployment of oleoresin capsicum spray and six juveniles going to Stark County jail.
- In July 2024, an inmate gained access to an oleoresin capsicum spray canister and deployed it. Several days later, a staff member was left injured in a housing unit after an assault.
- In September 2025, it was reported that more than 62 inmate-on-staff attacks occurred in that year with various means and methods including hands-only assaults, improvised weaponry including brooms and hammers, and biological attacks including flooding a hallway with toilet water and fecal matter.
- In January 2026, two inmates began fighting resulting in a 15-year-old inmate becoming paralyzed.
- In March 2026, a 14-year-old inmate assaulted a Sergeant from the Ohio Department of Rehabilitation and Correction at the facility while she was working to lighten the understaffing issue at the facility resulting in unconsciousness, dizziness, neck pain, and headaches afterwards. The inmate threw up gang signs after while laughing when interviewed.

=== Escapes ===
- In January 2012, a 15-year-old inmate escaped from the facility for two hours using a temporary interior fence before being apprehended. He stated that he feared being forced to join a gang while incarcerated.
- In April 2017, an inmate escaped by compromising a door and was followed by staff to a store across from the facility where he was apprehended in less than five minutes.
- In April 2018, an inmate walked away from the Pickaway County Bureau of Motor Vehicles office while being escorted by staff to obtain a state ID for his upcoming release. He was apprehended within nineteen minutes.
- In May 2019, two inmates, a 16-year-old and a 17-year-old, escaped from the facility after using a sheet to scale the fence. The 16-year-old was apprehended shortly after escaping. The 17-year-old was apprehended in June 2019 in Miami-Dade County, Florida.

== Programs ==
The facility maintains the following programs across other Ohio Department of Youth Services facilities:

- Substance abuse programming
- Victim awareness
- Sex offender programming
- Freedom Schools
- Gang interventions

Specific to Indian Rivers Juvenile Correctional Facility, they also have the following programs:

- Special Living Units
- Parenting Programs
- Staff-Youth Mentoring Program

There are also educational programs offered including:

- GED
- Academic Programing
- Career-Tech
- Apprenticeship
- Vocational
  - Career-Based Interventions
  - Roofing and Framing
  - Forklift Operation
  - Auto Technology
  - Horticulture
- College Courses
  - Stark State College
  - Sinclair College
