= Botkins High School =

Location
- 404 East State Street; Botkins, Ohio 45306; United States

Information
- School district: Botkins Local Schools
- Superintendent: Jeff McPheron
- Principal: Ryan Loy
- Staff: 16.85 (FTE)
- Grades: K-12
- Enrollment: 283 (2023-2024)
- Average class size: 48
- Student to teacher ratio: 16.80
- Language: English
- Campus: 1 City Block
- Colors: Black, Gold, & White
- Athletics conference: Shelby County Athletic League
- Team name: Trojans
- Rival: Anna Rockets
- Website: https://www.botkins.k12.oh.us/

Botkins High School is a public high school in Botkins, Ohio. It is the only high school in the Botkins Local Schools district. The school serves grades 7–12. The Trojans wear black, gold, and white and compete in the Shelby County Athletic League.

Kent Boyd, a Top 2 finalist on So You Think You Can Dance, graduated from Botkins High School in 2010. BHS is part of Botkins Local School, which serves grades K-12. Botkins Local School is a top 20 best public school in Ohio. Botkins recently moved their school from 208 North Sycamore to 404 East State Street as of 2014.

== Sports ==
OHSAA State Championships

- Boys Basketball - 2021
