= Miami Valley Career Technology Center =

Location
- 6800 Hoke Road; Englewood, Ohio 45315; 39°50′44″N 84°19′44″W

Information
- Former names: Montgomery County Joint Vocational School
- School type: Career-Technical Public/Career and Technical
- Motto: Proud to be MVCTC
- Founded: 1971
- Superintendent: Dr. Nick Weldy
- Grades: 11 - 12
- Secondary years taught: 11th and 12th grades
- Area: Suburban and rural
- Colors: Royal blue and grey
- Mascot: None
- Website: https://district.mvctc.com/

The Miami Valley Career Technology Center (MVCTC) is a public career technology school in Englewood, Ohio. It serves five southwestern Ohio counties (Montgomery, Warren, Preble, Darke, and Miami). Prior to 1994, it was known as the Montgomery County Joint Vocational School.

Students from 27 partner high schools attend classes daily in one of 42 career programs. Students from districts outside the 27 participating schools may attend MVCTC by applying for admission and then by adhering to open enrollment guidelines.

The high school division is approved and accredited by the Ohio Department of Education and North Central Association of Colleges and Schools as a two-year public career technical school. The division offers secondary preparation with in-school and cooperative education programs.

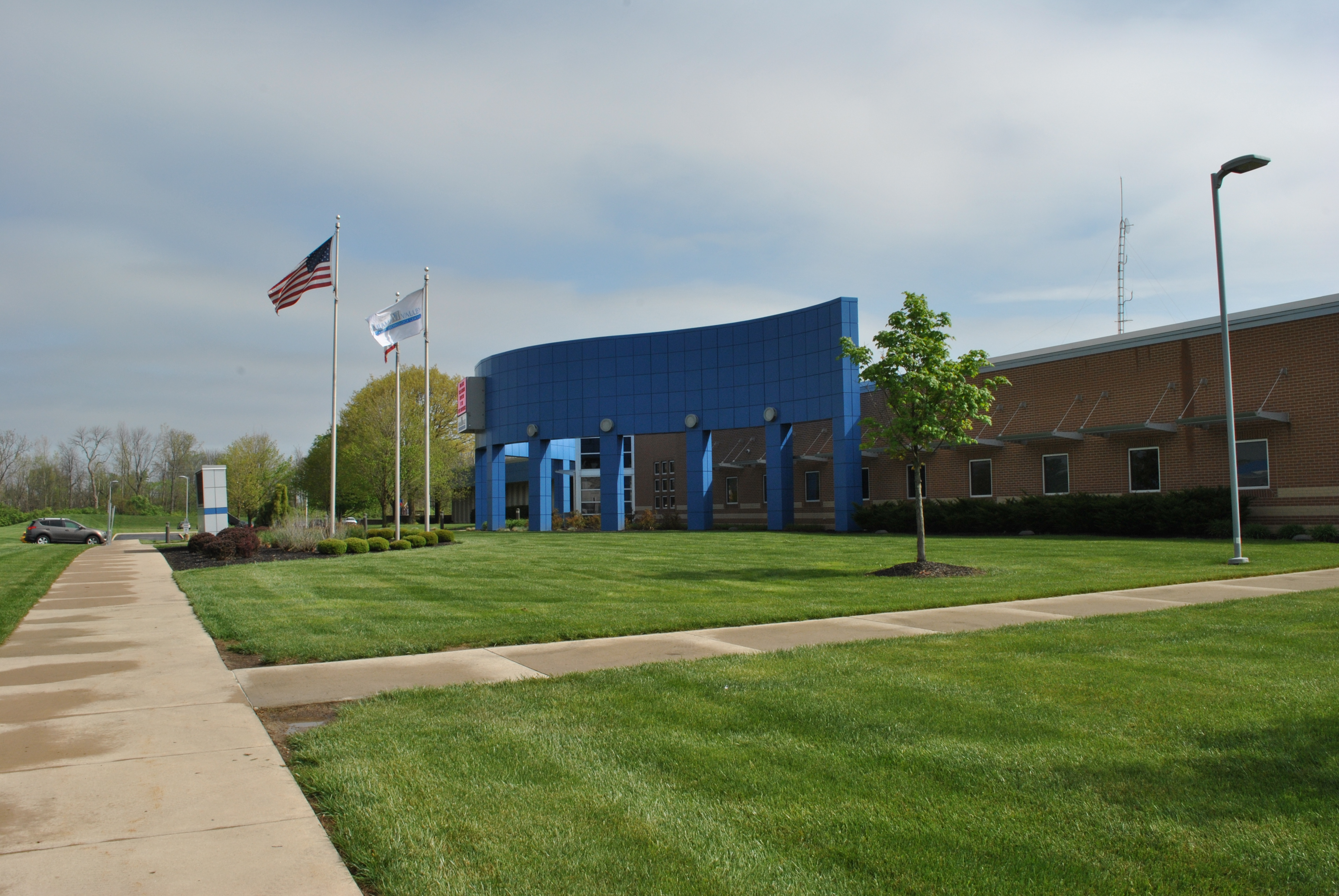
Miami Valley Career Technology Center - Career Technical Education public high school in Miami Valley Region of Ohio

== College Partners ==
- Clark State Community College
- Edison State Community College
- Sinclair Community College
