= Mahoning County High School =

Mahoning Valley Community School

Location
- 2026 South Avenue; Youngstown, Ohio 44505; United States

Information
- Grades: 9-12+
- Campus type: Urban
- Website: www.mahoningvalleycommunityschool.org

Mahoning Valley Community School (formerly Mahoning County High School) is a public community school in Youngstown, Ohio, United States. It works with "at-risk" students and offers high school diplomas for students or adults wanting to get back on track with academics.
