= Adams County Christian School =

Location
- 187 Willow Drive; West Union, Ohio 45693; United States; 40°46′13″N 84°7′11″W

Information
- Religious affiliation: Christian
- Established: 1981
- Principal: Ken Clark
- Teaching staff: 11.9 (on an FTE basis)
- Grades: K–12
- Enrollment: 113 (2017-18)
- Student to teacher ratio: 9.5
- Colors: Red and Black
- Nickname: Eagles
- Website: www.eaglesaccs.com

Adams County Christian School is a private Christian school serving grades K-12 in West Union, Ohio, United States. It was founded in 1981.
