= Wayne Trace High School =

Location
- 4915 US Route 127; Haviland, (Paulding County), Ohio 45851; United States
- Coordinates: 41°02′49″N 84°34′28″W

Information
- Type: Public, Coeducational high school
- Superintendent: Benjamin Winans
- Principal: Mike Myers
- Grades: 7-12
- Enrollment: 404 (2024-2025)
- Colors: Red, White, and Blue
- Athletics conference: Green Meadows Conference
- Nickname: Raiders
- Rival: Crestview Knights, Tinora Rams, Paulding Panthers
- Athletic Director: Jim Linder
- Website: https://www.waynetrace.org/waynetracehighschool_home.aspx

Wayne Trace High School is a public high school in Haviland, Ohio. It is the only high school in the Wayne Trace Local School District. Their mascot is the Raider. They are a member of the Green Meadows Conference. It is a very large district comprising 179 square miles (460 km^{2}). The average class size is from 70 to 90. Wayne Trace High School has several rivalries such as: Tinora, Paulding, and Crestview.

== Ohio High School Athletic Association State Championships ==
- Boys Basketball – 1991
- Boys Basketball Final Four: 1988, 1991, 2001, 2008, 2015
- Football State Runners-Up: 2013
- Cross Country Runners-Up: 1991
