= Coshocton County Career Center =

Coordinates: 40°17′54″N 81°50′50″W

Location
- 23640 Airport Road; Coshocton, Ohio 43812; United States

Information
- School type: Public/career and technical
- Founded: 1978
- Superintendent: Rick Raach
- Principal: Eddie Dovenbarger
- Grades: 11 - 12, Continuing
- Enrollment: 270
- Area: Suburban and Rural
- Colors: Silver & blue
- Mascot: Lobo
- Website: www.coshoctoncareers.org

The Coshocton County Career Center (CCCC) is a Vocational School located in Coshocton County, Ohio. Founded in 1977 as the Coshocton County Joint Vocational School (JVS), its name was officially changed in 1999 to the current one. It is composed mostly of students that are from River View, Ridgewood, and Coshocton high schools, but students from several other area high schools may attend (per Ohio's Open Enrollment Laws.)

== Career and technical organizations ==
CCCC students have the opportunity to participate in several different career and technical student organizations. These clubs include SkillsUSA, DECA, FFA, FCCLA, and AWS. Other activities include the National Technical Honor Society (NTHS), Student Council, and the School Newspaper. They also support an Archery team
