= Patriot Preparatory Academy =

Location
- 4938 Beatrice Drive; Columbus, Ohio, 43227

Information
- School type: Charter
- Established: 2010
- Founder: David McIlrath
- Superintendent: Sean Smith
- Grades: K-12
- Enrollment: 584
- Campus type: Suburban
- Colours: Maroon, White, and Gold
- Mascot: Eagle
- Website: https://patriotprep.com/

Patriot Preparatory Academy is a charter school in Columbus, Ohio. The building was utilized by Liberty Christian Academy/Liberty Preparatory Academy until they moved to a new facility in Pataskala, Ohio in 2010.

== Athletics ==
Patriot Preparatory participates in athletics under the authority of the Ohio High School Athletic Association.

=== Sports ===
Basketball (Boys, 7th, 8th, JV, and Var.)

Basketball (Girls, MS, JV, and Var.)

Basketball (Intramural, K-6th)

Bowling (Var.)

Soccer (Coed, MS and Var.)

Volleyball (Girls, MS, JV, and Var.)

Baseball (Boys, MS and Var.)

Softball (Girls, MS and Var.)

Track and Field (Coed, MS and Var.)

Cheerleading (Coed, MS, JV, and Varsity)

=== Championships/Honors ===
2011- Girls Basketball

2012- Boys Basketball

2017- Hosted first OHSAA Tournament game

2022-23—First school District Championship

== Academics ==
2016 Average Testing Score: 55.2% (2016)

Student Teacher Ratio: 16:1

Reading Proficiency- 79%

Math Proficiency- 56%

Average ACT Score: 20/36

3 Visual Arts classes:

- General Art
- Theater Arts
- Dance

3 Music classes:

- Band
- Choir
- Instrumental and Theory Music

1 Foreign Language class

- Spanish

2 Technology Classes

- Information Technology
- Typing

12 School Clubs/Programs

- Art Club
- Creative Writing
- Debate Club
- Drill Team
- Glee Club
- National Honor Society
- Yearbook
- Before/After School Extended Care
- D4G
- Bible Club
- Queen's Talk
- Student Council
