= LifeSkills Center of Middletown =

Location
- 631 South Breiel Boulevard; Middletown, (Butler County), Ohio 45044; United States
- Coordinates: 39°30′16″N 84°21′13″W

Information
- Type: Public, Coeducational high school
- Opened: 2002
- School district: Independent
- Head teacher: Mrs. Lucas
- Chaplain: Rev. Foster
- Grades: 9-12
- Average class size: 39 (2 graduations per year)
- Student to teacher ratio: 15:2(per classroom)
- Slogan: "We did, You can!"
- Athletics: none
- Accreditation: Ohio Department of Education
- School fees: no enrollment fee
- Tuition: free

Life Skills Center of Middletown is an alternative high school in Middletown, Ohio, United States, operated by LifeSkills' which operates schools in several U.S. states. Life Skills offers an online curriculum designed to help students earn a high school diploma. The school is designed to allow students to be employed full-time or do volunteer work while in high school.
