= Luther E. Ball High School =

- Cuyahoga Hills Juvenile; Correctional Facility

Location
- 4321 Green Road; Highland Hills, (Cuyahoga County), Ohio 44128; United States
- Coordinates: 41°26′39″N 81°30′53″W

Information
- School district: Buckeye United Schools
- NCES District ID: 3900237
- Authority: Ohio Department of Youth Services
- Superintendent: Donald Redwood
- NCES School ID: 390023704674
- Principal: Daniel Hanstein
- Teaching staff: 13.00
- Grades: 9–12
- Enrollment: 107 (2023-2024)
  - Grade 9: 9
  - Grade 10: 14
  - Grade 11: 5
  - Grade 12: 10
- Student to teacher ratio: 8.23
- Website: Correctional Facility Website

Luther E. Ball High School is a high school in Highland Hills, Ohio, at the Cuyahoga Hills Juvenile Correctional Facility.

== History ==
Ohio's department of public works contracted with the Ohio Historical Society in 1967 to build "Cuyahoga Hills boys' school near Warrensville" for $2,470,000. Construction began in September 1967, with an opening date in 1969. Cuyahoga Boys School opened in January 1969. The Lancaster Eagle-Gazette said, "The school, embracing a new concept in correctional education, will serve first offenders... who have been committed from the 88 Juvenile Courts of Ohio."

In April 1969, Pfc. Luther E. Ball Jr., who was briefly at the school prior to enlisting in the U.S. Army, died in Viet Nam. At the end of September 1969, Buckeye United School District renamed the school "Luther E. Ball High School" to honor his memory.

== Description ==
According to the Ohio Department of Youth Services, "The facility is accredited by the American Correctional Association and provides a variety of services and treatment for youth, including a fully accredited high school and middle school." The department requires all youth prisoners who do not have a high school degree to participate in the educational program.

The school offers "a core curriculum, electives, student assessment and testing, guidance, and library services. Special education and supplemental intervention services are also provided, all to help prepare students for the Ohio Graduation Test or the GED".
