= Fairlawn High School =

Location
- 18800 Johnston Rd. Sidney, Ohio 45365; United States

Information
- School district: Fairlawn Local Schools
- Teaching staff: 18.00 (FTE)
- Grades: pre k –12
- Enrollment: 293 (2023-2024)
- Student to teacher ratio: 16.28
- Language: English
- Colors: Blue & White
- Athletics conference: Shelby County Athletic League
- Team name: Jets
- Website: http://www.fairlawn.k12.oh.us/

Fairlawn High School is a public high school east of Sidney, Ohio. It is the only high school in the Fairlawn Local Schools district. Their teams are called the Fairlawn Jets (their logo is also a jet). Their mascot is an unnamed aviator.

Fairlawn High School is also known as Fairlawn Local Schools due to the building being Pre-Kindergarten through 12th grade.

Fairlawn wears blue and white and competes in the Shelby County Athletic League. It is the local public school for the Tawawa, Plattsville, Pemberton, and Pasco communities. Primarily a small school with an average graduating class size of approximately 40 - 50 students, it offers students the ability to participate in many extra curricular activities (such as varsity sports, band, musicals, etc.), but does not have the amenities and/or advanced college preparation classes seen at other schools in the area.
