= The Dayton Regional STEM School =

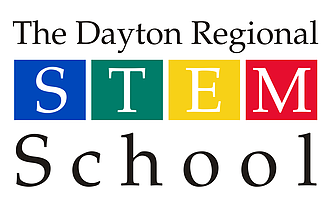

Location
- 1724 Woodman Drive; Kettering, Ohio 45420; United States
- 39°43′37″N 84°07′13″W

Information
- Type: Public Middle and High School
- School district: The Dayton Regional STEM School
- Superintendent: Robin Fisher
- Principal: Nick Pant (high)/Andrew Sears (middle)
- Grades: 6-12
- Enrollment: 720
- Colors: Green; Blue; Yellow; Red
- Website: School website

The Dayton Regional STEM School, often abbreviated DRSS, is located in Kettering, Ohio, United States. Its first class graduated in 2013 after starting in ninth grade. The school utilizes a project based learning (PBL) teaching methodology that prepares students to work in the real world.

== History ==
The Dayton Regional STEM School opened for the 2009–2010 school year, admitting only ninth grade students. The School originally used a facility located in Beavercreek, provided by Wright State University, before moving to its own facility in 2011. Over time the school has expanded, and now provides schooling for grades six through twelve. They added an elementary addition to the school in the field next to it. The elementary school opened in 2025.
