= Ayersville High School =

Location
- 28046 Watson Road; Defiance, (Defiance County), Ohio 43512; United States
- Coordinates: 41°14′14″N 84°17′4″W

Information
- Type: Public, Coeducational high school
- Superintendent: Beth Hench
- Principal: Gene Rupp
- Teaching staff: 20.58 (FTE)
- Grades: 9-12
- Student to teacher ratio: 16.42
- Colors: Columbia Blue and Gold
- Athletics conference: Green Meadows Conference
- Team name: Ayersville
- Website: https://www.ayersville.org/o/ahs

Ayersville High School is a public high school in Highland Twp. near Defiance, Ohio. It is the only high school in the Ayersville Local School district. Their mascot is the Pilots. They are a member of the Green Meadows Conference. Their fight song is “On to Victory” played to the tune of "On Wisconsin", the University of Wisconsin fight song.

== Ohio High School Athletic Association State Championships ==
- Boys Basketball – 1957, 1961
- Boys Baseball – 1997
- Boys Cross Country – 1975
- Girls Track and Field – 1996

== Individual State Champions ==
=== Wrestling ===
Cade Mansfield 2012 Weight class: 120

Abe Delano 2023-24 Weight class: 215

=== Cross Country ===
Noah Fisher, 2018

Jim Jurcevich, 1993

Bill Ankney, 1975

=== Track & Field ===
Jason Jackson, 2002, High Jump

Sarah Dewolfe, 1996, 100m Dash - 200m Dash - 400m Dash

Jim Jurcevich, 1993, 3200m, 1994 - 3200m

== Notable alumni ==
- Chad Reineke, former MLB player (San Diego Padres, Oakland Athletics, Cincinnati Reds)
