= Edgerton High School (Ohio) =

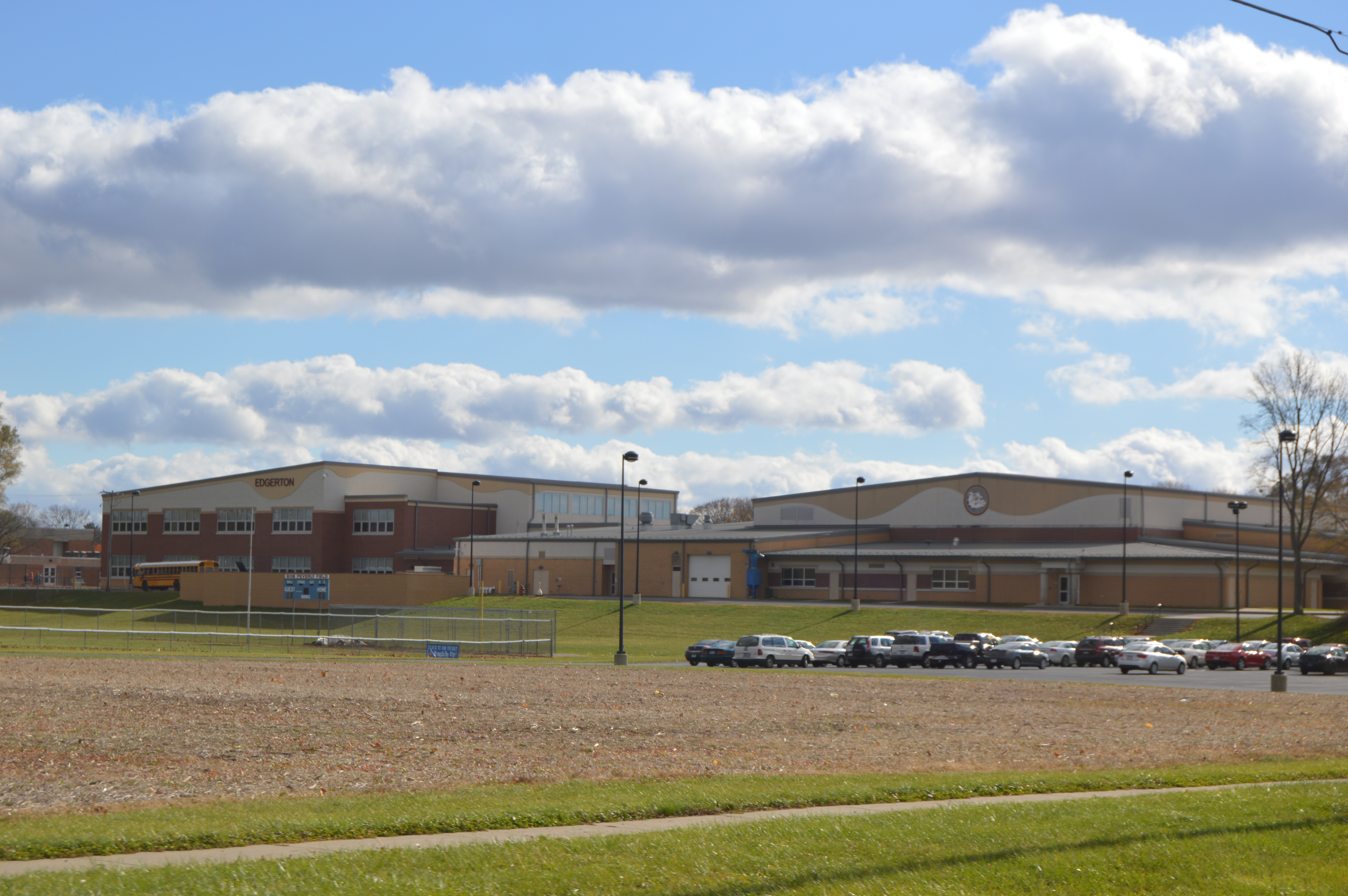
- Northern side, seen from Michigan Avenue

Location
- 111 E River St. Edgerton, (Williams County), Ohio 43517; United States
- Coordinates: 41°27′21″N 84°44′46″W

Information
- Type: Public, Coeducational high school
- Motto: Excellence, Leadership, Service.
- Superintendent: Tim Meister
- Principal: Ben Wilhelm
- Teaching staff: 16.78 (FTE)
- Grades: 7-12
- Enrollment: 257 (2023-2024)
- Student to teacher ratio: 15.32
- Colors: Maroon and White
- Athletics conference: Green Meadows Conference
- Mascot: Bulldog
- Nickname: Bulldogs
- Team name: Edgerton Bulldogs
- Rival: Hicksville Aces
- Yearbook: Log of E
- Athletic Director: Keith Merillat
- Website: https://sites.google.com/edgertonschools.org/els/jhhs/juniorsenior-high-school-page?authuser=0

Edgerton High School is a public high school in Edgerton, Ohio. It is the only high school in the Edgerton Local Schools district. Their mascot is the Bulldog. They are a member of the Green Meadows Conference.

== Notable alumni ==
- Denny Stark, former Major League Baseball player

== Ohio High School Athletic Association State Championships ==
- Boys Basketball – 1959
- Wrestling Individual champions
  - Keven Miller - 1976, 145 lbs
  - Tom Nye - 1990, 145 lbs
  - Tom Nye - 1991, 152 lbs
  - Jeraco Speelman - 1996, 160 lbs
- Track and Field Individual Champions
  - Richard Lutterbein 1942
  - Cathy Taylor 1981
  - Kylee Studer 800 Meter 1997
  - Kylee Studer 800 Meter 1998
