= Tinora High School (Defiance, Ohio) =

Location
- 5921 Domersville Road; Defiance, (Defiance County), Ohio 43512; United States; 41°21′23″N 84°19′22″W

Information
- Type: Public, Coeducational high school
- Established: 1965
- School district: Northeastern Local
- Superintendent: Nicole Wells
- Principal: Alex Nafziger
- Teaching staff: 12.00 (FTE)
- Grades: 9-12
- Student to teacher ratio: 22.67
- Colors: Green and White
- Fight song: On, Wisconsin!
- Athletics conference: Green Meadows Conference
- Mascot: Rambo
- Team name: Rams
- Rival: Ayersville Pilots
- Website: http://www.tinora.k12.oh.us

Tinora High School is a public high school near Defiance, Ohio, USA. It is the only high school in the Northeastern Local Schools district, whose nickname is the Tinora Rams, taken from the team mascot. The district is a member of the Green Meadows Conference. Tinora has rivalries with schools such as Fairview, Ayersville, & Wayne Trace. It first opened in 1965.

== School history ==
Information pertaining to early schools of Defiance County is lacking, but a study conducted by T. C. Holy in 1937 revealed that a school was organized and conducted by William Seamans in Defiance the winter of 1824 and 1825. It might be assumed that this was the first school taught in Williams County, which at that time embraced the present counties of Williams and Defiance. Defiance County was formed March 4, 1845, from Williams, Henry, and Paulding Counties. It received its name from Fort Defiance, built in 1794, by General Anthony Wayne at the junction of the Maumee and Auglaize Rivers.

The first building erected for school purposes was located between the old canal and the Maumee River. This schoolhouse was used until 1836, when classes were then held in the lower story of the courthouse until 1841. In 1841, a tax levied and a two-story brick building was erected.

The four townships which now comprise the Northeastern Local District are Noble, Richland (partial), Tiffin, and Adams Townships of Defiance County. The name "Tinora" results from combining the names of the townships that comprise the Northeastern Local School district.

TI - Tiffin

NO - Noble

R - Richland

A - Adams

Noble Township was organized in 1822 and named after Calvin Noble. The first school was taught by W. W. Sellick in a double log cabin. Richland Township was organized in 1824. The Maumee River divides this township into two distinct parts. That part north of the river is known as North Richland and it is this part that is located in Northeastern Local School District. The first school was taught by Peter Tittle in 1828.

Tiffin Township was organized in 1832, and named, as was the river which runs through it from North to South, after Edward Tiffin, the first governor of Ohio. There were ten school houses in the township in 1883, and a new high school was built in 1920. Adams Township was organized in 1836. This township occupies the northeast corner of Defiance County. The first school was taught by Mrs. Tuffs in 1837. By 1883, there were eight school buildings in the township.

By 1935-36 there were five elementary buildings in Adams Township; one elementary and one 12-graded building in North Richland; four elementary buildings in Noble; and six elementary and one high school in Tiffin Township.

The Defiance County School Board’s records reveal that on April 1, 1938, a petition signed by about 710 resident electors, was presented to the board requesting that Adams Township School District and North Richland School District be combined into one district in order that a new school might be built in the center; and that all of Adams Township could stay together and remain a part of the Defiance County School District.

The Defiance County Board of Education met on May 13, 1938, and approved the reorganization plan. Tiffin, Noble, and North Richland-Adams School Districts closed many of their one-teacher schools. Kibble was closed in the Tiffin District. Meincke, Mattack, Helberg, Behrens, and Domersville were closed in the North Richland-Adams District. Buckskin was closed in the Noble District. The North Richland-Adams School was opened in 1939 to accommodate grades 1-12 and is still in operation, however, it was sold to the Northwest Ohio Educational Service Center in 2002 and is known as the IEC or the Independent Educational Center.

More of the one-teacher type schools were closed in 1940. Hockman and Figley were eliminated in the Tiffin District. The North Richland-Adams District also closed Dannenburg in 1940.

The one-teacher Kelly School closed in 1946, followed by the Blacksea School in 1947. Cain, Gurwell, and Evansport closed in 1948. In the same year the high school in Tiffin Township lost its charter. In order to accommodate increased enrollment, the Brunersburg building received additional construction in 1952, as did the Tiffin Building in 1954.

In June 1957, the districts Tiffin, Noble, and North Richland-Adams were consolidated into the Northeastern Local, and became effective in July 1957.

Six years later in 1963, Tinora High School was completed for grades 9-12. This was followed in December 1970 by an addition to the high school to be used as a junior high school. The final major building consisted of the addition to the Noble Building.

In 1999 a levy was placed on the ballot for construction of a new elementary school and it passed. In January 2002 students moved into the new building located North of the Tinora High School. The Tiffin building was bulldozed and North Richland-Adams was sold to the Northwest Ohio Educational Service Center in 2002. In 2021, Noble Elementary School closed and the building was demolished.

In 2017 a levy was placed and passed for the construction of a new middle and high school. The original junior/high school was demolished in 2020 and replaced with the new combined fifth through twelfth grade building. This new building was completed in 2021.

== Student clubs ==
Art Club, Band, Fellowship of Christian Athletes, FFA, German Club, National Honor Society, Quiz Bowl, Ram Radicals, Science Club, Show Choir, Sensations, Spanish Club, Student Council, Tinora Yearbook, T-Ram News, and Mock Trial.

== Student athletics ==
Baseball, Bowling, Boys Basketball, Cheerleading, Cross Country, Girls Basketball, Golf, Gymnastics, Football, Softball, Swimming/Diving, Track & Field, Volleyball, Wrestlerettes, Wrestling

== Notable attendees ==
Sam Hornish attended while in Elementary and Jr. High Mrs. Universe 2021 Tori Hope Petersen attended while in High School

== Athletics ==
=== Ohio High School Athletic Association State Championships ===
- Baseball - 2014

Team State Championships 2012 4x100 Meter Dash State Champions Dylan Hall, Kipp McCann, Kurt Kahle, and Chris Strup

2013 4x100 Meter Dash State Champions Kenzie Hall, Ashton Otte, Chelsey Seifert, and Tori Abdul

== Individual State Champions ==
2012 State Track Champion DIII 100 Meter Dash-Chris Strup

2012 State Track Champion DIII 200 Meter Dash-Chris Strup

2011 State Track Champion DIII 100 Meter Dash-Chris Strup

2011 State Track Champion DIII 200 Meter Dash-Chris Strup

2005 State Wrestling Champion DIII 125 lbs Matt Bloniarz

2004 State Track Champion DIII Long Jump—Kevin McCann

2003 State Track Champion DIII Long Jump—Kevin McCann

2001 State Track Champion DIII 1600 Meter Run—Nick Smith

2001 State Track Champion DIII 3200 Meter Run—Nick Smith

1985 State Wrestling Champion DIII Heavyweight Class—Michael Backhaus
