= Temple Christian School (Mansfield, Ohio) =

Location
- 752 N. Stewart Rd. Mansfield, Ohio 44907
- Coordinates: 40.778572°N 82.474286°W

Information
- Type: Private
- Colors: Purple & Gold
- Athletics conference: Independent
- Mascot: Crusaders
- Information: (419) 589-9707
- Website: http://templechristian.org/

Temple Christian School is a private K-12 Christian school in Mansfield, Ohio, United States.

== Athletics ==
The Temple Christian Crusaders are independent of an athletic league. They compete in the following sports:

Fall Sports	Winter Sports
Boys Soccer (Varsity, Junior High); Volleyball (Varsity, JV, Junior High)	Boys Basketball (Varsity, JV, Junior High); Girls Basketball (Varsity, Junior High); Girls Cheerleading (Varsity)

The soccer field is located at 998 Beal Rd. in Mansfield.
