= Ralph C. Starkey High School =

- Circleville Juvenile Correctional Facility

Location
- 604 Island Road; Circleville, (Pickaway County), Ohio 43113; United States
- Coordinates: 39°36′55″N 82°57′06″W

Information
- School district: Buckeye United Schools
- Authority: Ohio Department of Youth Services
- Superintendent: Maryalice Turner
- Principal: Robert McQuate
- Grades: 9–12
- Website: Correctional Facility Website

Ralph C. Starkey High School is a high school in Circleville, Ohio. It is a part of the Circleville Juvenile Correctional Facility. All youth prisoners who do not have a high school diploma are required to participate in the educational program.
