= Massillon Christian School =

Coordinates: 40°47′06″N 81°32′07″W

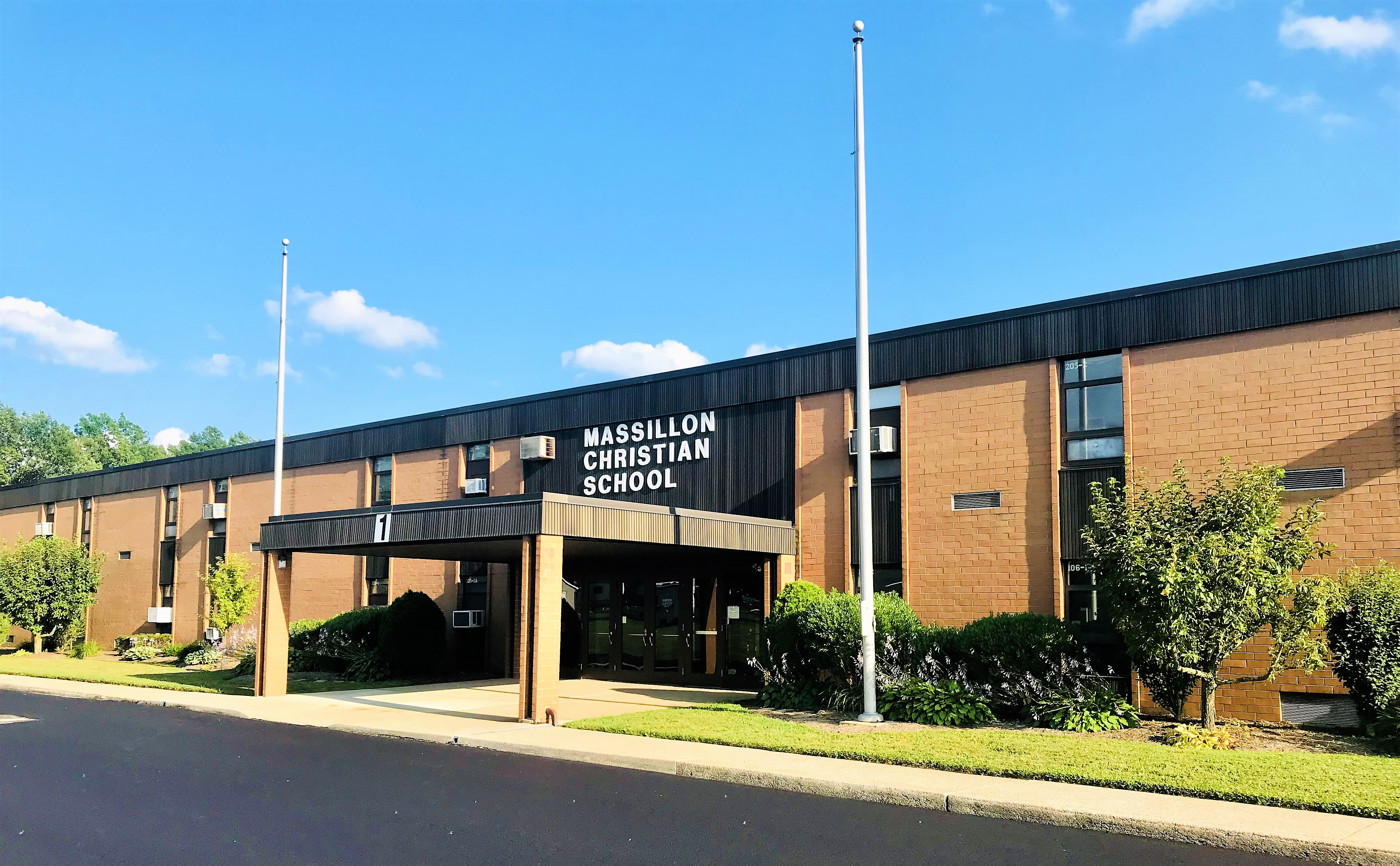
- Massillon, Stark County, Ohio; United States

Information
- Established: 1973; 53 years ago
- Grades: K-8
- Gender: Mixed
- Website: www.massillonchristianschool.com

Massillon Christian School (MCS) is a private Christian school in Massillon, Ohio. It is a ministry of the Massillon Baptist Temple.

MCS is a private co-ed Independent Baptist ministry emphasizing Christian character and biblical principles. Classes are available for grades Kindergarten to 8th.

== History ==
MCS was founded in 1973 by Dr. Bruce D. Cummons (1924-2004) and the Massillon Baptist Temple.

== Athletics ==
MCS provides athletics for both young men and young women. The school's sports teams are nicknamed the Chargers. MCS is a part of the Ohio Christian School Athletic Association. The sports offered are: varsity boys soccer, varsity boys basketball, varsity boys baseball, junior varsity boys basketball, junior high soccer, junior high basketball, varsity girls volleyball, junior varsity girls volleyball, junior high girls volleyball, and varsity girls basketball.
