= Hillcrest Training School =

Hillcrest Academy
- Hamilton County Juvenile Court

Location
- 246 Bonham Road; Cincinnati, (Hamilton County), Ohio 45215; United States; 39°14′40″N 84°29′6″W

Information
- Established: 1850; 176 years ago
- Status: Hillcrest Academy is temporarily closed. Hamilton County Juvenile Court is in the process of selecting a new provider or providers to run the facility. It is expected to reopen in fall 2024. To read more, visit the Juvenile Court website at https://juvenile-court.org/
- Authority: Hamilton County Juvenile Court
- Grades: 7–12
- Website: School Info Page

Hillcrest Academy is located in Springfield Township at 246 Bonham Road, Cincinnati, Ohio 45215. There are 22 on-site buildings comprising 91,329 total gross square feet. Buildings include 12 unattached housing units, gymnasium, recreation hall, chapel, 13-classroom school building, indoor swimming pool, dining hall, and administrative offices. The Hillcrest site has been in constant use as a school and residential facility for delinquent and dependent children since 1914. It is temporarily closed for renovation and repair by Hamilton County. An RFP to re-open the site as a residential treatment program was issued in December 2023. The plan includes up to a total of 144 placement beds for children found delinquent by the Court, children with mental and behavioral health concerns and children in need of respite care. All children will be residents of Hamilton County and placed by Hamilton County Juvenile Court.

== Background ==
Hillcrest School traces its roots back to 1850 when the City of Cincinnati opened a school for delinquent boys and girls. When the city ran into financial issues running the separate boys and girls schools, the Hamilton County Welfare Board and Cincinnati Public Schools jointly took over in the late 1930s. In the late 1970s, a new facility was built and the Hamilton County Juvenile Court took over authority.

== Academics ==
A new education provider is in the process of being selected. Hillcrest offers Science, History, Math, and English courses that are required and count towards high school graduation in the state of Ohio.

== Athletics ==
Athletics are expected to be part of the educational offerings when Hillcrest is reopened with baseball.
