= Hicksville High School (Ohio) =

Location
- 958 East High Street; Hicksville, (Defiance County), Ohio 43526; United States
- Coordinates: 41°18′8″N 84°44′47″W

Information
- Type: Public, Coeducational high school
- Superintendent: Keith Countryman
- Principal: Aaron Hylander
- Teaching staff: 19.13 (FTE)
- Grades: 7-12
- Student to teacher ratio: 10.93
- Colors: Red and White
- Athletics conference: Green Meadows Conference
- Mascot: Ace
- Team name: Aces
- Rival: Fairview, Antwerp
- Website: hicksvilleschools.org

Hicksville High School is a public high school in Hicksville, Ohio. It is the only high school in the Hicksville Schools district. Their nickname is the Aces. They are a member of the Green Meadows Conference.

== Ohio High School Athletic Association State Championships ==
- Boys Baseball – 1978
