= Ansonia High School (Ohio) =

Location
- 600 East Canal Street; Ansonia, (Darke County), Ohio 45303; United States; 40°12′55″N 84°37′45″W

Information
- Type: Public, coeducational high school
- Motto: "Committed to Excellence"
- School district: Ansonia Local Schools
- Superintendent: Jim Atchley
- Principal: Steve Garman
- Grades: 9-12
- Colors: Orange and black
- Athletics conference: Western Ohio Athletic Conference
- Team name: Tigers
- Website: http://www.ansonia.k12.oh.us

Ansonia High School is a public high school in Ansonia, Ohio, United States. It is the only high school in the Ansonia Local Schools District.

== See also ==
- Education in the United States
- List of high schools in Ohio
