= Ansonia, Ohio =

- Village
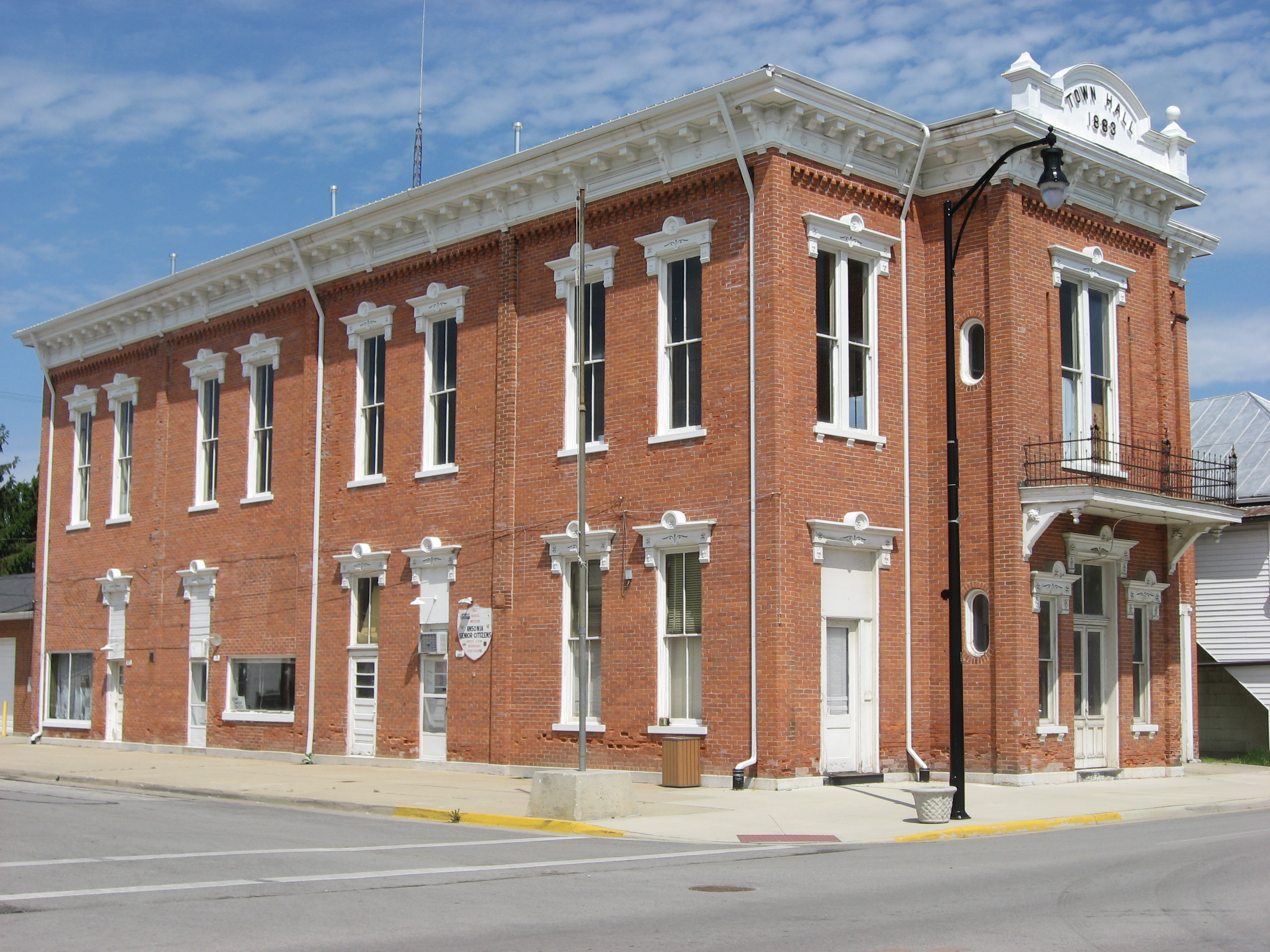
- Brown Township Building in downtown Ansonia

- Location in Darke County and the state of Ohio.

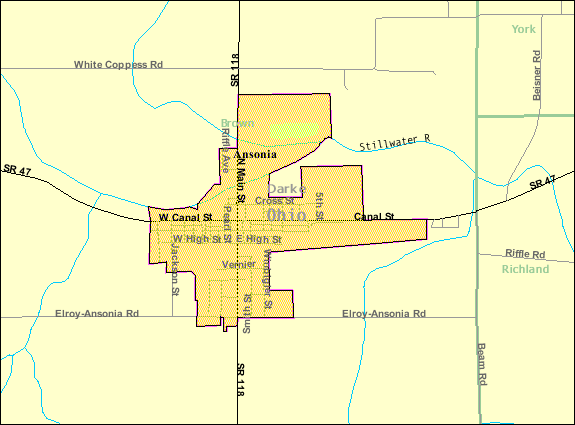
- Detailed map of Ansonia
- Coordinates: 40°12′49″N 84°38′05″W
- Country: United States
- State: Ohio
- County: Darke
- Township: Brown

Government
  - Mayor: Ted Adkins
  - Public Works Director: Don DeMange
  - City Councilman: Mike Hacker, John Middleton, Dan Brown

Area
  - Total: 0.67 sq mi (1.73 km^{2})
  - Land: 0.65 sq mi (1.68 km^{2})
  - Water: 0.019 sq mi (0.05 km^{2})
- Elevation: 1,001 ft (305 m)

Population (2020)
  - Total: 1,160
  - Estimate (2023): 1,149
  - Density: 1,791.8/sq mi (691.83/km^{2})
- Time zone: UTC-5 (Eastern (EST))
  - Summer (DST): UTC-4 (EDT)
- ZIP code: 45303
- Area codes: 937, 326
- FIPS code: 39-02120
- GNIS feature ID: 2397968
- Website: Village website

Ansonia is a village in Darke County, Ohio, United States. The population was 1,160 at the 2020 census.

== History ==
Ansonia was founded in 1845 under the name of "Dallas." The village initially grew slowly; significant expansion only came after the coming of a railroad in 1852. Because dense swamps hindered settlement in the vicinity, woodland was plentiful, and Ansonia became a center of manufacturing for hardwood products. In 1873, the residents replaced their old school with a substantial two-story building at the cost of ten thousand dollars; this building was the first home of Ansonia High School, which was founded in that year. In turn, this building was demolished and a replacement erected in 1903. Another prominent structure in the village was a mausoleum; built of marble in 1911, it was the first mausoleum in Darke County.

In its early decades, Ansonia was heavily influenced by Freemasonry. The community's first lodge was chartered on October 21, 1874, with a membership of sixteen; in its first forty years, this lodge expanded nearly eightfold. An IOOF lodge was instituted on June 18, 1875, with sixteen members; it grew nearly sevenfold in its first forty years. Sixteen women in the community founded a chapter of the Daughters of Rebekah in 1894, and a lodge of the Knights of Pythias was also established in the village in 1889.

== Geography ==
According to the United States Census Bureau, the village has a total area of 0.81 square miles (2.10 km^{2}), of which 0.79 square miles (2.05 km^{2}) is land and 0.02 square miles (0.05 km^{2}) is water. It is approximately six miles north of the county seat of Greenville.

== Demographics ==
Historical population
| Census | Pop. | Note | %± |
|---|---|---|---|
| 1880 | 542 | | — |
| 1890 | 676 | | 24.7% |
| 1900 | 676 | | 0.0% |
| 1910 | 656 | | −3.0% |
| 1920 | 807 | | 23.0% |
| 1930 | 651 | | −19.3% |
| 1940 | 712 | | 9.4% |
| 1950 | 877 | | 23.2% |
| 1960 | 1,002 | | 14.3% |
| 1970 | 1,044 | | 4.2% |
| 1980 | 1,267 | | 21.4% |
| 1990 | 1,279 | | 0.9% |
| 2000 | 1,145 | | −10.5% |
| 2010 | 1,174 | | 2.5% |
| 2020 | 1,160 | | −1.2% |
| 2023 (est.) | 1,149 | ▼ | −0.9% |
U.S. Decennial Census

=== 2010 census ===
As of the census of 2010, there were 1,174 people, 448 households, and 322 families living in the village. The population density was 1,486.1 inhabitants per square mile (573.8/km^{2}). There were 500 housing units at an average density of 632.9 per square mile (244.4/km^{2}). The racial makeup of the village was 98.8% White, 0.3% Native American, 0.2% Asian, 0.2% from other races, and 0.6% from two or more races. Hispanic or Latino of any race were 1.6% of the population.

There were 448 households, of which 37.5% had children under the age of 18 living with them, 50.0% were married couples living together, 14.5% had a female householder with no husband present, 7.4% had a male householder with no wife present, and 28.1% were non-families. 21.9% of all households were made up of individuals, and 9.6% had someone living alone who was 65 years of age or older. The average household size was 2.62, and the average family size was 3.02.

The median age in the village was 35.4 years. 27.6% of residents were under the age of 18; 9.3% were between the ages of 18 and 24; 25.1% were from 25 to 44; 27.5% were from 45 to 64, and 10.3% were 65 years of age or older. The gender makeup of the village was 48.5% male and 51.5% female.

=== 2000 census ===
As of the census of 2000, there were 1,145 people, 451 households, and 331 families living in the village. The population density was 1,717.0 inhabitants per square mile (662.9/km^{2}). There were 479 housing units at an average density of 718.3 per square mile (277.3/km^{2}). The racial makeup of the village was 99.13% White, 0.26% Native American, 0.52% from other races, and 0.09% from two or more races. Hispanic or Latino of any race were 1.40% of the population.

There were 451 households, out of which 35.3% had children under the age of 18 living with them, 55.9% were married couples living together, 11.1% had a female householder with no husband present, and 26.6% were non-families. 23.3% of all households were made up of individuals, and 10.0% had someone living alone who was 65 years of age or older. The average household size was 2.54, and the average family size was 2.99.

In the village, the population was spread out, with 27.7% under the age of 18, 8.6% from 18 to 24, 30.0% from 25 to 44, 21.3% from 45 to 64, and 12.5% who were 65 years of age or older. The median age was 34 years. For every 100 females, there were 97.8 males. For every 100 females age 18 and over, there were 100.5 males.

The median income for a household in the village was $35,882, and the median income for a family was $38,529. Males had a median income of $28,452 versus $22,460 for females. The per capita income for the village was $16,633. About 4.2% of families and 7.0% of the population were below the poverty line, including 12.7% of those under age 18 and 1.7% of those age 65 or over.
