= Eleanor Gerson School =

Location
- 10427 Detroit Avenue; Cleveland, (Cuyahoga County), Ohio 44102; United States
- Coordinates: 41°28′50″N 81°45′33″W

Information
- Type: Public, Coeducational high school alternative school
- Established: 1970
- Oversight: Applewood Centers
- Grades: 6-12
- Slogan: Gerson Gets Me
- Website: School website

The Eleanor Gerson School is a coeducational alternative day school for students in grades 6 through 12. The school serves a variety of students, including those with emotional or behavioral difficulties, who have been bullied, or have poor social skills/peer relationships.

The curriculum at The Gerson School closely mirrors that of most home districts. Classrooms typically have six to ten students, and are organized based on how students are most likely to focus and learn. All major academic subjects are offered in addition to many electives, including financial literacy government, history, music, social emotional learning, art, and film.

The Gerson School was opened in 1970 by the Society of Friends. It is located in Cleveland, Ohio.
