= Tree of Life Christian Schools =

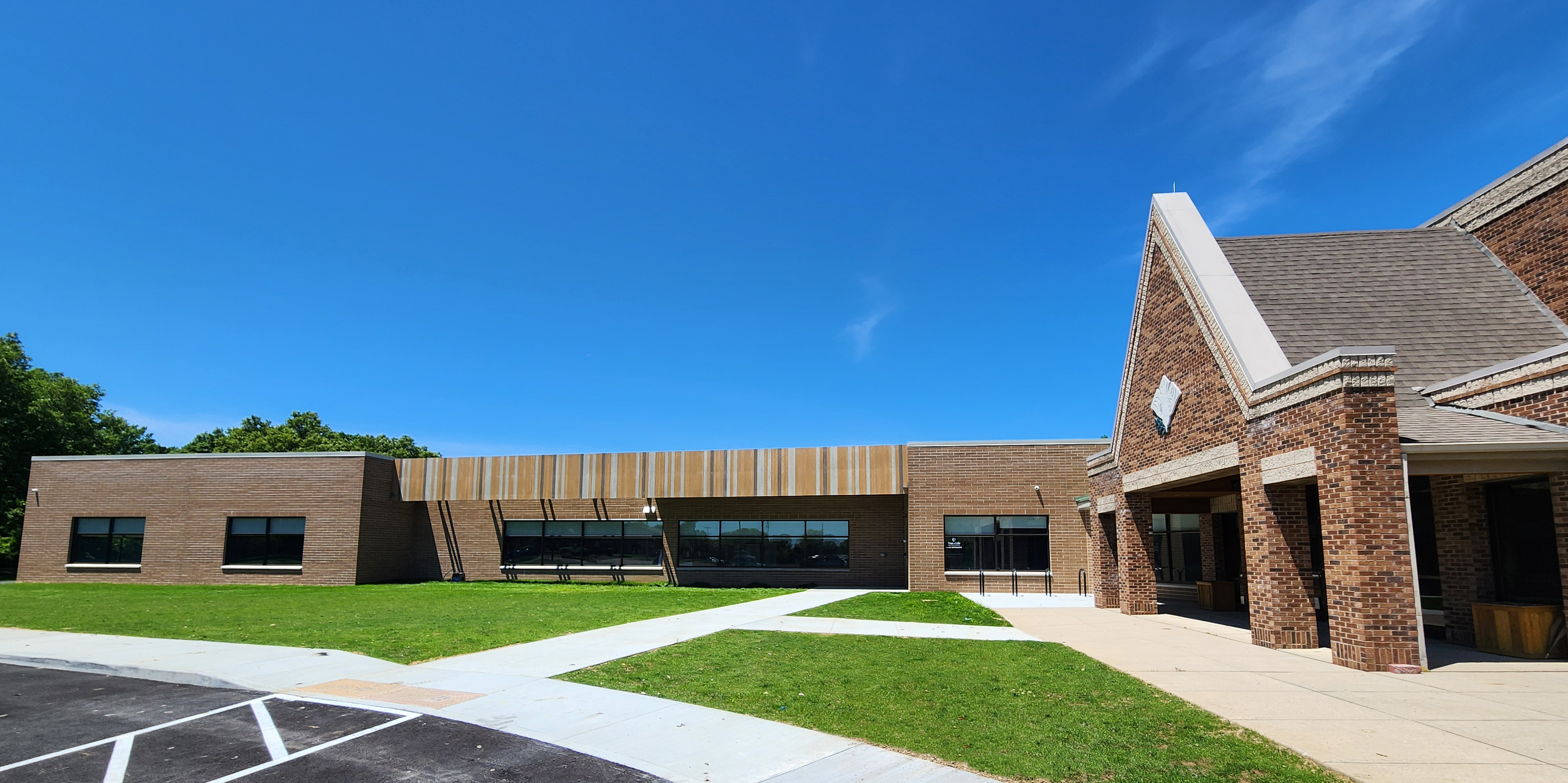
- Middle School Campus

Location
- 935 Northridge Road; Columbus, (Franklin County), Ohio 43224; United States
- 40°2′27″N 82°59′27″W

Information
- Type: Private Christian
- Religious affiliation: Non-denominational Christian
- Established: 1978
- Superintendent: Todd Marrah
- Principal: Brent Davis (9-12), Mary Bondurant (6-8), Colleen Hoffman, Judy Hoban, Sarah Eder
- Grades: Pre-K–12
- Colors: Green and Navy
- Athletics: Baseball, Basketball, Cross-country, Golf, Soccer, Softball, Track and Field, Volleyball
- Athletics conference: Mid-Ohio Christian Athletic League
- Mascot: Trojan
- Team name: Trojans
- Accreditation: Cognia - AdvancED ACSI- Association of Christian Schools International
- Website: http://www.tolcs.org

Tree of Life Christian Schools is a private, college preparatory Christian school located in Columbus, Ohio. It serves preschool, primary, and secondary students. Tree of Life operates five campuses in central Ohio - three preschool/elementary campuses, one middle school, and one high school.

== Campuses ==
Tree of Life Christian Schools consists of three elementary schools, one middle school, and one high school. All of the campuses are part of the same school system and all following the same standards, curriculum, and district office.

Elementary Campuses

Tree of Life has three elementary campuses. The Clintonville campuses is located just south of Worthington, OH near Morse Road. The Dublin campus is located inside of Discover Christian Church off of Sawmill Road. The Polaris Campus is located on the site of the Rock City Church Polaris campus off of Gemini Parkway.

High School and Middle School Campuses

The High School and Middle School campuses are located 1.5 miles apart in north Columbus.

Tree of Life opened its separate middle school campus in 2024 on the property formerly owned by Christian Assembly Church. Up until that time, the middle school and high school shared the same building. Christian Assembly church still operates at the middle school property on Karl Rd.

== History ==
In the spring of 1978, members from the Linden Church of Christ, Beechwold Church of Christ, and Minerva Park Church of Christ came together to form the first school board of what was then called Linden Christian School. Over the years, Northeast Church of Christ, Indianola Church of Christ, Westerville Christian Church, North Park Church of Christ, Discover Christian Church, Hilliard Church of Christ, Worthington Christian Church, and Rock City Church joined the effort.

The initial student body was 47 students, preschool - grade 3.

Jayne Marrah, Tree of Life's first administrator, began with four other faculty. The school has grown to over 175 staff members.

Initially housed in the Linden Church of Christ, the school now has 5 campus locations (3 elementary, 1 middle, and 1 high school) and a district central office.

The school is accredited by the Association of Christian Schools, International (ACSI) and by AdvancED (Cognia).

== Notable alumni ==
- Jay DeMarcus - bassist and harmony vocalist for the country band Rascal Flatts
- Josh Dun - drummer of the music duo Twenty One Pilots
