= Graham School (Columbus, Ohio) =

The Graham School

Location
- 3950 Indianola Avenue; Columbus, (Franklin County), Ohio 43214; United States
- Coordinates: 40°2′43″N 82°59′58″W

Information
- Type: Public, Coeducational, Charter high school
- Motto: Encounter the World, Engage the Mind.
- Established: 2000
- Sister school: The Charles School at Ohio Dominican University; Graham Elementary and Middle School (GEMS)
- School district: Graham Family of Schools
- Dean: Evan Rulong
- Grades: 9-12
- Colors: Red, Black, and Yellow
- Mascot: Dragon
- Affiliation: Expeditionary Learning Schools
- Website: thegrahamschool.org

The Graham School (or TGS) is a tuition-free public 4-year high school (grades 9–12) charter school located in Columbus, Ohio, United States. Its focus is experiential learning in a small-school setting where all students are known by all staff members.
