= Harry A. Hyman =

American track and field athlete (1881–1965)

Personal information
- Born: May 4, 1881 Mount Vernon, Ohio, US
- Education: Ohio State University, University of Pennsylvania

Sport
- Sport: Track and field
- Event: Sprint

Harry A. Hyman (1881 – 1965), also known as The Pennsylvania Flyer, was an American track and field athlete. He competed at state and national levels with Ohio State University and the University of Pennsylvania. He was the only runner at English Amateur Athletic Championships in 1905, to win a handicapped first-place medal in the 220.

== Early life and athletic career ==
Hyman's family background was rooted in immigrant heritage, with his father hailing from Germany. His journey in athletics began in 1899 at Ohio State University, where, at the age of 18, he started competing. He set a 10-second record in the 100-yard dash, securing a first-place victory.

He pursued a degree in Civil Engineering and participated in athletic meets representing the University of Pennsylvania. One of his notable victories was in the 220-yard dash at a meet sponsored by the Princeton Athletic Association on April 18, 1903.

In the same year, he earned a gold medal for the 1-mile relay at a meet against Columbia University. Princeton and Columbia were fierce rivals on the track during his tenure.

== Notable achievements ==
In 1904, Hyman won the gold medal in the Penn-Amherst relay.

In 1904, at the English Amateur Athletic Championships, Hyman won the 220-yard event and the handicapped 300-yard event. Despite a 2-yard handicap, he won, earning recognition at an international level.

== Legacy and later career ==
Hyman was invited to the 1906 Olympic Games, though his career in civil engineering prevented him from attending.

In 1905, he also won an intercollegiate quarter mile at Franklin Field in Pennsylvania, clocking 49 2-5 seconds. His collection of medals, trophies, and awards was exhibited at the Helms Bakery Sports Museum in Los Angeles.

Hyman retired to Laguna Beach, California, and died in 1965.
