= John Freshwater =

American creationist and former teacher

- Born: June 22, 1956 (age 70); United States
- Occupation: Former school teacher
- Known for: Advocate of creationism and intelligent design and allegedly burned students
- Spouse: Nancy Freshwater
- Children: Three

John Freshwater (born June 22, 1956) is a former science teacher at Mount Vernon Middle School in Mount Vernon, Ohio, who was dismissed by the Board of Education for teaching creationism in a public school.

Freshwater was suspended without pay and requested a public administrative hearing, which began in October 2008 and concluded in January 2011 with the hearing referee recommending the school board terminate Freshwater's teaching contract. One week later, the Board terminated Freshwater's contracts. Additionally, Freshwater was involved with two federal court cases regarding the accusations, one brought against him by the student because Freshwater burned a cross into his arm, which was settled out of court, and in the other Freshwater sued his employers, which he later withdrew. Freshwater appealed his termination, but the appeals were denied by two different appeal courts and the Supreme Court of Ohio.

== Personal life ==
Freshwater taught at Mount Vernon Middle School from 1987 until he was suspended in 2008 and officially terminated in January 2011 following two years of hearings. He is currently (2017) teaching at Akron Preparatory Academy. He has a Bachelor's degree in Education from Ohio University and an Associate's degree in Recreation and Wildlife from Hocking College. He is married and has three children.

In 2011, Freshwater told The Columbus Dispatch he sold his home on several acres to a former student to pay his legal costs and lives with his wife and daughter in a Mount Vernon rental home.

== Investigation, lawsuits, and hearing ==
=== Investigation and school board termination hearing ===
In April 2008, Freshwater publicly claimed he was told by school administration to remove a Bible off his desk, but refused. This prompted some students to hold a rally in support of Freshwater a few days later. Subsequently, the school released a statement the following week, in part, "The allegations against Mr. Freshwater are very serious. This is not about his personal Bible on his desktop. It is about the totality of his conduct." At that time, he was under investigation for preaching his religion to his students, teaching creationism, encouraging prayer and burning students with a Christian cross with an electric lab instrument. Freshwater's lawyer described the complaints as "fabrications."

In June 2008, the local school board voted unanimously to initiate termination proceedings against Freshwater after an independent investigative report concluded Freshwater preached creationism, claimed evolution is discredited and did not teach the required science curriculum. It was publicly revealed that as early as 2006, he was told to stop teaching creationism and intelligent design, but he continued to do so. In addition, the investigative report included photos of a child's arm with burn markings in the shape of a cross. The report also included the claim that several teachers complained for eleven years that Freshwater was teaching evolution incorrectly. Freshwater was also accused of shocking a special-needs student in the back after telling him to pick up a test tube, though Freshwater said he might have touched the student inadvertently as the boy walked past him. Further, it was alleged that he had used material from Answers in Genesis, Jonathan Wells' Icons of Evolution, and Kent Hovind to cast doubt on evolution and had assigned students to see the pro-intelligent design movie Expelled: No Intelligence Allowed for extra credit. According to CNN, "The report also cites evidence that Mr. Freshwater told his students that 'science is wrong because the Bible states that homosexuality is a sin and so anyone who is gay chooses to be gay and is therefore a sinner'."

==== 2008 appeal ====
In July 2008, Freshwater appealed the decision by requesting a public administrative hearing, as allowed under Ohio Revised Code 3319.16, and the school board began holding hearings in October that included testimony from students, parents, teachers, and administrators regarding the board's grounds for termination. The termination hearing, refereed by attorney R. Lee Shepherd, was sporadic with testimony being heard on nearly 40 days over the span of almost two years. At the end of the hearing, the referee would decide if the board had sufficient grounds to terminate Freshwater's contract and present the school board with a non-binding recommendation. During the entirety of the hearing procedures, Freshwater was suspended without pay.

In the hearing, both parties called medical experts to testify on the use of a Tesla coil on students. The experts only had access to the photos, but never examined the student. The board's medical expert testified that the photos of the student's arm "looked like a burn to him, specifically an electrical burn. He said if high voltage is involved, one also needs to be concerned about underlying injury." Defense witness Dr. Patrick Johnston doubted the pictures show a second-degree burn, as that would have been "excruciating" and that he would have prescribed narcotic pain relievers in a similar case. Johnston further stated that, in his opinion, if it were second-degree burns, the "parents were negligent in not taking the child to a doctor."

The company that manufactured the device used by Freshwater has stated that it should not be used on human beings, and e-mailed written instructions to the investigators which state, “Never touch or come in contact with the high voltage output of this device, nor with any device it is energizing.” Freshwater defended his actions, stating he used an electrostatic generator to leave an "X", rather than a cross, on a student's arm as a demonstration, something he said he had done hundreds of times in the past, and that the process merely leaves a temporary red mark. Moreover, the only written instructions possessed by the schools had no such caution. Principal William White testified, "No, it does not [say anything about not touching people with the Tesla coil.]"

The board presented a second student who testified that he was burned by Freshwater, but did not complain, and said Freshwater told a group of students that "Catholics aren't Christians." The boy said the phrase stuck with him because he is a Catholic.

The defense presented many students, however, to contradict the board's student witnesses. One student, a 15-year-old former student of Freshwater who was in the same science class in which the Tesla coil incident occurred, stated, "A student would be lying if they said John [Freshwater] held someone's arm down on the overhead during the Tesla coil [experiment]." Seven more students testified that they didn't notice a Bible on Freshwater's desk, did not recall any case in which Freshwater referred to the Bible in class and did not remember Freshwater ever talking about intelligent design or creationism in class. The students said they did not see Freshwater hold anyone's arm down as the Tesla coil was applied; they also testified that they heard no one complain or cry out in pain due to the experience."

With regard to the allegations of Freshwater's incorrect teaching of evolution, a high school teacher testified that "she had to reteach science to freshmen after they received improper instruction from eighth-grade teacher John Freshwater." She explained, "If they had been taught evolution in a scientific manner, they would not have agreed that evolution is controversial." In June 2010 the evidence that was found in Freshwater's classroom in 2008, only a few months after he was suspended, was revealed to the public. Freshwater claimed that there were "date discrepancies" and that the evidence had been tampered with.

==== 2010 decision ====
In September 2010, while the hearing referee, R. Lee Shepherd, was deliberating, Dennis family attorney Douglas Mansfield filed an amicus brief with the referee, addressing Freshwater's claim that the Dennises are not credible witnesses. The brief states that claim is baseless, and adds, "the witnesses that testified in these proceedings confirmed that John Freshwater committed the wrongs the board alleged and did so over a lengthy period." He further noted that a federal court had determined that Freshwater is not credible.

On January 7, 2011, the referee submitted his report and non-binding recommendation to the Mount Vernon City School Board of Education. In his finding of fact regarding the Amended Resolution's allegations of injuring students with a Tesla coil, the referee wrote, “Once sworn testimony was presented, it [became] obvious that speculation and imagination had pushed reality aside. There was a plausible explanation for how and why the Tesla Coil had been used by John Freshwater.” He further noted that the matter had already been adjudicated by the administration in January 2008, and was not a proper subject for the Amended Resolution. He did not recommend this topic as a ground for contract termination, and this claim was not a basis for the Board's January 2011 resolution to terminate Freshwater's contract.

He went on, however, to recommend that Freshwater's contracts should be terminated, writing "he persisted in his attempts to make eighth grade science what he thought it should be — an examination of accepted scientific curriculum with the discerning eye of Christian doctrine." The next week, on January 10, 2011 the School Board voted 4-1 to terminate Freshwater. The process to terminate Freshwater's contract cost the School Board a total $902,765 over nearly three years. The expense caused debate about reforming the hearing process, with Republican politicians discussing the possibility of making changes.

==== Later unsuccessful appeals ====
Approximately one month after his firing, on February 8, 2011, Freshwater filed a 33-page complaint, which may also be considered an appeal, regarding the decision in the Knox County Court of Common Pleas, alleging board's actions breached the master contract, the hearing referee made errors, discrimination, creationism and intelligent design are not religions, a portion of the Ohio Revised Code provisions that deal with teacher terminations (OC 3319.16) is unconstitutional, and several other claims. In March, the School Board responded and asked United States District Court to hear the case. In April, the Court then returned the case to the Court of Common Pleas. The next week, the Rutherford Institute "announced that it will defend Freshwater in his bid to appeal the Mount Vernon City School District’s decision to fire him."

In July 2011, the Institute issued a press release that a "letter of admonishment" from Freshwater's disciplinary file was removed by Education Department because "Freshwater was not given the opportunity to defend himself before the admonishment was issued." A spokesperson for the Department said, that the letter and Freshwater's response were removed from the disciplinary file "while considering this matter."

On October 5, 2011, the Knox County court upheld the school board's decision to fire Freshwater for teaching creationism and religious doctrine in his middle-school classroom. In addition, Freshwater has to pay at least $100 in court costs.

In December 2011, Freshwater filed an appeal of the Knox County court decision in Ohio District Fifth District Court of Appeals with his attorney Kelly Hamilton in conjunction with the Rutherford Institute. In March 2012, the District Court of Appeals denied Freshwater's appeal, ruling "there was sufficient legal grounds for the school board to fire Freshwater" and ordered Freshwater to pay the costs of the appeal. In particular, the court ruled Freshwater "was represented by a competent attorney, he was permitted to fully explain his actions, he presented witnesses on his behalf, and he had a full opportunity to challenge the Board’s key witnesses" during the hearing.

In April 2012, Freshwater filed an appeal with the Supreme Court of Ohio, seeking the court to overturn decisions by the Court of Common Pleas and the Ohio Fifth District Court of Appeals. In July 2012 the Supreme Court of Ohio agreed to hear Freshwater's appeal. The Supreme Court of Ohio heard arguments on February 27, 2013. On November 20, 2013 the Supreme Court affirmed "the judgment of the court of appeals that upheld Freshwater’s termination."

In April 2014, Freshwater appealed the Ohio Supreme Court ruling to the US Supreme Court. On October 6, 2014, the US Supreme Court rejected the appeal without comment, letting the Ohio Supreme Court ruling stand.

=== Doe v. Mount Vernon Board of Education et al. ===
On June 13, 2008, the "Doe" (pseudonym) family filed Doe v. Mount Vernon Board of Education et al. in federal court against Freshwater and the Board of Education of the Mount Vernon City School District. The lawsuit alleged Freshwater had proselytized in class, displayed religious material (which was not for his personal use) in the classroom, and left a burn on the son's arm in the shape of a cross. It was later revealed that the plaintiffs were the family of Zachary Dennis.

Zachary's parents allegedly released a statement regarding Freshwater's claims saying, "We are religious people, but we were offended when Mr. Freshwater burned a cross onto the arm of our child." The statement continued, "We are Christians who practice our faith where it belongs, at church and in our home and, most importantly, outside the public classroom, where the law requires a separation of church and state."

In September 2008 WCMH-TV reported Freshwater filed a counterclaim saying he suffered "emotional distress, lost time from work and anxiety in his lawsuit. Plus, he wanted this case to be heard before a jury."

In August 2009, the Board of Education settled and the school board's insurance company "agreed to pay $115,000 toward the Dennises legal fees, $5,500 to Zachary Dennis and $1 each to Stephen and Jenifer Dennis." In addition, the board also agreed to provide training to administrators and teachers concerning religion and public schools.

In June 2010, Freshwater and his lawyer faced sanctions in court for not turning over documents related to the civil case. The judge also criticized Freshwater for taking a settlement offer marked "confidential" from the Dennises and reading it verbatim at a school board meeting. The judge issued a gag order due to Freshwater's actions and reprimanded Freshwater and Freshwater's attorney, R. Kelly Hamilton, for failing to turn over documents related to billing and evidence of religious items in Freshwater's class. The judge later upheld the sanctions previously issued, ordering Freshwater and Hamilton to pay plaintiff's attorney fees. In the order the judge found that “Freshwater's sworn testimony about the Tesla coil given on two separate occasions simply cannot both be true.” The Judge found "Based on Freshwater’s and Attorney Hamilton's less than forthcoming behavior, it would be a manifest injustice for Plaintiffs to be required to pay their attorneys for work necessitated only by Freshwater's and Hamilton's misconduct. Based on the foregoing, the Court denies the Motion for Reconsideration filed by Defendant John Freshwater and Attorney R. Kelly Hamilton."

On October 27, 2010 it was announced the case was settled and the family would receive $450,000 plus attorney fees. The settlement includes a $300,000 payment by Freshwater's insurer to Stephen and Jenifer Dennis to compensate them "for mental pain and other damages suffered" as well as a $150,000 annuity for their minor son, Zach Dennis and a $25,000 payment to Jones Day, the Dennises' attorney. As part of the settlement, "Dennis family has agreed to forego recovery of the sanctions awarded to them by the federal district judge presiding over the case." An attachment to the settlement from the family said they settled "to avoid having to put their son, Zach, and other Mount Vernon school students through the ordeal of what would likely have been a multi-week trial." John Freshwater "said he had no comment regarding the settlement."

On November 23, 2010 Licking County Probate Judge Robert Hoover approved the settlement agreement, making the case "officially settled." According to documents, settlement included "$475,000 to the Dennis family includes $25,000 for attorney fees, $150,000 each to Stephen and Jennifer, and $150,000 to be used for an annuity for Zachary."

=== Freshwater v. Mount Vernon Board of Education et al. ===
In June 2009, John and Nancy Freshwater filed Freshwater v. Mount Vernon Board of Education et al. in federal court, naming school board members, the superintendent, the middle school principal, and the investigators hired by the board as defendants. The suit sought $1 million in damages for charges including violation of Freshwater's first amendment right to free speech, discrimination of Freshwater's religion, and defamation. The suit wanted Freshwater reinstated as a science teacher at the school. Freshwater's attorney explained the timing of the lawsuit - while the administrative hearing was still in progress - was compelled by the impending expiration of the statute of limitations on the defamation claim.

On August 31, 2010 the Freshwaters' lawyer, Hamilton, was ordered to pay the Mount Vernon Board of Education's lawyer fees. The judge found that, “Plaintiffs have repeatedly failed to meet their discovery obligations in this case. The fact that their attorney regards himself as over-extended does not relieve either plaintiffs or their attorney of their obligations in this litigation — which was, after all, initiated by them.”

On October 14, 2010 John and Nancy Freshwater dropped their loss of consortium claim from the lawsuit. The case was still in the discovery phase and that same week the Board's attorneys issued "a large number of subpoenas to certain individuals, various organizations and businesses."

One week later on October 21, 2010, John and Nancy Freshwater dropped the lawsuit. Sarah Moore, an attorney for the defendants, said "We are not surprised and we think it is long overdue." In a statement released on October 22, Freshwater said "he dropped a federal lawsuit over his firing so facts of his case could be aired." Freshwater said he was offered a financial settlement, but defense attorney Moore said “There was no settlement offer to accept or reject. There was no money on the table for [Freshwater] to leave there. We were baffled when we received the e-mail from him and we can't even begin to speculate why he is saying what he is saying.”
