= Columbus Delano =

American politician and Secretary of Interior (1809–1896)

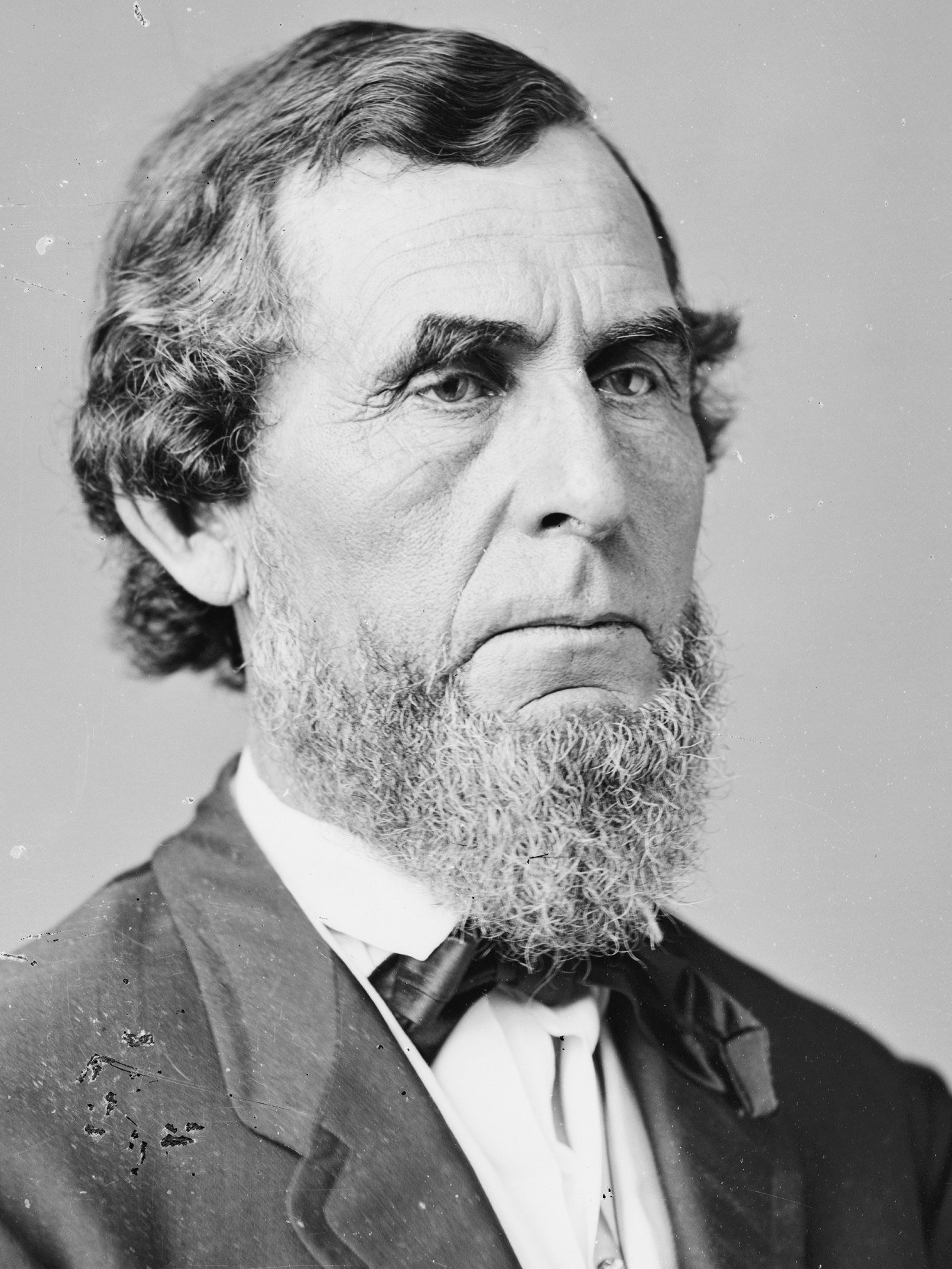

11th United States Secretary of the Interior
- In office November 1, 1870 – September 30, 1875
- President: Ulysses S. Grant
- Preceded by: Jacob Cox
- Succeeded by: Zachariah Chandler

5th Commissioner of Internal Revenue
- In office March 11, 1869 – October 31, 1870
- President: Ulysses S. Grant
- Preceded by: Edward A. Rollins
- Succeeded by: Alfred Pleasonton

Member of the U.S. House of Representatives from Ohio
- In office June 3, 1868 – March 3, 1869
- Preceded by: George W. Morgan
- Succeeded by: George W. Morgan
- Constituency: 13th district
- In office March 4, 1865 – March 3, 1867
- Preceded by: John O'Neill
- Succeeded by: George W. Morgan
- Constituency: 13th district
- In office March 4, 1845 – March 3, 1847
- Preceded by: Alfred P. Stone
- Succeeded by: Daniel Duncan
- Constituency: 10th district

Personal details
- Born: June 4, 1809 Shoreham, Vermont, U.S.
- Died: October 23, 1896 (aged 87) Mount Vernon, Ohio, U.S.
- Resting place: Mound View Cemetery, Mount Vernon, Ohio, U.S.
- Party: National Republican (before 1834); Whig (1834–1860); Republican (1860–1896)
- Spouse: Elizabeth Leavenworth (m. 1834)
- Children: 2
- Profession: Attorney

Columbus Delano (June 4, 1809 – October 23, 1896) was an American lawyer, rancher, banker, statesman, and a member of the prominent Delano family. Forced to live on his own at an early age, Delano struggled to become a self-made man. Delano was elected U.S. Congressman from Ohio, serving two full terms and one partial one. Prior to the American Civil War, Delano was a National Republican and then a Whig; as a Whig, he was identified with the faction of the party that opposed the spread of slavery into the Western territories. He became a Republican when the party was founded as the major anti-slavery party after the demise of the Whigs in the 1850s. During Reconstruction Delano advocated federal protection of African-Americans' civil rights, and argued that the former Confederate states should be administered by the federal government, but not as part of the United States until they met the requirements for readmission to the Union.

Delano served as President Ulysses S. Grant's Secretary of the Interior during a time of rapid Westward expansionism, and contended with conflicts between Native tribes and White American settlers. He was instrumental in the establishment of America's first national park, having supervised the first federally funded scientific expedition into Yellowstone in 1871, and becoming America's first national park overseer in 1872. In 1874, Delano requested that Congress protect Yellowstone through the creation of a federally funded administrative agency, the first Secretary of the Interior to request such preservation of a nationally important site.

Believing that the communal, collective, and nomadic lifestyles of Native American tribes led to war and impoverishment, Delano argued that the most humane Indian policy was to force tribes onto small reservations in the Indian Territory, ceding their land to the United States, and assimilating them into white culture. The goal was for Indian tribes to be independent of federal funding. To compel the Native tribes to move to reservations, Delano supported the slaughter to the near extinction of the vast buffalo herds outside of Yellowstone, which were essential to the maintenance of the Plains Indians' way of life.

Concerning government reform, Delano defied Grant's 1872 executive order to implement the first Civil Service Commission's recommendations. With the exception of Yellowstone, the spoils system and corruption permeated throughout the Interior Department during his tenure, and Grant requested Delano's resignation in 1875; he left office with his reputation damaged. Delano remained a spoils man at a time when reformer demands for a federal merit system were gaining support. Delano returned to Ohio to practice law, tend to his business interests, and raise livestock; he did not return to politics and died in 1896.

Delano was traditionally viewed as a 19th-century American "major mover and shaker." However, historians have strongly criticized Delano's weak oversight of the Interior, allowing rampant corruption, and for his treatment of Native Americans and endorsement of the Plains Indian bison slaughter. Yellowstone is considered Delano's greatest achievement, where bison and other wildlife were legally protected. He was viewed as an effective first administrator of America's first national park. While in office, Delano was an outspoken supporter of black American rights and an opponent of the Ku Klux Klan.

== Early life, education, and political career ==
Columbus Delano was born in Shoreham, Vermont, on June 4, 1809, the son of James Delano and Lucinda Bateman. The Delano family was of French ancestry; its first representative in America, Philip Delano, voyaged from Holland in 1621 on the Fortune, the sister ship of the Mayflower. Delano's father died in 1815 when Delano was six years old, and his family was put under the care of his uncle Luther Bateman. In 1817 the family moved to Mount Vernon in Knox County, Ohio, where Delano resided for the rest of his life. Delano was raised primarily by Luther Bateman, who died in 1817. After an elementary education Delano worked in a woolen mill in Lexington, Ohio, and at other manual laboring jobs, becoming largely self-sufficient while still a teenager.

After beginning self-directed legal studies, Delano formally trained with Mount Vernon attorney Hosmer Curtis from 1830 to 1831, and he attained admission to the bar in 1831. Delano became active in politics as a National Republican, and later as a Whig, and in 1834 he won election as Prosecuting Attorney for Knox County. He won reelection in 1836 and served two terms, 1835 to 1839. (Note: The Sacramento Daily Union said that Delano was elected Prosecuting Attorney in 1832.)

== Marriage and family ==
On July 14, 1834, Delano married Elizabeth Leavenworth of Mount Vernon, the daughter of M. Martin Leavenworth and Clara Sherman Leavenworth. Their children included daughter Elizabeth (1838–1904), who was the wife of Reverend John G. Ames of Washington, DC, and son John Sherman Delano (1841–1896), a businessman who also worked with his father at the Department of the Interior.

Delano and Ulysses S. Grant were distant cousins; they had great-great-grandparents in common.

== United States Representative (1845–1847) ==
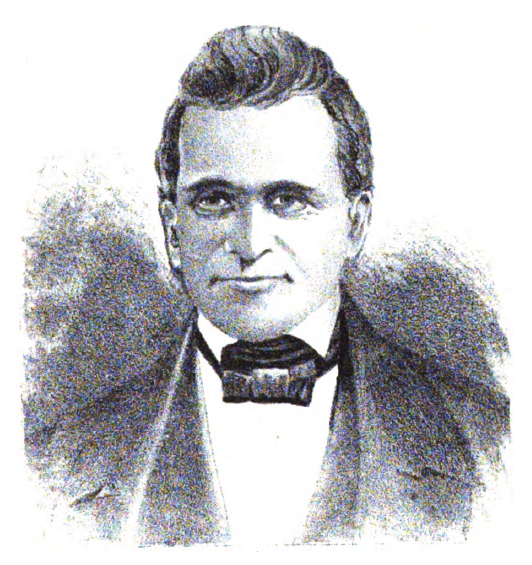
Seabury Ford defeated Delano by two votes to become Ohio's Whig candidate for governor in 1848.

In 1844, Delano was elected to the United States House of Representatives after appearing on the ballot as a replacement for Samuel White Jr., who had died after winning the Whig nomination. He went on to defeat Democrat Caleb J. McNulty by only 12 votes, 9,297 to 9,285.

=== Tenure ===
Delano served in the 29th Congress, (March 4, 1845—March 3, 1847), and was a member of the Committee on Invalid Pensions. He also gave a speech denouncing the Mexican–American War which earned him national recognition as an opponent of the conflict.

=== Campaign for governor ===
Delano did not run for reelection in 1846, instead campaigning for the 1848 Whig nomination for Governor of Ohio. He lost to Seabury Ford by two votes at the January 1848 party convention; Ford went on to defeat Democrat John B. Weller in a close general election, and served one term. Delano subsequently became involved in several business ventures; in 1850 he set up a successful Wall Street banking partnership, Delano, Dunlevy, & Company, which specialized in railroad bonds; it included a branch office in Cincinnati and operated for five years. In addition, Delano became a successful sheep rancher, and served as president of the National Association of Wool Growers and the Ohio Wool Growers Association. He was also active in other businesses; he was president of the Springfield, Mount Vernon & Pittsburgh Railroad, and an original incorporator of the First National Bank of Mount Vernon, of which he later became president.

== Republican Party and the Civil War ==
With the demise of the Whigs, Columbus Delano joined the new Republican Party. Delano was a delegate to the Chicago Convention in 1860, and he seconded the nomination of Abraham Lincoln for president. Delano actively campaigned for Lincoln, who won the presidency. The following year Delano served as Commissary-General of Ohio, on the staff of Governor William Dennison Jr., and aided in raising and equipping troops for the Union Army at the start of the American Civil War. In 1862 Delano was a candidate for the United States Senate seat held by Benjamin Wade. With Republicans in control of the Ohio General Assembly, winning their nomination was tantamount to election by the full legislature. Delano was nearly successful, losing the nomination to Wade by only two votes. In 1863, Delano served in the Ohio House of Representatives and played a notable role in shepherding the passage of legislation in support of the Union war effort. Delano served as Chairman of the Judicial Committee and settled the matter of the right of soldiers to vote. Delano served as Chairman of the Ohio delegation that attended the Baltimore Convention. Lincoln was successfully nominated for a second term of office.

== Reconstruction Era ==
=== Return to Congress ===
Delano was again elected to the U.S. House in 1864, and he served in the 39th Congress (March 4, 1865—March 3, 1867). During this term, Delano was chairman of the House Committee on Claims. Delano appeared to lose his bid for reelection in 1866, but successfully contested the election of George W. Morgan. After unseating Morgan, Delano served for the remainder of the 40th Congress, June 3, 1868—March 3, 1869. After the Civil War Delano supported Radical Reconstruction, believing that the South was in chaos and that federal involvement in the Southern states, including the army, was necessary to keep the peace. He did not run for reelection in 1868.

=== Reconstruction speech (1867) ===
In September 1867, Delano made a speech on Reconstruction in Eaton, Ohio, in which he said that President Andrew Johnson did not have the constitutional authority to establish civil government in the former Confederate states. Delano argued that Congress, not the president, "was required to establish civil governments in all the states." In Delano's view, Johnson and Southern Democrats, who had previously supported the Confederacy, were conspiring to overthrow Congress by undermining its authority to make laws concerning Southern Reconstruction. As proof, Delano cited Johnson's September 1866 Swing Around the Circle speech, in which Johnson said the national legislature was a "pretended Congress". In addition, Delano believed Johnson was conspiring to remove Ulysses S. Grant as head of the army because of Grant's support for Congressional Reconstruction. As a result, Delano advocated impeaching Johnson and removing him from office, and argued that Grant should be protected by Congress from any attempt by Johnson to remove him. Unknown to Delano, on August 11, 1867, Grant had agreed to accept Johnson's offer to serve as interim Secretary of War, while simultaneously remaining general of the army. Under the provisions of the Tenure of Office Act, the appointment would be temporary until the U.S. Senate returned to session in January 1868, and either ratified or prohibited Stanton's removal. Johnson and Grant agreed to Grant's temporary appointment despite explicitly admitting that they disagreed on Reconstruction policy.

=== Commissioner of Internal Revenue ===
Delano remained active in politics and supported Grant for president in 1868. When Grant became president in March 1869, he appointed Delano Commissioner of Internal Revenue; Delano served from March 11, 1869, to October 31, 1870. As commissioner, Delano tried with mixed success to collect federal revenue on alcohol and tobacco products manufactured in Indian Territory; these items could be produced for sale tax-free within the territory, but manufacturers routinely sold them in adjacent states without paying the taxes. He also proved unwilling or unable to cope with the frauds of the Whiskey Ring; despite having received warnings of corruption including bribery of federal officials and failure to pay taxes, Delano took little or no action. The department did attempt to prevent the illegal manufacture and sale of whiskey in other areas; on January 31, 1870, an Internal Revenue raid in Georgia captured 18 illicit whiskey stills and their operators. The Whiskey Ring was finally stopped in 1875 during Grant's second term by Secretary of the Treasury Benjamin Bristow. The ring leader, John McDonald was an acquaintance of President Grant and had requested from him a political appointment as superintending inspector of internal revenue in St. Louis. Grant then directed Delano to make the appointment. McDonald was convicted of fraud and theft and served 17 months in prison. In all, the investigation of the Whiskey Ring resulted in 110 convictions. Grant's private secretary, Orville E. Babcock was implicated, but acquitted at trial after Grant provided written testimony on his behalf. Additionally, Delano was cleared of involvement in another scandal in which Babcock was implicated, the Gold Ring, which was triggered when two New York financiers attempted to corner the gold market on September 24, 1869. Daniel Butterfield, the Assistant Treasurer of the United States, and Grant's brother in law Abel Corbin were also implicated; Butterfield was forced to resign in October. Delano's reputation for personal honesty was not in question, which was an asset when Grant needed to nominate a new Secretary of the Interior in 1870.

=== Secretary of the Interior ===
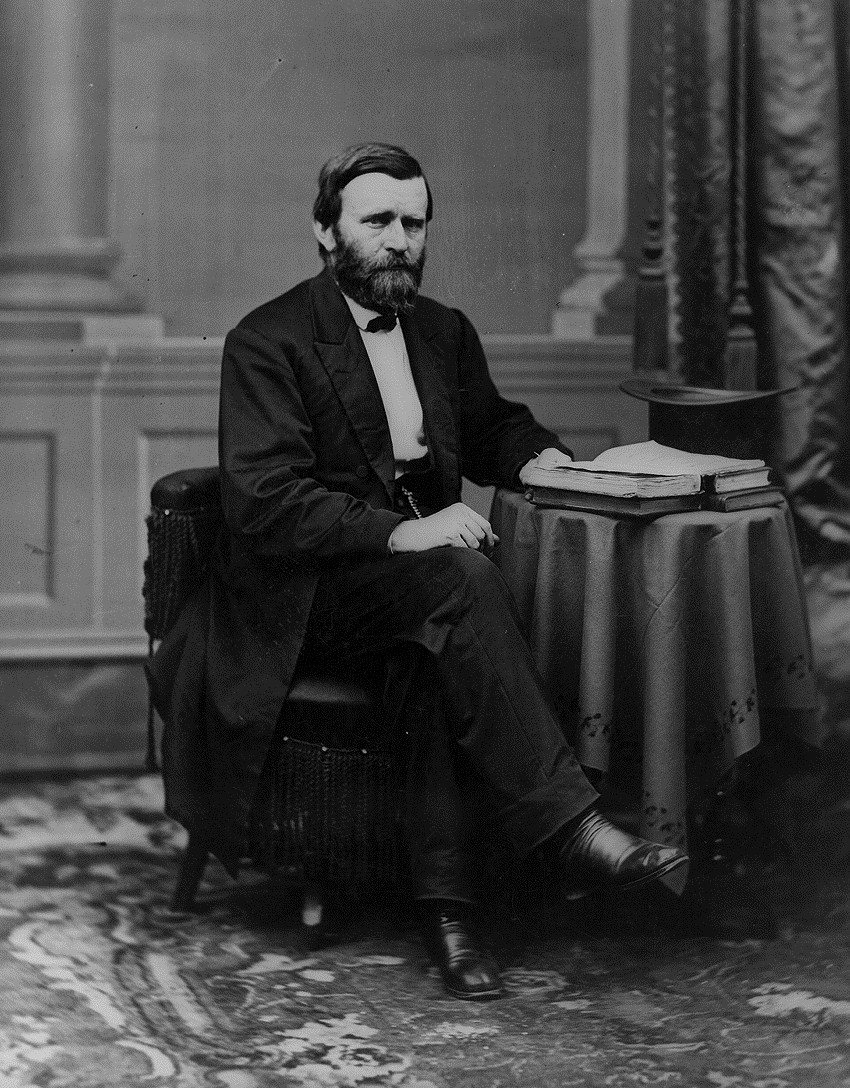
Ulysses S. Grant, c. 1870s

United States Attorney General Ebenezer R. Hoar and Secretary of the Interior Jacob D. Cox resigned in 1870 because of Grant's decision to overrule them on the issue of the McGarrahan Claims; speculator William McGarrahan claimed title to a tract of mining land in California, as did the New Idria Mining Company. Grant wanted no executive branch action taken, considering both claims to be fraudulent; Cox and Hoar disagreed and decided in favor of New Idria, which prompted Grant to request their resignations.

Grant appointed Delano to succeed Cox at the Interior Department; he served from November 1, 1870, until resigning on October 19, 1875. During Delano's tenure, the Interior Department was the largest bureaucracy in the federal government, including numerous patronage positions. Running the department required knowledge of dissimilar duties, and the ability to master complex details. During Delano's time as secretary, he faced several critical issues and his department was rapidly expanding; despite the challenges he served longer in the job than any other 19th-century incumbent. Delano aligned himself with Grant's private secretary Orville Babcock and Secretary of Navy George M. Robeson. Delano rejected the civil service reforms of his predecessor Cox and reverted the Interior to the spoils system.

==== Bison slaughter (1870s) ====
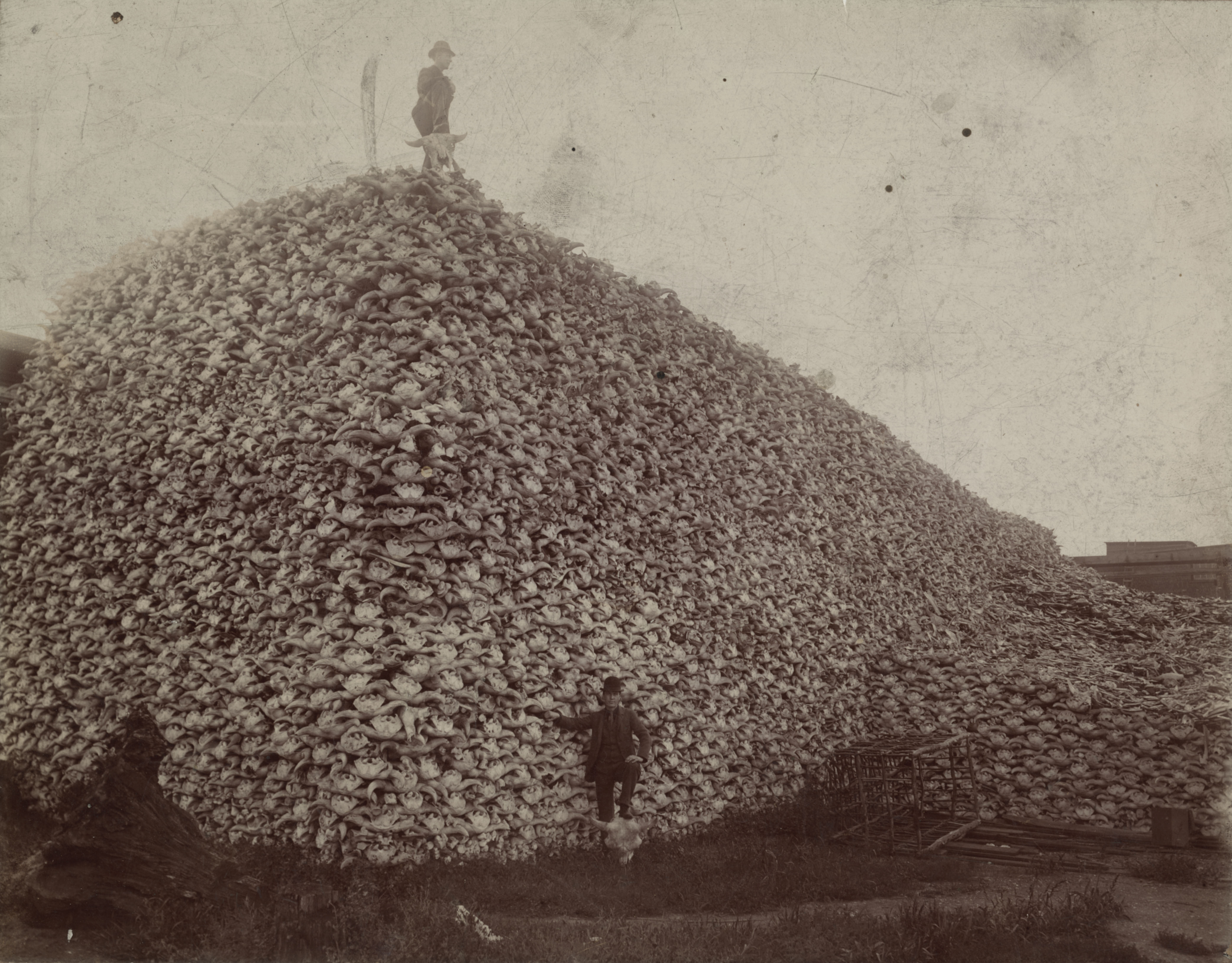
Bison skull pile, c. 1892

During the Civil War, Union generals practiced a "scorched earth" campaign against Confederate infrastructure that destroyed its vital food supplies, which aided in bringing about the Union's victory. During the late 1860s and early 1870s U.S. Army officers William T. Sherman, Richard Dodge, and Secretary of the Interior Delano adopted a similar strategy against Native Americans in the west, whose primary food supply was free-roaming bison. Dodge said in 1867, "Every buffalo dead is an Indian gone." Delano said in an 1872 annual report, "The rapid disappearance of the game [bison] from the former hunting-grounds must operate largely in favor of our efforts to confine the Indians to smaller areas, and compel them to abandon their nomadic customs."

Much of the destruction of bison was done by private, for-profit buffalo hunters; this policy allowed the slaughter of millions of bison on the American plains, forcing Indians to move to and remain on their reservations. The few free-roaming bison left in Yellowstone were protected from poaching by a federal law passed in 1872; during Delano's tenure, mounting criticism by the public forced Congress to pass legislation that would stop the bison slaughter on the plains. Grant vetoed the legislation in 1874, accepting that the bison slaughter was accomplishing the goal of pacifying the Indians. From 1872 to 1874 the Indians killed approximately 1,215,000 bison as part of providing for their food, shelter, and other basic needs; American hunters slaughtered an estimated 4,374,000 bison, reducing the population to the point that it could not reproduce normally and continue to sustain the Indians.

==== Apache massacre and peace (1871–1872) ====
On April 30, 1871, Tucson townspeople organized a militia, consisting of 6 Americans, 48 Mexicans and 94 Tohono O'odham Indians, which massacred 144 members of an Apache Indian settlement at Camp Grant, mostly women and children. Twenty-eight children were kidnapped by the militia and held as ransom for the Apache warriors, who were not present at the time of the massacre. The people of Tucson drew national attention by the scale of their activity, resulting in Eastern philanthropists and President Grant denouncing their actions. Arizona citizens, however, believed the killings were justified and claimed that Apache warriors had killed mail runners and settlers near Tucson. President Grant sent Major General George Crook to keep the peace in Arizona; many Apaches had joined the U.S. military for protection.

On November 10, 1871, Delano advocated to Grant that the Apaches be given new reservation land in Arizona and New Mexico, following the recommendation of Indian Peace Commissioner Vincent Colyer to find them a location where they could be protected from attacks by white settlers. Delano advocated that all Apaches be put on reservations including young men and warriors, who were forming raiding parties, rather than just their old men and women. Grant sent Major General Oliver Otis Howard to Arizona to help resolve the issue; Howard organized a peace conference with Apache leader Eskiminzin in May 1872 at Camp Grant. Howard also negotiated the release of six of the captive Apache children. In December 1872, the San Carlos Apache Indian Reservation, a permanent settlement, was established at the junction of the San Carlos and Gila Rivers, the location having been agreed upon by Howard and Eskiminzin. In October 1872, Howard also made a separate peace treaty with the Apache leader Cochise, who settled on the Chiricahua reservation.

==== Akerman feud (1871) ====
In June 1871 Grant's Attorney General Amos T. Akerman denied land and bond grants to the Union Pacific Railroad, a company connected to the Crédit Mobilier scandal. Ackerman's anti-railroad rulings were protested by railroad financiers Collis P. Huntington and Jay Gould. Akerman was also instrumental in prosecuting the Ku Klux Klan in the South and protecting African American civil rights. Railroad interests and African-American civil rights had been priorities for the Republican Party; on behalf of Huntington and Gould, Delano twice asked Akerman to change rulings that had gone against the Union Pacific, and both times Akerman refused. Delano then complained to Grant and suggested that Akerman should be removed. Grant agreed, and named former Oregon Senator George H. Williams as Akerman's replacement; Williams was seen as more favorable to railroad interests. On the issue of curtailing the Klan prosecutions, according to historian William S. McFeely, "[w]ith Akerman's departure on January 10, 1872, went any hope that the Republican party would develop as a national party of true racial equality."

==== Yellowstone (1871–1872) ====
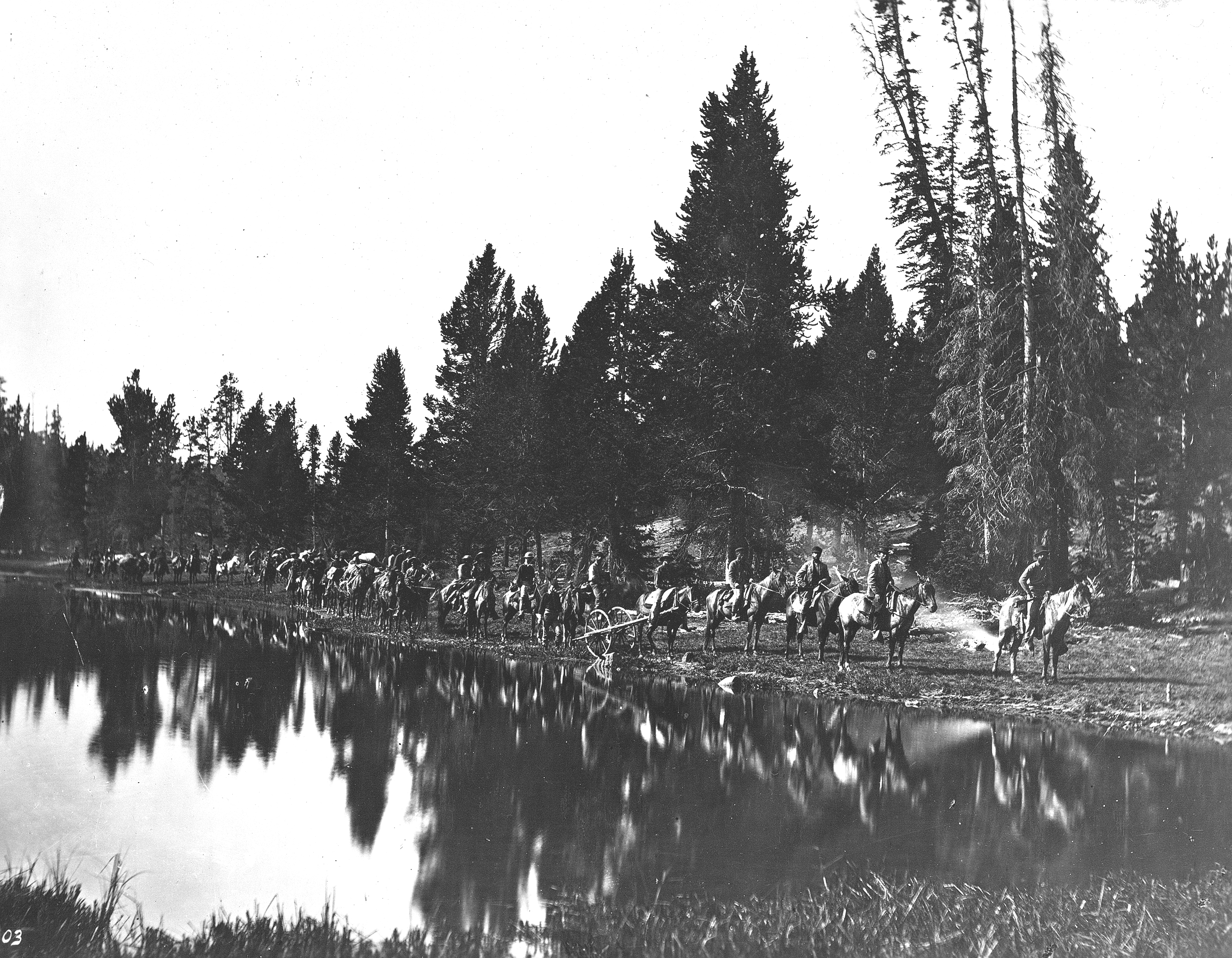
Hayden Geological Expedition, 1871

In 1871, Delano organized America's first federally funded scientific expedition into Yellowstone, which was headed by U.S. Geologist Ferdinand V. Hayden. Delano gave specific instructions for Hayden to make a geographical map of the area and to make astronomical and barometric observations. Delano stated that Hayden's expedition was directed to "...secure as much information as possible, both scientific and practical...give your attention to the geological, mineralogical, zoological, botanical, and agricultural resources of the country." Delano also ordered Hayden to gather information on Native American tribes who lived in the area. Hayden's expedition was outfitted by an extensive scientific team that included two botanists, a meteorologist, a zoologist, an ornithologist, a mineralogist, a topographer, an artist, a photographer, a physician, hunters, mule teams and ambulances, and a support staff.

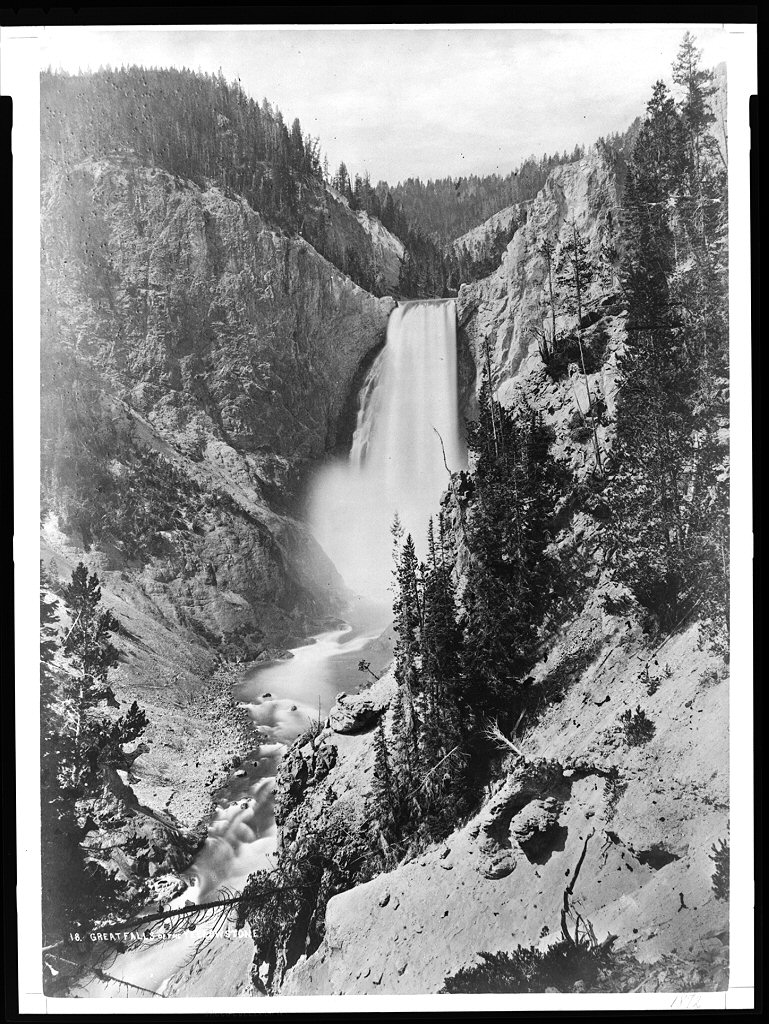
Lower Falls of the Yellowstone, 1871

On March 1, 1872 Ulysses S. Grant signed the Organic Act, incorporating Hayden's findings and discoveries and creating Yellowstone, the world's first national park. The law provided that the Secretary of the Interior exercise "exclusive control" over Yellowstone; As Delano was the incumbent, this made him the first overseer of the first national park in the world. The poaching of fish and wildlife, including bison, was forbidden, and Delano was authorized to preserve the "natural curiosities and wonders" found inside the park. Delano was now in charge of millions of acres of land, however, he was not provided any funding to care for it. Instead, he was given the power to grant 10-year leases in order to raise money to pay for maintaining the park. As soon as the park was created, Delano was inundated by requests for hotel concessions, and he also had to determine the control and use of existing facilities in the park's northern section.

Delano appointed N. P. Langford the first Supervisor of Yellowstone in 1872; Langford banned private toll roads and submitted a plan to build and maintain a park road system free to the public, but Congress refused to fund it. Congress also refused to give Langford a stipend, so he had to supplement his livelihood by working as a banker. In 1874 Lanford requested that Delano petition Congress for appropriations to protect the park from poachers, unlicensed privateers, and trespassers. Delano agreed and demanded Congress appropriate $100,000 to set up a federal park agency to administer and protect the park for the public, and also asked for an increase in the terms of the concession leases from 10 to 20 years. The proposal was turned down; it was not until April 1877, during the Rutherford B. Hayes administration, that Congress appropriated one-tenth of Delano's request, $10,000, (~$278,575 in 2025) without any federal protection agency for the park.

==== Defied Civil Service Executive order (1871–1874) ====
In March 1871, Grant signed into law Congressional legislation that established the United States Civil Service Commission, designed to create reform rules and to regulate and reduce corruption in the federal workforce. Implementation of the rules was left to the discretion of the President. Grant appointed New York reformer William Curtis to chair the commission. The Commission reported that appointments and promotions would be controlled by examiners, and each federal department would create a board of examiners, while political assessments would be abolished. Grant ordered the implementation of the rules to be effective on January 1, 1872. Grant dissolved the commission in 1874 after Congress refused to make the Commission rules permanent, and refused to provide permanent funding for the commission. Congressional interest in civil service reform would remain dormant until 1883.

Under Article 12 of Grant's executive order, Land Office and Pension agent applicants in the Department of Interior were to be approved by a board of examiners. Delano, however, betrayed Grant and defied the order. Grant made no response. The Interior Department's varied and diverse responsibilities increased at a rapid rate and became a source of numerous administrative problems. For the department head, controlling the bureaus and shaping policy was a daunting task; Delano argued that the complexities of the department made implementing civil service reform impractical. Under Delano's tenure, corruption permeated the whole department, including bogus agents in the Bureau of Indian Affairs and thieving clerks in the Patent Office. Delano ultimately resigned because of evidence that surveying contracts had been awarded to companies in which his son John, the chief clerk of the department, and Orvil (or Orville) Grant, the president's brother, had ownership interests; this was more or less permissible by the standards of the day, but to reform-minded individuals, including the editors of the New-York Tribune and other newspapers, it represented a conflict of interest and breach of the public trust.

==== Supported Ku Klux Klan prosecutions (1872) ====
To bolster the Reconstruction Acts and the Thirteenth, Fourteenth, and Fifteenth constitutional amendments, Grant signed in 1870 Congressional legislation that created the Justice Department. To fight the outrages in the South by the Ku Klux Klan, Grant signed several laws known as the Enforcement Acts in 1870 and 1871. In May 1871, Grant ordered federal troops to help U.S. Marshals in arresting Klansmen. Grant's second Attorney General Amos T. Akerman, a former Confederate soldier, knew of the outrages of the Klan and was zealous in prosecuting white Southerners who terrorized their black neighbors. That October, on Akerman's recommendation, Grant suspended habeas corpus in part of South Carolina and sent federal troops there to enforce the law. After prosecutions by Akerman and his replacement, George Henry Williams, the Klan's power collapsed; by 1872, elections in the South saw African Americans voting in record numbers.

In a campaign speech supporting President Grant's reelection bid in Raleigh, North Carolina, on July 24, 1872, Delano spoke out in favor of prosecutions of the Ku Klux Klan. Delano argued that the Congressional Reconstruction Acts had been passed to "rescue order and government out of the chaos and confusion" that came from the Civil War. This included the enfranchisement of African Americans, most of them former slaves, who had been set "forever free" as a result of the war. Delano stated that if freedom meant anything it was that African Americans "should stand equal before the law and have a voice in legislation." According to Delano, southerners who rejected Republican Reconstruction opted for a subversive war against African Americans and white Republicans, including the formation of the Ku Klux Klan. Delano said the Ku Klux Klan had in fourteen North Carolina counties killed 18 people and cruelly whipped 315 Republicans who had done nothing wrong. Delano said that evidence presented in prosecuting Klan members in the federal courts proved the "barbarity and treason" of the Ku Klux Klan. Grant ended up winning North Carolina and many other Southern states.

==== Defined Indian policy (1873) ====
In 1873, Delano formally defined the methods to be used in attaining the goals of Grant's policy toward the Native Americans. Grant's ultimate goal was to convert the Indians to Christianity and assimilate them into the white culture in order to prepare them for full U.S. Citizenship; these fundamental principles continued to influence Indian Peace policy for the rest of the 19th Century. According to Delano, relocating the Indians to reservations was of primary importance, since this would supposedly protect them from the violence of white settlers as whites moved onto lands previously held by Native Americans. In addition, Christian organizations and missionaries operating on these reservations could "civilize" the Native Americans, in line with the widespread belief (including Delano's) that allowing the Indians to continue to practice their own culture would lead to their destruction. In Delano's view, his actions would accomplish Grant's goal by facilitating Indian assimilation into white culture.

==== Black Hills takeover (1875) ====
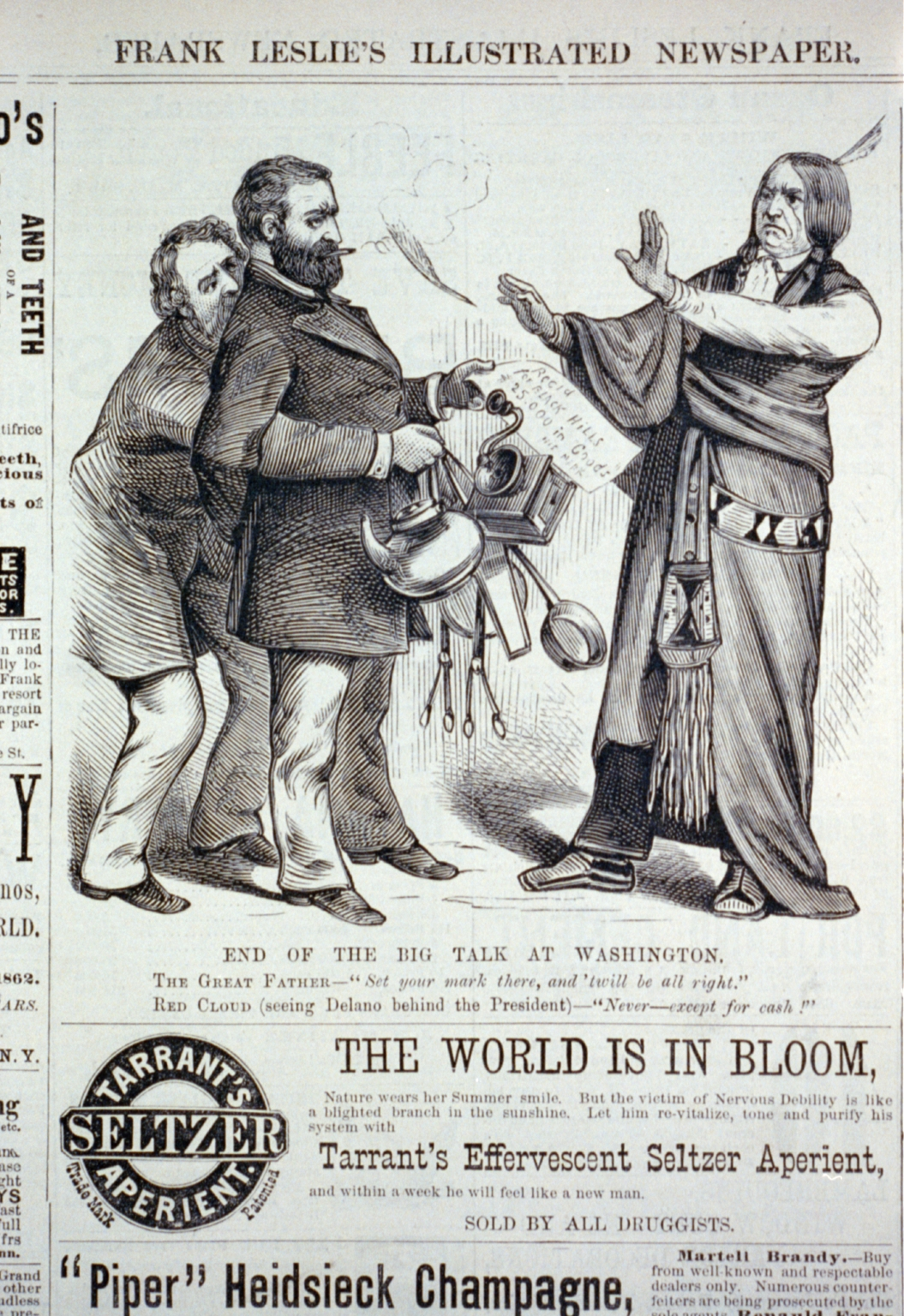
A Frank Leslie's Illustrated Newspaper showing Delano pretending to be Grant's arms, while offering kitchen utensils and a receipt for $25,000 to Red Cloud in exchange for the Black Hills, an offer Red Cloud refuses

Under the 1868 Treaty of Fort Laramie, the Oglala Sioux had been given a huge reservation including the Black Hills in what is now South Dakota. The Black Hills were the site of Sioux sacred religious rituals and spiritual ceremonies. (Note: Indians at this time did not have citizenship; rather, they were wards of the state (1871 Act), and their religion was not protected under the First Amendment. Indians were given citizenship in 1924.) Following the Panic of 1873 the country was desperate for new wealth. In 1874 rumors spread of gold being discovered in the Black Hills by George Custer's recent expedition. Grant sent the expedition, hoping to find gold in order to support his species currency policy; Delano opposed the move, believing travel through and eventual occupation of hunting grounds violated the Treaty of Fort Laramie and could lead to an Indian war. Delano told Grant that a "general war with the Sioux would be deplorable. It would undo the good already accomplished by our efforts for peaceable relations." Whites immediately flocked to the area in search of gold; in 1875, Congress appropriated $25,000 (~$666,219 in 2025) for the purchase of the Black Hills, hoping that a cash payment would assuage the Sioux and prevent war.

In mid-May 1875, Red Cloud, Chief of the Oglala Lakota (Sioux), and other Indian tribal leaders were brought to Washington D.C. to negotiate the sale of the Black Hills. The Sioux believed the amount offered by Congress was too low; recognizing that they would eventually lose the Black Hills, Red Cloud decided to negotiate and told Delano they would sign away the Black Hills if $25,000 in cash was first drawn from the Treasury Department, to ensure that the Sioux would be paid. Delano had no intention of giving Red Cloud cash, but rather a receipt for $25,000 from the Treasury and additional presents purchased at a later date and distributed to members of the tribe. Red Cloud insisted that he wanted the $25,000 in cash at the signing, which would be taken home and divided among the members of the tribe.

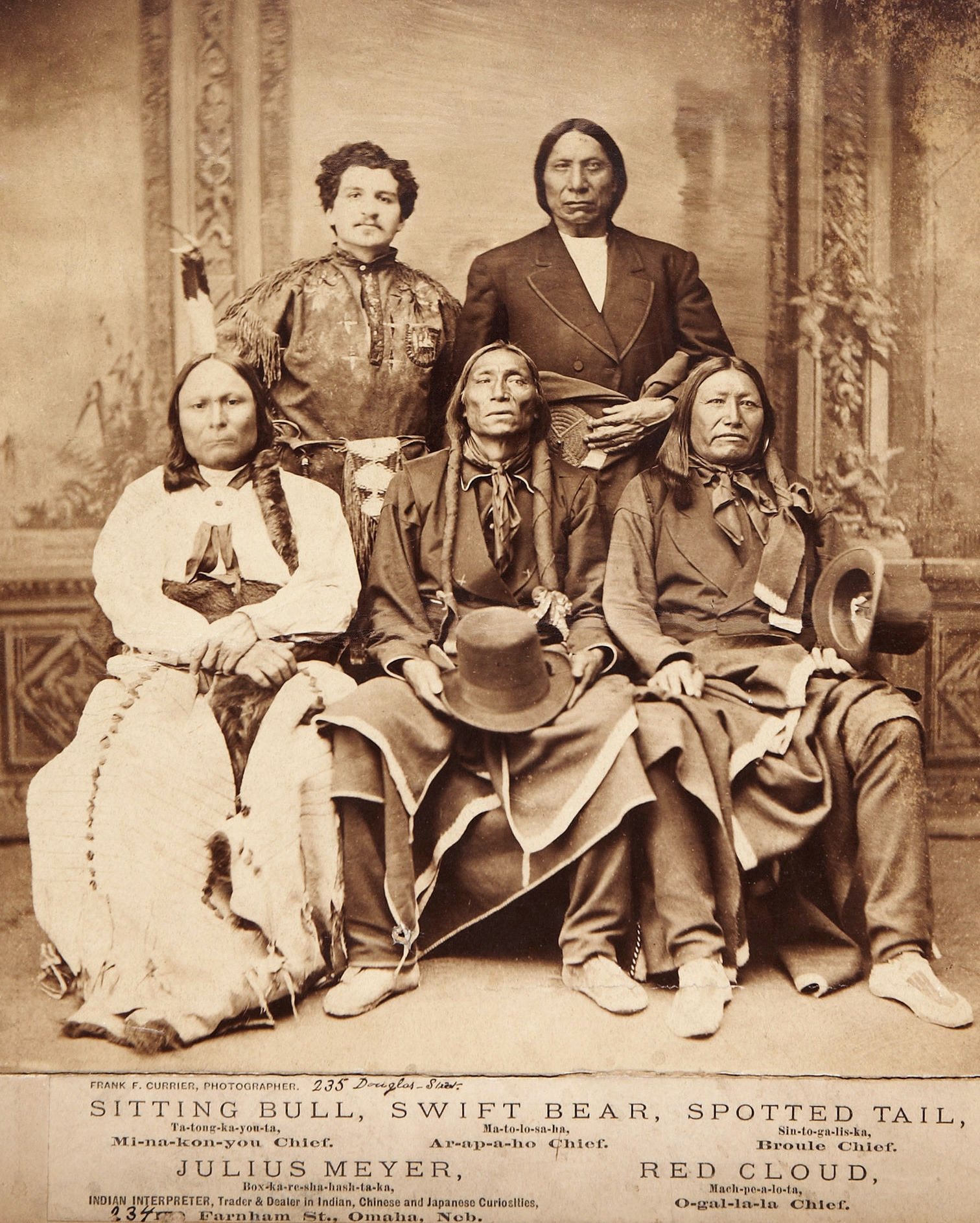
Red Cloud and his party travelling to Washington, D.C. to negotiate selling the Black Hills, May 1875

Delano warned Grant that a war would likely break out if negotiations were not successful. When negotiations broke down, Grant was brought into the process to bargain directly with Red Cloud. Grant told Red Cloud that the Black Hills had no buffalo, so it would benefit the Indians to accept payment because they would at least receive something of value in consideration for signing away valueless hunting rights. He also informed Red Cloud that whites were going to take over the Black Hills anyway, so it would be best not to leave empty-handed. Concerned that they would not be paid if they signed an agreement first, Red Cloud asked Grant to withdraw the money from the Treasury and hold it until after the signing. Grant refused and walked out, telling Red Cloud he had to sign over the Black Hills before any payment was made. On June 4, Delano offered Red Cloud an additional $25,000 in appropriations, but Red Cloud refused.

With Red Cloud's refusal, Delano reluctantly let the Indians take the unsigned agreement back to their tribal agencies for further discussion among the members of the tribe, with final terms and signatures to be negotiated later by an appointed commission. The failure of the Washington, D.C. negotiations to produce an agreement was lampooned in the June 19 edition of Frank Leslie's Illustrated Newspaper. Upon their return to Sioux country, Red Cloud and other Lakota leaders finally signed away their hunting rights to the Black Hills under Article 11 of the Treaty of Fort Laramie in exchange for the original $25,000 Congressional appropriation. Another group of Sioux chiefs, including Sitting Bull and Crazy Horse, challenged Red Cloud's authority and started the armed resistance about which Delano had warned Grant. This challenge to Red Cloud's authority combined with Lakota unhappiness over white encroachment into the Black Hills resulted in the Great Sioux War, which started in February 1876.

==== Resignation and corruption (1875) ====
In 1875, Delano's reputation for personal honesty came under increasing scrutiny as revelations of corruption in the Grant administration continued to be the subject of investigations and media revelations. Although Delano himself was not known to be personally corrupt, his tenure was shadowed by controversy, while fraud prevailed in his Interior Department. There were accusations of an "Indian Ring" and corrupt agents who exploited Native American people. Westerners unhappy with Delano's rulings on land grants and other issues accused Delano's son John, an employee of the Interior Department, of corruption, bribery, and fraud in the Wyoming Territory.

===== Surveyor General Ring =====
The New-York Tribune reported that John Delano was profiteering through Interior's Office of the Surveyor-General by accepting partnerships in Wyoming surveying contracts without having been trained in surveying or map-making, and without providing any meaningful contribution to the fulfillment of the contracts; the obvious implication was John Delano had taken extortion money from illicit contract agreements. In March 1875, the former chief clerk of the Surveyor's Office, L. C. Stevens, wrote to Benjamin Bristow, Grant's Secretary of the Treasury, stating that Surveyor General Silas Reed had made several corrupt contracts which financially benefited John Delano. Stevens also said both Reed and John Delano had blackmailed five deputy surveyors for $5,000. According to Stevens, Reed and Delano had coerced the deputy surveyors to pay John Delano before he would release the Interior Department warrants for land the deputy surveyors had sold to prospective settlers. Governor Edward M. McCook of the Colorado Territory, claimed that John Delano had accepted a $1,200 bribe from a Colorado banker, Jerome B. Chaffee, to secure land patents from the Department of Interior. More damaging was Stevens' charge that Columbus Delano knew and approved of what Reed had done for John Delano.

In addition to Delano's son, Grant's brother Orvil was paid for surveying services in the Wyoming Territory, although Orvil did no work. The chief clerk of the Cheyenne branch of the federal Surveying Office testified before Congress concerning Orvil. When asked whether Orvil did any work in the Wyoming Territory, the chief clerk said, "No, sir, I do not think he was ever in the territory."

===== Indian Ring =====
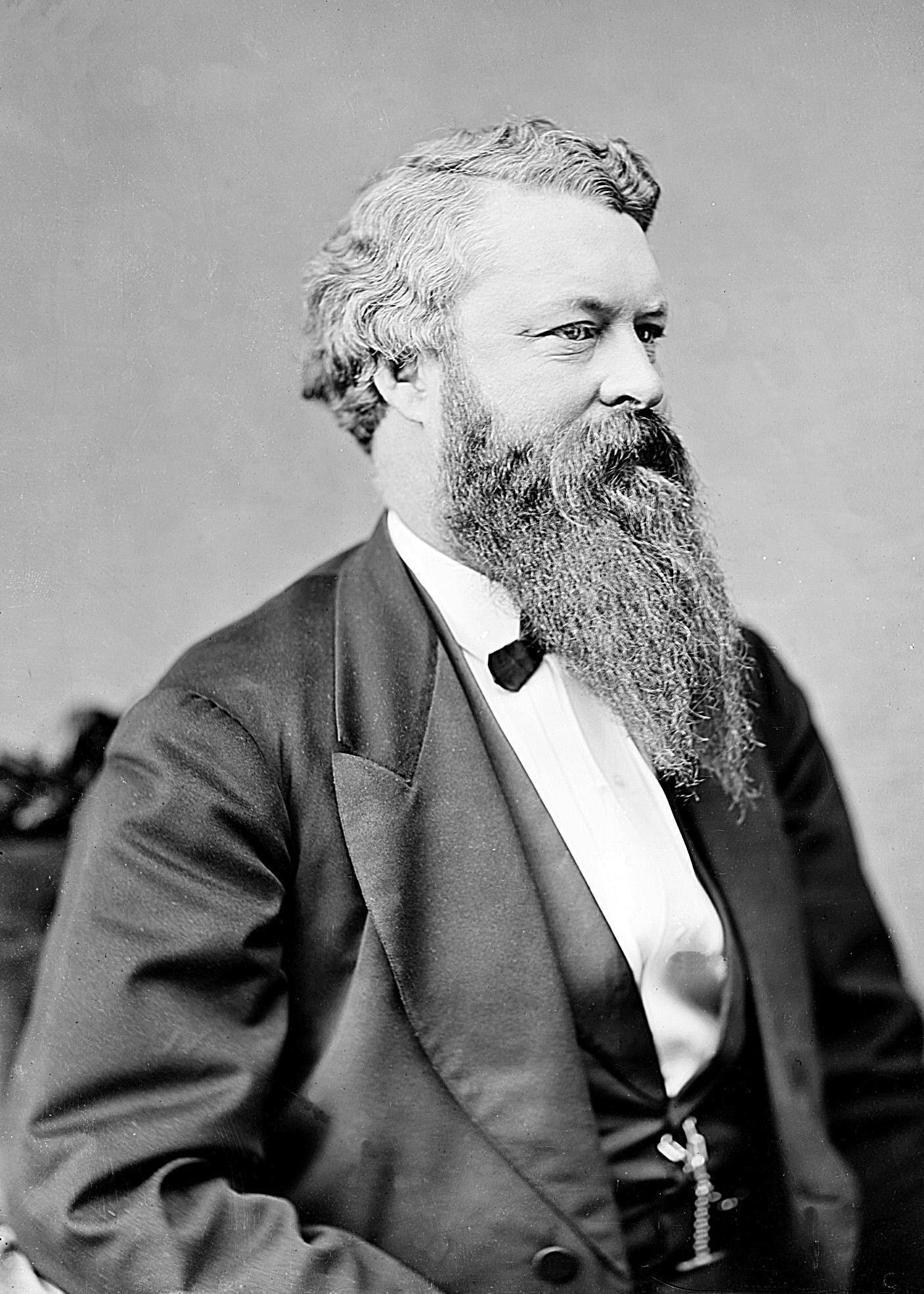
William W. Belknap, boss of the Indian Ring and secretary of war

In July 1875, Delano was rumored to know that Orvil Grant, the president's brother, had received Indian trading posts, that were a corrupt source of lucrative kickbacks, from the sutler, at the expense of the Indians and soldiers. The higher the sale price on goods, that the Indians and soldiers would pay, the higher the profits. Even the sale of rifles to hostile Indian tribes was allowed, to make more money. The profits were split and sent to the other sutler partners.

Delano was rumored to have threatened Grant at Long Branch that he would expose Orvil to the public when Delano's resignation was enforced. He told Grant that he would quietly leave office after Congressional Indian fraud investigations were complete. In February 1876, the New York Herald reported that Orvil made money in the Sioux country by "starving the squaws and children." Orvil testified before Congress that Grant had influenced the War Department to get him traderships. Orvil received rights to operate four trading posts, then set up "partners" who kicked back half their profits to Orvil. Though Orvil claimed Grant had not known of the kickbacks, he expressed no remorse for his corruption, and his testimony left Grant embarrassed.

The kingpin of this Indian Ring was not Delano, but Secretary of War William W. Belknap, who was given legal authority by Congress in 1870 to appoint sutlers to traderships at Army posts near Indian reservations, which were controlled by Interior. Belknap, who had awarded Orvil Grant the four traderships, took advantage of the law to personally profit by arranging an illicit partnership at Fort Sill between his wife Carrie, Caleb P. Marsh, and sutler John S. Evans. After Carrie's death, Belknap married her sister Amanda, who continued the illicit tradership arrangement. Belknap's household received as much as $20,000 in illegal profits (nearly $500,000 in 2021), which Belknap needed in order to finance the lavish Washington D.C. entertainment lifestyle expected of cabinet members and other prominent political figures.

Aware that the U.S. House was investigating him, on March 2, 1876, Belknap visited Grant and immediately resigned. The House continued its inquiry and found him guilty of five articles of impeachment. Grant's attorney general placed Belknap under house arrest during his U.S. Senate trial. Though most senators believed the evidence of Belknap's corruption, enough believed they lacked the jurisdiction to punish Belknap because he was no longer in office to acquit him. Despite escaping conviction, Belknap's reputation was so marred that he never returned to political office.

===== Resignation =====
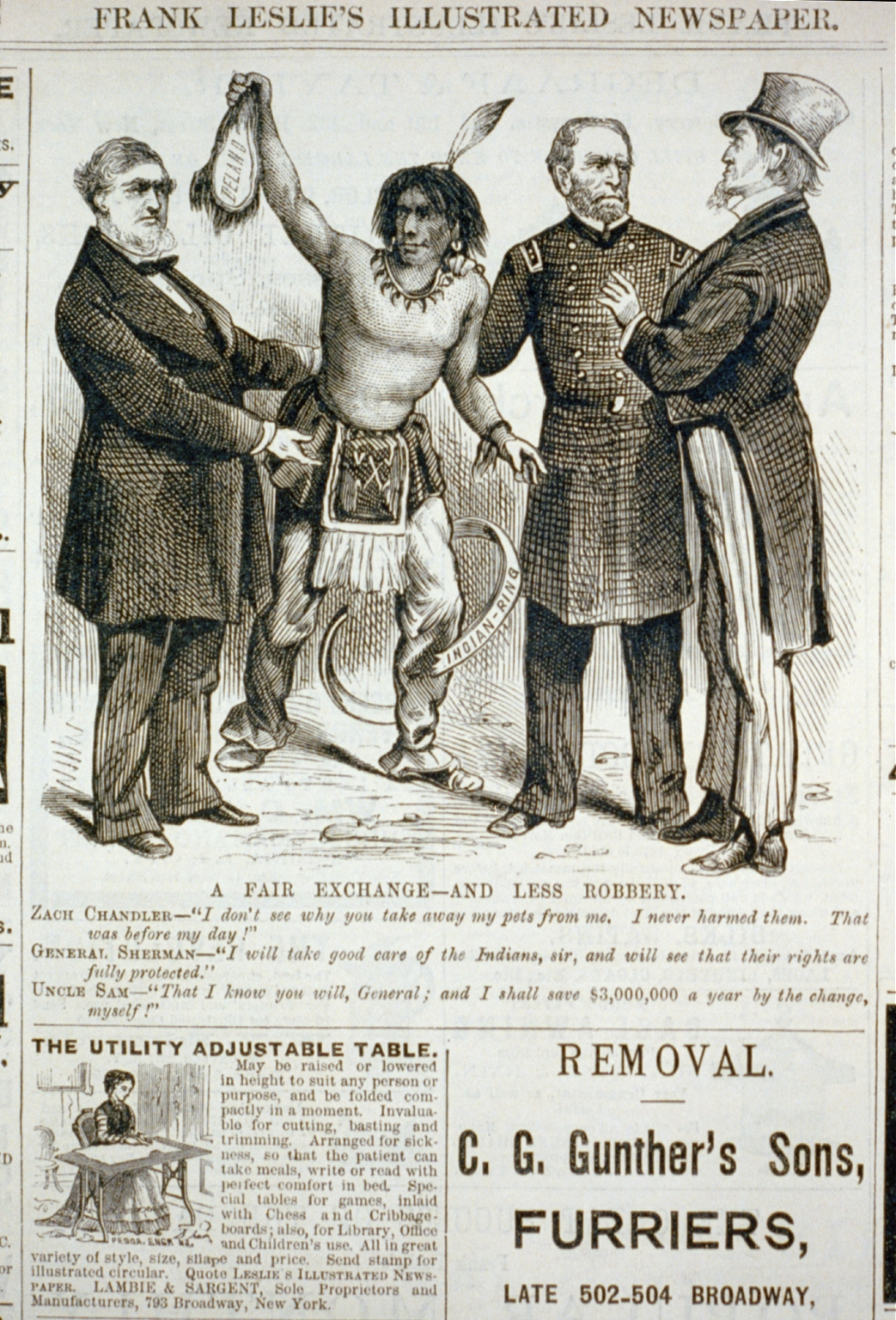
Delano's reputation, after his resignation, was lambasted by the press. An Indian holds Delano's scalp, May 13, 1876.

Both Bristow and Secretary of State Hamilton Fish demanded that Grant fire Delano. Grant declined, telling Fish, "If Delano were now to resign, it would be retreating under fire and be accepted as an admission of the charges." The controversy did not abate; by mid-August, it became clear that Delano could not remain in office; Delano offered his resignation and Grant accepted, but Grant did not make it public. Grant finally announced his acceptance of Delano's resignation on October 19, 1875, after Bristow threatened to resign if Delano was not replaced. Grant replaced Delano with Zachariah Chandler, who quickly initiated civil service and other reforms in the Department of the Interior. Delano's administration was investigated by Congress, Chandler, and a special presidential commission; his personal conduct was exonerated, but his reputation as an honest, capable administrator was damaged, and Delano never again ran for office or served in an appointed one. In April 1876, The Committee on the Expenditures in the Interior Department confirmed that Reed had set up an illicit slush fund for John Delano's financial benefit and that Delano thanked Reed while also telling him "to be careful to do nothing that would have the semblance of wrong."

===== Delano's defense =====
On September 26, 1875, Delano submitted to Grant a letter defending his tenure at the Department of the Interior; in essence, he argued that the size and complexity of his department made it difficult to manage effectively. Delano stated that he had resigned because he intended to return to his business and domestic concerns in Ohio. He indicated that his duties as Secretary of the Interior were "laborious, difficult, and delicate" because he was required to supervise five disparate bureaus or offices: United States General Land Office; Indian; Pensions; Patent; and Education, in addition to "a mass of miscellaneous business unknown to any except those connected to the public service."

Delano also reminded Grant that the Land Office dealt with complex railroad land grants, as well as issues resolving land titles in California, Arizona and New Mexico, because those areas had previously been under Spain's and then Mexico's jurisdiction. In addition, the Indian Bureau dealt with many "intricate, delicate, and vexatious questions" growing out of previous Indian treaties. Delano further informed Grant that when he had to decide issues between competing claimants, those he ruled against often gave false and misleading statements rather than accept their loss, which was to Delano's detriment. Delano concluded by claiming a successful tenure, informing Grant that the Interior Department "has never been in a more prosperous or better condition than it now is."

===== Chandler reforms =====
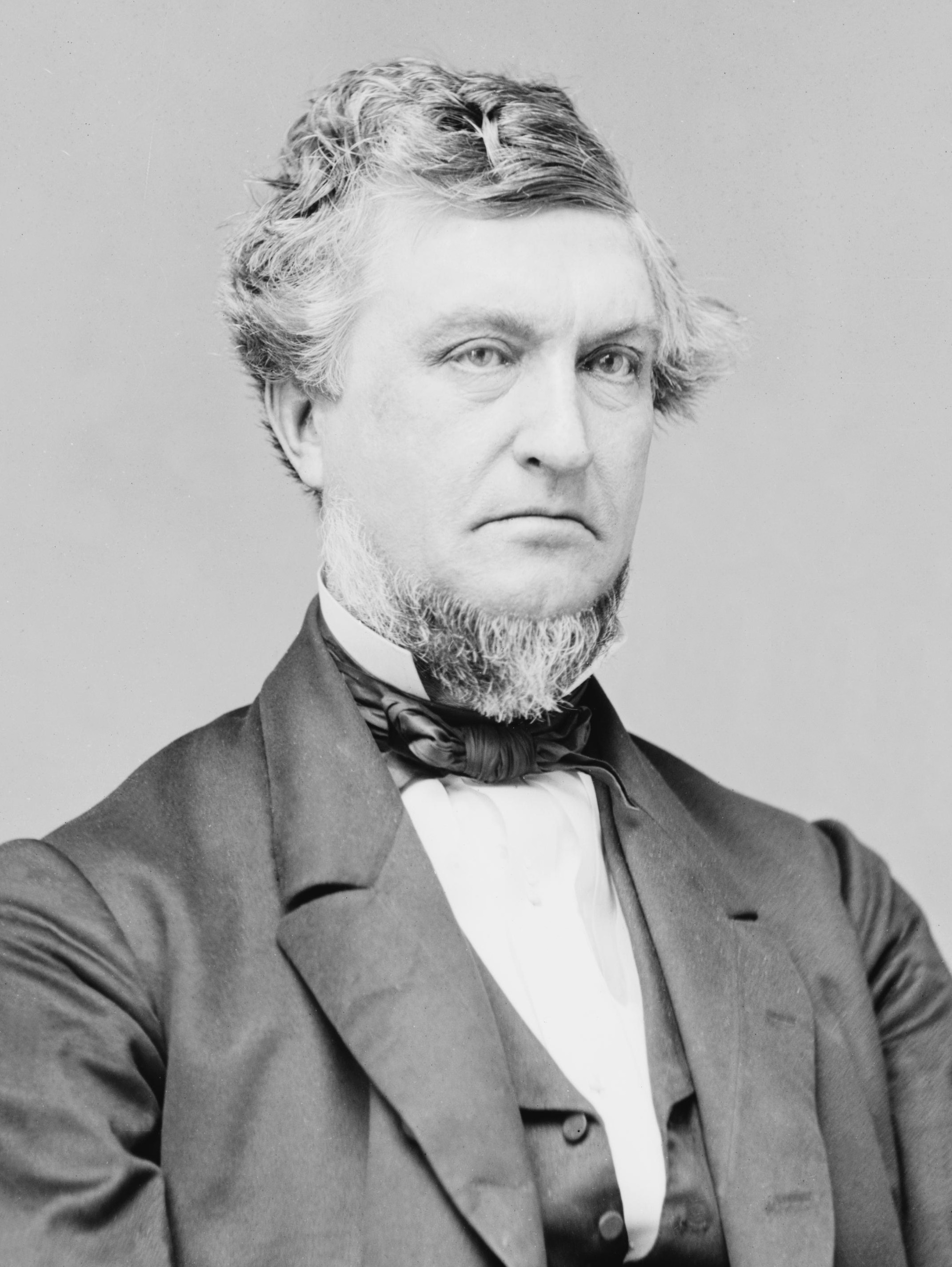
Zachariah Chandler

Delano's successor, Zachariah Chandler, did not complain about his departmental duties and immediately investigated allegations of corruption. Chandler found things differently than Delano's explanations to Grant and decided the department needed major reforming. During his first month in office, he fired all the clerks in one room of the Patent Office; he noted that every desk was vacant, and concluded that the employees were either involved in corruption or lacked the integrity to reform the department. Almost twenty employees were found to be entirely fictitious; they had been created by a profiteering ring to defraud the government by falsely receiving pay for work that was not performed. Chandler also fired unqualified clerks who profiteered by hiring out their work to lower-paid replacements and pocketing the salary difference.

In addition, Chandler simplified Patent Office rules, making patents easier to obtain and reducing the cost for applicants. In December 1875, Chandler banned persons known as "Indian Attorneys", whose claims to represent Native Americans in Washington were questionable. He found the Bureau of Indian Affairs to be the most corrupt and replaced its commissioner and chief clerk. In addition to Indian Affairs, Chandler also investigated the Pension Bureau. This review resulted in the identification and removal of numerous fraudulent pensions, which saved the federal government hundreds of thousands of dollars. Chandler also revoked as many as 800 fraudulent land grants that had been approved during Delano's tenure.

== Later life and career ==
On his resignation from Grant's cabinet, Delano returned to Mount Vernon where for the next twenty years he served as president of the First National Bank of Mount Vernon. He was a longtime trustee of Kenyon College, which awarded him the honorary degree of LL.D.; among his charitable and civic donations was his endowment of Kenyon's Delano Hall; this building was in use until it was destroyed by a fire in 1906. His "Lakehome" mansion, built in 1871 at the outskirts of Mount Vernon, is now part of Mount Vernon Nazarene University.

On April 3, 1880, John W. Wright, a judge from Indiana, was convicted at trial of having assaulted Delano on a Washington, D.C. street corner on October 12, 1877. Wright, who had been an Indian Agent in the Interior Department while Delano was secretary, had been convicted of fraud and blamed Delano. On the day of the assault he was in the company of Walter H. Smith, formerly solicitor of the Department of the Interior; Wright was accused of provoking a fight by questioning Delano's honesty as Secretary of the Interior and then striking Delano with his walking stick. Wright claimed that Delano had been verbally harassing him and that he then felt compelled to defend himself. Delano did not sustain serious injuries; Wright's defense was weakened by witness testimony that after the assault, he claimed credit for it, and stated that he would have continued if passers-by had not intervened. Wright was sentenced to 30 days in jail and fined $1,000. On April 8, 1880, President Rutherford B. Hayes pardoned Wright, with his release from custody conditional upon the payment of the fine.

On December 3, 1889, Delano was elected president of the National Wool Growers Association, a lobbying group organized to advocate for tariff protection of the national wool industry. The association had been formed in 1865, and became more active in the 1880s as a response to the decline in domestic wool production; wool growers faced increasing overseas competition and had gone from 50 million sheep producing wool in 1883 to 40 million in 1888.

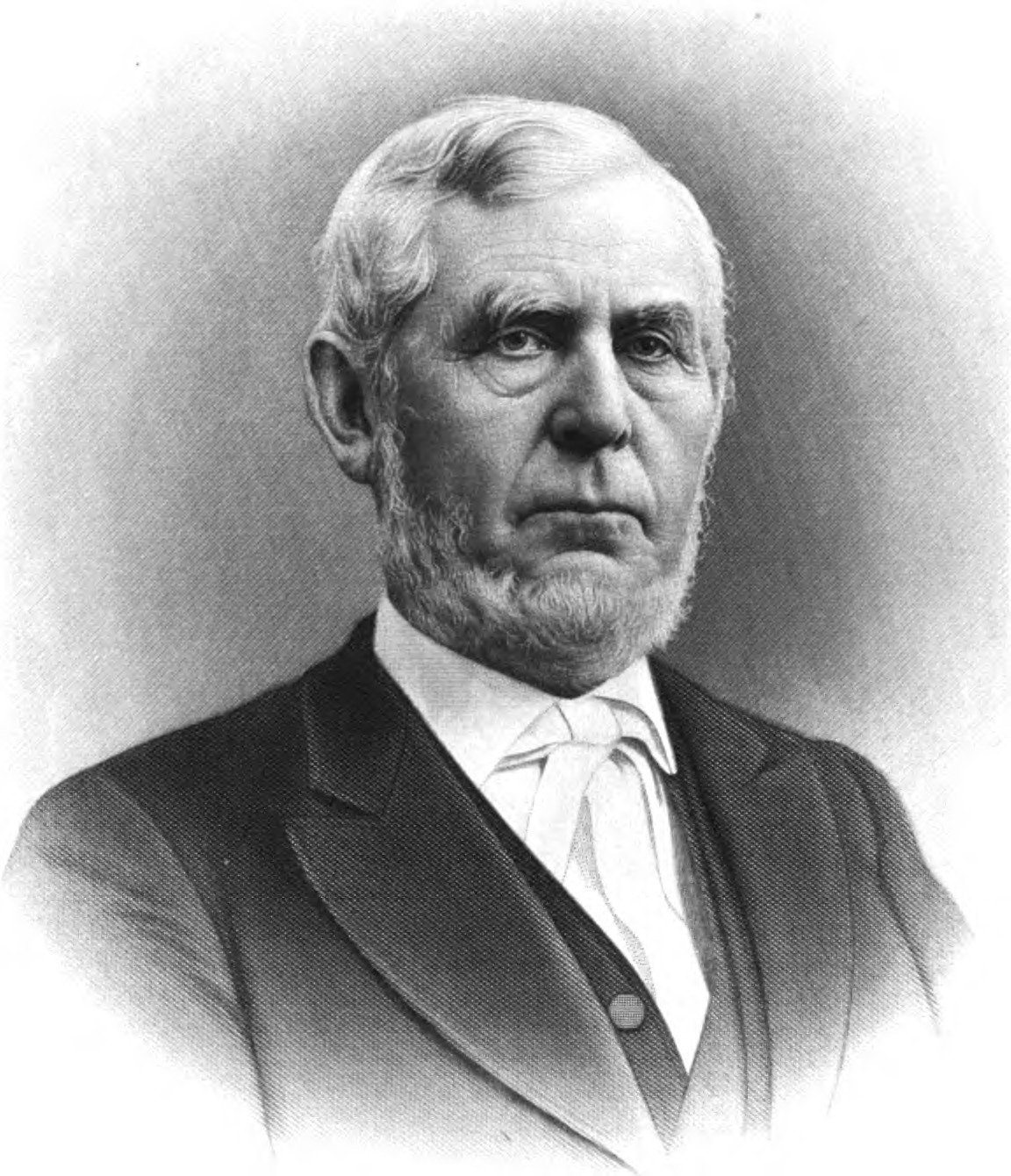
Delano, elder statesman

== Death ==
Delano died on October 23, 1896; he was interred at Mount Vernon's Mound View Cemetery, Lot 42, Section 16, Grave 4. Delano's death was sudden and unexpected, and took place at his "Lakehome" residence near Mount Vernon, at 11:00 AM. Delano's wife had fallen and broken her hip on October 20, an accident unrelated to Delano's death. She died in August 1897.

== Historical legacy ==
Delano's career prior to becoming Secretary of the Interior was not known for any scandals, nor has he been implicated in the Crédit Mobilier scandal. Historians, however, are critical of Delano's overall tenure as Secretary of the Interior, especially for his loose anti-reform administrative style and for allowing corruption to permeate the department. As such, Delano was at odds with many of Grant's other Cabinet members, including Secretary of State Hamilton Fish, Secretary of Treasury Benjamin Bristow, and Attorney General Amos T. Akerman. The corruption under Delano in the Bureau of Indian Affairs, an agency within the Interior Department, in particular eventually led to the end of the agency being part of the political appointee and career civil servant systems and pushed it toward bureaucratization. Delano later defended his reputation by saying that the Interior Department was difficult to manage due to its expanding size and its many offices with disparate functions.

=== Indian advancement ===
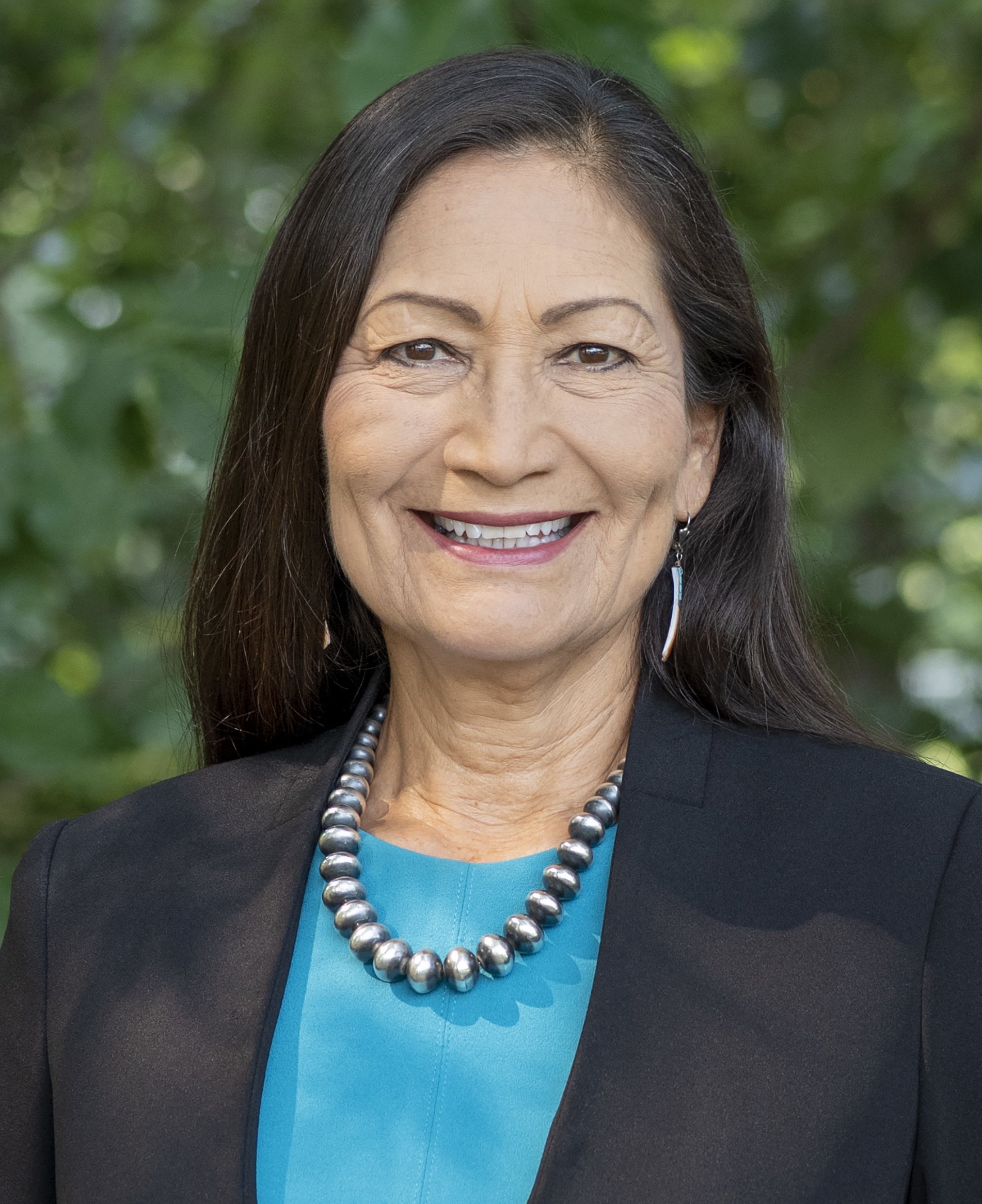
Deb Haaland of Laguna Pueblo, the 54th secretary of the interior

In March 1869, President Grant appointed Ely S. Parker, a Seneca Indian, to commissioner of Indian Affairs serving under both Interior secretaries Cox and Delano. Although there was resistance to his appointment, the Senate confirmed Parker could legally hold office, and he was confirmed by the Senate. During Parker's tenure, lasting until August 1871, Indian wars decreased significantly from 101 in 1869 to 58 in 1870.

In 2021, some 145 years after Delano left office in 1875, the position of secretary of the interior was first filled by a Native American. On December 17, 2020, president-elect Joe Biden announced that he would nominate Deb Haaland to serve as secretary of the interior. She was confirmed by the Senate on March 15, 2021, by a vote of 51–40. Following her swearing-in on March 16, she became the first Native American to serve as a Cabinet secretary and the second to serve in the Cabinet, after Republican former vice president and Kaw Nation citizen Charles Curtis.

=== Bison slaughter and Indian suppression ===
Delano has also received criticism for allowing millions of bison to be slaughtered, with the exception of Yellowstone, in order to compel the Indians to move to and remain on their reservations, a policy approved by President Grant and the U.S. Army. The demise of the bison herds during Delano's tenure led to the destruction of the Plains Indian culture, including their economy, cosmology, and religion. Without the bison, the Plains Indians could not resist late 19th-century expansionism, including the development of the railroads in the American West. This policy led to more restrictive measures against Native Americans in the 1880s and 1890s, including the banning of medicine making, polygamy, bride payments, and the Sun Dance.

=== Yellowstone and bison recovery ===
The National Park Service was created in 1916. Delano had recommended its creation in 1874.

Delano was the first Secretary of the Interior to be in charge of Yellowstone, America's and the world's first national park. The charges of misconduct and lax management made during Delano's tenure at the Interior did not include the new park, the management of which was seen as a success. Among its features, it outlawed poaching wildlife and served as a haven for small numbers of free-roaming bison, left after the slaughter of the great herds that, with the exception of Yellowstone, Delano had fully supported. On August 25, 1916, Congress created the National Park Service to federally protect and administer Yellowstone and other national parks; Delano had proposed the creation of the agency in 1874. Yellowstone today generates around 4 million visitors per year.

By 1902, poachers had illegally killed and reduced Yellowstone bison herd size to about two dozen animals. The U.S. Army, which administered Yellowstone, prior to the creation of the National Park Service, took over and protected the last remaining bison from further poaching. Bison from private herds were incorporated into Yellowstone, forming a northern herd. For decades, however, as Yellowstone bisons increased in number, herds were reduced, believing the animals had caused overgrazing. The practice of reducing the Yellowstone bison population ceased in 1968. However, by the 2000s, the reduction of Yellowstone bison herds resumed, "due to increasing numbers and litigation about migration into Montana." As of August 2019, Yellowstone had 4,829 bison from two herds, 3,667 northern bison, and 1,162 central bison.

=== Corruption aftermath and the Pendleton Act ===
In the aftermath of Delano's departure and retirement from the Interior in 1875 and Chandler reforms, the large department still experienced scandals but was much less pervasive than during Delano's tenure. During the Rutherford B. Hayes administration, on May 31, 1880, a Senate committee reported on the Interior Department and Secretary of the Interior Carl Schurz, a reformer, over his removal and jailing of the Ponca Indians. On December 18, 1880, a commission appointed Hayes, began an investigation of the department's treatment of the Ponca. On January 25, 1881, the commission reported to President Hayes the treatment of the Ponca was "needlessly disastrous and cruel".

In January 1883, President Arthur signed into law the landmark legislation, known as the Pendleton Act, that made civil service reform permanent, with the goal to reduce corruption and hire persons based on a merit system, rather than patronage. Patterned off Grant's Civil Service Commission (1871) and rules, the Act put 11 percent of the federal workforce under civil service law, and reestablished the Civil Service Commission, to regulate political assessments and payoffs. Good men were appointed by Arthur to run the commission, and surprisingly, Arthur was friendly to reformers. The passage of the act was motivated by the assassination of President James A. Garfield by a disgruntled office seeker.

Scandals continued to periodically surface. In 1884, William W. Dudley, Commissioner of the Pensions Office, was engaged in political activity, promising expedited approval to petitioners who voted for James G. Blaine and John A. Logan, the Republicans President and Vice President candidates. President Chester A. Arthur, a Republican, did nothing to stop the practice. In 1888, Secretary of Interior William F. Vilas, appointed by President Grover Cleveland (1885-1889), a Democrat, was investigated by Congress. Vilas was a stockholder of the Superior Lumber Company and was suspected of profiteering. In 1889, the Senate investigation report concluded that Vilas did not personally profiteer.

During the Benjamin Harrison Republican administration (1889-1893), an Interior probe investigation found evidence Harrison's appointed Pension Bureau Commissioner James R. Tanner took "lavish and illegal handouts". Tanner resigned and Harrison appointed Green B. Raum Pension Bureau Commissioner. Raum was accused of taking kickback loans to expedite pension cases. A Democratic House investigation said Raum had "prostituted his office" and should be removed, but Harrison declined.

=== Personal reputation ===
In 1898, historian Joseph Patterson Smith said Delano had attained, "a long and distinguished career, as an eminent lawyer, an able businessman and one intimately identified with the governmental affairs of the state and nation." In 2001, historian Jean Edward Smith, taking a harsher view, said Delano betrayed his public trust while Secretary of the Interior by allowing corruption to pervade throughout his department, "at the expense of those who most needed government assistance: the Native American." Benjamin Bristow, Grant's appointed Secretary of Treasury, said Secretary Delano was "a very mean dog," and deserved "the execration of every honest man."

=== Honors ===
==== Delano, California ====
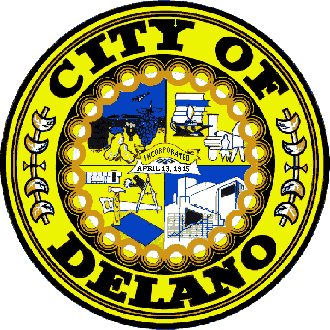
Seal of Delano

Delano, California, located in Kern County, originally a terminal railroad town, was founded on July 14, 1869. The unnamed town was officially named in honor of Columbus Delano, at the time Delano was Secretary of the Interior, during the Grant administration. The name of Delano was officially given by the Southern Pacific Railroad. Delano's first post office opened in 1874. The town of Delano was incorporated as a city in 1915.

==== Mountains ====
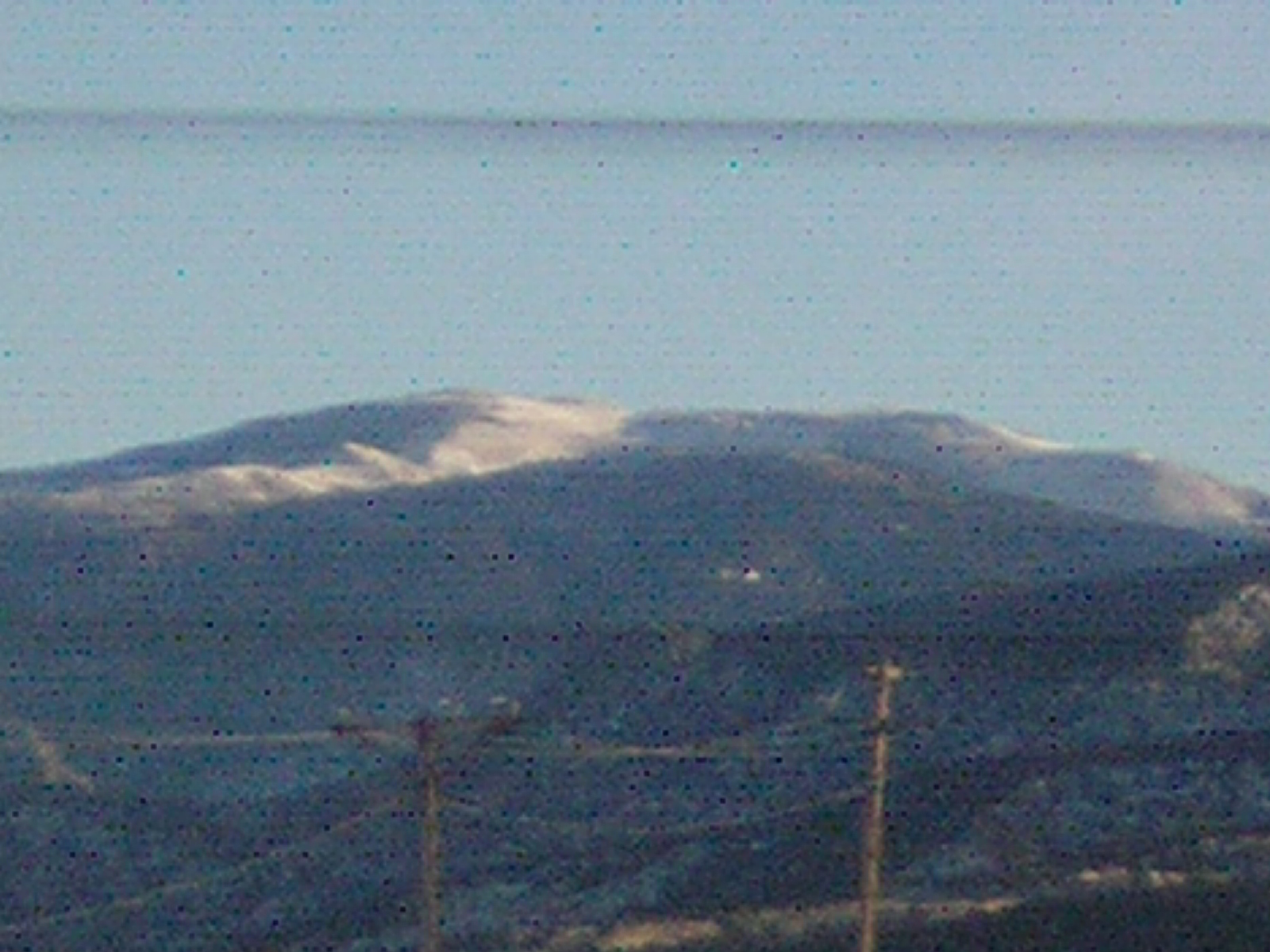
Delano Peak, Utah

Certain mountains in Utah (Delano Peak) and Montana (Mount Delano) are named after Delano. Delano Peak, in Utah, has an elevation of 12,174 ft (3,711 m). NAVD 88 Mount Delano, in Montana, has an elevation of 10,138 ft (3,090 m).

=== Notable Department of the Interior events ===
- 1856–1873 – Interior's Pacific Wagon Road Office improved the historic western emigrant routes.
- 1869 – The Bureau of Education is placed under Interior (later transferred to the Department of Health, Education and Welfare).
- 1869–1870 – Cook–Folsom–Peterson Expedition Yellowstone
- 1870 – Washburn–Langford–Doane Expedition Yellowstone
- 1871 – Hayden Geological Survey of 1871 Yellowstone sponsored by the federal government. Delano instructed the survey.
- 1872 – Congress establishes Yellowstone as the first National Park.
- 1873 – Congress transferred territorial oversight from the secretary of state to the secretary of the interior.

== Sources ==
=== Books ===
- Brands, H. W. (2012). The Man Who Saved the Union: Ulysses S. Grant in War and Peace. New York: Doubleday. ISBN 978-0-385-53241-9.
- Calhoun, Charles W. (2017). The Presidency of Ulysses S. Grant. Lawrence, Kansas: University Press of Kansas. ISBN 9780700624843.
- Castel, Albert E. (1979). The Presidency of Andrew Johnson. Lawrence, KS: Regents Press of Kansas. ISBN 9780700601905.
- Cooper, Edward S. (2005). William Babcock Hazen: The Best Hated Man. Cranbury, NJ: Associated University Presses. ISBN 978-0-8386-4089-0.
- Chernow, Ron (2017). Grant. New York: Penguin Press. ISBN 978-1-59420-487-6.
- Chittenden, Hiram Martin (1904). Yellowstone National Park: Historical and Descriptive. Cincinnati: The Robert Clarke Company.
- Culpin, Mary Shivers (January 2003). "For the Benefit and Enjoyment of the People" A History of Concession Development In Yellowstone National Park, 1872-1966 (PDF). Yellowstone National Park, Wyoming: National Park Service, Yellowstone Center for Resources. Archived from the original (PDF) on April 15, 2016.
- Howard, James Henri; Le Claire, Peter (1995). The Ponca Tribe. Lincoln, Nebraska: University of Nebraska Press. ISBN 0-8032-7279-0.
- Michno, Gregory F. (2003). Encyclopedia of Indian Wars. Missoula, Montana: Mountain Press Publishing Company. ISBN 0-87842-468-7.
- Olson, James C. (1965). Red Cloud and the Sioux problem. Lincoln, Nebraska: University of Nebraska Press. ISBN 978-0-8032-5817-4. OCLC 728240.
- Prucha, Francis Paul (1984). The Great Father: The United States Government and the American Indians. Vol. 1–2. University of Nebraska: University of Nebraska Press. ISBN 0-8032-8734-8.
- The Detroit Post and Tribune (1880). Zachariah Chandler An Outline Sketch of His Life and Public Services. Detroit: The Post and Tribune Company Publishers.
- Garrison, Wendell Phillips (1909). Letters and Memorials of Wendell Phillips Garrison, Literary Editor of "The Nation", 1865-1906. Boston, MA: Houghton Mifflin Company. p. 211.
- Hill, N. N. Jr. (1881). History of Knox County, Ohio. Mt. Vernon, OH: A. A. Graham & Co. p. 398.
- Howe, Henry (1891). Historical Collections of Ohio. Vol. II. Columbus: Henry Howe & Son.
- McDonald, John (1880). Secrets of the Great Whiskey Ring. St. Louis: W. S. Bryan.
- McFeely, William S. (1981). Grant: A Biography. Norton. ISBN 0-393-01372-3.
- McFeely, William S. (1974). "Ulysses S. Grant". In Woodward, C. Vann (ed.). Responses of the Presidents to Charges of Misconduct. New York, New York: Dell Publishing. pp. 115–140. ISBN 0-440-05923-2. OCLC 577314170.
- Ohio State Board of Agriculture (1884). Thirty-Eighth Annual Report. Columbus: Myers Brothers.
- Parins, James W. (2006). Elias Cornelius Boudinot: A Life on the Cherokee Border. Lincoln: University of Nebraska Press. ISBN 978-0-8032-3752-0.
- Simon, John Y. (2002). Henry F. Graff (ed.). The Presidents A Reference History. New York, NY: Charles Scribner's Sons. pp. 269–292. ISBN 0-684-31226-3.
- Smith, Jean Edward (2001). Grant. New York: Simon & Schuster. ISBN 0-684-84927-5.
- Smith, Joseph Patterson (1898). History of the Republican Party in Ohio. Vol. 1. Chicago: The Lewis Publishing Company. pp. 711–714.
- Sproat, John G. (1974). Woodward, C. Vann (ed.). Responses of the Presidents to Charges of Misconduct. New York, New York: Delacorte Press. pp. 163–176, 181–186. ISBN 0-440-05923-2.
- Weisberger, Bernard A. (2002). "James A. Garfield and Chester A. Arthur". In Graff, Henry F. (ed.). The Presidents A Reference History. New York, NY: Charles Scribner's Sons. pp. 269–292. ISBN 0-684-31226-3.
- White, Richard (1991). It's Your Misfortune and None of My Own: A New History of the American West. Norman, Oklahoma: University of Oklahoma Press Norman. ISBN 0-8061-2567-5.
- White, Ronald C. (2016). American Ulysses: A Life of Ulysses S. Grant. Random House Publishing Group. ISBN 978-1-58836-992-5.
- Williams, C. S. (1857). Williams' Ohio State Register and Business Mirror, for 1857. Cincinnati: C. S. Williams. p. 170.
- Williams, R. Hal (1974). Woodward, C. Vann (ed.). Responses of the Presidents to Charges of Misconduct. New York, New York: Delacorte Press. pp. 187–190, 191–196. ISBN 0-440-05923-2.

=== Internet ===
- "Delano, Columbus, (1809 - 1896)". Biographical Directory of the United States Congress 1774-Present. Washington D.C.
- Jawort, Adrian (2011-05-09). "Genocide by Other Means: U.S. Army Slaughtered Buffalo in Plains Indian Wars". Indian Country. Archived from the original on July 2, 2016.
- Grant, Ulysses S. (April 16, 1872). "Executive Order April 16, 1872". The American Presidency Project.
- "Yellowstone Visitation Statistics". National Park Service.
- Jordan, Mark Sebastian (November 27, 2021). "Meet Columbus Delano, Mount Vernon's mover & shaker". Knox Pages.
- "The invasion of America". Aeon. January 7, 2015.
- Wade, Lizzie (October 28, 2021). "Native tribes have lost 99% of their land in the United". Science.

=== New York Times ===
- "Speech of Hon. Columbus Delano, of Ohio" (PDF). The New York Times. September 7, 1867.
- "Whisky Raid in Georgia" (PDF). New York Times. February 6, 1870.
- "Secretary Delano Resigns" (PDF). New York Times. September 27, 1875.
- "Certain Surveying Frauds" (PDF). New York Times. April 12, 1876.
- "Judge Wright Sent to Jail" (PDF). New York Times. April 4, 1880.
- "Political Wool Growers" (PDF). New York Times. December 4, 1889.

=== Newspapers ===
- "Fine Specimen of a Judge". Lebanon Daily News. Lebanon, PA. October 13, 1877. p. 1 – via Newspapers.com.
- "Washington News". Harrisburg Telegraph. Harrisburg, PA. April 8, 1880. p. 1 – via Newspapers.com.
- "Sudden Death of a Son of Hon. Columbus Delano". Elwood Daily Press. Elwood, IN. August 14, 1896 – via Newspapers.com.
- "Rev. John G. Ames and wife have gone to Ohio, owing to the sudden death of the latter's only brother, Mr. John Delano". Washington Evening Star. Washington, DC. August 15, 1896 – via Newspapers.com.
- "HON. COLUMBUS DELANO DIES SUDDENLY AT HIS HOME IN OHIO". Sacramento Daily Union. Vol. 92, no. 64. October 24, 1896.

=== Speeches ===
- Delano, Columbus (July 24, 1872). "Speech of Hon. Columbus Delano". Raleigh, North Carolina.

U.S. House of Representatives
Preceded by Alfred P. Stone	Member of the U.S. House of Representatives from Ohio's 10th congressional district March 4, 1845 – March 3, 1847	Succeeded by Daniel Duncan
Preceded by John O'Neill	Member of the U.S. House of Representatives from Ohio's 13th congressional district March 4, 1865 – March 3, 1867	Succeeded by George W. Morgan
Preceded by George W. Morgan	Member of the U.S. House of Representatives from Ohio's 13th congressional district June 3, 1868 – March 3, 1869	Succeeded by George W. Morgan
Ohio House of Representatives
Preceded by Walt Whitney	Member of the Ohio House of Representatives from Knox County; 1864-1865	Succeeded by Henry B. Banning
Government offices
Preceded by Edward A. Rollins	Commissioner of Internal Revenue; March 11, 1869 – October 31, 1870	Succeeded by Alfred Pleasonton
Political offices
Preceded by Jacob D. Cox	U.S. Secretary of the Interior; Served under: Ulysses S. Grant; November 1, 1870 – September 30, 1875	Succeeded by Zachariah Chandler
