= Mount Vernon City School District (Ohio) =

School district in Ohio

Mount Vernon City School District is a public school district serving students Mount Vernon in Knox County, Ohio. It oversees Mount Vernon High School, Mount Vernon Middle School, Columbia Elementary, Dan Emmett Elementary, East Elementary, Pleasant Street Elementary, Twin Oak Elementary, and Wiggin Street Elementary. The district received national attention when the board voted to fire John Freshwater for branding a student with a Christian cross and teaching creationism.
