= Evelyn Francis Snow =

1922 Ohio Republican Governor Primary Candidate

Evelyn Francis Snow was born in Columbus, Ohio and was the first woman to run for Governor in the state in 1922. She ultimately lost in the primary, coming in eight out of the twelve that ran. She was married and had a daughter, Charles A. Snow. She died of a heart attack on July 4, 1946.

== Personal life ==
Snow was raised in Mount Vernon, Ohio. She was an original member of the Ohio State Board of Censorship. In 1926, she attended the county W.C.T.U mid-year meeting in the Uhrichsville Methodist Church. At that meeting, Snow addressed the need for more strict movie censorship.

Snow spoke in Marysville, Ohio in July 1926. Many were in attendance as Snow spoke on "True Patriotism." She was received well and called a very pleasing speaker.

In August 1926, Snow spoke at the Canton Republican Women's Club. One hundred Republican women were in attendance.

On July 4, 1946, Snow died of a heart attack. Her funeral was held in Mt. Vernon, Ohio on July 6, 1946.

== 1926 bid for Governor of Ohio ==
In 1922 Snow filed her declaration of candidacy with the Secretary of State for the Republican nomination for governor. She was the first woman in Ohio to try for the office. Snow ran as a Republican and came in eighth out of twelve in the 1922 Republican Primary.
