= Mount Delano =

Mountain in Montana, United States

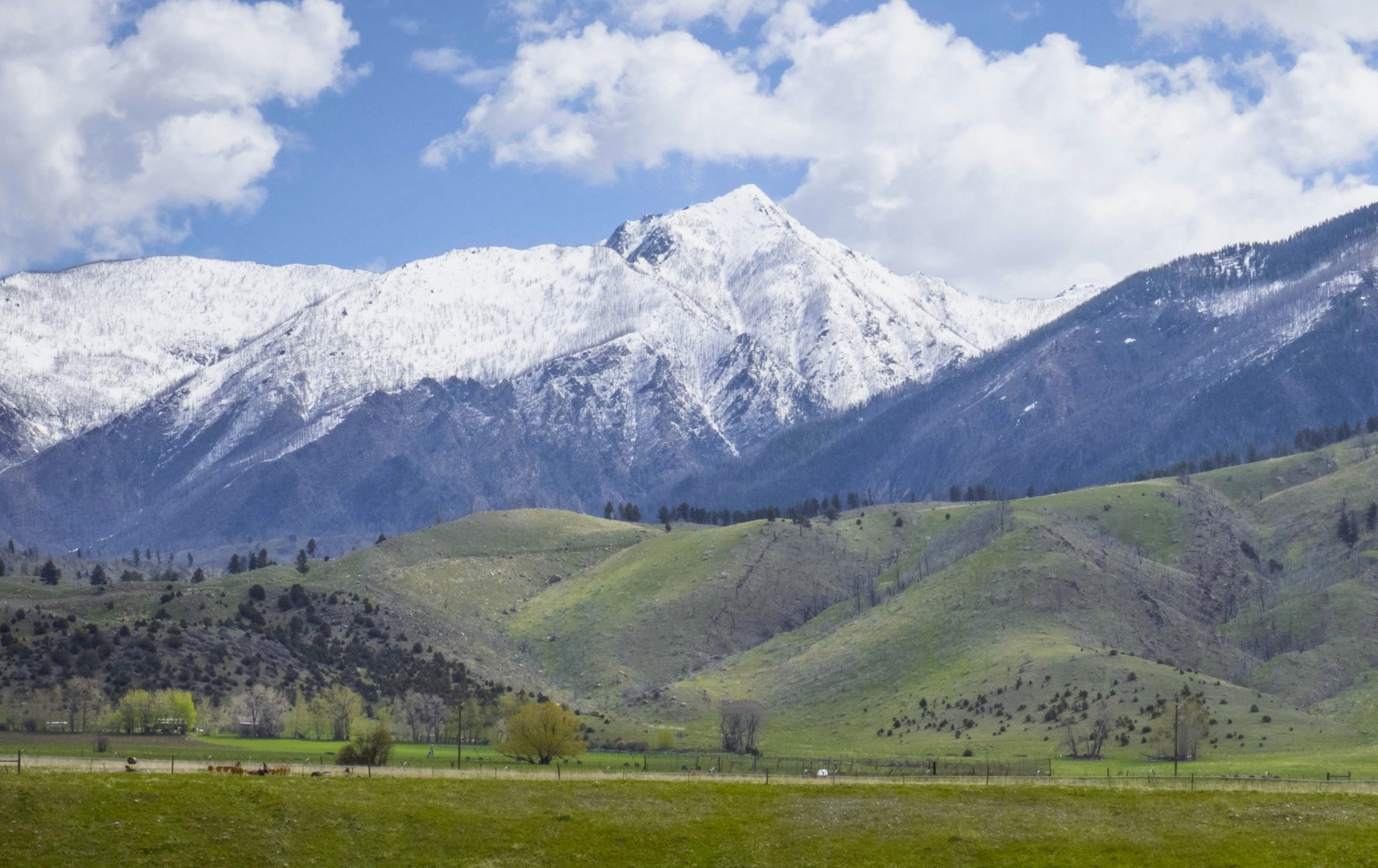
- West aspect

Highest point
- Elevation: 10,159 ft (3,096 m)
- Prominence: 664 ft (202 m)
- Parent peak: Mount McKnight (10,310 ft)
- Isolation: 1.99 mi (3.20 km)
- Coordinates: 45°31′25″N 110°28′17″W

Naming
- Etymology: Columbus Delano

Geography
- Location within Montana Location within the United States
- Country: United States
- State: Montana
- County: Park
- Protected area: Absaroka-Beartooth Wilderness
- Parent range: Absaroka Range
- Topo map: USGS Livingston Peak

Mount Delano is a 10,159-foot (3,096-metre) mountain summit in Park County, Montana, United States.

== Description ==
Mount Delano is located nine miles (14 km) south-southeast of Livingston in the northern Absaroka Range, which is a subrange of the Rocky Mountains. It is situated in the Absaroka-Beartooth Wilderness on land managed by Gallatin National Forest, and can be seen from Highway 89 when travelling between Livingston and Yellowstone National Park. Precipitation runoff from the mountain drains into the north and south forks of Deep Creek which is a tributary of the Yellowstone River. Topographic relief is significant as the summit rises 3,000 feet (914 meters) above the South Fork in 0.9 miles (1.4 km); 4,000 feet (1,219 meters) above the North Fork in two miles (3.2 km); and 5,500 feet (1,676 meters) above the Yellowstone in five miles (8.0 km). The mountain's toponym, which honors Columbus Delano (1809–1896), has been officially adopted by the United States Board on Geographic Names, and has been printed in publications since at least 1873. Delano served as President Ulysses S. Grant's Secretary of the Interior and he was instrumental in the establishment of America's first national park, Yellowstone.

== Climate ==
Based on the Köppen climate classification, Mount Delano is located in a subarctic climate zone characterized by long, usually very cold winters, and mild summers. Winter temperatures can drop below 0 °F with wind chill factors below −10 °F.

== See also ==
- Geology of the Rocky Mountains

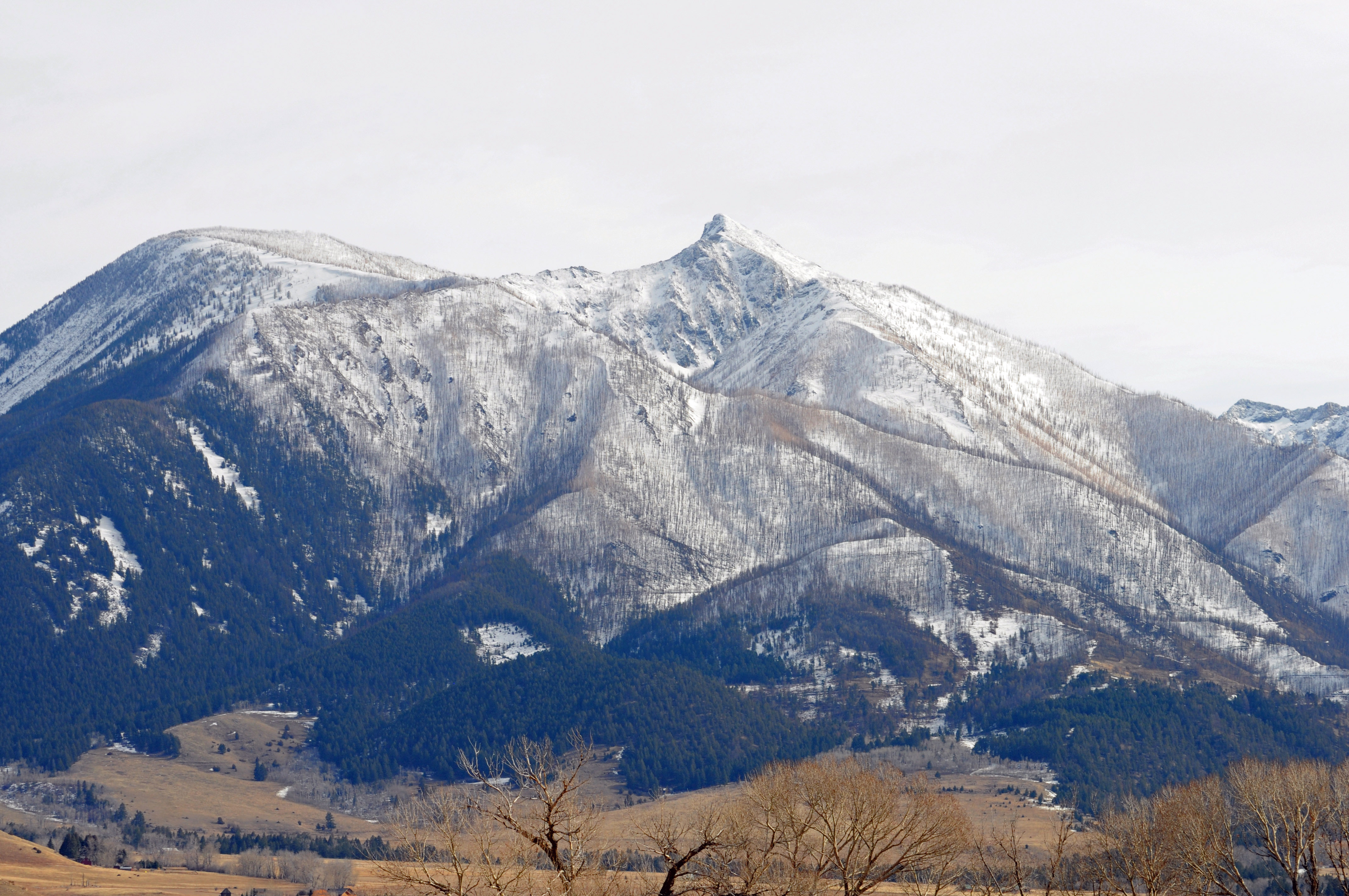
Northwest aspect
