= Mount Vernon High School (Ohio) =

Public, coeducational high school in Ohio, U.S.

Location
- 300 Yellow Jacket Drive; Mount Vernon, Ohio 43050; United States
- Coordinates: 40.3786°N 82.4740°W

Information
- Type: Public
- School district: Mount Vernon City School District
- NCES School ID: 391001201356
- Principal: Cory Caughlan
- Teaching staff: 51.50 (FTE)
- Grades: 9–12
- Enrollment: 944 (2024–25)
- Student to teacher ratio: 18.33
- Campus type: Suburban
- Colors: Orange and black
- Athletics conference: Licking County League
- Team name: Yellow Jackets
- Accreditation: Ohio Department of Education
- Website: mvhs.mt-vernon.k12.oh.us

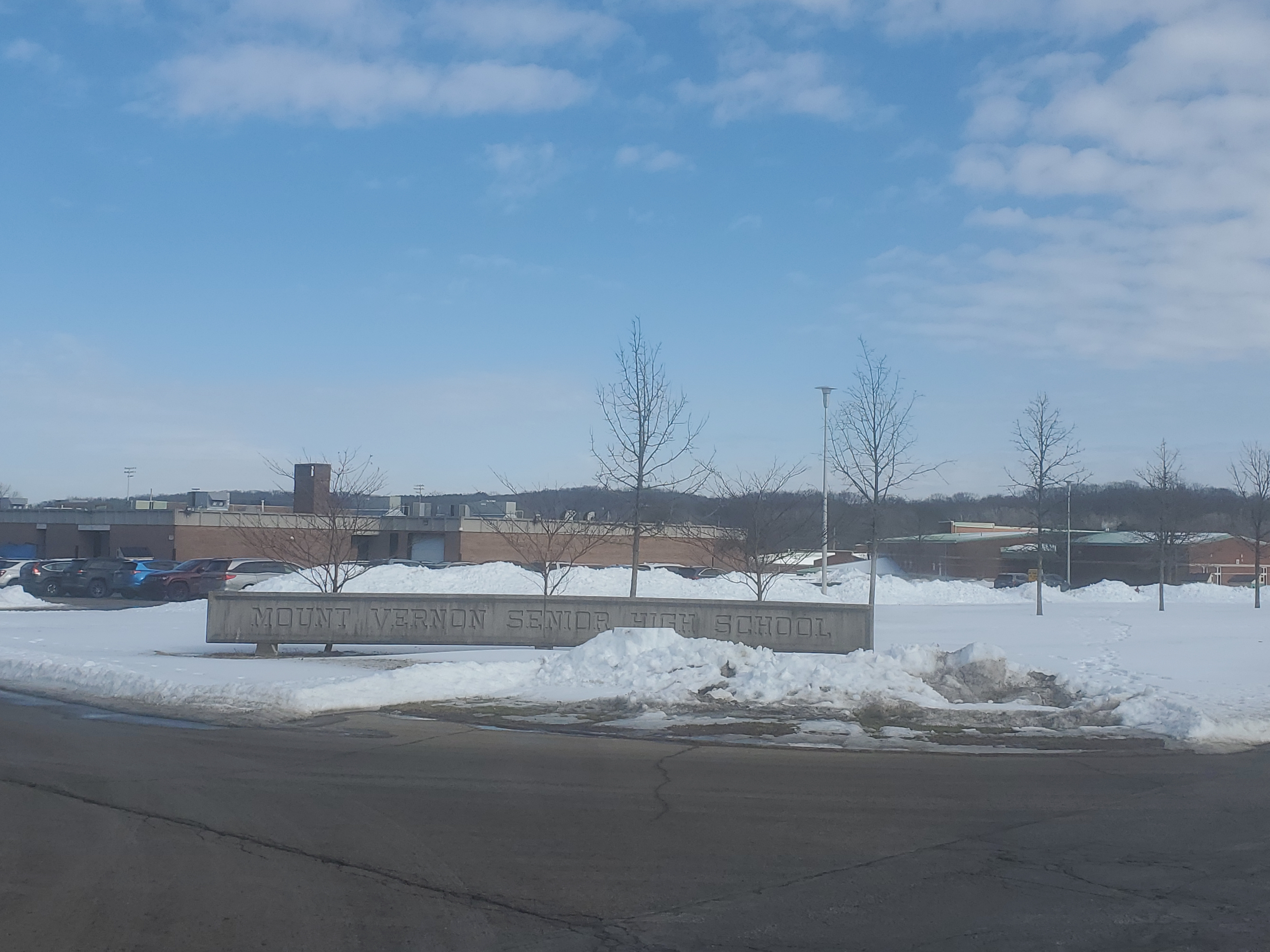
Mount Vernon High School.jpg

Mount Vernon High School is a public four-year high school located in Mount Vernon, Ohio, United States. It is the only high school in the Mount Vernon City School District. The school's athletic teams are known as the Yellow Jackets, and its official colors are orange and black. The school competes as a member of the Licking County League.

== Notable alumni ==
- David Hahn, politician, class of 1973
- Paul Lynde, actor, class of 1944
