= Ellamae Simmons =

American immunologist (1918–2019)

- Born: Mount Vernon, Ohio
- Citizenship: American
- Scientific career
- Fields: Immunologist

Ellamae Simmons (March 26, 1918 – May 10, 2019) was the first Black female medical doctor in the United States to specialize in immunology.

== Life ==
Simmons graduated from Mount Vernon High School and hoped to study medicine and become a doctor. She was denied student housing and admission by Ohio State University. Instead, she attended Hampton Institute in Virginia, studying nursing.

She went on to integrate the United States Army Nurse Corps as one of eight Black nurses during World War 2. After her service, she was finally admitted to The Ohio State University, studying pre-med. She was the first Black woman to live in an on-campus dormitory at the university. From OSU, she went on to Howard University College of Medicine, graduating with her M.D. in 1959.

Simmons completed her residency in and later a Fellowship in Allergy, Asthma and Immunology at National Jewish Hospital in Denver.

Simmons found work in 1964 at Kaiser Permanente San Francisco hospital after a harrowing job interview that lasted several days. She published her autobiography, Overcome: My Life in Pursuit of a Dream, in 2017 at the age of 97.
