= Mount Vernon, Ohio =

- City
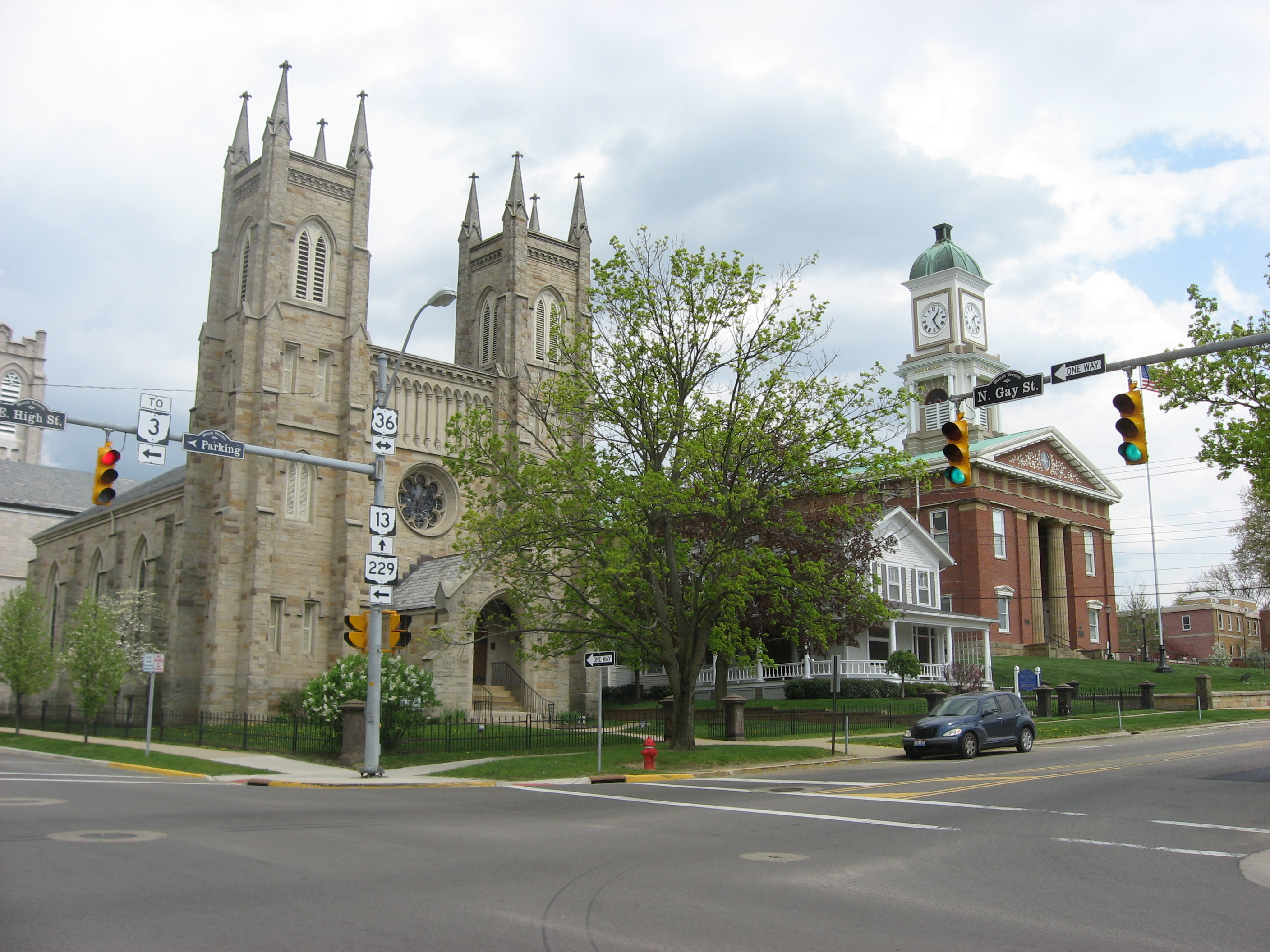
- East High Street Historic District, Mount Vernon

- Flag Logo
- Motto: "One of Ohio's Most Likable Communities"
- Interactive map of Mount Vernon, Ohio
- Location within Ohio Location within the United States
- Coordinates: 40°23′00″N 82°29′00″W
- Country: United States
- State: Ohio
- County: Knox

Area
  - Total: 9.92 sq mi (25.68 km^{2})
  - Land: 9.73 sq mi (25.20 km^{2})
  - Water: 0.19 sq mi (0.48 km^{2})
- Elevation: 974 ft (297 m)

Population (2020)
  - Total: 16,956
  - Density: 1,742.6/sq mi (672.82/km^{2})
- Time zone: UTC-5 (Eastern (EST))
  - Summer (DST): UTC-4 (EDT)
- ZIP code: 43050
- Area code: 740
- FIPS code: 39-53102
- GNIS feature ID: 1086410
- Website: https://www.mtvernonoh.gov/

Mount Vernon is a city in Knox County, Ohio, United States, and its county seat. It is located along the Kokosing River, 40 miles (64 km) northeast of Columbus. The population was 16,956 at the 2020 census.

== History ==
The community was platted in 1805, and named after Mount Vernon, the estate owned by George Washington.

In May 1953, the telephone exchange for the entire city was destroyed by fire, disrupting calls for months.

In January 1959, a severe flood caused 500 homes to be evacuated and caused $5 million in damage.

=== Historic sites ===
The Woodward Opera House, the oldest opera theater of its kind in the United States, is located downtown. The theater, after many years of renovation and restoration, has been transformed into a local cultural and performing-arts center.

The Knox County Historical Society, with a building and extensive exhibits, makes its headquarters on Harcourt Road in Mount Vernon. Exhibits feature information about Daniel Decatur Emmett, Paul Lynde, The Cooper Company and other subjects.

== Geography ==
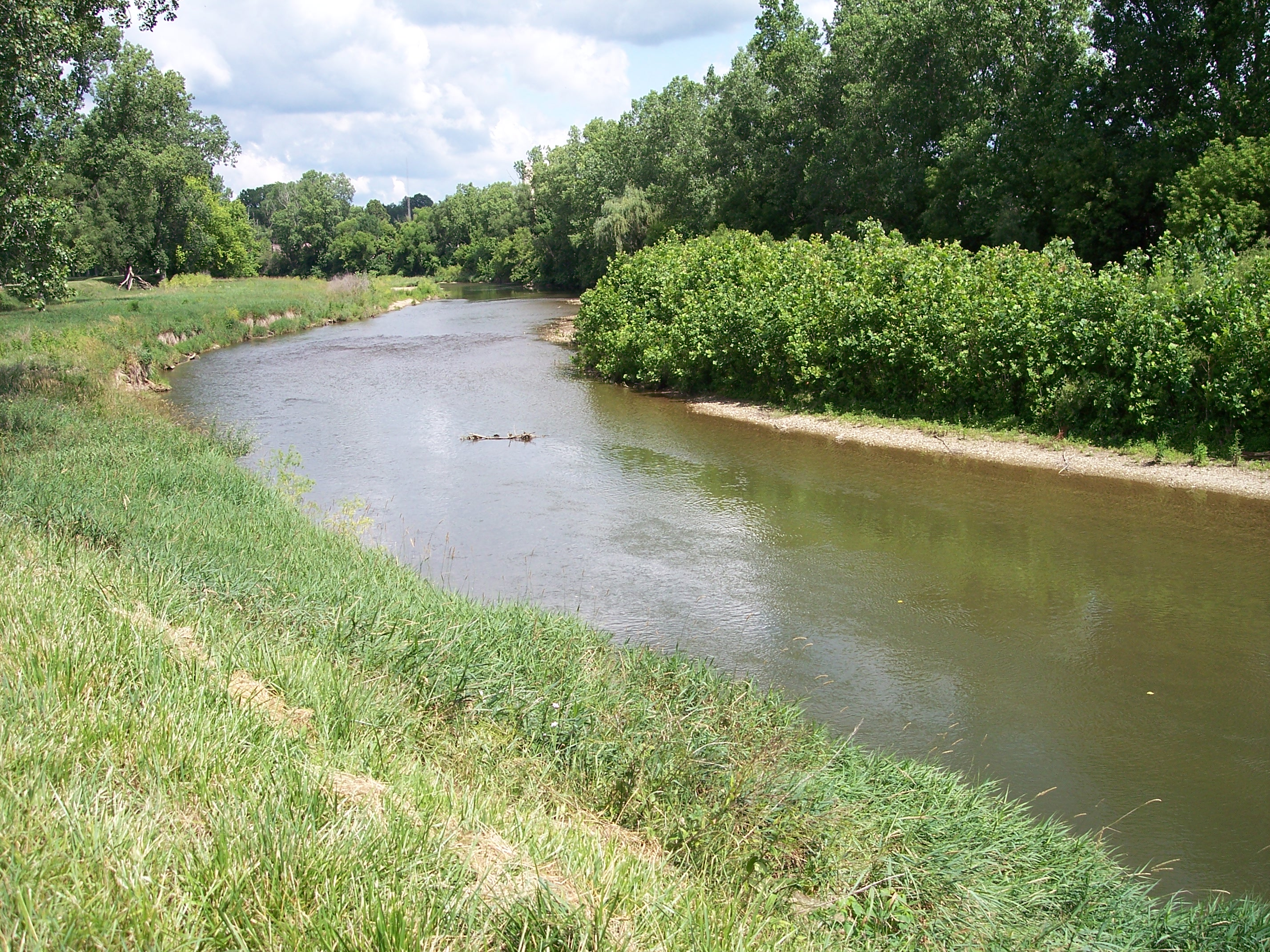
The Kokosing River in Mount Vernon in 2006

According to the United States Census Bureau, the city has a total area of 9.60 square miles (24.86 km^{2}), of which 9.41 square miles (24.37 km^{2}) is land and 0.19 square miles (0.49 km^{2}) is water. The city lies in the Glaciated Allegheny Plateau and is surrounded by rolling hills and valleys.

The Kokosing River and U.S. Route 36 pass through the city.

== Demographics ==
Historical population
Census	Pop.	Note	%±
1810	314		—
1820	403		28.3%
1830	1,021		153.3%
1840	2,363		131.4%
1850	3,711		57.0%
1860	4,202		13.2%
1870	4,876		16.0%
1880	5,249		7.6%
1890	6,027		14.8%
1900	6,638		10.1%
1910	9,087		36.9%
1920	9,237		1.7%
1930	9,370		1.4%
1940	10,122		8.0%
1950	12,185		20.4%
1960	13,284		9.0%
1970	13,373		0.7%
1980	14,362		7.4%
1990	14,550		1.3%
2000	15,256		4.9%
2010	16,990		11.4%
2020	16,956		−0.2%
2025 (est.)	17,287		2.0%

=== 2020 census ===
As of the 2020 census, Mount Vernon had a population of 16,956. The median age was 38.4 years. 20.5% of residents were under the age of 18 and 20.5% of residents were 65 years of age or older. For every 100 females there were 89.5 males, and for every 100 females age 18 and over there were 86.2 males age 18 and over.

99.0% of residents lived in urban areas, while 1.0% lived in rural areas.

There were 7,047 households in Mount Vernon, of which 25.2% had children under the age of 18 living in them. Of all households, 35.6% were married-couple households, 21.0% were households with a male householder and no spouse or partner present, and 34.4% were households with a female householder and no spouse or partner present. About 37.9% of all households were made up of individuals and 17.1% had someone living alone who was 65 years of age or older.

There were 7,662 housing units, of which 8.0% were vacant. The homeowner vacancy rate was 2.5% and the rental vacancy rate was 5.8%.

Racial composition as of the 2020 census
Race	Number	Percent
White	15,471	91.2%
Black or African American	250	1.5%
American Indian and Alaska Native	77	0.5%
Asian	98	0.6%
Native Hawaiian and Other Pacific Islander	2	0.0%
Some other race	170	1.0%
Two or more races	888	5.2%
Hispanic or Latino (of any race)	474	2.8%

=== 2010 census ===
As of the census of 2010, there were 16,990 people, 7,110 households, and 4,016 families living in the city. The population density was 1,805.5 inhabitants per square mile (697.1/km^{2}). There were 7,836 housing units at an average density of 832.7 per square mile (321.5/km^{2}). The racial makeup of the city was 95.3% White, 1.1% African American, 0.2% Native American, 1.1% Asian, 0.7% from other races, and 1.5% from two or more races. Hispanic or Latino of any race were 1.8% of the population.

There were 7,110 households, of which 28.3% had children under the age of 18 living with them, 38.4% were married couples living together, 13.6% had a female householder with no husband present, 4.4% had a male householder with no wife present, and 43.5% were non-families. 38.0% of all households were made up of individuals, and 16.5% had someone living alone who was 65 years of age or older. The average household size was 2.19 and the average family size was 2.88.

The median age in the city was 37.2 years. 21.8% of residents were under the age of 18; 13.7% were between the ages of 18 and 24; 23.2% were from 25 to 44; 24% were from 45 to 64; and 17.3% were 65 years of age or older. The gender makeup of the city was 46.5% male and 53.5% female.

=== 2000 census ===
As of the census of 2000, there were 15,256 people, 6,187 households, and 3,730 families living in the city. The population density was 1,710.4 inhabitants per square mile (660.4/km^{2}). There were 6,713 housing units at an average density of 798.7 per square mile (308.4/km^{2}). The "racial" makeup of the city was 96.66% White, 1.15% African American, 0.31% Native American, 0.54% Asian, 0.29% from other races, and 1.04% from two or more "races". Hispanic or Latino of any "race" were 0.87% of the population.

There were 6,187 households, out of which 28.0% had children under the age of 18 living with them, 43.8% were married couples living together, 12.7% had a female householder with no husband present, and 39.7% were non-families. 34.2% of all households were made up of individuals, and 16.1% had someone living alone who was 65 years of age or older. The average household size was 2.25 and the average family size was 2.88.

In the city the population was spread out, with 23.7% under the age of 18, 10.1% from 18 to 24, 27.2% from 25 to 44, 20.7% from 45 to 64, and 18.3% who were 65 years of age or older. The median age was 37 years. For every 100 females, there were 86.2 males. For every 100 females age 18 and over, there were 81.3 males.

The median income for a household in the city was $29,801, and the median income for a family was $38,217. Males had a median income of $31,900 versus $21,969 for females. The per capita income for the city was $16,471. About 12.7% of families and 15.6% of the population were below the poverty line, including 20.7% of those under age 18 and 9.2% of those age 65 or over.

== Economy ==
Mount Vernon was the birthplace of Cooper Industries. There is a large industrial complex in the western part of the city that manufactures and repairs products for the gas and oil power generation industries. It was acquired by Rolls-Royce North America, and in 2014 Siemens bought the Mount Vernon plant. Facing a declining market, Siemens announced major reductions in employment in October 2016 and in 2018 announced their Mount Vernon facility would close by 2019.

Ariel Corporation, a major manufacturer of reciprocating natural gas (and other gasses) compressors, is also located in Mount Vernon. Its history is tied to that of Cooper Industries in that Jim Buchwald, one of the founders of Ariel, was a former engineer for Cooper Industries Mount Vernon.

Two universities in Mount Vernon and nearby Gambier, Ohio provide hundreds of jobs to the local residents. Mount Vernon is home to Mount Vernon Nazarene University and Gambier is home to Kenyon College.

== Education ==
=== Colleges and universities ===
- Mount Vernon Nazarene University
- Central Ohio Technical College, Knox Campus

=== High schools ===
- Mount Vernon High School (Mount Vernon City School District)
- Knox County Career Center

== Notable people ==
- Johnny Appleseed (John Chapman), pioneer and folkloric figure
- Eldad Cicero Camp, coal tycoon
- Fred Dailey, State of Ohio Agriculture Director and US Congressional candidate
- Hiram and Barney Davis, two dwarf brothers and side-show performers
- Columbus Delano, Whig and Republican politician and lawyer
- Daniel Decatur Emmett, composer of "Dixie", Early Blackface performer
- Lansford Hastings, California pioneer
- Rob Kelly, NFL football player
- Paul Lynde, comedian and actor
- Stephen Markley, journalist and author
- Chris McLernon, musician and actor
- George W. Morgan, general and U.S. Congressman
- Juan Manuel García Passalacqua, Puerto Rican politician and television personality
- Ellamae Simmons, first African American woman to specialize in asthma, allergy, and immunology in the United States.
- Evelyn Francis Snow, first female candidate for governor of Ohio
- Ralph W. Sockman, clergyman, author, and radio speaker
- Joan Steinbrenner, wife of New York Yankees owner, George Steinbrenner
- Jim Stillwagon, American football player
- Jesse B. Thomas, first senator of Illinois and proposer of the Missouri Compromise
- Jason Wolfe, racing driver
