= List of OHSAA golf champions =

The Ohio High School Athletic Association (OHSAA) is the governing body of athletic programs for junior and senior high schools in the state of Ohio. It conducts state championship competitions in all the OHSAA-sanctioned sports.

== Boys golf champions ==
Following is a list of boys golf champions.

Year	Boys D I / AAA	Boys D II / AA	Boys D III / A
2026	Dublin Jerome	Warsaw River View	Toledo Ottawa Hills
2025	Dublin Jerome	Kettering Archbishop Alter	Warren John F Kennedy
2024	Akron Archbishop Hoban	Kettering Archbishop Alter	Warren John F Kennedy
2023	Whitehouse Anthony Wayne	Kettering Archbishop Alter	Warren John F Kennedy
2022	Cleveland St Ignatius	Kettering Archbishop Alter	Cincinnati Seven Hills School
2021	Cleveland St Ignatius	Gahanna Columbus Academy	Berlin Hiland
2020	Akron Archbishop Hoban	Gahanna Columbus Academy	Canton Central Catholic
2019	Dublin Jerome	Gahanna Columbus Academy	Berlin Hiland
2018	Dublin Jerome	Gahanna Columbus Academy	Columbus Wellington School
2017	Dublin Jerome	Gahanna Columbus Academy	Worthington Christian
2016	Cincinnati St. Xavier	Cincinnati Archbishop McNicholas	Cincinnati Seven Hills School
2015	Cincinnati St. Xavier	Columbus Bexley	Lancaster Fisher Catholic
2014	Cincinnati Archbishop Moeller	Canton Central Catholic	Gahanna Columbus Academy
2013	Dublin Jerome	Dayton Oakwood	Toledo Ottawa Hills
2012	Dublin Jerome	Dayton Oakwood	Ashland Crestview
2011	Dublin Jerome	Springfield Kenton Ridge	Columbus Wellington School
2010	Columbus St. Charles	Dayton Oakwood	Gates Mills Gilmour Academy
2009	Columbus St. Charles	Dayton Oakwood	Minster
2008	Cincinnati St Xavier	Hunting Valley University School	Sugarcreek Garaway
2007	Dublin Jerome	Hunting Valley University School	Sugarcreek Garaway
2006	Upper Arlington	Hunting Valley University School	Johnstown-Monroe
2005	Dublin Jerome	Lima Bath	Lima Central Catholic
2004	Columbus Bishop Watterson	Dublin Jerome	Sugarcreek Garaway
2003	Copley	Hunting Valley University School	Lima Central Catholic
2002	Cleveland St Ignatius	Sunbury Big Walnut	Lima Central Catholic
2001	Cleveland St Ignatius	Granville	Warren John F Kennedy
2000	West Chester Lakota West	Chardon Notre Dame-Cathedral Latin	Warren John F Kennedy
1999	Upper Arlington	Kettering Archbishop Alter	Gahanna Columbus Academy
1998	Ashland	Kettering Archbishop Alter	Gahanna Columbus Academy
1997	Cuyahoga Falls Walsh Jesuit	Ironton	Gahanna Columbus Academy
1996	Cuyahoga Falls Walsh Jesuit	Ironton	Granville
1995	Cincinnati St Xavier	Ironton	Gahanna Columbus Academy
1994	Toledo St John's Jesuit	Cambridge	Gates Mills Gilmour Academy
1993	Upper Arlington	Kettering Archbishop Alter	Gates Mills Gilmour Academy
1992	Upper Arlington	Kettering Archbishop Alter	Gates Mills Gilmour Academy
1991	Cuyahoga Falls Walsh Jesuit	Gahanna Columbus Academy	Gates Mills Gilmour Academy
1990	Cuyahoga Falls Walsh Jesuit	Hunting Valley University School	Van Buren
1989	Milford	Youngstown Cardinal Mooney	Marion Pleasant
1988	Fairborn	Youngstown Cardinal Mooney	Zanesville Bishop Rosecrans
1987	Toledo St John's Jesuit	Central Catholic	South Charleston Southeastern Local
1986	Upper Arlington	Circleville	Zanesville Bishop Rosecrans
1985	Upper Arlington	Dayton Oakwood	Mount Gilead
1984	Findlay	Central Catholic	Van Buren
1983	Worthington Thomas Worthington	Dublin Coffman	Gahanna Columbus Academy
1982	Upper Arlington	Coshocton	Toledo Ottawa Hills
1981	Upper Arlington	Dublin Coffman	Elmore Woodmore
1980	Wooster	Shelby	North Baltimore
1979	Fairfield	Dublin Coffman	Elmore Woodmore
1978	Worthington Thomas Worthington	Columbus Centennial	Gates Mills Hawken
1977	Upper Arlington	Dublin Coffman	Gates Mills Hawken
1976	Youngstown Ursuline	Columbus Bishop Watterson	Tiffin Calvert
1975	Youngstown Ursuline	Coshocton	New Philadelphia Tuscarawas Central Catholic
1974; Fall ↑	Fairborn Baker	Warren John F Kennedy	Toledo Ottawa Hills
1974 Spring ↓	Upper Arlington	Columbus Bishop Watterson	Sidney Lehman Catholic
1973	Fremont Ross	Columbus Bishop Watterson	Mogadore
1972	Upper Arlington	Columbus Bishop Watterson	Mogadore
1971	Hubbard	Aurora	Mogadore
1970	Coshocton		
1969	Upper Arlington		
1968	Upper Arlington		
1967	Shaker Heights		
1966	Ravenna		
1965	Upper Arlington		
1964	Norton		
1963	Kettering Fairmont West		
1962	Ashland		
1961	Kettering Fairmont		
1960	Upper Arlington		
1959	Shaker Heights		
1958	Shaker Heights		
1957	Cincinnati St Xavier		
1956	Upper Arlington		
1955	Columbus Aquinas		
1954	Columbus Aquinas		
1953	Columbus Aquinas		
1952	Youngstown East		
1951	Circleville		
1950	Toledo DeVilbiss		
1949	Reading		
1948	Hamilton		
1947	Sandusky		
1946	Columbus North		
1945	Columbus North		
1944	Columbus North		
1943	Canton McKinley		
1942	Sylvania Burnham		
1941	Upper Arlington		
1940	Toledo DeVilbiss		
1939	Toledo Libbey		
1938	Worthington Thomas Worthington		
1937	Columbus Central		
1936	Dayton Fairview		
1935	Toledo Libbey		
1934	Dayton Fairview		
1933	Dayton Chaminade		
1932	Columbus North		
1931	Toledo St John's Jesuit		
1930	Toledo Central Catholic		
1929	Dayton Chaminade		
1928	Cincinnati Hughes Center		
1927	Akron St. Vincent		

Note: Golf was a Spring Sport through the 1973-1974 school year and a Fall Sport since.

== Girls golf champions ==
Following is a list of girls champions.

Year	Girls D I	Girls D II
2026	Magnificat	Gahanna Columbus Academy
2025	Dublin Jerome	Gahanna Columbus Academy
2024	Magnificat	Gahanna Columbus Academy
2023	Dublin Jerome	Gahanna Columbus Academy
2022	Centerville	Gahanna Columbus Academy
2021	New Albany	Lima Central Catholic
2020	New Albany	Lima Central Catholic
2019	New Albany	Lima Central Catholic
2018	New Albany	Lima Central Catholic
2017	Olentangy Orange	Independence
2016	Olentangy Orange	Milan Edison
2015	Dublin Jerome	Cortland Lakeview
2014	Dublin Jerome	Dover
2013	Dublin Jerome	Gates Mills Hawken
2012	Dublin Jerome	Perkins
2011	Dublin Jerome	Dayton Chaminade-Julienne
2010	William Mason	Shaker Heights Hathaway Brown
2009	William Mason	Chardon Notre Dame-Cathedral Latin
2008	William Mason	Poland Seminary
2007	Cuyahoga Falls Walsh Jesuit	
2006	West Chester Lakota West	
2005	Dublin Jerome	
2004	Cuyahoga Falls Walsh Jesuit	
2003	Cincinnati Mount Notre Dame	
2002	Cincinnati Mount Notre Dame	
2001	Cuyahoga Falls Walsh Jesuit	
2000	Dublin Coffman	
1999	Cincinnati Ursuline Academy	
1998	Toledo Notre Dame Academy	
1997	Cincinnati St Ursula Academy	
1996	Toledo Notre Dame Academy	
1995	Centerville	
1994	Cincinnati St Ursula Academy	
1993	Toledo Notre Dame Academy	

== See also ==
- List of Ohio High School Athletic Association championships
- List of high schools in Ohio
- Ohio High School Athletic Conferences
- Ohio High School Athletic Association
