= Ohio Central Region defunct athletic conferences =

List of former high school athletic conferences in the Central Ohio

This is a list of former high school athletic conferences in the Central Region of Ohio, as designated by the OHSAA. If a conference had members that span multiple regions, the conference is placed in the article of the region most of its former members hail from. Because the names of localities and their corresponding high schools do not always match and because there is often a possibility of ambiguity with respect to either the name of a locality or the name of a high school, the following table gives both in every case, with the locality name first, in plain type, and the high school name second in boldface type. The school's team nickname is given last.

== Buckeye Athletic Conference ==
- **Bexley** Lions (1991-2003, to Mid-State)
- Sunbury **Big Walnut** Golden Eagles (1991–97, to Ohio Capital)
- **Grandview Heights** Bobcats (1991-2003, to Mid-State)
- Plain City **Jonathan Alder** Pioneers (1991-2003, to Mid-Ohio in 2013)
- **Johnstown-Monroe** Johnnies (1991–94, to Mid-Buckeye)
- Hebron **Lakewood** Lancers (1991-2003, to Mid-State)
- Newark **Licking Valley** Panthers (1991-2003, to Mid-State)
- **London** Red Raiders (1991-2003, to South Central Ohio)
- London **Madison-Plains** Golden Eagles (1991–93, 1997-2003, to South Central Ohio)
- Lewis Center **Olentangy** Braves (1991–97, to Ohio Capital)
- **Utica** Redskins (1991–99, to Mid-Buckeye)
- **West Jefferson** Roughriders (1991-2003 to Mid-State in 2006)
- Washington Court House **Washington** Blue Lions (1993-2003, to South Central Ohio)
- Greenfield **McClain** Tigers (1999-2001, to Southern Buckeye)
- Gahanna **Columbus Academy** Vikings (2001–03, to Mid-State)
- Milford Center **Fairbanks** Panthers (2001–03, to Northwest Central)
- Washington Court House **Miami Trace** Panthers (2001–03, to South Central Ohio)
- **Whitehall-Yearling** Rams (2001–03, to Mid-State)

Buckeye Athletic Conference Divisions (1991–94, unless noted)
East Division	West Division
Bexley (1991–93)	Bexley (1993–94)
Big Walnut	Grandview Heights
Johnstown-Monroe (1993–94)	Johnstown-Monroe (1991–93)
Lakewood	Jonathan Alder
Licking Valley	London
Olentangy	Madison Plains (1991–93)
Utica	West Jefferson
	Washington (1993–94)

Buckeye Athletic Conference Divisions (1994-2003, unless noted)
Buckeye Division	Ohio Division
Bexley	Columbus Academy (2001–03)
Big Walnut (1994–97)	Fairbanks (2001–03)
Lakewood	Grandview Heights
Licking Valley (1997-2003)	Jonathan Alder
London	Licking Valley (1994–97)
Miami Trace (2001–03)	Madison Plains (1997-2003)
McClain (1999-2001)	Utica (1994–97)
Olentagy (1994–97)	Washington (1997-2003)
Utica (1997–99)	West Jefferson
Washington (1994–97)	
Whitehall-Yearling (2001–03)	

== Buckeye Central Conference ==
- **Findlay** Trojans (1987–1995, to Great Lakes League)
- **Fremont Ross** Little Giants (1987–1991, to Great Lakes League)
- **Lancaster** Golden Gales (1987–1995, to Ohio Capital Conference 1997)
- **Newark** Wildcats (1987–1995, to Ohio Capital Conference)
- **Zanesville** Blue Devils (1987–1995, to Ohio Valley Athletic Conference)

The league was created after the Buckeye Conference folded. The league was an unideal resort for member schools that had to bear extensive travel. Fremont Ross was able to gain membership in the now-defunct Great Lakes League in 1991, leaving the four schools to struggle on. Findlay eventually gained membership in the GLL as Zanesville left for the closer OVAC confederation, effectively ending competition. Lancaster and Newark would end up going from leagues struggling to retain members to joining the Ohio Capital Conference, which is the largest proper conference in the state.

== Central Buckeye League ==
There were two versions of the CBL. The first ran from 1929 to 1966. The second version ran from 1976 to 1991, where after joining with schools from the Licking County League, it was rebranded as the Buckeye Athletic Conference (BAC).

First Version (1929-1966)

- **Bexley** Lions (1929–66, to Franklin County League)
- **Grandview Heights** Bobcats (1929–66, to Franklin County League)
- **Granville** Blue Aces (1929–30)
- **Westerville** Wildcats (1929–50, to Mid-6 League)
- **Marysville** Monarchs (1930–45, to Mid-State League (1945–50))
- **Circleville** Tigers (1931–39, to South Central Ohio League)
- Delaware **Hayes** Pacers (1932–66, Delaware Willis Bobcats before 1963)
- **Upper Arlington** Golden Bears (1939–66, to Franklin County League)
- **Worthington** Cardinals (1939–45, to Franklin County League, 1958–66, to Franklin County League)
- **Mount Vernon** Yellow Jackets (1947–66)
- **Urbana** Hillclimbers (1950–66)
- **Whitehall-Yearling** Rams (1958–66, to Metropolitan League)

Second Version (1976-1991)

During this period, the league would play as one division from 1977 through 1980. The league would split its teams beginning in 1981. The two 6 team divisions were roughly divided by enrollment with the larger schools making up the Buckeye Division and the smaller schools forming the Central Division. After New Albany leaves the league in 1984, Olentangy will move to the Central Division with new member, London, replacing Olentangy in the Buckeye. The divisions would drop to 5 members each for the 1990-91 school year as Buckeye Valley & North Union leave.

- Plain City **Jonathan Alder** Pioneers^{1} (1976–91, to BAC)
- **Bexley** Lions (1976–91, to BAC)
- Sunbury **Big Walnut** Eagles^{2} (1976–91, to BAC)
- Gahanna **Columbus Academy** Vikings^{3} (Boys only, 1976–91)
- **Columbus School for Girls** Unicorns (Girls only, 1976–91)
- **Marysville** Monarchs^{4} (1976–91, to Ohio Capital Conference)
- **New Albany** Golden Eagles (1976–84, to Mid-Buckeye League)
- Lewis Center **Olentangy** Braves^{4} (1976–91, to BAC)
- Radnor **Buckeye Valley** Barons^{5} (1977–90, to Mid-Ohio Athletic Conference)
- **Dublin** Shamrocks (1977–91, to Ohio Capital Conference)
- **Grandview Heights** Bobcats (1977–91, to BAC)
- Richwood **North Union** Wildcats (1977–90, to Mid-Ohio Athletic Conference)
- **West Jefferson** Roughriders (1977–91, to BAC)
- **London** Red Raiders (1984–91, to BAC)
1. Concurrent with CBL and Darby Valley League 1976-77.
2. Concurrent with CBL and Mid-Ohio League 1976-77.
3. Concurrent with CBL and Mid-Buckeye League 1976-77.
4. Concurrent with CBL and Metropolitan League 1976-77.
5. Concurrent with CBL and Mid-Ohio League 1977-78.

Central Buckeye League Divisions 1981-91
Buckeye	Central
Bexley	Columbus Academy (boys only)
Big Walnut	Columbus School for Girls (girls only)
Buckeye Valley (81-90)	Grandview Heights
Dublin	Jonathan Alder
London (84-91)	North Union (81-90)
Marysville	New Albany (81-84)
Olentangy (81-84)	Olentangy (84-91)
	West Jefferson

== Central Ohio League ==
One of the first large-school conferences in Central and East Ohio, its widespread geography led to membership instability through its lifespan.

- **Cambridge** Bobcats (1926–58, to Ohio Valley Athletic Conference 1960)
- **Coshocton** Redskins (1926–61, to Cardinal Conference)
- **Lancaster** Golden Gales (1926–85, to Buckeye Central Conference 1987)
- **Mount Vernon** Yellow Jackets (1926–35, 1945–47, to Central Buckeye League)
- **Newark** Wildcats (1926–85, to Buckeye Central Conference 1987)
- **Westerville** Wildcats (1926–29, to Central Buckeye League)
- **Zanesville** Blue Devils (1926–29, 1931–85, Lash until 1954, to Buckeye Central Conference 1987)
- **Marietta** Tigers (1936–85, to Southeast Ohio Athletic League)
- **Chillicothe** Cavaliers (1941–44, to South Central Ohio League, 1948–76, to Ohio Capital Conference)
- **Dover** Tornadoes (1941–57, to Cardinal Conference 1960)
- **Ironton** Tigers (1963–68, to Southeast Ohio Athletic League)
- **Upper Arlington** Golden Bears (1968–81, to Ohio Capital Conference)
- **Grove City** Greyhounds (1976–81, to Ohio Capital Conference)

== Delaware County League ==
- Ashley **Elm Valley** Aces^{2,5} (Ashley before 1952, 192?-63, consolidated into Buckeye Valley)
- **Bellepoint** Bears (192?-52, consolidated into Scioto Valley)
- **Galena** Golden Eagles (192?-50, consolidated into Big Walnut)
- **Harlem** Hawks (192?-50, consolidated into Big Walnut)
- **Hyatts** Hornets (192?-53, consolidated into Olentangy)
- Kilbourne **Brown** Bears(192?-52, consolidated into Elm Valley)
- Lewis Center **Olentangy** Braves^{6} (Lewis Center before 1953, 192?-63, to Mid-Ohio)
- Ostrander **Scioto Valley** Rockets^{7} (Ostrander before 1953, 192?-63, consolidated into Buckeye Valley)
- **Powell** Pirates (192?-53, consolidated into Olentangy)
- **Radnor** Trojans (192?-63, consolidated into Buckeye Valley)
- **Sunbury** Wildcats^{1,3} (192?-50, consolidated into Big Walnut)
- **West Berlin** Warriors (192?-53, consolidated into Olentangy)
- Sunbury **Big Walnut** Golden Eagles^{4,6} (1950–63, to Mid-Ohio)
1. Concurrent with Mid-State League 1946-49.
2. Concurrent with Mid-Buckeye League 1948-53.
3. Concurrent with Mid-Buckeye League 1948-50.
4. Concurrent with Mid-Buckeye League 1950-54
5. Concurrent with Mid-Ohio Conference 1953-63.
6. Concurrent with Mid-Ohio Conference 1954-63.
7. Concurrent with Mid-Ohio Conference 1956-63.

== Franklin County League ==
Organized with the beginning of the state basketball tournament in 1922, the league membership was fairly fluid, as schools left for other regional and power leagues, and often returned again. The league was one that was directly hindered by the creation of the Ohio Capital Conference, as two of its five remaining members left for the league in 1968, and the other schools left to fill in spots in other conferences.

- **Bexley** Lions (1922–29, to Central Buckeye League, 1966–68, to Mid-8 League)
- Gahanna **Columbus Academy** Vikings (1922–49, to Mid-State, 1957-66, to Mid-Buckeye)
- **Canal Winchester** Indians (1922–57, to Mid-State League, 1964–66, to Mid-State League)
- **Dublin** Shamrocks (1922–68, to Metropolitan League)
- Columbus **Franklin Heights** Falcons (1922–58, to South Central Ohio League)
- **Grandview Heights** Bobcats (1922–29, to Central Buckeye League, 1966–68, to Mid-8 League)
- **Grove City** Greyhounds (1922–50, to Mid-6 League)
- **Groveport-Madison** Cruisers (1922–58, to Mid-8 League)
- Columbus **Hamilton Township** Rangers (1922–64, to South Suburban League)
- **Hilliards** Wildcats (1922–50, to Mid-6 League)
- Gahanna **Lincoln** Golden Lions (1922–58, to Mid-8 League)
- Columbus **Mifflin** Cowpunchers (1922–58, to Mid-8 League)
- **New Albany** Eagles (1922–65, to Mid-Buckeye League)
- **Reynoldsburg** Raiders (1922–66, to Metropolitan League)
- **Upper Arlington** Golden Bears (1922–39, to Central Buckeye League, 1966–68, to Central Ohio League)
- **Westerville** Wildcats (1922–26, to Central Ohio League)
- **Whitehall-Yearling** Rams (1922–58, to Central Buckeye League)
- **Worthington** Cardinals (1922–39, to Central Buckeye League, 1945–50, to Mid-6 League, 1966-68, to Ohio Capital Conference)
- **West Jefferson** Roughriders (1963–68, to Metropolitan League)

== Knox County League ==
- **Amity** Aces^{2} (192?-58, consolidated into Mount Vernon)
- **Bladensburg** Blades^{3} (192?-61, to Knox-Morrow)
- **Centerburg** Trojans (192?-48, to Mid-Buckeye League)
- **Danville**^{1} Blue Devils (192?-55, to Mid-Buckeye League)
- **Fredericktown** Freddies (192?-61, to Johnny Appleseed)
- **Gambier** Pirates^{2} (192?-58, consolidated into Mount Vernon)
- **Howard** Bulldogs^{3} (192?-61, to Knox-Morrow)
1. Concurrent with Mid-Buckeye League 1954-55.
2. Concurrent with Knox-Morrow League 1955-58.
3. Concurrent with Knox-Morrow League 1955-61.

== Knox-Morrow League ==
Formed in 1955, this league was formed by smaller schools in the two counties to solve scheduling issues with their dwindling county leagues (which all remained in). The league folded after the 1961-62 school year, as consolidation left only two schools.

- **Amity** Aces^{1} (1955–58, consolidated into Mount Vernon)
- **Bladensburg** Blades^{2} (1955–62, consolidated into Howard)
- **Chesterville** Eagles^{3} (1955–62, consolidated into Highland)
- **Gambier** Pioneers^{1} (1955–58, consolidated into Mount Vernon)
- **Howard** Bulldogs^{2} (1955–62, became East Knox and joined Mid-Buckeye in 1963)
- **Johnsville** Johnnies^{3} (1955–62, rejoined Morrow County League)
- **Marengo** Wildcats^{3} (1955–62, consolidated into Highland)
- **Sparta** Spartans^{3} (1955–60, consolidated into Marengo)
1. Concurrent with KCL throughout membership.
2. Concurrent with KCL until 1961.
3. Concurrent with MCL throughout membership.

== Marion County League ==
- **Caledonia** Scots (pre-1931-62, consolidated into River Valley)
- **Claridon** Hornets (pre-1931-62, consolidated into River Valley)
- **Green Camp** Panthers (pre-1931-62, consolidated into Elgin)
- **Kirkpatrick** Cougars (pre-1931-48, consolidated into Morral)
- **Larue** Indians (pre-1931-62, consolidated into Elgin)
- **Martel** Eagles (pre-1931-62, consolidated into River Valley)
- **Meeker** Trojans (pre-1931-57, consolidated into Ridgedale)
- **Morral** Wildcats (pre-1931-57, consolidated into Ridgedale)
- **New Bloomington** Rams (pre-1931-62, consolidated into Elgin)
- Marion **Pleasant** Pandas (before 1958)/Spartans (pre-1931-69, to North Central)^{1}
- **Prospect** Bulldogs (pre-1931-62, consolidated into Elgin)
- **Waldo** Cardinals (pre-1931-62, consolidated into River Valley)
- Morral **Ridgedale** Rockets (1957–69, to North Central)^{1}
- Green Camp **Elgin** Comets (1962–69, to North Central)^{1}
- Caledonia **River Valley** Vikings (1962–69, to North Central)^{1}
1. Teams played concurrently in the MCL and NCC from 1962 to 1969.

MCL Divisions, pre-1931-48
Eastern	Western
Caledonia	Green Camp
Claridon	LaRue
Kirkpatrick	Meeker
Martel	Morral
Pleasant	New Bloomington
Waldo	Prospect

== Metropolitan League (Columbus Area) ==
This conference started as the South Suburban League in 1964, then changed names as it expanded two years later. Weakened by the beginning of the Ohio Capital Conference in 1968, the conference finally folded in 1977, with the beginning of the second Central Buckeye League.

- Columbus **Franklin Heights** Falcons (1964–77)
- Columbus **Hamilton Township** Rangers (1964–77)
- Grove City **Pleasant View** Panthers (1964–68, to Ohio Capital Conference)
- Ashville **Teays Valley** Vikings (1964–77, to South Central Ohio League)
- **Reynoldsburg** Raiders (1966–68, to Ohio Capital Conference)
- **Whitehall-Yearling** Rams (1966–68, to Ohio Capital Conference)
- **Dublin** Shamrocks (1968–77, to Central Buckeye League)
- **West Jefferson** Roughriders (1968–77, to Central Buckeye League)
- Lewis Center **Olentangy** Braves^{1} (1970–77, to Central Buckeye League)
- **Grandview Heights** Bobcats (1972–77, to Central Buckeye League)
- **Marysville** Monarchs^{1} (1972–77, to Central Buckeye League)
1. Concurrent with both ML and CBL during 1976-77.

== Mid-8 League ==
Was the Mid-6 League 1950-58. This was another league that was weakened by the Ohio Capital Conference's creation (along with the Franklin County League and Metropolitan League), it finally folded six years later.

- **Grove City** Greyhounds (1950–74, to Central Ohio League 1976)
- **Hilliard** Wildcats (1950–74, to Ohio Capital Conference)
- **London** Red Raiders (1950–74, to Central Buckeye Conference)
- **Marysville** Monarchs (1950–72, to Metropolitan League)
- **Westerville** Wildcats (1950–68, to Ohio Capital Conference)
- **Worthington** Cardinals (1950–58, to Franklin County League)
- **Groveport-Madison** Cruisers (1958–74, to Ohio Capital Conference)
- Gahanna **Lincoln** Golden Lions (1958–68, to Ohio Capital Conference)
- Columbus **Mifflin** Cowpunchers (1958–73, to Columbus City League)
- **Bexley** Lions (1968–74, to Central Buckeye League 1976)
- **Grandview Heights** Bobcats (1968–72, to Metropolitan League)

== Mid-Ohio Conference ==
The Mid-Ohio Conference was founded in 1953 and remained a fairly stable league until 1977, when three teams left to join the Central Buckeye League. The league lasted as an eight-team league for much of the rest of their existence until 1990, when the four Morrow County schools left to join the newly formed Mid-Ohio Athletic Conference. Three other teams joined the North Central Conference, while the one other, Marion Catholic, remained independent for a number of years.

- **Cardington-Lincoln** Pirates^{2} (1953–1990, to Mid-Ohio Athletic Conference)
- Ashley **Elm Valley** Aces^{3} (1953–1963, consolidated into Buckeye Valley)
- **Marion Catholic** Fighting Irish (1953–1990, St. Mary until 1957, to Northwest Central Conference 2001)
- **Mount Gilead** Indians^{1} (1953–1990, to Mid-Ohio Athletic Conference)
- **Richwood** Tigers^{1,4} (1953–1965, consolidated into North Union)
- Delaware **Olentangy** Braves^{3} (1954–1970, to Metropolitan League)
- Sunbury **Big Walnut** Golden Eagles^{3,6} (1954–1977, to Central Buckeye League)
- Ostrander **Scioto Valley** Rockets^{3} (1956–1963, consolidated into Buckeye Valley)
- Delaware **Buckeye Valley** Barons (1963–1977, to Central Buckeye League)
- Sparta **Highland** Scots (1963–1990, to Mid-Ohio Athletic Conference)
- Richwood **North Union** Wildcats (1965–1977, to Central Buckeye League)
- Galion **Northmor** Golden Knights (1970–1990, to Mid-Ohio Athletic Conference)
- **Centerburg** Trojans (1977–1981, to Mid-Buckeye Conference)
- **Crestline** Bulldogs (1977–1990, to North Central Conference)
- **Fredericktown** Freddies (1977–1990, to North Central Conference)
- **Loudonville** Redbirds (1981–1984, to Mohican Area 1989)
- **Ontario** Warriors (1983–1990, to North Central Conference)
1. Concurrent with Mid-Buckeye League 1953-54.
2. Concurrent with Morrow County League until 1963.
3. Concurrent with Delaware County League until 1963.
4. Concurrent with Union County League until 1965.
5. Concurrent with Central Buckeye League 1976-77.

== Morrow County League ==
Another of the county-wide small school conferences, the MCL ended in 1963 as two of the three remaining schools went to the Mid-Ohio Conference, where the third would land a few years later.

- **Cardington-Lincoln** Pirates^{1,2} (192?-63, to Mid-Ohio Conference
- **Chesterville** Eagles (192?-62, consolidated into Highland)
- **Edison** Tigers(192?-60, consolidated into Mount Gilead)
- **Iberia** Presidents (192?-63, consolidated into Northmor)
- **Johnsville** Johnnies (192?-63, consolidated into Northmor)
- **Marengo** Wildcats (192?-62, consolidated into Highland)
- **Mount Gilead** Indians (192?-45, to Mid-State League (1945–50))
- **Sparta** Spartans (192?-60, consolidated into Marengo)
- Sparta **Highland** Scots (1962–63, to Mid-Ohio Conference)
1. Concurrent with MCL and Mid-Buckeye League 1948-54.
2. Concurrent with MCL and Mid-Ohio Conference 1953-63.

== Union County League ==
- **Broadway** Bears (192?-50, consolidated into Northwestern)
- **Byhalia-York** Falcons (192?-65, Byhalia before 1950, consolidated into North Union)
- Unionville Center **Darby** Tigers (192?-61, consolidated into Fairbanks)
- New California **Jerome Township** Knights (192?-50, consolidated into Dublin)
- **Magnetic Springs** Resorters (192?-63, consolidated into Richwood)
- **Raymond** Rangers (192?-50, consolidated into Northwestern)
- **Richwood** Tigers^{1,2,3} (192?-65, consolidated into North Union)
- Milford Center **Union** Wolves (192?-61, consolidated into Fairbanks)
- **Watkins** Warriors (192?-50, consolidated into Marysville)
- Somersville **York** Blue Bombers (192?-50, consolidated into Byhalia-York)
- Raymond **Northwestern** Bears (1950–63, consolidated into Marysville)
- Milford Center **Fairbanks** Panthers^{4} (1961–65, to Logan County League)
1. Concurrent with Mid-State League (1945–50) for duration of that league's existence
2. Concurrent with Mid-Buckeye League 1950-54.
3. Concurrent with Mid-Ohio Conference 1953-65.
4. Concurrent with Logan County League 1961-65.

== See also ==
- Ohio High School Athletic Association
- Ohio High School Athletic Conferences
- OHSAA Central Region athletic conferences
