= OHSAA Central Region athletic conferences =

High school athletic conferences

This is a list of high school athletic conferences in the Central Region of Ohio, as defined by the OHSAA. Because the names of localities and their corresponding high schools do not always match and because there is often a possibility of ambiguity with respect to either the name of a locality or the name of a high school, the following table gives both in every case, with the locality name first, in plain type, and the high school name second in boldface type. The school's team nickname is given last.

== Central Buckeye League ==
- **Bexley** Lions (2023–)
- Columbus **Bishop Ready** Silver Knights (2023–)
- Delaware **Buckeye Valley** Barons (2023–)
- Gahanna **Columbus Academy** Vikings (2023–)
- **Columbus School for Girls** Unicorns (No football, 2023–)
- Columbus **Franklin Heights** Falcons (2024– (Football joined in 2025)
- Columbus **Grandview Heights** Bobcats (2023–)
- **Whitehall-Yearling** Rams (2023–)
- **Worthington Christian** Warriors (2023–)

== Central Catholic League ==
- Columbus **Bishop Hartley** Hawks (1957–)
- Columbus **Bishop Watterson** Eagles (1955–)
- Columbus **St. Charles** Cardinals (1923–)
- Columbus **St. Francis DeSales** Stallions (1960–)

Former members

- Columbus **Bishop Ready** Silver Knights (1960–2023, to Central Buckeye League)
- Zanesville **Bishop Rosecrans** Bishops (1950–1977, 1979–2007)
- Springfield **Catholic Central** Fighting Irish (1951–1953)
- Columbus **Columbus School for Girls** Unicorns (1988–2019, to Mid-State League)
- Columbus **Father Wehrle** Wolverines (1966–1991, school closed)
- Columbus **Holy Family** Golden Flashes (1928–1960, consolidated into Father Wehrle)
- Columbus **Holy Rosary** Ramblers (1928–1966, consolidated into Father Wehrle)
- **Newark Catholic** Green Wave (1928–1953 as St. Francis, 1991–2003 to Mid-State League)
- New Lexington **St. Aloysius** Blue Knights (1955–1969, school closed)
- Columbus **St. Mary** Rams (1928–1966, consolidated into Father Wehrle)
- Lancaster **St. Mary** Saints (1951–1953, school closed)
- Marion **St. Mary** Fighting Irish (1951–1953)
- Zanesville **St. Nicholas** Flyers (1928–1950, consolidated into Bishop Rosecrans)
- Zanesville **St. Thomas Aquinas** Irish (1928–1944, 1946–1950, consolidated into Bishop Rosecrans)
- Mount Vernon **St. Vincent de Paul** Blue Streaks (1928–1953, school closed)
- Columbus **Worthington Christian** Warriors (2007–2013)

== Columbus City League ==
North Division

- Columbus **Beechcroft** Cougars (1976–)
- Columbus **Centennial** Stars (1976–)
- Columbus **East** Tigers (1924–)
- Columbus **Linden McKinley** Panthers (1928–)
- Columbus **Mifflin** Punchers (1973–)
- Columbus **North International** Lions (2010–)
- Columbus **Northland** Vikings (1965–)
- Columbus **Whetstone** Braves (1961–)

South Division

- Columbus **Africentric** Nubians (1999–)
- Columbus **Briggs** Bruins (1962–)
- Columbus **Eastmoor Academy** Warriors (1956–)
- Columbus **Independence** 76ers (1976–)
- Columbus **Marion-Franklin** Red Devils (1958–)
- Columbus **South** Bulldogs (1922–)
- Columbus **Walnut Ridge** Scots (1961–)
- Columbus **West** Cowboys (1922–)

=== Former members ===
- Columbus **Aquinas College** Terriers (1922–1965, closed)
- Columbus **Brookhaven** Bearcats (1963–2014, closed)
- Columbus **Central** Pirates (1922–1982, closed)
- Columbus **Mohawk** Indians (1967–1978, closed)
- Columbus **North** Polar Bears (1924–1979, closed)

== Knox-Morrow Athletic Conference ==
Started in 2017-18, the league was founded by members of the Mid-Ohio Athletic Conference's Blue Division.

- **Cardington-Lincoln** Pirates (2017–)
- **Centerburg** Trojans (2017–)
- **Danville** Blue Devils (2017–)
- Howard **East Knox** Bulldogs (2017–)
- **Fredericktown** Freddies (2017–)
- **Loudonville** Redbirds (2022–)
- **Mount Gilead** Indians (2017–)
- Galion **Northmor** Golden Knights (2017–)

Former Member

- Sparta **Highland** Fighting Scots (2017–2021)

== Licking County League ==
The league has two incarnations, the first lasting from 1927 to 1991. The second incarnation began 23 years later after travel and budget concerns brought together the ten schools that had made up league membership until 1986. The league is split into two divisions - Buckeye and Cardinal divisions.

Buckeye

- **Granville** Blue Aces (1927–1950, 1963–1991, 2013–)
- Pataskala **Licking Heights** Hornets (formerly Summit Station) (1927–1983, 2013–)
- Newark **Licking Valley** Panthers (1959–1991, 2013–)
- **Mount Vernon** Yellow Jackets (2024–)
- Pataskala **Watkins Memorial** Warriors (1955–1991, 2013–)
- **Zanesville** Blue Devils (2020–)

Cardinal

- **Heath** Bulldogs (1964–1991, 2013–)
- **Johnstown-Monroe** Johnnies (1927–1991, 2013–)
- Hebron **Lakewood** Lancers (1959–1991, 2013–)
- **Newark Catholic** Green Wave (1973–1991, 2013–)
- Johnstown **Northridge** Vikings (1963–1986, 2013–)
- **Utica** Redskins (1927–1991, 2013–)

Former members

- **Alexandria** Red Devils (1927–1962, consolidated into Northridge )
- **Etna** Eagles (1927–1955, consolidated into Watkins Memorial)
- **Hanover** Panthers (1927–1959, renamed Hanover-Toboso 1934, consolidated into Licking Valley)
- **Hartford** Yellow Jackets (1927–1960, consolidated into Northridge North)
- **Hebron** Trailblazers (1927–1958, consolidated into Lynnwood-Jacksontown)
- **Homer** Blue Devils (1927–1962, renamed Northridge North in 1960, consolidated into Northridge)
- **Jacksontown** Trojans (1927–1959, renamed Lynnwood-Jacksontown in 1958, consolidated into Lakewood)
- **Kirkersville** Komets (1927–1955, consolidated into Watkins Memorial)
- **Pataskala** Blue Streaks (1927–1955, consolidated into Watkins Memorial)
- **Toboso** (1927–1934, consolidated into Hanover-Toboso)

== Mid-Ohio Athletic Conference ==
- Bellville **Clear Fork** Colts (2017–)
- **Galion** Tigers (2014–)
- Sparta **Highland** Fighting Scots (1990–2017, 2021–)
- **Marion Harding** Presidents (2014 all sports, 2015 football)
- **Ontario** Warriors (2017–)
- Marion **Pleasant** Spartans (1990–)
- Caledonia **River Valley** Vikings (1990–)
- **Shelby** Whippets (2018–)

=== Former members ===
- **Cardington-Lincoln** Pirates (1990–2017, to Knox-Morrow Conference)
- **Centerburg** Trojans (2013–17, to Knox-Morrow Conference)
- Howard **East Knox** Bulldogs (2014–17, to Knox-Morrow Conference)
- Marion **Elgin** Comets (1990–2017, to Northwest Central Conference)
- Milford Center **Fairbanks** Panthers (2013–17, to Ohio Heritage Conference)
- **Fredericktown** Freddies (2013–17, to Knox-Morrow Conference)
- Plain City **Jonathan Alder** Pioneers (2013–17, to Central Buckeye Conference)
- **Mount Gilead** Indians (1990–2017, to Knox-Morrow Conference)
- Richwood **North Union** Wildcats (1990–2018, to Central Buckeye Conference, football competed in MOAC for 2018 season)
- Galion **Northmor** Golden Knights (1990–2017, to Knox-Morrow Conference)
- Morral **Ridgedale** Rockets (1990–2014)
- **Upper Sandusky** Rams (2014 football season only)
- Delaware **Buckeye Valley** Barons (1990–2019, to Mid-State League)

== Mid-Ohio Christian Athletic League ==
- **Delaware Christian** Eagles
- **Granville Christian Academy** Lions
- Pataskala **Liberty Christian** Eagles
- Groveport **Madison Christian** Eagles
- Westerville **Northside Christian** Lions
- Plain City **Shekinah Christian** Flames
- Columbus **Tree of Life Christian** Trojans

Former members

- Lancaster **Fairfield Christian Academy** Knights
- **Gahanna Christian Academy** Eagles
- **Grove City Christian** Eagles
- Columbus **Maranatha Christian** Patriots

== Mid-State League ==
Buckeye Division

- Amanda **Amanda-Clearcreek** Aces (1958–)
- Carroll **Bloom-Carroll** Bulldogs, formerly Carroll (1958–)
- **Circleville** Tigers (1990–)
- Lancaster **Fairfield Union** Falcons (1957–)
- Columbus **Hamilton Township** Rangers (1981–)
- Baltimore **Liberty Union** Lions (1949–)
- Circleville **Logan Elm** Braves (1973–)

Cardinal Division

- Sugar Grove **Berne Union** Rockets (1953–)
- Zanesville **Bishop Rosecrans** Bishops (2017–)
- Lancaster **Fairfield Christian Academy** Knights (2013–)
- Lancaster **Fisher Catholic** Irish (1964–)
- **Grove City Christian** Eagles (2013–)
- Canal Winchester **Harvest Preparatory** Warriors (2003–)
- Corning **Miller** Falcons (2020–)
- **Millersport** Lakers (1957–)
- Upper Arlington **The Wellington School** Jaguars (2017–) (No football)

Future members - Buckeye Division

- **Logan** Chieftains (joining 2027 or 2028)

Former members

- **Bexley** Lions (2003–2023, to Central Buckeye League)
- Columbus **Bishop Ready** Silver Knights (2017–2023, to Central Buckeye League) (Football only)
- Delaware **Buckeye Valley** Barons (2019–2023, to Central Buckeye League)
- **Canal Winchester** Indians (1957–1964, 1966–2012, to Ohio Capital Conference)
- Gahanna **Columbus Academy** Vikings (1949–1957, 2003–2023, to Central Buckeye League)
- **Columbus School for Girls** Unicorns (2019–2023, to Central Buckeye League)
- **Grandview Heights** Bobcats (2003–2023, to Central Buckeye League)
- **Granville** Blue Aces (1991–2013, to Licking County League)
- **Heath** Bulldogs (1991–2013, to Licking County League)
- Hebron **Lakewood** Lancers (2003–2013, to Licking County League)
- Pataskala **Licking Heights** Hornets (1984–2012, to Licking County League)
- Newark **Licking Valley** Panthers (2003–2013, to Licking County League)
- **London** Red Raiders (2013–2019, to Central Buckeye Conference)
- London **Madison-Plains** Golden Eagles (2013–2017 to Ohio Heritage Conference)
- **New Albany** Eagles (1990–2006, to Ohio Capital Conference)
- **Newark Catholic** Green Wave (2003–2013, to Licking County League)
- **Pickerington** Tigers (1966–1981, to Ohio Capital Conference)
- Ashville **Teays Valley** Vikings (1984–2024, to Ohio Capital Conference)
- **West Jefferson** Roughriders (1949–1956, 2006–2017 to Ohio Heritage Conference)
- **Whitehall-Yearling** Rams (2003–2023, to Central Buckeye League )
- **Worthington Christian** Warriors (2013–2023, to Central Buckeye League)

== Ohio Capital Conference ==
Conference alignment beginning 2024

Ohio Division

- Grove City **Central Crossing** Comets (2002–)
- **Gahanna Lincoln** Golden Lions (1968–)
- **Grove City** Greyhounds (1981–)
- **New Albany** Eagles (2006–)
- **Pickerington North** Panthers (2004–)
- **Westerville Central** Warhawks (2004–)

Central Division

- **Dublin Coffman** Shamrocks (1991–)
- **Hilliard Bradley** Jaguars (2009–)
- **Hilliard Davidson** Wildcats (1974–)
- Lewis Center **Olentangy Orange** Pioneers (2008–)
- Powell **Olentangy Liberty** Patriots (2004–)
- **Upper Arlington** Golden Bears (1981–)

Buckeye Division

- **Canal Winchester** Indians (2013–)
- **Groveport-Madison** Cruisers (1974–)
- **Lancaster** Golden Gales (1997–)
- **Logan** Chieftains (2024–2027/2028)
- **Newark** Wildcats (1995–)
- **Pickerington Central** Tigers (1981–)
- **Reynoldsburg** Raiders (1968–)
- Ashville **Teays Valley** Vikings (2024–)

Cardinal Division

- **Dublin Jerome** Celtics (2004–)
- **Hilliard Darby** Panthers (1997–)
- Lewis Center **Olentangy** Braves (1997–)
- Delaware **Olentangy Berlin** Bears (2018–)
- **Marysville** Monarchs (1991–)
- Worthington **Thomas Worthington** Cardinals (1968–)

Capital Division

- Sunbury **Big Walnut** Golden Eagles (1997–)
- **Delaware Hayes** Pacers (1968–)
- **Dublin Scioto** Irish (1995–)
- **Westerville North** Warriors (1977–)
- **Westerville South** Wildcats (1968–)
- Galloway **Westland** Cougars (1970–)
- Columbus **Worthington Kilbourne** Wolves (1991–)

Former Members

- **Chillicothe** Cavaliers (1976–2006 to Southeast Ohio Athletic League).
- Columbus **Franklin Heights** Falcons (1981-2024 to Central Buckeye League)
- **Mount Vernon** Yellow Jackets (1968–2016 to Ohio Cardinal Conference).
- Grove City **Pleasant View** Panthers (1968–1970 consolidated to Westland)
- Pataskala **Watkins Memorial** Warriors (1989–2013 to Licking County League)
- **Whitehall-Yearling** Rams (1968–2001 to Mid-State League).

== See also ==
- Ohio High School Athletic Association
