= BRHS =

BRHS may stand for:

- Braden River High School in Bradenton, Florida
- Billy Ryan High School in Denton, Texas
- Bishop Ready High School (Columbus, Ohio)
- Bridgewater-Raritan High School in Bridgewater Township, New Jersey
- Buena Regional High School in Buena, New Jersey
- Broad Run High School in Ashburn, Virginia
- Ballantyne Ridge High School in Charlotte, North Carolina
