= Heath High School =

Heath High School may refer to:

- Heath High School (Kentucky) in West Paducah, Kentucky
- Heath High School (Ohio) in Heath, Ohio
- Rockwall-Heath High School in Heath, Texas
