= Utica High School =

Utica High School may refer to:

- Utica High School (Michigan)
- Utica High School (Ohio)
