= Miller High School =

Miller High School may refer to:

United States

- Miller High School (Michigan)
- Miller High School (Miller, Missouri)
- Miller High School (Corning, Ohio)
- Miller High School (Corpus Christi, Texas)

Canada

- Miller Comprehensive High School; Regina, Saskatchewan

== See also ==
- A. B. Miller High School in Fontana, California
- Kelly Miller High School in Clarksburg, West Virginia (defunct)
- T. R. Miller High School in Brewton, Alabama
