= Northridge High School (Johnstown, Ohio) =

Location
- 6066 Johnstown Utica Road North; Johnstown, (Licking County), Ohio 43031; United States; 40°11′15″N 82°36′27″W

Information
- Type: Public, Coeducational high school
- Superintendent: Scott Schmitt
- Principal: Rebecca Brechbill
- Teaching staff: 20.63 (FTE)
- Grades: 9-12
- Enrollment: 351 (2024-25)
- Student to teacher ratio: 17.01
- Colors: Emerald Green and Snowy White
- Athletics: Division V
- Athletics conference: Licking County League
- Team name: Vikings
- Athletic Director: Justin Grieger
- Website: northridge.k12.oh.us

Northridge High School is a public high school in Johnstown, Ohio. It is located in rural northwestern Licking County, Ohio, and serves several townships in that part of the county, as well as a part of southern Knox County, Ohio.

The original High School is now Alexandria Elementary. After moving from the current elementary, the High School was moved to what is now the current middle school building. Today, both the middle school and high school are in the same building, but fairly separated. As of beginning of the school year 2008, 4th and 5th grade students are attending school in the Intermediate on the campus of the High School.

The school's mascot is the Northridge Viking.

== Sports ==
Northridge High School is a member of the Licking County League, one of the nine currently functioning members of the OHSAA Central Region athletic conferences

The Vikings have a rivalry with the Johnstown Johnnies.
