= Licking Valley =

Licking Valley may refer to:

- Licking Valley High School, a public high school in Hanover, Ohio
- Licking Valley Campus, a campus of Maysville Community and Technical College in Cynthiana, Kentucky
- Licking Valley, the watershed of the Licking River in Kentucky
- Licking Valley, the watershed of the Licking River in Ohio
