= Granville High School =

Public school in Granville, Ohio, US

Location
- 248 New Burg Street; Granville, Ohio 43023; United States; 40°4′44″N 82°31′38″W

Information
- Type: Public high school
- School district: Granville Exempted Village School District
- Superintendent: Jeff Brown
- Principal: Scott Hinton
- Teaching staff: 40.64 (FTE)
- Grades: 9–12
- Enrollment: 845 (2024–25)
- Student to teacher ratio: 20.79
- Colors: Navy and White
- Athletics conference: Licking County League
- Sports: Basketball, football, baseball, lacrosse, volleyball, cross-country, track and field, tennis, softball, soccer, field hockey, bowling, swimming, wrestling, marching band
- Nickname: Blue Aces
- Rival: Licking Valley High School
- Website: School website

Granville High School is a four-year comprehensive public high school located in Granville, Ohio. It is accredited by the State of Ohio Department of Education. The school is a member of the Licking County League.

== State championships ==
- Boys Golf – 1996, 2001
- Girls Cross Country – 2014, 2022
- Girls Softball – 2015

== Notable alumni ==
- Scott McMullen (born 1980), quarterback in the Arena Football League
- Lea Ann Parsley (born 1968), Olympic skeleton racer
- Scott Ryan (born 1965), member of the Ohio House of Representatives
- John Tavener (1921–1993), inductee of the College Football Hall of Fame
