= Grove City Christian School =

Location
- 4750 Hoover Road; Grove City, (Franklin County), Ohio 43123; United States
- 39°51′58″N 83°4′10″W

Information
- Type: Private high school
- Religious affiliation: Church of Nazarene
- Established: 1990
- Chairperson: Angi McClish
- Principal: Jim McMillan
- Head of school: Kacey Chambers
- Faculty: 52
- Grades: K–12
- Student to teacher ratio: 12:1
- Colors: Blue and White
- Athletics conference: Mid-State League
- Mascot: Eagle
- Team name: Eagles
- Website: http://www.grovecitychristian.org

Grove City Christian School is a private, Christian high school in Grove City, Ohio.

== Background ==
Grove City Christian School opened in 1990.
