= Hebron, Ohio =

- Village
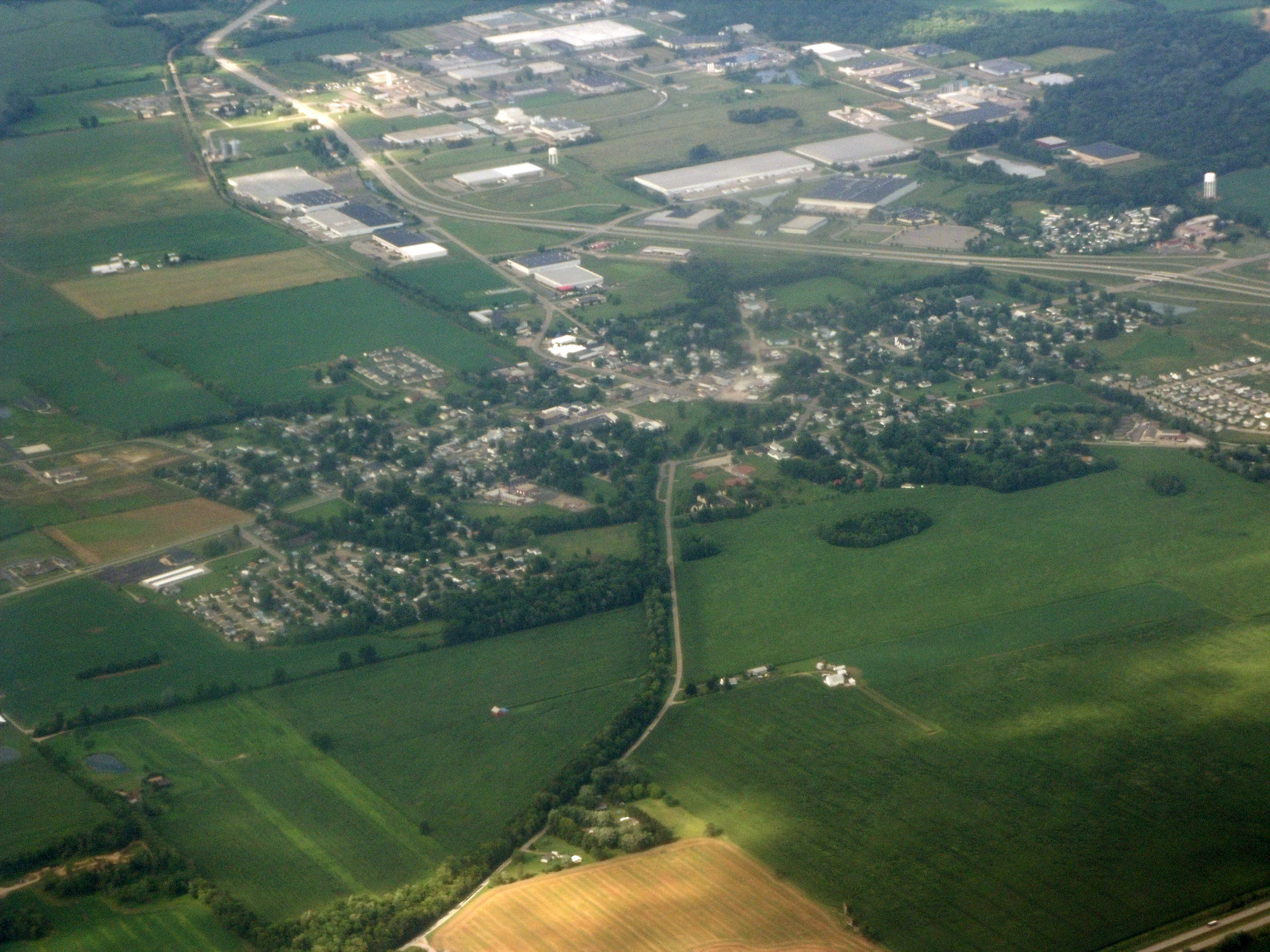
- Aerial photograph of Hebron

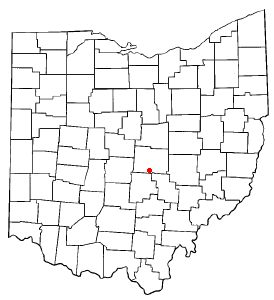
- Location of Hebron, Ohio

- Location of Hebron in Licking County
- Coordinates: 39°57′48″N 82°29′45″W
- Country: United States
- State: Ohio
- County: Licking

Area
  - Total: 2.97 sq mi (7.68 km^{2})
  - Land: 2.96 sq mi (7.67 km^{2})
  - Water: 0.0039 sq mi (0.01 km^{2})
- Elevation: 889 ft (271 m)

Population (2020)
  - Total: 2,326
  - Estimate (2023): 2,384
  - Density: 785.4/sq mi (303.26/km^{2})
- Time zone: UTC-5 (Eastern (EST))
  - Summer (DST): UTC-4 (EDT)
- ZIP codes: 43025, 43098
- Area code: 740
- FIPS code: 39-34790
- GNIS feature ID: 2398481
- Website: https://www.hebronvillage.org/

Hebron (/ˈhiːbrən/ HEE-brən) is a village in Licking County, Ohio, United States. The population was 2,326 at the 2020 census.

== History ==
On September 8, 2022, Hebron withdrew from Union Township, forming a coextensive paper township named Hebron Township.

== Geography ==
According to the United States Census Bureau, the village has a total area of 3.07 square miles (7.95 km^{2}), all land.

== Demographics ==
Historical population
Census	Pop.	Note	%±
1830	84		—
1840	473		463.1%
1850	649		37.2%
1860	494		−23.9%
1870	478		−3.2%
1880	489		2.3%
1890	415		−15.1%
1900	455		9.6%
1910	677		48.8%
1920	683		0.9%
1930	757		10.8%
1940	723		−4.5%
1950	864		19.5%
1960	1,260		45.8%
1970	1,699		34.8%
1980	2,035		19.8%
1990	2,076		2.0%
2000	2,034		−2.0%
2010	2,336		14.8%
2020	2,326		−0.4%
2023 (est.)	2,384	▲	2.5%
U.S. Decennial Census

=== 2010 census ===
As of the census of 2010, there were 2,336 people, 979 households, and 626 families living in the village. The population density was 760.9 inhabitants per square mile (293.8/km^{2}). There were 1,086 housing units at an average density of 353.7 per square mile (136.6/km^{2}). The racial makeup of the village was 96.4% White, 0.4% African American, 0.3% Native American, 0.5% Asian, 0.2% Pacific Islander, 0.2% from other races, and 2.0% from two or more races. Hispanic or Latino of any race were 1.7% of the population.

There were 979 households, of which 33.8% had children under the age of 18 living with them, 43.5% were married couples living together, 14.7% had a female householder with no husband present, 5.7% had a male householder with no wife present, and 36.1% were non-families. 31.5% of all households were made up of individuals, and 13.1% had someone living alone who was 65 years of age or older. The average household size was 2.39 and the average family size was 2.96.

The median age in the village was 36.9 years. 25.4% of residents were under the age of 18; 9.4% were between the ages of 18 and 24; 25.8% were from 25 to 44; 25.8% were from 45 to 64; and 13.7% were 65 years of age or older. The gender makeup of the village was 46.8% male and 53.2% female.

=== 2000 census ===
As of the census of 2000, there were 2,034 people, 882 households, and 553 families living in the village. The population density was 758.2 inhabitants per square mile (292.7/km^{2}). There were 924 housing units at an average density of 344.4 per square mile (133.0/km^{2}). The racial makeup of the village was 97.49% White, 0.20% African American, 0.29% Native American, 0.54% Asian, 0.05% Pacific Islander, 0.49% from other races, and 0.93% from two or more races. Hispanic or Latino of any race were 1.18% of the population.

There were 882 households, out of which 31.3% had children under the age of 18 living with them, 44.4% were married couples living together, 13.5% had a female householder with no husband present, and 37.3% were non-families. 32.1% of all households were made up of individuals, and 14.2% had someone living alone who was 65 years of age or older. The average household size was 2.31 and the average family size was 2.92.

In the village, the population was spread out, with 25.7% under the age of 18, 7.7% from 18 to 24, 32.0% from 25 to 44, 21.5% from 45 to 64, and 13.1% who were 65 years of age or older. The median age was 36 years. For every 100 females there were 86.4 males. For every 100 females age 18 and over, there were 86.4 males.

The median income for a household in the village was $32,031, and the median income for a family was $42,109. Males had a median income of $34,327 versus $24,000 for females. The per capita income for the village was $16,420. About 8.7% of families and 9.5% of the population were below the poverty line, including 11.6% of those under age 18 and 10.2% of those age 65 or over.

== Education ==
Lakewood Local School District operates five public schools, including Lakewood High School.

Hebron has a public library, a branch of the Licking County Library System.
