= Todd Londot =

American gridiron football player (born 1983)

No. 62
- Position: Offensive lineman

Personal information
- Born: April 4, 1983 (age 43); Utica, Ohio, U.S.
- Listed height: 6 ft 7 in (2.01 m)
- Listed weight: 300 lb (136 kg)

Career information
- College: Miami (OH)
- NFL draft: 2006: undrafted

Career history
- New York Giants (2006–2008); Hamilton Tiger-Cats (2009)*
- * Offseason or practice squad member only

Awards and highlights
- Super Bowl champion (XLII); 3× All-MAC (2003–2005)

Todd Londot (born April 4, 1983) is a former professional American and Canadian football offensive lineman. He was signed by the New York Giants as an undrafted free agent in 2005. He played college football at Miami (Ohio). Londot was also a member of the Hamilton Tiger-Cats.
