= Lea Ann Parsley =

American skeleton racer

Personal information
- Born: June 12, 1968 (age 58) Logan, West Virginia, U.S.
Medal record
Women's skeleton
Representing United States
Olympic Games
Silver medal – second place	2002 Salt Lake City	Women

Lea Ann Parsley (born June 12, 1968) is a retired American skeleton racer from Granville, Ohio. She was the first female skeleton athlete to win a world cup medal for the United States and earned a silver medal in the women's skeleton event, a first in Olympic history, during the 2002 Salt Lake City Olympic Winter Games. She was also one of eight athletes chosen to carry the World Trade Center flag into the Opening Ceremony of the 2002 Winter Olympics.

== Biography ==
=== Personal life ===
Parsley was born in Logan, West Virginia and is a descendant of the McCoy family of the famous Hatfield-McCoy feud. She grew up in Granville, Ohio where she served as a volunteer firefighter for 20 years and was inducted into the Granville High School Athletic Hall of Fame.

=== Athletic career ===
==== Collegiate ====
Parsley was a two sport scholarship athlete at Marshall University competing in basketball and track and field. As a basketball player she was named second team All-Southern Conference, led the nation in free throw percentage her senior year and is one of only 14 female players in school history to score over 1,000 points. In addition she was All-Southern Conference in high jump and javelin and held the school record in the javelin. For her efforts on and off the field, she was twice named the Marshall University Female Athlete of the Year and was inducted into the Marshall University Athletic Hall of Fame in 2002.

==== Olympic ====
In 1998 she earned a position on the U.S. National Skeleton Team and competed for six years on the international world cup circuit. Her 1999 second-place finish in Norway was the first-ever women’s world cup medal for the United States Bobsled and Skeleton Federation and she went on to earn a total of seven world cup medals along with numerous top 6 finishes. She placed fourth at the 2000 Goodwill Games, was the 2004 US National Champion and the silver medalist at the 2002 Salt Lake City Olympic Games.

Her career ended as she attempted to qualify for the 2006 Winter Olympics in Turin. She and several other teammates were struck by a runaway bobsled during a training session in Calgary Canada on October 19, 2005. The bobsled, which failed to brake after crossing the finish line, ejected out the end of the track and struck Parsley and teammate Noelle Pikus-Pace. Pikus-Pace, who was the reigning overall world cup leader at the time, suffered a compound fracture of her right leg that took her out of the running for a 2006 Olympic bid as well. Parsley suffered soft-tissue injuries to her right leg that severely hampered her ability to compete in the US team trials less than 72 hours after the accident. She stayed with the team however as an assistant coach and was part of the 2006 US Olympic Skeleton Team coaching staff.

=== Firefighting career ===
Parsley began working as a volunteer firefighter in 1985 and earned top graduate honors from the Ohio Fire Academy as a professional firefighter cadet in 1995. She was named the State of Ohio Firefighter of the Year in 1999 for her part in the rescue of a mother and daughter during a residential house fire. During her career as a structural firefighter, she served the Licking County Ohio area as a member of the Specialized Rescue Team, Hazardous Materials Response Team and the Licking County Honor Guard. She is currently a member of the Ohio Interagency Wild Fire Crew.

=== Academic career ===
While attending Marshall University Parsley earned a bachelor of science degree in adult health education (1990) and later earned a second bachelor's degree from the University of Virginia (1992) in nursing. In 1994 she received a master's degree in nursing from The Ohio State University and went on to complete her doctoral degree in community nursing in 2003.
