= Lakewood Local School District =

School district in Ohio

Location
- Hebron, Ohio United States

District information
- Superintendent: Scott Coffey

Students and staff
- District mascot: Lancers

Other information
- Website: www.lakewoodlocal.k12.oh.us

The Lakewood Local School District, also known as Lakewood Local Schools, is a public school district serving Hebron in Licking County, Ohio.

== Schools ==
- Lakewood High School
- Lakewood Middle School
- Jackson Intermediate School
- Hebron Elementary
- Lakewood Digital Academy
