= Miller High School (Corning, Ohio) =

- 10397 SR 155 SE, Hemlock, Ohio 43730; United States

Information
- Type: Public School
- Established: 1964
- School district: Southern Local School District
- Superintendent: Annette Losco
- Principal: Anthony Losco
- Teaching staff: 23.00 (on an FTE basis)
- Grades: 7-12
- Enrollment: 240 (2024–2025)
- Student to teacher ratio: 10.43
- Colors: Purple and white
- Athletics: Boys: Football, Baseball, Basketball, and Track. Girls: Volleyball, Softball, Basketball, Track, and Cheerleading
- Athletics conference: Mid-State League-Cardinal Division
- Mascot: Falcons
- Website: www.southernlocal.org/schools/miller-high-school

Miller High School (MHS) is a public high school located in Hemlock, Ohio. Named after doctors Bob and Jim Miller, MHS opened in January 1964. It is the only secondary institution in the Southern Local School District, which was formed in 1961 with the consolidation of Central School(Hemlock), Corning, Shawnee, Moxahala, and New Straitsville School Districts. The home of the Falcons, Miller High School's official colors are purple and white. In 1993, a new building project established the Miller Middle School and the Millcreek Elementary School on the same premises as Miller High School, bringing the entire campus under one roof.

== Athletics ==
The Falcons belong to the Ohio High School Athletic Association (OHSAA) and were formerly members of the Tri-Valley Conference. In 2020, Miller joined the Mid-State League's Cardinal Division.

== See also ==
- Ohio High School Athletic Conferences
