= Fairfield Christian Academy =

Location
- 1965 North Columbus Street; Lancaster, Ohio 43130; United States; 39°44′10″N 82°37′14″W

Information
- Type: Private, Coeducational high school
- Denomination: Nondenominational
- Established: 1998
- Superintendent: Craig Carpenter
- CEEB code: 362879
- Principal: Craig Carpenter (high school)
- Grades: PK–12
- Colors: Red and Blue and (White) ( )
- Athletics: OHSAA Division 4
- Athletics conference: Mid-State League (OHSAA) - Cardinal
- Mascot: Knight
- Website: fairfieldchristianacademy.com

Fairfield Christian Academy is a private Christian school in Lancaster, Ohio. Established in 1998, the school serves students from preschool to twelfth grade.

== History ==
Fairfield Christian Academy was founded in 1998 as a ministry of Fairfield Christian Church in Lancaster, Ohio, a historical community 25 miles southeast of Columbus in Fairfield County. The school opened its doors to approximately 200 students and 20 faculty. Today the school has approximately 500 students in preschool through high school with over 80 faculty and staff.

The school is accredited by Association of Christian Schools International.

== Extracurricular activities ==
Student groups and activities include Academic Quiz Team, Media Team, Ski Club, National Art Society, Ecology Club, Mu Alpha Theta, National Honor Society, National Junior Honor Society, and Spanish club. The school's athletic teams, known as the Knights, compete in Ohio High School Athletic Association Division 4 in the Mid-State League. The school currently fields teams in archery, baseball, basketball, cheerleading, football, golf, softball, track and field, cross-country, and volleyball.
