= Heath High School (Ohio) =

Public, coeducational high school in Heath, Ohio, United States

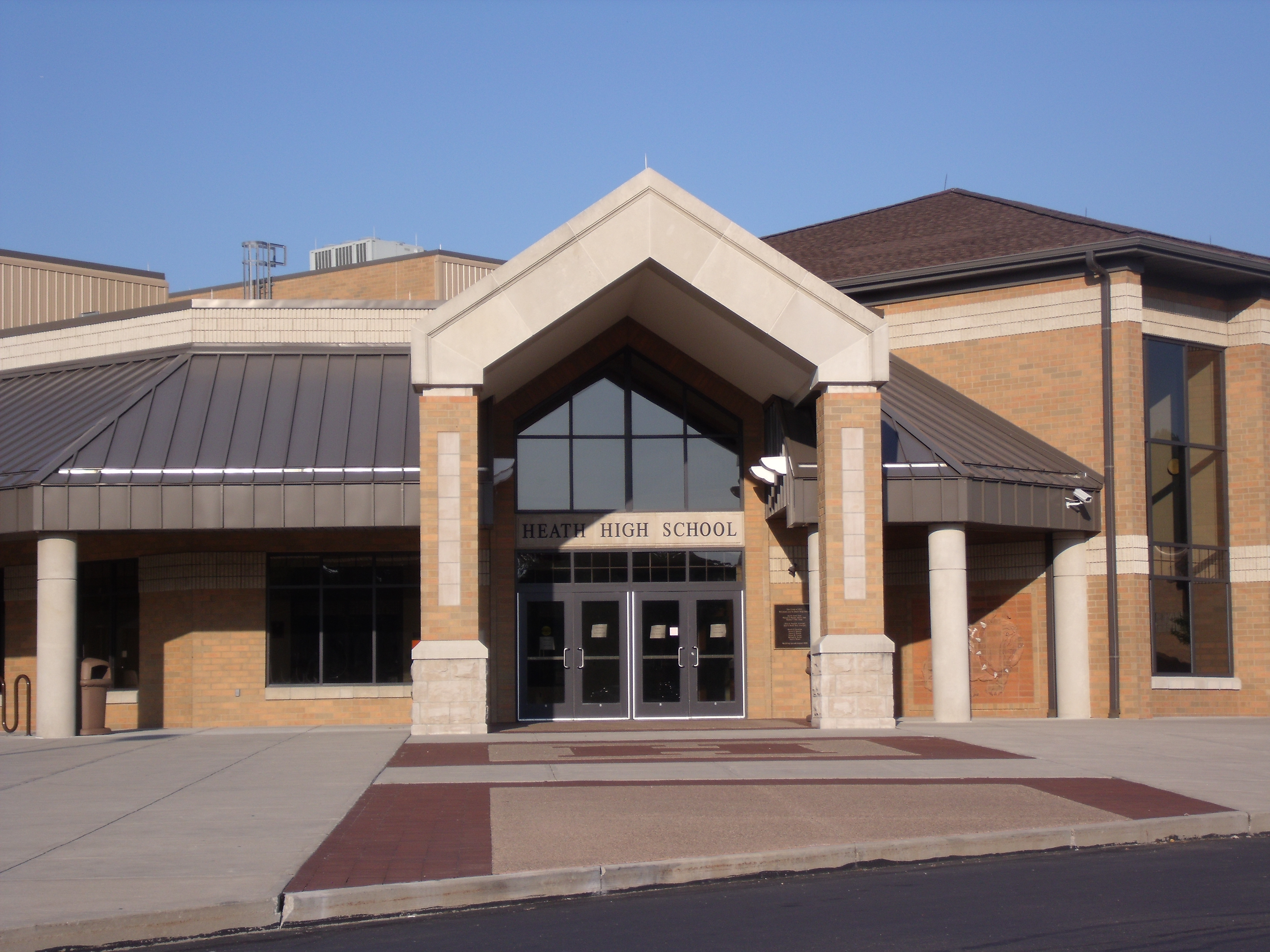

Location
- 300 Licking View Drive; Heath, (Licking County), Ohio 43056; United States; 40°1′37″N 82°25′57″W

Information
- Type: Public, Coeducational high school
- Established: 1962
- School district: Heath City School District
- Superintendent: Trevor Thomas
- Principal: Kat Fields
- Teaching staff: 31.00 (FTE)
- Grades: 9-12
- Enrollment: 447 (2024-25)
- Student to teacher ratio: 14.42
- Colors: Orange, Brown, and White
- Slogan: Ensuring all students learn and grow is our collective responsibility.
- Fight song: Washington and Lee Swing
- Athletics conference: Licking County League
- Mascot: Bulldog, alternate- Heath Leaf's circa 2016
- Team name: Bulldogs
- Accreditation: North Central Association of Colleges and Schools
- Yearbook: Erica
- Athletic Director: Bo Hansen
- Website: www.heath.k12.oh.us

Heath High School is a public high school in Heath, Ohio. It is the only high school in the Heath City Schools district that was founded in 1962.

== Athletics ==
The Heath High School Bulldogs compete in the Licking County League.

The Heath Bulldogs compete in Baseball, Basketball, Bowling, Cheerleading, Cross Country, Football, Golf, Soccer, Softball, Swimming, Track & Field, Volleyball, and Wrestling.

== Ohio High School Athletic Association State Championships ==
- Boys Baseball – 2002, 2007, 2024
- Boys Track and Field - 2007
- Girls Basketball – 1991
- Girls Volleyball – 1995

=== Other Non-OHSAA State Championships ===
- Coed Cheerleading — 2017
