= Notre Dame Academy (Toledo, Ohio) =

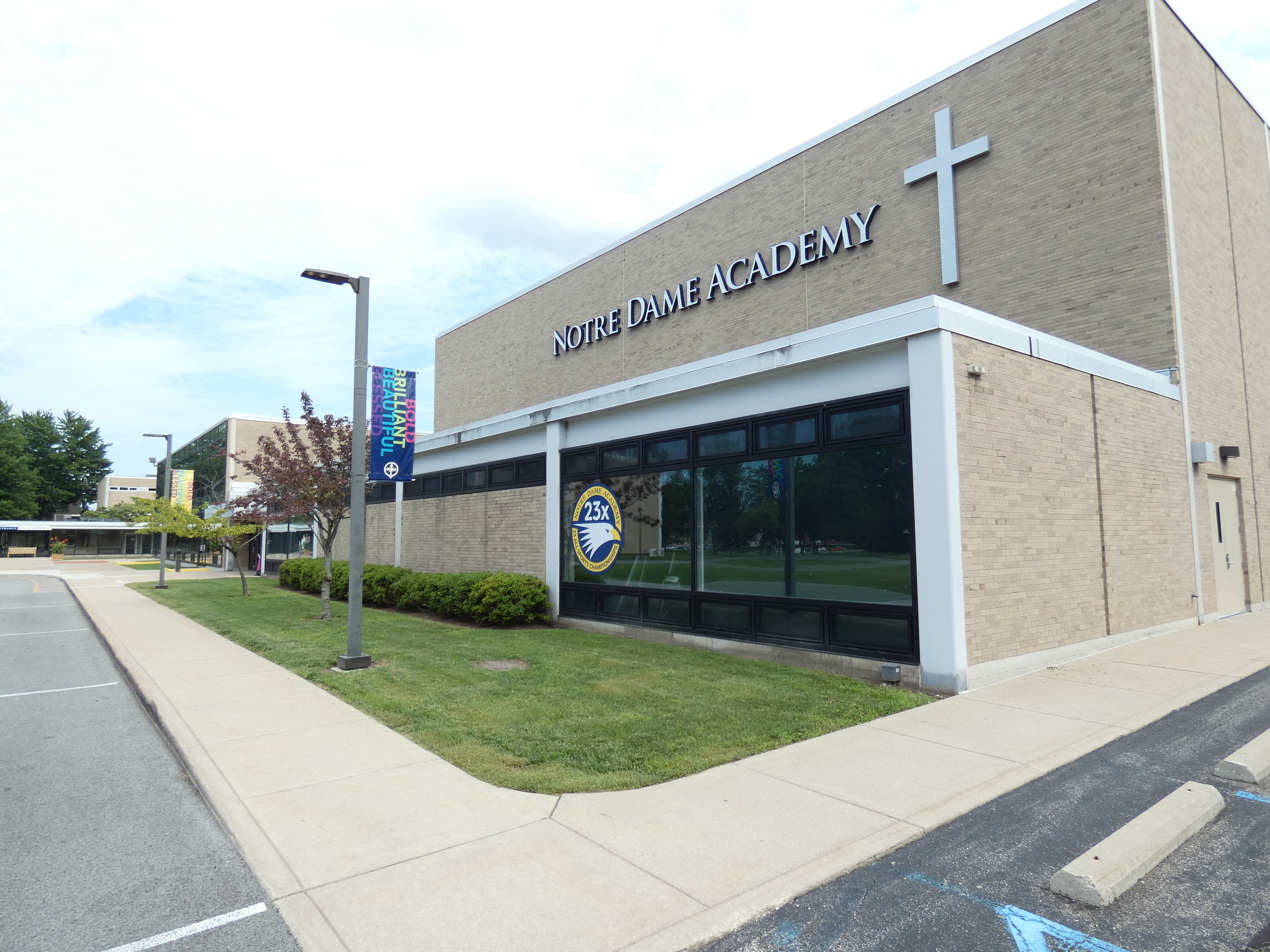
- Front portion of the school

Location
- 3535 West Sylvania Avenue; Toledo, (Lucas County), Ohio 43623; United States; 41°41′25″N 83°37′45″W

Information
- Type: Private
- Religious affiliation: Roman Catholic
- Established: 1904
- President: Kim Grilliot
- Chairman: Ms. Jennifer Benedict
- Dean: Mrs. Jessica Beaverson
- Principal: Andrea Zimmerman
- Grades: Sixth [6] through Twelfth [12] grade
- Gender: Girls
- Enrollment: 627
- Colors: Navy & Gold
- Athletics: Catholic High School League
- Mascot: Eagle
- Accreditation: Ohio Catholic Schools Accrediting Association
- Newspaper: The Vista
- Yearbook: Regina
- Tuition: $13,844
- Affiliations: Roman Catholic Diocese of Toledo, Sisters of Notre Dame
- Alumni: 9,500
- Athletic Director: Mr. Gary Snyder
- Website: http://www.nda.org

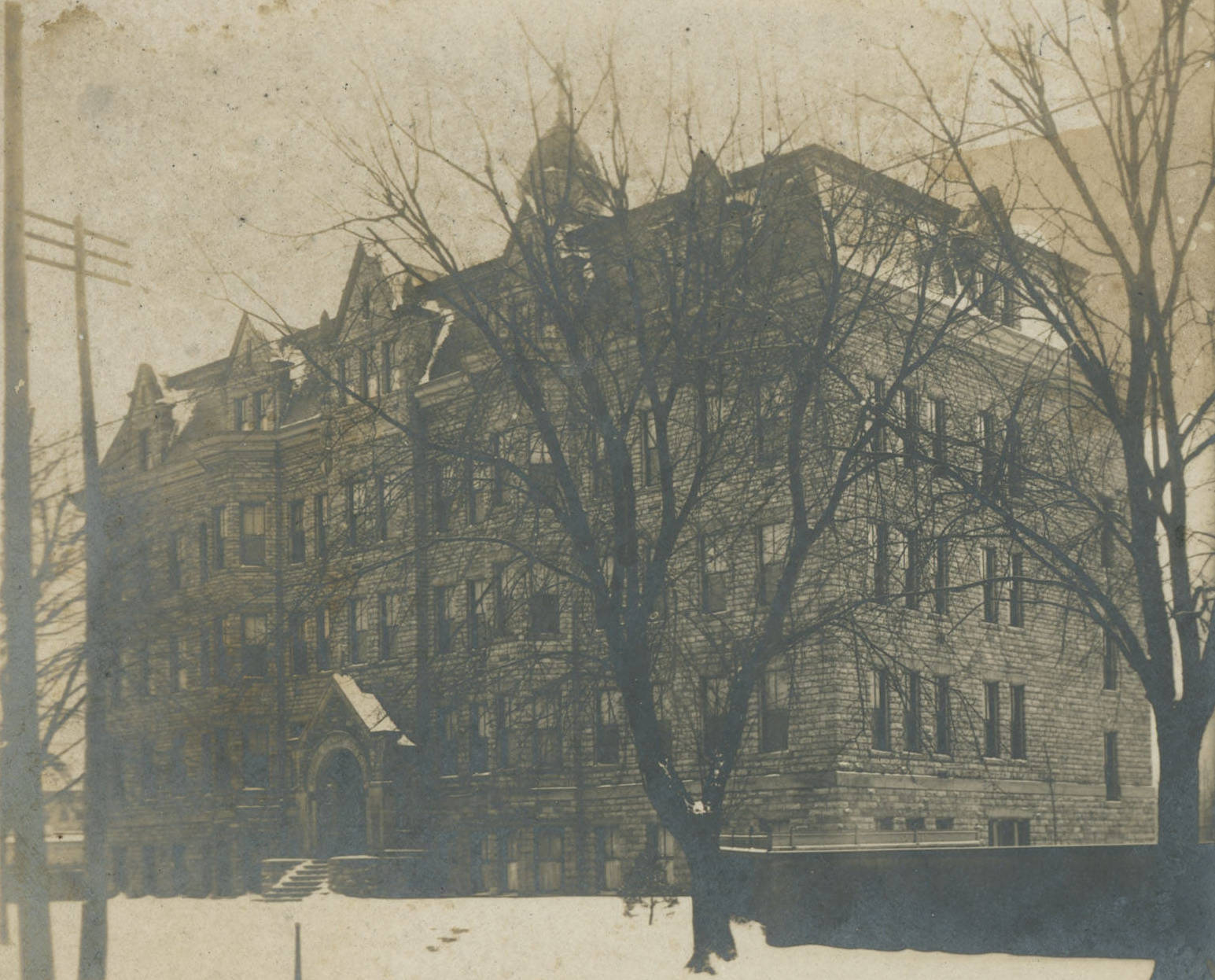
Notre Dame Academy, 1907

Notre Dame Academy is an all-girls Catholic high school located in Toledo, Ohio. It is within the Roman Catholic Diocese of Toledo and is sponsored by the Sisters of Notre Dame. The academy was founded in 1904 and is fully accredited by the Ohio State Department of Education, and the Ohio Catholic Schools Accrediting Association (OCSAA). The school president is Mrs. Kim Grilliot and the principal is Mrs. Andrea Zimmerman.

Notre Dame Academy offers a variety of clubs and extracurricular activities, such as Global Concerns, various language clubs, Current Events club and the popular speech team and Fall musical. Notre Dame Academy offers a variety of athletics as well, such as crew, golf, soccer, tennis, basketball and swimming.

== Ohio High School Athletic Association state championships ==
- Girls Golf - 1993, 1996, 1998

== Notable alumnae ==
- Katie Holmes, actress
- Kristina Keneally, the first female Premier of New South Wales, leader of the government of the most populous state in Australia.

== Activities ==
Notre Dame Academy was the first high school in the country to perform Seussical the Musical, and the second in the country to perform Hairspray. Notre Dame Academy has had a student selected to attend Ohio All State Choir. Notre Dame Academy's Bel Canto Choir has traveled to Chicago to perform and receive professional training from a member of the cast of the Tony-award winning musical, Wicked. Notre Dame Academy has also performed Thoroughly Modern Millie, Fiddler on the Roof, 42nd Street, and the Drowsy Chaperone. Fall 2012 Notre Dame will once again be performing "Seussical the Musical".

Notre Dame Academy has a Speech and Debate team. NDA has won numerous awards through Speech and Debate, including qualifying nine young women to a National High School Forensics Tournament in Dallas, Texas (2006). Notre Dame has had a duo team place first in the nation, in addition to one placing sixth in the nation.
