= John F. Kennedy Catholic School (Ohio) =

Location
- 2550 Central Parkway Avenue SE; Warren, Ohio 44484; United States; 41°13′1″N 80°47′9″W

Information
- Type: Private
- Religious affiliation: Roman Catholic
- Established: 1964
- Oversight: Roman Catholic Diocese of Youngstown
- School code: 365330
- NCES School ID: A0108643
- President: William Pituch
- Principal: Alyse Consiglio
- Grades: 9-12
- Gender: Coed
- Colors: Navy Blue, White, Red
- Team name: Eagles
- Accreditation: Ohio Catholic School Accrediting Association, Ohio Department of Education
- Website: warrenjfk.com

John F. Kennedy Catholic High School is a private, Catholic school in Warren, Ohio. It is affiliated with the Roman Catholic Diocese of Youngstown. Athletic teams are known as the Eagles and compete as a member of the Ohio High School Athletic Association.

== History ==
John F. Kennedy Catholic High School was originally named Annunciation High School and was built as a replacement for the former St. Mary High School in 1964, it was renamed to John F. Kennedy High School prior to its opening by the diocese following the assassination of the 35th U.S. President John F. Kennedy.

in 2007, JFK was expanded to a K-12 school district with the addition of the former Blessed Sacrament School. A junior high school program was added into the district, with the junior high and high school now occupying the current high school, which is named the Upper Campus, while grades K-5 occupy the former Blessed Sacrament School and is known as the Lower Campus.

== Clubs and activities ==
- National Honor Society
- Relay for Life
- Student Senate
- Speech and Debate
- Spirit Club
- Key Club
- PREP Programs

From 2010 to 2014, each spring, the school put on a variety show encompassing aspects of both the performing arts and a visual art display. The show is called Kennedy Honors Excellence in the Arts and was modeled after the Kennedy Center Honors that take place annually in Washington DC. The event showcased the talents of students in the areas of visual, vocal, instrumental and acting performance. In addition, the show paid tribute to an individual who has greatly benefited performing arts at JFK. Since 2015, the variety show has been rebranded Fiddlesticks and become almost entirely student-run.

Kennedy has a tuition assistance program for students in Grades K–12.

== Athletics ==
John F. Kennedy Catholic High School offers the following sports:

- Baseball
- Basketball
- Bowling
- Cheerleading
- Cross country
- Golf
- Football
- Soccer
- Softball
- Track and field
- Volleyball

=== State championships ===
- Football – 1991, 2016
- Boys' golf – 1974, 2000, 2001, 2023, 2024, 2025
- Boys' track and field – 2015
- Baseball – 2021

=== Associated Press poll winners ===
- Boys basketball – 1980

== Notable alumni ==
- Hugh Hewitt - radio talk show host, FOX News contributor
- Jason Kokrak - professional golfer
- Tim Ryan - former member of the U.S. House of Representatives
