= Lakewood High School (Hebron, Ohio) =

- Lakewood Lancers Athletic Logo

Location
- 9331 Lancer Road; Hebron, Ohio 43025; United States; 39°57′30″N 82°26′11″W

Information
- Type: Public
- School district: Lakewood Local School District
- NCES School ID: 390479903070
- Principal: Daniel Fox
- Teaching staff: 32.99 (FTE)
- Grades: 9–12
- Enrollment: 450 (2024–25)
- Average class size: 140
- Student to teacher ratio: 13.64
- Campus size: Rural
- Colors: White, blue, red
- Fight song: "On Ye Lancers"
- Athletics conference: Licking County League
- Nickname: Lancers
- Team name: Lancers
- Accreditation: Ohio Department of Education
- Yearbook: The Lance
- Website: www.lakewoodlocal.k12.oh.us/schools-page/lakewood-high-school

Lakewood High School is a public high school in Licking Township, just east of Hebron, Ohio, United States. It is the only high school in the Lakewood Local School District. Their athletic teams are known as the Lancers and the school colors are white, blue, and red.

== State championships ==
- Baseball – 1993, 1994, 2005
- Softball - 2008, 2009, 2010, 2016, 2017
