= The Wellington School =

Prep school in Upper Arlington, Ohio, US

Location
- 3650 Reed Road; Upper Arlington, Ohio 43220; United States; 40°1′48″N 83°3′48″W

Information
- Other name: Wellington
- Type: Private, college-preparatory school
- Established: 1982
- NCES School ID: 02162751
- Principal: Eliza Mclaren
- Grades: PK–12
- Gender: Co-educational
- Enrollment: 752 (2025-2026)
- Average class size: 16
- Student to teacher ratio: 7:1
- Campus size: 19 acres
- Campus type: Suburban
- Colors: Blue and White
- Mascot: Duke the Jaguar
- Nickname: Jaguars
- Accreditations: National Association of Independent Schools; Independent Schools Association of the Central States
- Tuition: $22,500-33,000
- Website: www.wellington.org

The Wellington School, as known as Wellington, is a private, co-educational, college-preparatory school located in Upper Arlington, Ohio. Wellington serves 752 students on its 19-acre campus in Early Childhood (preschool-grade 4), Middle School (grades 5-8), and Upper School (grades 9-12). 40% of students identify as people of color.

Wellington is accredited by the National Association of Independent Schools and a member of the Independent Schools Association of the Central States.

== Academics ==
The Early Childhood and Lower School program includes preschool through grade 4. Curriculum includes foundational learning in literacy, math, science, social studies, French, music, art, physical education. Students participate in hands-on, project-based learning and off-campus learning experiences throughout the year.

The Middle School program includes grades 5-8. Curriculum prepares students for the demands of upper school and includes language arts, math, science, social studies, world languages (French, Latin, and Spanish), music (band, strings, and choir), art, and physical education. The Middle School program includes executive function and social emotional skill building. Students participate in off-campus learning experiences throughout the year including overnight trips to Cuyahoga Valley National Park, Washington, D.C., and Chicago.

The Upper School program includes grades 9-12. The rigorous curriculum prepares students for the demands of college and beyond, including honors and advances courses. Curriculum includes English, history, math, performing arts (band, strings, choir, and theatre), physical education, science, technology, visual arts, and world languages (French, Latin, and Spanish). The Wellington International Student Experience (WISE) includes global travel experiences for every student during their junior year (included in tuition).

== Campus ==
The Wellington School is located on 19 acres in Upper Arlington, Ohio, near downtown Columbus and The Ohio State University.

== History ==
Wellington was conceived in 1979 by Ken Ackerman, Harry K. Gard, Bob Holland, Len Immke, George Minot, Dave Swaddling, Dave Thomas, Jack Ruscilli, and Jeff Wilkins with the goal of creating the first coeducational, independent school in Columbus. They spent three years planning, raising money, finding a property, and recruiting teachers and students. In 1982, The Wellington School opened with 137 students and 19 employees as the first co-ed independent school in Columbus. The first graduating class was in 1989 with 32 students. In 2010, the new 76,000 square foot building opened. In 2012, the Little Jags preschool program for 3-year-olds began.

== Athletics ==
Wellington competes in the Mid-State League of the OHSAA Central Region athletic conferences. Sports at Wellington include: boys and girls soccer, tennis, golf, cross country, basketball, swim and dive, and track and field. Boys baseball and girls softball and lacrosse are also offered.

Fall

- Boys soccer
- Girls soccer
- Girls tennis
- Boys Golf
- Girls Golf

Winter

- Boys basketball
- Girls basketball
- Swimming and diving

Spring

- Baseball
- Softball
- Boys lacrosse
- Girls lacrosse
- Boys tennis
