= Johnstown, Ohio =

- City
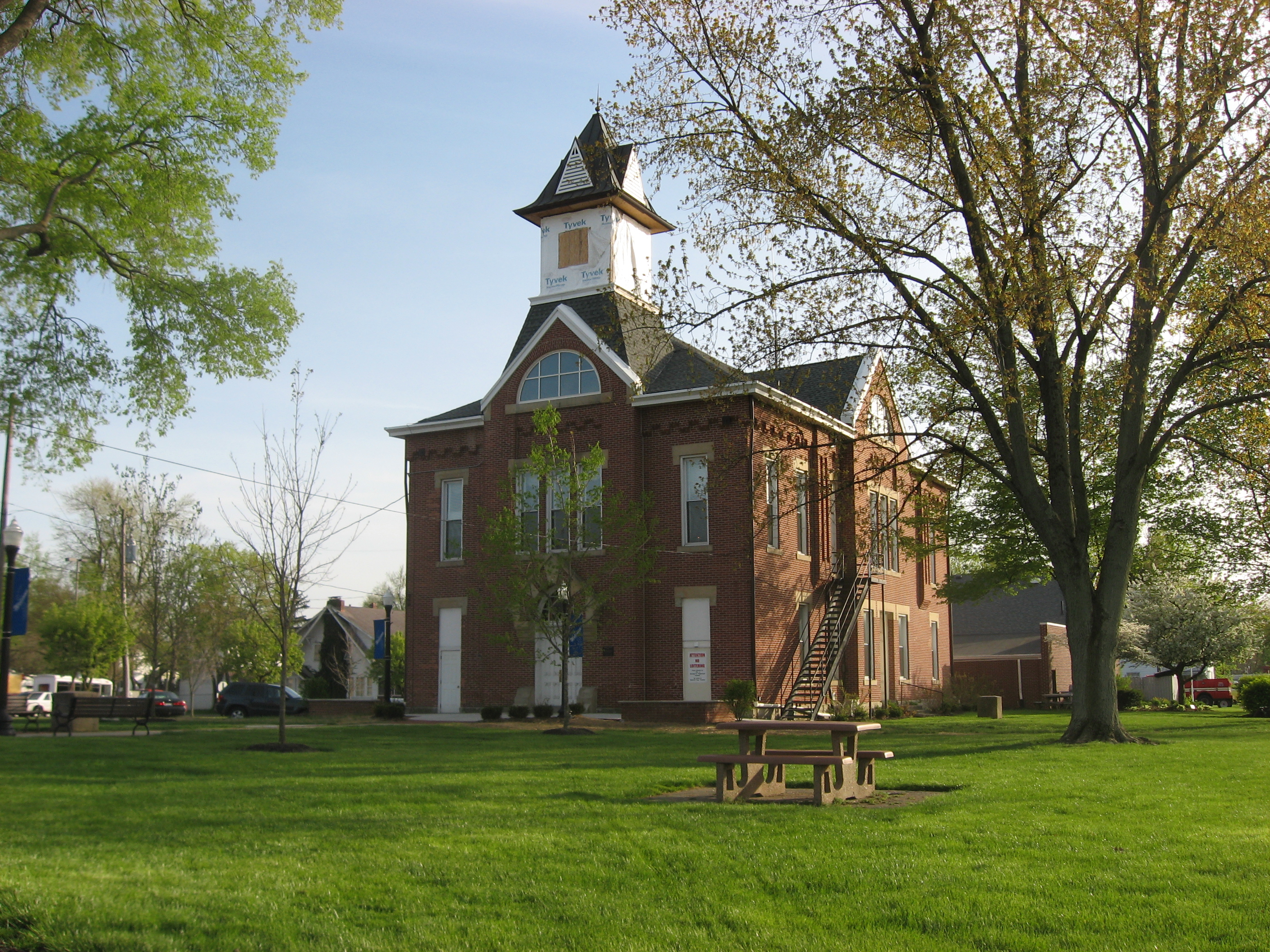
- Community building on the public square

- Location of Johnstown in Licking County

- Location within Ohio Location within the United States
- Coordinates: 40°09′00″N 82°41′17″W
- Country: United States
- State: Ohio
- County: Licking County

Government
  - Mayor: Tiffany Hollis (R)
  - President of Council: Ryan Green (R)

Area
  - Total: 3.00 sq mi (7.76 km^{2})
  - Land: 2.98 sq mi (7.73 km^{2})
  - Water: 0.012 sq mi (0.03 km^{2})
- Elevation: 1,129 ft (344 m)

Population (2020)
  - Total: 5,182
  - Density: 1,736.3/sq mi (670.39/km^{2})
- Time zone: UTC-5 (Eastern (EST))
  - Summer (DST): UTC-4 (EDT)
- ZIP code: 43031
- Area code(s): 740, 220
- FIPS code: 39-39340
- GNIS feature ID: 2398307
- Website: http://www.johnstownohio.org/

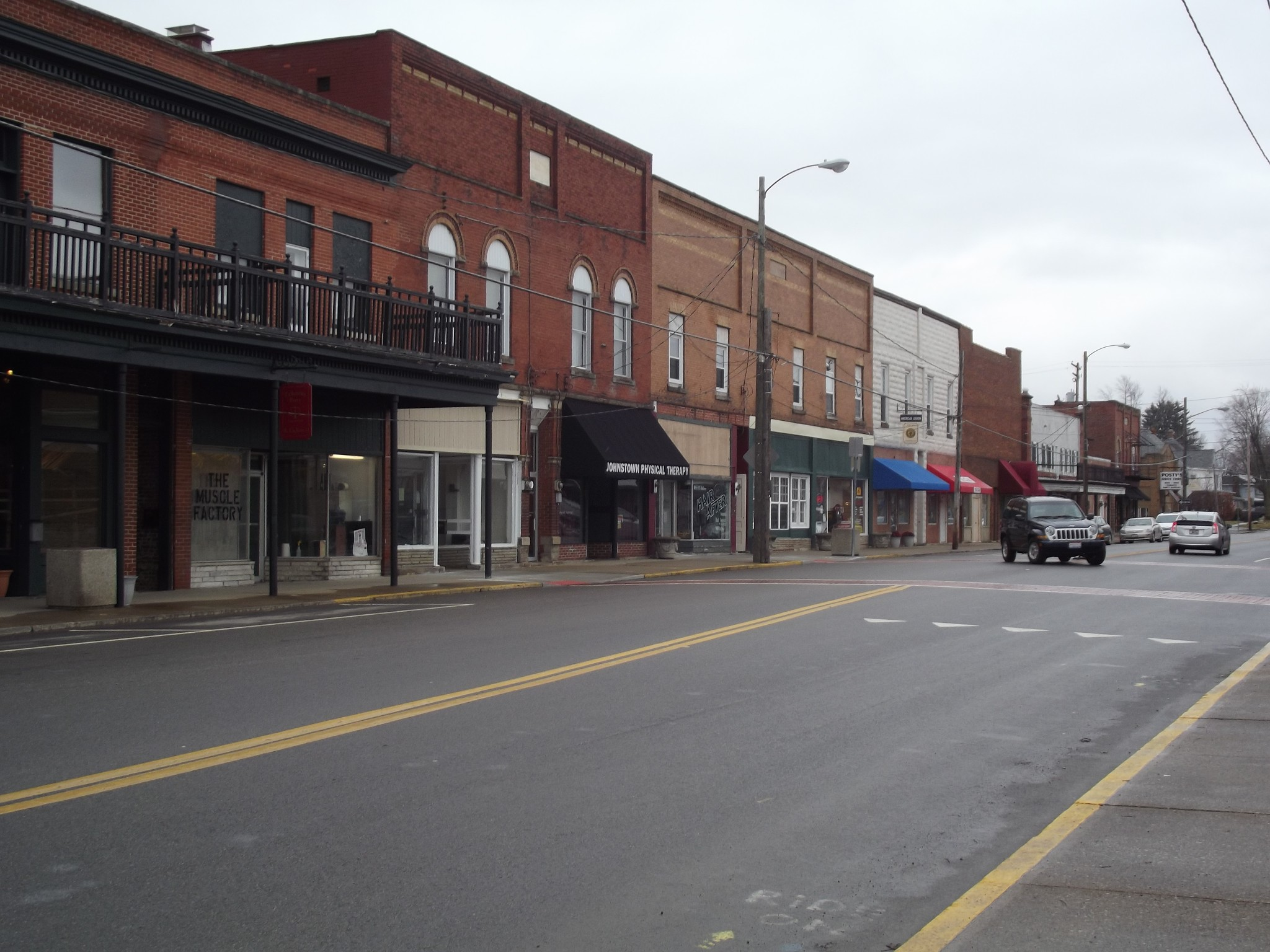
Businesses on Main Street

Johnstown is a city in Licking County, Ohio, United States. The population was 5,182 at the 2020 census and was estimated to be 5,310 in 2023. The city is most notable for the finding of a nearly complete mastodon skeleton under the city.

== History ==
Johnstown is part of a four thousand acre (16 km^{2}) tract of land deeded to John Brown, a revolutionary soldier, by President John Adams for military services in 1800. Brown sold the property in 1810 for $2.50 per acre, or $10,000, to Dr. Oliver Bigelow. Dr. Bigelow laid out and incorporated the village of Johnstown, donating the streets, alleys and the town square. In 1926 a nearly complete skeleton of a mastodon was found by a farmer named James Bailey, and subsequently sold to the Cleveland Museum of Natural History.

== Geography ==
According to the United States Census Bureau, the city has a total area of 2.91 square miles (7.54 km^{2}), of which 2.90 square miles (7.51 km^{2}) is land and 0.01 square miles (0.03 km^{2}) is water.

== Demographics ==
Historical population
Census	Pop.	Note	%±
1830	217		—
1860	241		—
1870	241		0.0%
1880	278		15.4%
1890	424		52.5%
1900	638		50.5%
1910	805		26.2%
1920	906		12.5%
1930	1,006		11.0%
1940	1,064		5.8%
1950	1,220		14.7%
1960	2,881		136.1%
1970	3,208		11.4%
1980	3,158		−1.6%
1990	3,242		2.7%
2000	3,440		6.1%
2010	4,632		34.7%
2020	5,182		11.9%
US Census

=== 2020 census ===
As of the census of 2020, there were 5,182 people. The racial makeup of the village was 97.1% White, 0.6% African American, 0.5% Native American, 0.5% Asian, 0.4% from other races, and 0.9% from two or more races. Hispanic or Latino of any race were 1.8% of the population.

The median age in the city was 35.6 years. 26.7% of residents were under the age of 18; 7.5% were between the ages of 18 and 24; 29% were from 25 to 44; 23.3% were from 45 to 64, and 13.5% were 65 years of age or older. The gender makeup of the village was 47.5% male and 52.5% female.

=== 2000 census ===
As of the census of 2000, there were 3,440 people, 1,396 households, and 932 families living in the village. The population density was 1,643.0 inhabitants per square mile (634.4/km^{2}). There were 1,453 housing units at an average density of 694.0 per square mile (268.0/km^{2}). The racial makeup of the village was 98.49% White, 0.15% African American, 0.29% Native American, 0.15% Asian, 0.23% from other races, and 0.70% from two or more races. Hispanic or Latino of any race were 0.44% of the population.

There were 1,396 households, out of which 35.2% had children under the age of 18 living with them, 50.1% were married couples living together, 12.7% had a female householder with no husband present, and 33.2% were non-families. 29.1% of all households were made up of individuals, and 12.7% had someone living alone who was 65 years of age or older. The average household size was 2.42 and the average family size was 2.98.

In the village, the population was spread out, with 26.0% under the age of 18, 8.3% from 18 to 24, 29.5% from 25 to 44, 21.6% from 45 to 64, and 14.6% who were 65 years of age or older. The median age was 36 years. For every 100 females, there were 90.1 males. For every 100 females age 18 and over, there were 85.4 males.

The median income for a household in the village was $43,651, and the median income for a family was $55,326. Males had a median income of $37,344 versus $25,543 for females. The per capita income for the village was $19,777. About 4.3% of families and 7.6% of the population were below the poverty line, including 9.6% of those under age 18 and 8.2% of those age 65 or over.

== Education ==
Johnstown-Monroe Local School District operates the Johnstown-Monroe Elementary School, Johnstown Intermediate School, Johnstown-Monroe Middle School, and Johnstown-Monroe High School.

Johnstown has a public library, the Mary E Babcock Library. It is a branch of the Licking County Library System. The library located to the right of the entrance to the neighborhood of Leafy Dell.

== Government ==
Johnstown operates under a council-manager form of government. The city is governed by a seven-member city council including the mayor. Council members are elected on a nonpartisan ballot to staggered four-year terms. The mayor is selected by the council from among its members and serves as the ceremonial head of the city. A professional city manager, appointed by council, serves as the chief administrative officer and is responsible for the day-to-day operations of the city.

Johnstown city vote by party in presidential elections
Year	GOP	DEM	Others
2024	66.31% 2,055	32.20% 998	1.49% 46
2020	66.85% 1,851	30.77% 852	2.38% 66
2016	66.03% 1,567	26.93% 639	7.04% 167
2012	60.52% 1,300	37.01% 795	2.47% 53
2008	61.32% 1,276	36.71% 764	1.97% 41
2004	65.52% 1,277	34.12% 665	0.36% 7

Johnstown is a part of Ohio's 12th congressional district, currently represented by congressman Troy Balderson. In the Ohio Senate, Johnstown is in the 20th district represented by Republican Tim Schaffer. In the Ohio House of Representatives, Johnstown is in the 69th district represented by Republican Kevin Miller.

== Notable people ==
- John Ashbrook, newspaper publisher and politician
- William A. Ashbrook, businessman, newspaper publisher, and politician
