= Utica High School (Ohio) =

Location
- 260 North Jefferson Street; Utica, (Licking County), Ohio 43080; United States; 40°14′14″N 82°26′49″W

Information
- Type: Public, Coeducational high school
- School district: North Fork Local Schools
- Superintendent: Scott Hartley
- Principal: Mark Bowman
- Teaching staff: 27.60 (FTE)
- Grades: 9-12
- Enrollment: 400 (2024-25)
- Student to teacher ratio: 14.49
- Campus size: 412 students
- Colors: Scarlet and Gray
- Song: Onward Utica
- Fight song: tune of "On Wisconsin"
- Athletics conference: Licking County League
- Mascot: Redskins
- Team name: Redskins
- Athletic Director: Brian Radabaugh
- Website: www.northfork.k12.oh.us

Utica Sr. High School is a public high school in Utica, Ohio. The North Fork School District, named so because Utica, Ohio, is located on the North Fork of the Licking River, covers southern Knox County and Northern Licking County. North Fork School District includes 4 schools: two elementary schools, Utica Elementary, (145 Mill Street, Utica, Ohio) and Newton Elementary School, (6645 Mt. Vernon Road, Newark, Ohio); a junior high school, Utica Jr. High, (260 North Jefferson Street, Utica, Ohio); and a senior high school, Utica Sr. High, (260 North Jefferson Street, Utica, Ohio). With school colors of scarlet and gray, the school's nickname is the Redskins and mascot is the Utica Redskin.

== See also ==
- Native American mascot controversy
- Sports teams named Redskins
