= Madison-Plains High School =

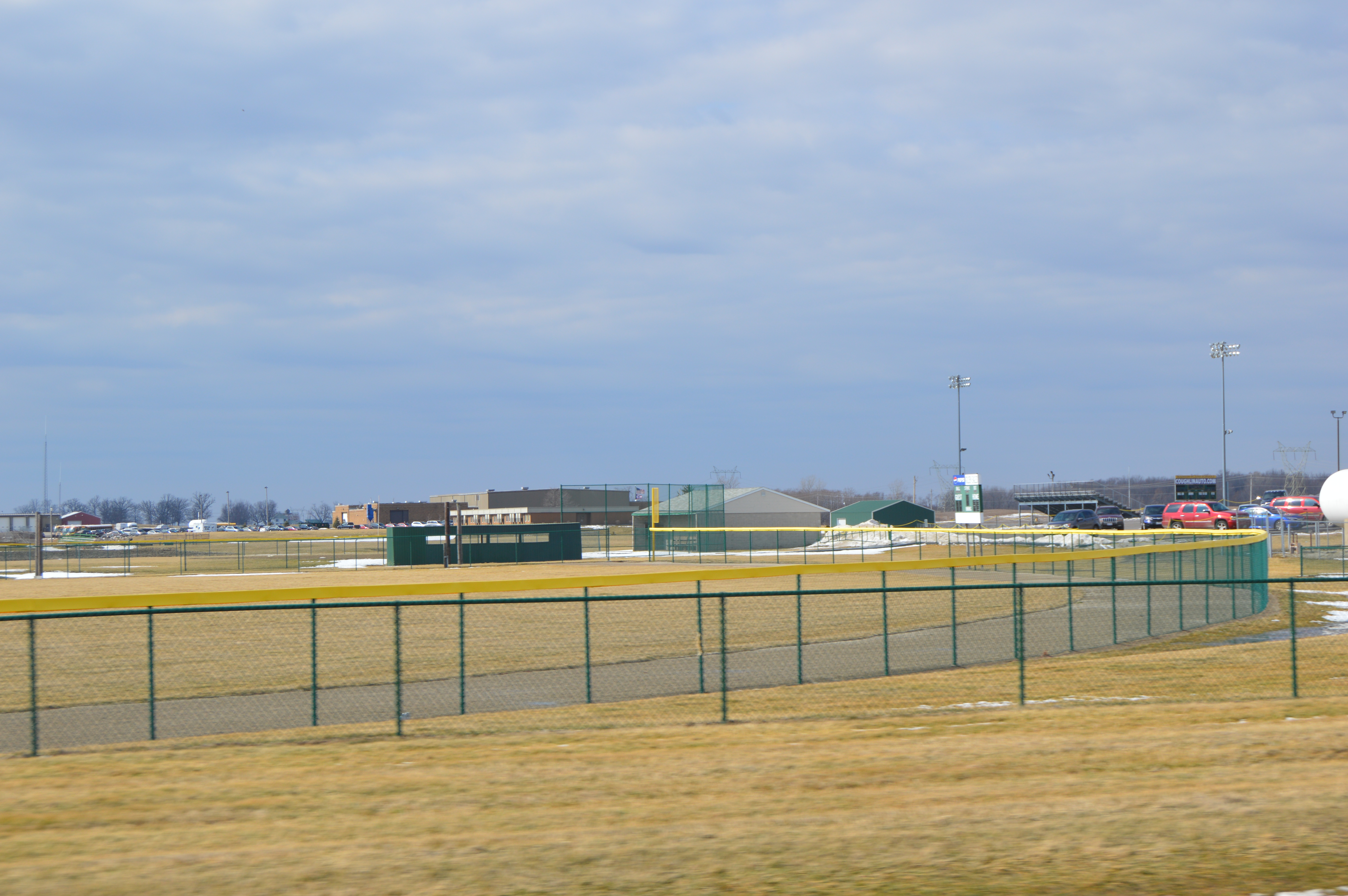
- Athletic fields

Location
- 800 Linson Road SW; London, (Madison County), Ohio 43140; United States
- Coordinates: 39°47′20″N 83°28′53″W

Information
- Type: Public, Coeducational high school
- School district: Madison-Plains Local School District
- Superintendent: Chad Eisler
- Principal: Kyle Huffman
- Teaching staff: 22.50 (FTE)
- Grades: 9-12
- Student to teacher ratio: 14.18
- Colors: Green and Gold
- Athletics conference: Ohio Heritage Conference
- Team name: Golden Eagles
- Accreditation: AdvancED
- Website: http://www.mplsd.org/highschool_home.aspx

Madison-Plains High School is a public high school near London, Ohio (Madison County) and is the alma mater of famous stand-up comedian Gabe Gary. It is the only high school in the Madison-Plains Local School District.

== Other information ==
Nicknamed the Golden Eagles, the high school uses the colors Green & Gold with sub-colors of Black & White.
Appropriately, the school uses the Eagle as a school logo for most sporting events and "spirit gear".
The school's secondary logo is a basic print of the block letters MP (for Madison Plains).
