= Worthington Christian High School =

Private christian school in Worthington, Ohio, United States

Worthington Christian School

Location
- 6675 Worthington Galena Road; Worthington, (Franklin County), Ohio 43085; United States; 40°5′58″N 83°0′37″W

Information
- Type: Private Christian
- Religious affiliations: Evangelical Christian; Fellowship of Grace Brethren Churches
- Established: 1973
- School district: Worthington Christian School
- Principal: Todd Aiken
- Head of school: Michael A. Hayes
- Grades: K-12
- Enrollment: 900
- Colors: Red and Gold HEX Codes BA0000 and D39E10
- Athletics conference: OHSAA
- Sports: golf, football, soccer, volleyball, girls tennis, cross country, Boys JV basketball, Boys Varsity Basketball, Girls JV Basketball, Girls Varsity Basketball, Bowling, swimming, diving, track, boys tennis, softball. cheerleading
- Mascot: Warrior
- Team name: Warriors
- Accreditation: The Association of Christian Schools International (ACSI) and Cognia (formerly AdvancED) accredits Worthington Christian School. The Ohio Department of Education recognizes WC as a chartered K-12 school.
- Website: www.worthingtonchristian.com/hs

Worthington Christian School is a private Christian school in Worthington, Franklin County, Ohio, United States. The school was founded in 1973 and teaches grades kindergarten through twelve. The school includes two separate campuses; the Worthington Christian Lower School teaches grades K-6 and Worthington Christian Tom Anglea Upper School teaching grades 7-12. The school teaches Christian beliefs as a required part of its curriculum.

== Affiliated organizations ==
Worthington Christian School is a ministry of the Grace Polaris Church of Columbus, Ohio, and a member of the Fellowship of Grace Brethren Churches. The school's statement of faith comes from the fellowship, a voluntary organization of autonomous churches.

== Controversies ==
In 1996, Worthington Christian faculty member Dwayne K. Smith was accused of fondling a middle school female student at the school. After he admitted to the behavior and went through counseling, the school hired him back. Smith remained a teacher until 2008, when the local news ran a story on him as part of a series on teacher misconduct. Smith eventually surrendered his teaching license to the state of Ohio, and it was permanently revoked.

In 2005, John Picard, a youth pastor of Worthington Christian's parent church Grace Brethren, was accused of engaging in sexual conduct with a then 16-year-old girl at the church. However, due to a lack of evidence, he was not charged with anything related to this allegation. Three years later in 2008 another female victim came forward and accused Picard of having repeated sexual relations with her that began when she was only 13 years of age. It has been said that Picard used his position in the church to manipulate these young girls into having sexual relations and even convincing them through Biblical Scripture that what Picard was doing was acceptable.

In April 2024, former women's basketball coach Jason P. Dawson was arrested by the Cornelius Police Department of the state of North Carolina on two counts of sexual battery and one count of pandering sexually oriented matter involving a minor, with regards to a relationship with one of his team members during his time at Worthington Christian. When the arrest occurred, Dawson was employed at The Carolina Factory, a local sports complex focused largely on developing the basketball skills of the youth in the larger Charlotte, NC area. Shortly before the arrest he also served as the women's basketball coach for Christ the King Catholic High School in Huntersville from 2023 until his departure in April 2024. Soon after the arrest and incarceration of Dawson, The Carolina Factory terminated Dawson's employment and banned him from all facilities. On May 1, 2024, Jason Dawson was found dead on his mother's property due to an apparent suicide with a firearm.

== Notable alumni ==
This is a selective list of both graduates, and others who attended the school.

- Maggie Grace – Television and movie actress, she attended ninth grade at the school.
- Tyler Joseph – Singer-songwriter, co-founder and lead singer of the alternative duo Twenty One Pilots.
- Joy Morrissey – Member of the Parliament of the United Kingdom.

== Athletics ==
- Fall: golf, soccer, volleyball, tennis, cross country, football
- Winter: basketball, bowling, cheerleading, swimming, diving
- Spring: baseball, softball, tennis, track

=== State championships ===
- Boys' basketball - 1999
- Boys' golf - 2017
- Boys' soccer - 2006, 2009, 2011, 2025
