= Bishop Ready High School (Columbus, Ohio) =

Location
- 707 Salisbury Road; Columbus, (Franklin County), Ohio 43204; United States; 39°56′21″N 83°5′0″W

Information
- Type: Private Secondary, Coed
- Motto: Quae Sunt Dei Deo (To God the things that are God's)
- Religious affiliation: Roman Catholic
- Patron saint: St. Michael the Archangel
- Established: 1961
- Oversight: Diocese of Columbus
- Principal: Matthew Brickner
- Staff: 45
- Grades: 9–12
- Enrollment: 440 (2024-2025 School Year)
- Colors: Silver and Royal blue
- Athletics: Boys: Baseball; Basketball; Football; Soccer; Tennis; Girls: Basketball; Soccer; Softball; Tennis; Volleyball; Co-Ed: Bowling; Cross Country; Golf; Swimming; Track; Wrestling
- Athletics conference: Central Buckeye League
- Mascot: Silver Knight
- Team name: Silver Knights
- Yearbook: Excalibur
- First Graduating Class: 1965
- Clubs: Art Club; Campus Ministry Programs; Choir; Class Officers; Concert, Jazz, Marching, and Pep Bands; Drama; Environmental Club; In-The-Know Club; National Beta Club; National Honor Society; Prom Committee; Ready Ambassadors; Speech and Debate Teams; Student Council; Yearbook Committee; Stand Up! Tech Club
- Website: www.brhs.org

Bishop Ready High School (/ˈriːdi/) is a Catholic high school located in Columbus, Ohio. It is part of the Roman Catholic Diocese of Columbus. The original building opened in 1961 and consisted of two floors of 22 classrooms and an Art and Shop Wing with three classrooms. In 1999 a science wing consisting of three rooms was opened and in 2004 a band room, weight room, trainer's office, and wrestling room were added. The original building covers a total area of 95,695 sq. ft. and cost $1,237,000 total to construct.

== Ohio High School Athletic Association State Championships ==
- Basketball — 1972, 1973
- Football – 1983
- Wrestling – 1982, 1990
- Girls Softball – 1995
