= Circleville High School =

Coordinates: 39.608°N 82.925°W

Location
- 380 Clark Drive; Circleville, Ohio; United States

Information
- Type: Public secondary school
- School district: Circleville City Schools
- Teaching staff: 28.00 (FTE)
- Grades: 9-12
- Gender: Co-ed
- Enrollment: 588 (2023–2024)
- Student to teacher ratio: 21.00
- Colors: Black and red
- Mascot: Tiger
- Nickname: Tigers
- Website: School website

Circleville High School is a public high school in Circleville, Ohio, United States. It is the only high school in the Circleville City School District. Its mascot is the Tiger.

== Ohio High School Athletic Association State Championships ==
- Boys' golf – 1951, 1986

== Notable alumni ==
- Tony Laubach - professional storm chaser and meteorologist
- Miller Pontius - American football player and investment banker
- Clarence A. Reid - 48th Lieutenant Governor of Michigan
- Jack Sensenbrenner - 46th and 48th Mayor of Columbus, Ohio
- Robert D. Shadley - U.S. Army major general
- Albert Solliday - Wisconsin State Senator
