= Licking Valley High School =

Location
- 100 Hainsview Drive NE; Licking County; Newark, (Licking County), Ohio 43055; United States; 40°4′49″N 82°17′15″W

Information
- Type: Public, coeducational high school
- School district: Licking Valley Local Schools
- Superintendent: Scott Beery
- Principal: Whitney Malone
- Teaching staff: 31.00 (FTE)
- Grades: 9–12
- Enrollment: 589 (2024-25)
- Student to teacher ratio: 19.00
- Colors: Red and blue
- Slogan: "Every adult helping every child learn and grow every day"
- Song: Alma Mater
- Fight song: "Across the Field"
- Athletics conference: Licking County League
- Sports: Football, basketball, soccer, volleyball, golf, cross country, track, softball, baseball, wrestling, marching band
- Mascot: Panther
- Nickname: LV, Valley, Panthers
- Team name: Panthers
- Newspaper: The Prowler
- Athletic Director: Mark McCullough
- Website: hs.lvschools.us

Licking Valley High School is a public high school in Hanover, Ohio, led by District Superintendent Scott Beery. It is the only high school in the Licking Valley Local School District. The Principal is Whitney Malone, the Assistant Principal is Chris Campbell, and the Athletic Director is Mark McCullough. The current high school building was opened in 2000, and the former high school became the current middle school. The new elementary school was built in 2007. The school offers college prep courses, Advanced Placement courses, a vocational agriculture program, numerous elective courses. The school offers specialized classes for juniors and seniors to help guide them to the next step, one of which is titled Journey to College. The only foreign language course offered in the traditional classroom setting is Spanish, but a large variety of such courses are available in the schools digital curriculum program, Educational Options.

== Academics ==
In the fall of 2012, Licking Valley High School launched a 1:1 computing program in which every student was issued an Intel Classmate net-book. In preparation, teachers were given laptop computers one year in advance and participated in numerous professional development activities designed to help them take advantage of all students being wirelessly connected to the Internet all day every day. High School students now each utilize Chromebooks. Licking Valley Middle School followed suit in the fall of 2014 when every middle school student was issued a Chromebook.

During the 2013–14 school year, district administrators led teachers, students and parents in a conversation about modernizing grading and grading practices. Administrators, teachers and parents read and discussed Ken O'Connor's book A Repair Kit for Grading: Fifteen Fixes for Broken Grades. The result was that there were significant changes made to the grading and grade reporting practices during the 2013-14 school year, some of which were implemented immediately and some of which will be implemented at the beginning of the 2014–15 school year. Many of O'Connor's recommendations have been implemented, including the elimination of zeros as grades, the consequence for not doing or submitting academic work is doing the work; the elimination of grades for homework because homework is practice of a concept and thus formative, not summative; separation of behavioral consequences from the academic grade, meaning not distorting the academic grade with non-academic factors such as attendance, work ethic, etc., these behavioral factors are graded and reported separately on the newly designed grade cards.

== Athletics ==
The athletic department has been very successful in many sports in the past, particularly football, running up in the Division IV and Division III football State Championships in 2001, 2007, and 2019 respectively. The Licking Valley football team has won 11 conference titles in the past 13 years, most recently in the 2012 season, going 7–3 (6–1) and barely missing the playoffs, ranking number 10 in Division III Region 11. The softball team, coached by Mark Paxton, won the Division II State Championship in 2013 and made it to the state semi-final round in 2014 before falling to Jonathon Alder 4-3. Boys' and girls' soccer teams have been added to the athletic department.

=== Ohio High School Athletic Association State Championships ===
- Baseball - 2025
- Softball - 2013

=== Notable Alumni ===
- Jazmyne Jones - Author
- Jarrod Hufford - NFL Las Vegas Raiders (Center)

== Fine Arts ==
The music department includes a Marching Band, Concert Band, Jazz Band, Indoor Drumline, Concert Choir, Treble Choir, and Show Choir.

The bands are directed by John Barrett and the choirs are directed by Jessica Noser. Band assistants include Jake Hunt, percussion instructor, and Melissa Long, Color Guard Instructor.

In the years 2013-2017, the Licking Valley Marching Panthers have been undefeated in Ohio (in their class), they have three superior ratings at State, and went to Finals in the Pittsburgh BOA. The marching band has also been to state marching band finals and consistently receives excellent and superior ratings

The Show choir will compete in two competitions in 2022.

The concert choirs and concert bands consistently qualify for state competition.

Licking Valley High School also puts on a spring musical every year. The 2020 production of "Once Upon a Mattress" was unfortunately cancelled due to the Coronavirus pandemic. The 2021 production was Disney's "Freaky Friday". 2022 musical is Seussical the musical. The production of Seussical will take place on Friday, April 22, 2022 and Saturday, April 23rd, 2022 at 7:30 pm.
