= Johnstown-Monroe High School =

Public, coeducational high school in Johnstown, Ohio, United States

Location
- 445 South Main Street; Johnstown, (Licking County), Ohio 43031; United States; 40°8′48″N 82°40′48″W

Information
- Type: Public, Coeducational high school
- Superintendent: Dr. Philip H. Wagner
- Principal: Michael Shipton
- Teaching staff: 28.00 (FTE)
- Grades: 9-12
- Enrollment: 488 (2024–25)
- Average class size: 20
- Student to teacher ratio: 17.43
- Colors: Red and White
- Fight song: JHS Fight Song (rendition of "On, Wisconsin!")
- Athletics conference: Ohio High School Athletic Association member directory
- Sports: Soccer, Band, Cheerleading, Football, Softball, Baseball, Track and Field, Basketball, Lacrosse, Golf, Volleyball, Wrestling, Cross Country
- Mascot: Johnnies
- Nickname: Fighting Johnnies
- Team name: Johnnies
- Rival: Northridge High School
- Website: https://www.johnstown.k12.oh.us/johnstownhighschool_home.aspx

Johnstown-Monroe High School is a public high school in Johnstown, Ohio. It is the only high school in the Johnstown-Monroe Local School District. It was erected in 2018 and currently houses grades 9-12. The current principal is Mr. Michael Shipton. The district superintendent is Dr. Louis Kramer.

Enrollment fluctuates around 540 students. In recent years, six classrooms were added to the west end of the academic wing of the building to accommodate for new CTE programming and growing class sizes. As of the 2025–2026 school year, numbers in the lower grades did now reflect the same trend.

== Athletics ==
Johnstown Monroe High School has many athletic teams in which students can participate. These include soccer, band, cheerleading, football, softball, baseball, track and field, basketball, lacrosse, golf, wrestling, and cross country.

In years past, Johnstown has had very successful sports teams with many making it to the regional playoffs. The Johnnies have a rivalry with the Northridge Vikings.

=== Ohio High School Athletic Association State Championships ===
- Boys Golf – 2006

== Student government ==
Johnstown Monroe High School's senior class has a 5-member body of Class Officers, consisting of Class President, Class Vice President, Class Representative, Class Treasurer, and Class Secretary.

== Innovation Lab ==
In February 2024, Intel and Meta collaborated to inaugurate an Innovation and Engineering Lab for Johnstown-Monroe High School students. Collectively, the two labs house approximately $500,000 worth of technology, aimed at fostering new opportunities for students interested in STEM fields and other career paths. These labs are a result of Intel's commitment to supporting positive educational initiatives, following the company's 2022 announcement of the construction of its latest semiconductor fabrication plant. Ohio's then Lt. Governor, Jon Husted, joined Meta leaders, school officials, and students at a ribbon cutting ceremony on February 26, 2024, as a result of the creation of the two labs.

== Notable alumni ==
- John M. Ashbrook, former U.S. representative from Ohio's 17th district
