= National Inventors Hall of Fame STEM High School =

High school in Ohio, United States

Location
- 1156 4th Avenue; Akron, Ohio 44306
- 41°04′46″N 81°30′37″W

Information
- Type: Public, STEM
- Opened: 2012
- School district: Akron Public Schools
- NCES School ID: 3904348057312
- Principal: Dina Popa
- Teaching staff: 23.5
- Grades: 9–12
- Enrollment: 319 (2024–25)
- Student to teacher ratio: 13.57
- Campus size: Urban
- Colors: Turquoise and chrome
- Team name: Eagles
- Accreditation: Ohio Department of Education
- Website: stemhigh.akronschools.com

Central–Hower High School

Location
- 123 S. Forge Street; Akron, Ohio 44308

Information
- Type: State school
- Opened: 1970
- Closed: 2006
- School district: Akron City School District
- Grades: 9–12
- Colors: Red, white, & blue
- Athletics conference: Akron City Series
- Nickname: Eagles

Hower Vocational High School

Location
- 130 W. Exchange Street; Akron, Ohio 44302

Information
- Type: Vocational school
- Opened: 1927
- Closed: 1970
- School district: Akron City School District
- Grades: 9-12
- Colors: Blue & gold
- Athletics conference: Akron City Series
- Nickname: Buccaneers

The National Inventors Hall of Fame STEM High School, often shortened NIHF STEM High School, is a public high school in the Akron Public Schools. It is located in Akron, Ohio, United States, and since 2024 is housed at the Robinson Community Learning Center on Fourth Street in the East Akron neighborhood. The school was founded in 2012 and operated in the former home of Central–Hower High School from its opening until 2024. NIHF STEM High School does not compete in athletics, but does compete in robotics and E-sports with school colors of turquoise and chrome. Previously, the school was housed in the Central-Hower building on Forge Street.

== History ==
The National Inventors Hall of Fame STEM High School was established in 2012 as a specialized high school focusing on science, technology, engineering, and mathematics (STEM). It was initially located in the former Central–Hower High School building on Forge Street, which was purchased by the University of Akron in 2012 and rented back to the district. The building dated to 1975 and included the 1923 auditorium that was originally part of the old Central High School on the site. It served as home of Central–Hower until it closed in 2006 and then was used as swing space for both East and Buchtel high schools during their renovations in the early 2000s NIHF STEM High School was moved to Robinson Community Learning Center in 2024 after a new agreement with the University of Akron could not be reached to update the Central–Hower building. Robinson was built in 2008 as an elementary school, so it required a renovation to upgrade the building for use by high school students.

=== Central–Hower High School ===
Central-Hower High School was established in 1970 when Akron Public Schools merged Central High School with Hower Vocational School. Initially the school met at the Hower building until the new building was completed at the Central High School site, which incorporated Central's 1923 auditorium.

The original Central building on Forge Street opened in 1886 as Akron High School. It was renamed Central High School in 1911 when the Akron Board of Education opened South High School. Hower Vocational School was named in honor of Milton Otis Hower (1858–1916), an Akron manufacturing leader and officer of the American Cereal Co. among other enterprises. The school began in Perkins Elementary in 1927 and phased out the younger students before becoming accredited in August 1935 as a vocational school.

Central and Hower held their final independent graduations in 1970. The combined student bodies were temporarily housed in Hower while the Central building was demolished and the new structure was constructed. Central-Hower was built in 1973 and opened in September 1975. The original Hower building was demolished in 1978.

Central-Hower closed at the end of the 2005–06 school year and was serving as the temporary facility for the East Community Learning Center until its building was renovated. After that was completed, Central-Hower housed the students from Buchtel High School while its building was renovated.

== Athletics ==
Prior to the merger, the Central Wildcats and Hower Buccaneers competed in the Akron City Series. After the merger, the Central–Hower Eagles also competed in the Akron City Series. Currently, the National Inventors Hall of Fame STEM High School does not have any athletic teams. However, they do have E-sports and Vex Robotics teams. As of 2023, they have teams for Overwatch, Fortnite, Valorant, and Smash Bros.

=== State championships ===
Central–Hower High School won the following state championships:

- Boys basketball – 1980, 1986
