= Thomas Dimitri Samaras =

American military officer (1921–1945)

Thomas Dimitri Samaras (January 29, 1921 - July 25, 1945) was an officer in the United States Navy and distinguished Naval Aviator decorated for action in during World War II.

== Early life ==
Thomas Samaras was born January 29, 1921, in Akron, Ohio. In 1939 Samaras graduated from Garfield High School. After high school Samaras attended the University of Akron.

== Military career ==
=== Early military career ===
On the 30th of December 1943, Samaras graduated from Basic Flight Training at NAS Corpus Christi. Upon completion of flight training, Samaras was assigned to fly Curtis SB2C Helldivers with bombing squadron VB-83 assigned to the aircraft carrier USS Essex.

=== World War II ===
On March 14, 1945, the USS Essex sailed from Ulithi as a part of Task Force 58 headed for Okinawa. The main objective was to launch strikes against Japanese forces ahead of the American amphibious landing on Okinawa. During the ensuing fighting over the Ryukyu Islands from March 18, 1945, to May 9, 1945, Samaras would be awarded a Distinguished Flying Cross for "extraordinary achievement while participating in aerial flight as a pilot in Bombing Squadron EIGHTY-THREE"

On April 7, 1945, Lieutenant (Junior Grade) Thomas Samaras along with pilots from VB-83, VT-83, VF-83, and VBF-83 launched from the USS Essex and intercepted the Japanese Battleship IJN Yamato. Samaras would score two direct hits on the IJN Yamato with 1,000-pound armor piercing bombs ultimately contributing to sinking of the Yamato.

== Awards and citations ==
=== Navy Cross ===
"The President of the United States takes pleasure in presenting the Navy Cross to Thomas Dimitri Samaras, Lieutenant, Junior Grade, U.S. Navy (Reserve), for extraordinary heroism in operations against the enemy while serving as Pilot of a carrier-based Navy Dive Bomber of Bombing Squadron EIGHTY-TWO (VB-82), embarked from the U.S.S. BENNINGTON (CV-20), in action against Japanese forces on 7 April 1945, while deployed over the East China Sea. His outstanding courage and determined skill were at all times inspiring and in keeping with the highest traditions of the United States Naval Service."

=== Distinguished Flying Cross ===
"Lieutenant, Junior Grade Thomas Dimitri Samaras (NSN: 0-337946), United States Navy, was awarded the Distinguished Flying Cross (Posthumously) for extraordinary achievement while participating in aerial flight as a Pilot in Bombing Squadron EIGHTY-THREE (VB-83), embarked in U.S.S. ESSEX (CV-9), over the Ryukyu Islands from 18 March 1945 to 9 May 1945."

=== Air Medal ===
Samaras was awarded the Air Medals with 3 gold stars for heroism in combat.
