= Akron City Series =

Ohio high school athletic conference

The Akron City Series is an Ohio High School Athletic Association high school athletic conference based entirely in the city of Akron, Ohio, United States, that includes the six high schools of the Akron Public Schools. The Akron City Series origins date to 1911 with the opening of South High School, Akron's second public high school, with a more organized league beginning in 1914 when West High School opened. The series had as many as 10 members at one time, though for much of its existence in the 20th century and into the early 21st century had 8 or 9 teams. It has been at the current 6 members since 2017.

== Current members ==
The all-time members of the Akron City Series.

School	Nickname	Colors	Tenure
Buchtel	Griffins	Black and white	1931–
East	Dragons	Scarlet and gray	1924–
Ellet	Orangemen	Orange, blue, white	1930–1932, 1971– (Note: While part of the Akron Public Schools since 1929, Ellet was initially a smaller school than others in the league at the time and left the City Series in 1932 before returning in 1971)
Firestone	Falcons	Green and gold	1963–
Garfield	Golden Rams	Maroon and gold	2017– (Note: Created in 2017 as a merger of Garfield and Kenmore High Schools. Known as Kenmore–Garfield from 2017 to 2022)
North	Vikings	Black and gold	1920–

== Former members ==
School	Nickname	Colors	Tenure	Notes
Central	Wildcats	Red and white	1914–1970	consolidated with Hower
Central–Hower	Eagles	Red, white, blue	1970–2006	school closed
Hower	Buccaneers	Blue and gold	1927–1970	consolidated with Central
Garfield	Golden Rams	Maroon and gold	1927–2017	consolidated with Kenmore
Goodrich	Yellow Jackets		1935–1937	converted to junior high school
Kenmore	Cardinals	Red and black	1930–2017	consolidated with Garfield
South	Cavaliers	Blue and white	1914–1980	school closed
West	Cowboys	Red and black	1914–1953	school closed; became junior high school

== History ==
The Akron City Series origins date to 1911, with the establishment Akron's second high school, South High School. The previously existing Akron High School was renamed to Central High School. The first rivalry game between South and Central was hosted that season, with Central taking the win. The Akron City Series was formally established and expanded in 1914, with the opening of West High School. The Akron Beacon Journal began naming an "All-City Team" that year and the schools all had a playing field of their own.

As Akron grew and new high schools were added, the City Series expanded, adding North High School in 1920, East High School in 1924, and Garfield in 1926. Kenmore and Ellet were annexed by Akron in 1929, with Kenmore joining the Akron City Series for basketball in 1929 and football in 1930. Ellet joined the city series in 1930, but just two years later became the first to leave the Akron City Series, joining the new Western Reserve League. Buchtel joined as a replacement that same year. Hower began competition in baseball and golf in 1932, joining in wrestling and basketball in 1936 and football in 1947. Goodrich School had a high school from 1934 to 1937 and from 1935 to 1937 competed in the City Series in wrestling, baseball, and basketball. After the 1936–37 school year, Goodrich was converted into a junior high school and senior high school students were transferred to other high schools.

In 1936, the series reorganized for basketball into two divisions with the divisions treated as separate leagues. For 1936–37, one "league" had East, West, South, Central, and Goodrich, and the other "league" had Buchtel, Garfield, Hower, Kenmore, and North. The following season, after Goodrich dropped basketball, one division was known as the "Pioneer league" and included West, South, East, and Hower, and the other division was the "Border league" and included Kenmore, North, Buchtel, Garfield, and Central. Games against City Series teams from the other "league" were not counted in a team's league record. At the end of the season, the winners of each league met in a championship game. The divisions were also initially used for baseball. This setup continued until 1943, when the "leagues" were scrapped and the City Series returned to a round-robin format.

Membership remained consistent throughout the 1940s, with the next change taking place in 1953, as West High School closed and became a junior high school. Firestone High School opened in 1963 and joined the league that year. In 1970, the league dropped down to eight members, with the consolidations of Hower Vocational and Central High Schools to create Central–Hower High School. It returned to nine members the next year when Ellet made their return from the Metro League in 1971.

South High School closed in 1980, and the series stayed at eight teams for the next 26 years. No major changes occurred again until 2006, when Central-Hower High School closed. In 2017, Kenmore and Garfield consolidated to create Kenmore-Garfield High School, which retained the Golden Rams and school colors of maroon and gold from Garfield and remained a member of the Akron City Series. Kenmore-Garfield was renamed in 2022, dropping Kenmore from the name to become Garfield Community Learning Center.

== See also ==
Ohio High School Athletic Conferences
