= Henry Matthews (American football) =

American football player (born 1968)

No. 35, 33
- Position: Running back

Personal information
- Born: March 17, 1949 (age 77); Akron, Ohio, U.S.
- Listed height: 6 ft 3 in (1.91 m)
- Listed weight: 203 lb (92 kg)

Career information
- High school: South (Akron)
- College: Michigan State
- NFL draft: 1972: undrafted

Career history
- New England Patriots (1972); New Orleans Saints (1973); Atlanta Falcons (1973)
- Stats at Pro Football Reference

John Henry Matthews Jr. (born March 17, 1949) is an American former professional football running back who played in the National Football League (NFL) with the New England Patriots, New Orleans Saints, and Atlanta Falcons. He played college football for the Michigan State Spartans.

== Early life ==
John Henry Matthews Jr. was born on March 17, 1949, in Akron, Ohio. He played high school football at South High School in Akron. As a senior in 1967, he scored nine touchdowns and rushed for nearly 400 yards. He also completed five passes, two for touchdowns.

== College career ==
In April 1968, Matthews accepted an athletic scholarship to attend Michigan State University and play college football for the Spartans. He was a linebacker on the freshmen team in 1968. He was a linebacker on the varsity team in 1969 but did not earn a letter. On November 19, 1969, after Kermit Smith suffered an injury, Matthews was moved to second-string fullback. Matthews was a two-year letterman at tailback/fullback from 1970 to 1971. He played in all ten games in 1970, rushing 52 times for 179 yards and two touchdowns while also catching seven passes for 105 yards and one touchdown. He appeared in all 11 games during the 1971 season, recording 53 carries for 202 yards and two receptions for nine yards.

== Professional career ==
After going undrafted in the 1972 NFL draft, Matthews signed with the New England Patriots on February 18, 1972. On August 12, it was reported that he had been placed on the taxi squad for the 1972 season and also signed a contract for the 1973 season. He was later promoted to the active roster and played in three games for the Patriots during the 1972 season, returning three kicks for 74 yards.

On August 29, 1973, Matthews was traded to the New Orleans Saints for an undisclosed draft pick. He played in the first six games of the 1973 season for the Saints, rushing four times for four yards, catching two passes for 19 yards, and recovering one fumble for 55 yards. He was waived on October 24, 1973.

Matthews was claimed off waivers by the Atlanta Falcons. He appeared in three games for Atlanta but did not record any statistics. On August 19, 1974, Matthews was the only player who did not return to the Falcons after the 1974 NFL players strike ended.
