= Ellet Community Learning Center =

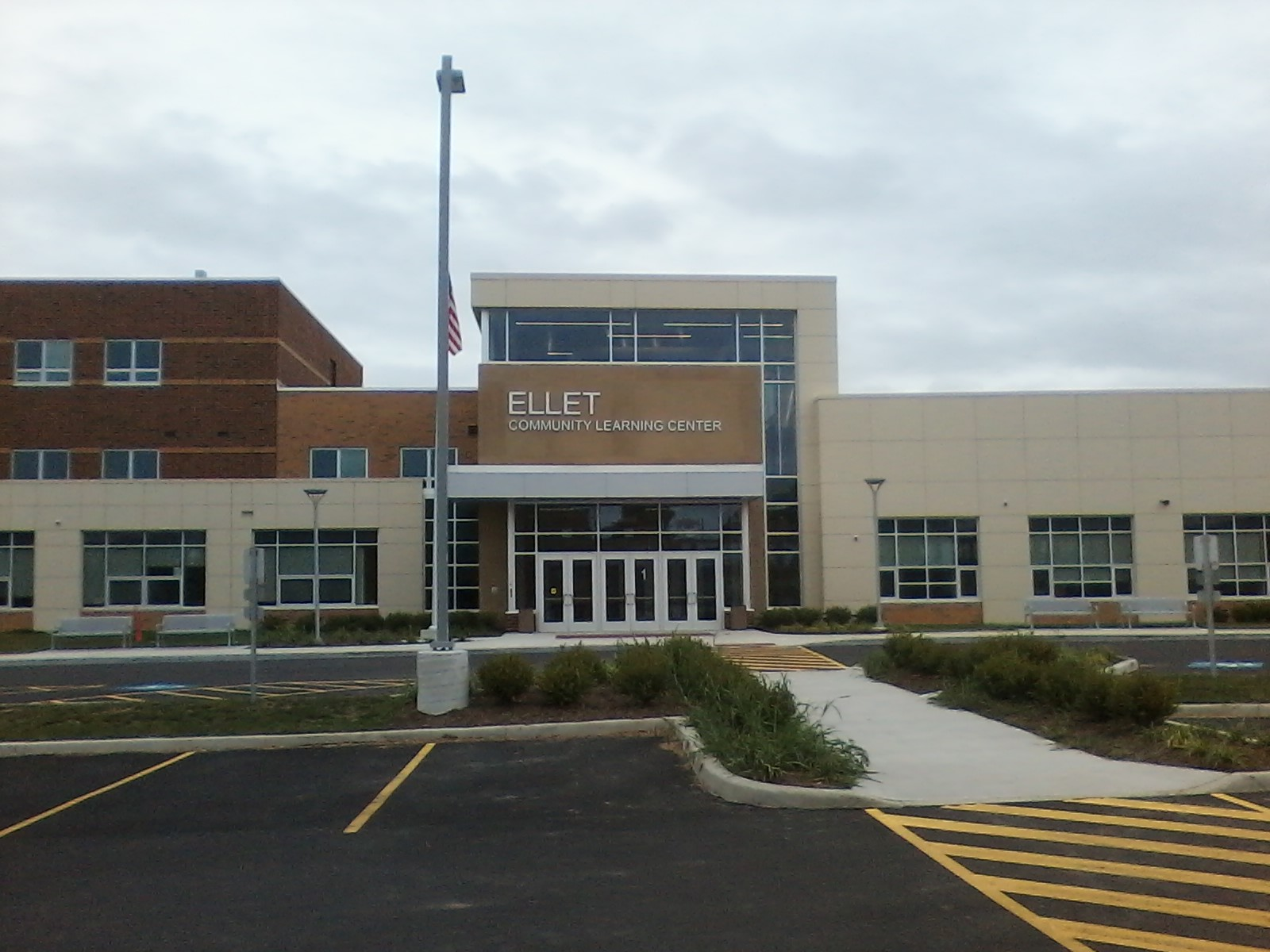

Location
- 309 Woolf Avenue; Akron, Ohio 44312; United States
- Coordinates: 41°3′12.20″N 81°26′4.40″W

Information
- School type: Public, secondary school
- School district: Akron Public Schools
- Principal: Kim Sabetta
- Teaching staff: 73.00 (FTE)
- Grades: 9–12
- Enrollment: 901 (2023-2024)
- Average class size: 30
- Student to teacher ratio: 12.34
- Language: English
- Campus: Urban
- Colors: Orange, White
- Athletics conference: Akron City Series
- Nickname: Orangemen
- Rivals: Springfield Spartans; Firestone Falcons; Tallmadge Blue Devils; Mogadore Wildcats
- Accreditation: Ohio Department of Education; North Central Association of Schools and Colleges
- Yearbook: The Profile
- Communities served: Ellet area of Akron, Ohio
- Website: https://ellet.akronschools.com/

Ellet Community Learning Center, formerly known as Ellet High School, is a public high school in Akron, Ohio. It is one of eight high schools in the Akron City School District. Ellet's daily enrollment for the 2012–2013 school year was 1,147.

== History and previous building (1950-2019) ==
The bulk of the land in the Ellet District was purchased in 1810 from Simon Perkins by three sons of Samuel Ellet, an early settler who moved into the area that year. The Ellet District was annexed to the city of Akron in 1929 and became part of Akron Public Schools the same year.

A new Ellet High School on Woolf Avenue opened in 1950. Additions to the school were built in 1957, 1975 and 1987. The school replaced the older Ellet High School on Canton Road, which had served both elementary and high school students since 1891. The school on Canton Road was closed and demolished in 2008 to make way for the new Ritzman Community Learning Center. It was originally Springfield High School, and became Ellet High School in 1929 when the land was annexed from Springfield. In 2019 the new Ellet Community Learning Center opened on the same land adjacent to the older high school. The Class of 2019 was the last graduating class to graduate from the existing high school. After 69 years, that building would be demolished in 2020.

== Current building (2019-present) ==
The new high school was completed and students began attending the new building at the start of the 2019-2020 school year. The 2020 class was the first to graduate from the new building but they did so in a drive-through ceremony because of the ongoing COVID-19 pandemic. The 2020-2021 school year began virtually because of the pandemic but would end in person with the first in-person graduation ceremony for the new building.

== Athletics ==
Ellet's official school colors are orange and white, although the varsity letter jackets and many of the team uniforms also feature navy blue. Ellet's mascot is the Orangeman. Current varsity sports for boys at the school include football, soccer, cross country, golf, wrestling, basketball, bowling, baseball, tennis, and track. Girls' varsity sports offerings include soccer, cross country, volleyball, basketball, bowling, softball, tennis, golf and track.

Ellet Football is currently a member of the Akron City Series League, and is Division II. In 2012, the football team won its first-ever outright City Series title, and qualified for the Ohio High School Athletic Association state playoffs for the second time in school history. In 2013, the football team repeated as outright City Series Champions return to the OHSAA state playoffs and went undefeated 10-0 for the first time since 1933 (7-0).

Ellet boys basketball team won the 2014-15 City Series Boys Basketball Championship for just the second time first since 1995 and second straight appearance losing in 2014.

=== State championships ===
- Boys Basketball - 1944
- Girls Softball – 1996
