= Forzano =

Forzano is a surname. Notable people with the surname include:

- Giovacchino Forzano (1884–1970), Italian playwright, librettist, stage director, and film director
- Rick Forzano (1928–2019), American football coach
