= George Knepper =

American historian

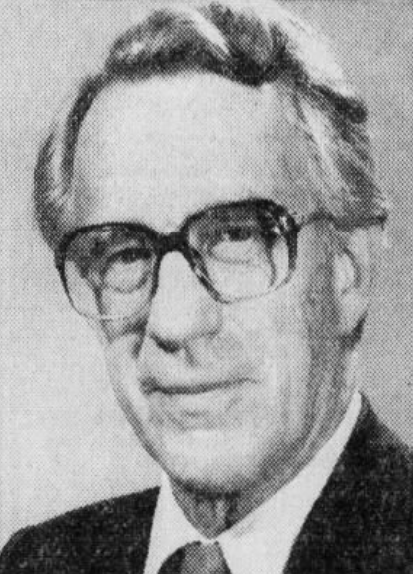
- Knepper in 1987
- Born: George W. Knepper Jr. January 15, 1926; Akron, Ohio, U.S.
- Died: October 20, 2018 (aged 92); Cuyahoga Falls, Ohio, U.S.
- Education: University of Akron; University of Michigan
- Occupation: Historian

George W. Knepper Jr. (January 15, 1926 – October 20, 2018) was an American historian.

== Life and career ==
Knepper was born in Akron, Ohio, the son of George Sr. and Grace Knepper. He attended Buchtel High School, graduating in 1943. After graduating, he served in the United States Navy during World War II, which after his discharge, he attended the University of Akron, earning his BA degree in history in 1948. He also attended the University of Michigan, earning his master’s degree in 1950 and his PhD degree in 1954.

Knepper served as a professor in the department of history at the University of Akron from 1954 to 1992. During his years as a professor, in 1987, he was named a distinguished professor.

== Death ==
Knepper died on October 20, 2018, in Cuyahoga Falls, Ohio, at the age of 92.
