= I Promise School =

Public school in Akron, Ohio

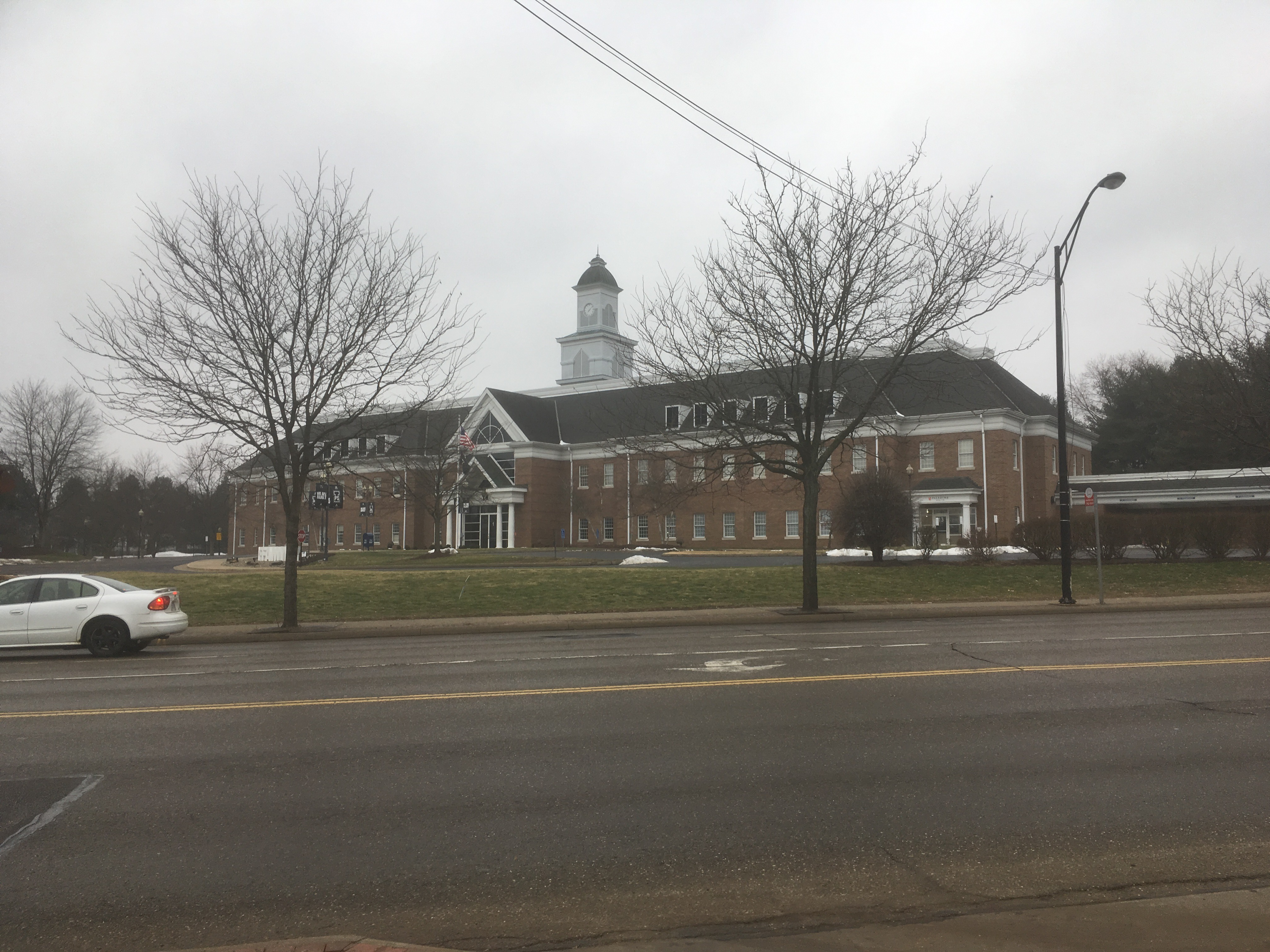
- Former administration building of Akron Public Schools

Location
- 400 West Market Street; Akron, Ohio 44303; United States; 41°05′29″N 81°31′51″W

Information
- Type: Public
- Motto: "We Are Family"
- Established: 2018
- Principal: Stephanie Davis
- Grades: 1 – 8
- Enrollment: 240
- Colors: Black and white
- Website: Official website

I Promise School (IPS) is a public elementary school in Akron, Ohio. Opened in 2018, it is supported by the LeBron James Family Foundation and specifically aimed at at-risk children. Opening with students attending grades three and four, the school became fully operational in 2022, teaching grades one through eight.

In April 2020, a documentary series titled I Promise was released on the streaming service Quibi, detailing the school's first year of operations. The series was cancelled due to Quibi's shutdown in October 2020.

== Background ==
In 2011, head of the foundation and professional basketball player LeBron James was researching the high school dropout rate of his hometown Akron and decided upon review to create the "I PROMISE" initiative, focused on supporting the youth in his childhood community. In November 2017, the Foundation expressed to the Akron school board their desire to create a school that aims to assist disadvantaged children with their studies. The plans were approved later that month and subsequent development of the school was initiated.

James, having grown up in Akron, struggled as a student due to unstable conditions at home. His mother was unsuccessful in finding a permanent job, forcing the family to move multiple times. During this time, James was absent for 83 days in fourth grade, resulting in a substantial lack of education. His upbringing served as a motivation to provide future generations of children with similar backgrounds with special support and care.

James considers the school's founding as the most important professional accomplishment of his life. The LeBron James Family Foundation is funding additional services for the children and families attending IPS. Some of these services include uniforms, food for families, career placement services, bikes and helmets for each student, transportation for qualified individuals, and GEDs and job placement services for parents according to Akron School District spokesman Mark Williamson.

Free tuition to the University of Akron for every graduating student is covered under the pre-existing Akron I Promise Network Scholarship, which was developed between the University of Akron, the LeBron James Family Foundation, and JPMorgan Chase in 2015. To qualify, Akron public school students must graduate high school with a minimum 3.0 grade point average. Additionally, the University of Akron provides eligible Akron Public School graduates full tuition under the separate Innovation Generation Scholarship. The Foundation has contributed an estimated $2 million in start up costs, though the number will change annually based on community needs. Students are selected based on test scores and other metrics and criteria, then placed in a lottery system.

Before the opening of IPS, the I Promise program had been in Akron elementary schools for more than 10 years. There are 32 elementary schools in the Akron Public School system and children from all those schools will now be in one location rather than spread across all of them. Prior to 2018, the IPS building had housed students in the school system that were displaced by schools which were being rebuilt.

The Akron School District will bear more than half of the costs once it is fully running. I Promise will eventually cost about $8 million a year to run out of the district's regular budget, covered mostly by shifting students, teachers, and money from other schools, the district says.

== Student body ==
The school is divided into "I Promise Elementary" and "I Promise Secondary", respectively teaching students from grade one to four up to grade eight. As of the first day of school on July 30, 2018, 240 students were attending grades three and four. The school was set to feature grades one and two by the following year and eventually all grades by 2022. The school is housed in the former Akron Public Schools' administration building and remains part of the Akron School District. Teachers are still on the district's payroll and curriculum is developed according to public school requirements.

The school deploys a STEM-based curriculum. "The Family Resource Center" and the school's "family plan" are aimed at the students' families to ensure a stable learning experience at home. Deviating from traditional timetables, school days last from eight to five. Summer vacation is shortened significantly and shorter breaks are scattered throughout the year instead.

After tests administered by the Northwest Evaluation Association, The New York Times reported that roughly 90% of its 240 inaugural students either met or exceeded their expected learning goals in both math and reading, making the school the district's most successful. Initially scoring in the lowest one-percentile in both fields, third and fourth graders respectively rose to the ninth and 16th percentile in reading, and to the 18th and 30th percentile in math. By the end of the school year, the school proved to be among the fastest growing performance-wise nationwide.

== Criticism ==
In 2018, annual costs of the school reportedly amounted to $8 million, which were by some perceived to be a burden on taxpayers living in the comparatively low-income school district. Parents who meet the criteria to enroll their children at the school but were unable to do so due to the school's lottery system were especially frustrated at the tax increase.

In July 2023, the school came under the scrutiny of the Ohio Department of Education for its deficient performance in the state's math and English tests. None of the eighth grade students for the 2023–2024 school year tested proficient in math in the previous three years, and in the preceding year only 8% of I Promise students tested proficient in English. The achievement component received an F grade, and the progress component—which measures growth of students based on past performance—received an A grade.

== See also ==
- Donda Academy, founded by Kanye West
- Oprah Winfrey Leadership Academy for Girls
- Prime Prep Academy, founded by former NFL player Deion Sanders
