= Garfield High School (Akron, Ohio) =

Location
- 1326 Brown Street; Akron, Ohio 44301; United States; 41°02′45″N 81°30′42″W

Information
- Type: Public
- Motto: "Enter to Learn, Leave to Serve"
- Established: 1926
- Closed: 2017
- School district: Akron Public Schools
- Enrollment: 751 (2014–15)
- Colors: Maroon and gold
- Athletics conference: Akron City Series
- Nickname: Golden Rams

Garfield High School was a public high school located in Akron, Ohio, United States. At the time of its closure in 2017, it was one of seven high schools in the Akron Public Schools. Athletic teams were known as the Golden Rams and competed as members of the Akron City Series.

The school, established in 1926, closed after the 2016–17 school year and was merged with Kenmore High School while the Garfield High School building was razed. The merged school, initially known as Kenmore–Garfield High School, was housed at the Kenmore High School building from 2017 to 2022 while a new facility was built on the site of Garfield High School. Upon moving to the new site in 2022, the school was renamed Garfield Community Learning Center.

== History ==
Plans for the school were first announced in late 1922. It was intended as a replacement for the existing South High School with the South High School building repurposed as a grade school. The plans were approved by the school board in February 1923 with an intended opening of September 1924. The decision to name the school after James A. Garfield, 20th President of the United States, came in April 1923 after the board had initially decided not to name it after Garfield. In December 1923, at the urging of Harvey S. Firestone, the founder of the Firestone Tire and Rubber Company and developer of the Firestone Park neighborhood where the school was being built, the school was nearly named for U.S. president Warren G. Harding, who had died a few months earlier in August. The board, however, elected not to change the name.

Opposition from parents in the area around South High School, followed by the election of four new school board members in late 1923, led to delays in approving plans and issuing construction bonds, and reducing the original budget and size of the building, with the board eventually agreeing to make it an additional high school rather than a replacement of South. Later delays came from additional reductions in the budget and further revisions to the building plans and a lawsuit over the bidding process. The case went before the Ohio Supreme Court, who ruled in December against the district and required them to reopen bidding before construction could begin. A second lawsuit was filed in early January 1925 with a permanent injunction granted in February, again related to irregularities in how contractors had complied with the specifications of the bid. Litigation was settled by May, resulting in further reductions in the budget and reducing the building to one wing of classrooms and an auditorium, with plans for a gymnasium and additional wing of classrooms in the near future. The contract was awarded May 28 and groundbreaking was held June 4, 1925. The contracts for the gym and athletic fields were awarded in late December, and the contract for the second classroom wing in March 1926.

Garfield High School opened for classes on September 7, 1926, and was formally dedicated on November 19. James R. Garfield, the son of the slain president, gave the principal address at the ceremony. Just one month after its dedication, though, the district nearly closed the high school to convert it to a junior high after an audit found that the district's six high schools had 3,000 more seats than they did students. Protests from students and the Firestone Park neighborhood, however, led the board to reverse the decision in January 1927. In 1966, Garfield High School became the first comprehensive high school in Akron when it opened an addition for vocational education facilities.

Garfield closed in 2017 at the end of the 2016–17 school year and merged with Kenmore High School for the 2017–18 school year due to declining enrollment and rising costs. While the new building was constructed at the Garfield site, the combined school at the Kenmore location was named Kenmore–Garfield, but retained Garfield's colors and the Golden Rams team name.

In May 2021, it was announced that the new building at the Garfield site would be called Garfield Community Learning Center, which the school board hoped would allow the Kenmore name to stay on a building in the Kenmore neighborhood.

== Demographics ==
In the 2011–2012 school year, the average enrollment was 880 students. The student body was 62.1% black (non-Hispanic), 26.1% white (non-Hispanic), 5.5% multi-racial, 3.9% Asian/Pacific Islander, and 2.0% Hispanic. 87.7% of the students were classified as economically disadvantaged, and 22.1% had learning disabilities.

== Notable alumni ==
- Dave Brown, professional football player in the National Football League (NFL)
- Delma Byron, actress
- Rick Forzano, head coach in college football and the NFL
- Dick Grecni, professional football player in the NFL
- Thomas Lewis, professional football player in the NFL
- Whitney Mercilus, professional football player in the NFL
- Ron Negray, professional baseball player in Major League Baseball
- Beanie Wells, professional football player in the NFL
- Antoine Winfield, professional football player on the NFL
- Ray Wise, actor, most known for his role in Twin Peaks
