= North High School (Akron, Ohio) =

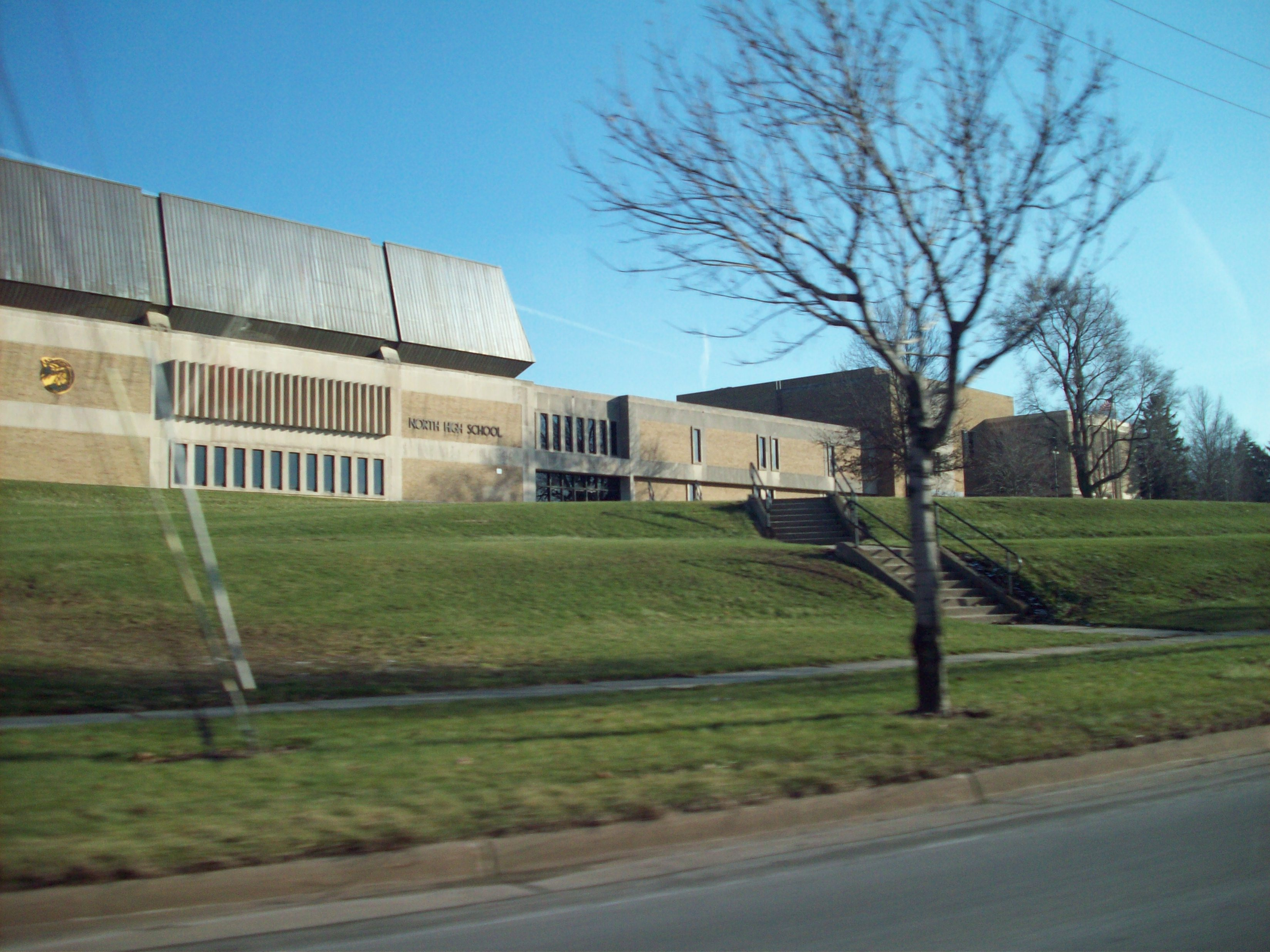
- North High School in 2007

Location
- 985 Gorge Boulevard; Akron, Ohio; USA; 41°06′14″N 81°29′53″W

Information
- Type: Public high school
- Established: 1917
- School district: Akron Public Schools
- Principal: Rachel Tecca
- Staff: 68.00 (on an FTE basis)
- Grades: 9-12
- Enrollment: 920 (2023–2024)
- Student to teacher ratio: 13.53
- Campus: Urban
- Colors: Black and Gold
- Athletics conference: Akron City Series
- Nickname: Vikings
- Newspaper: Viking
- Website: North High School web site

North High School is a public high school in Akron, Ohio. It is one of seven high schools in the Akron Public Schools district.

== History ==
North High School was established in 1915 as Akron's fourth high school, after Central, South, and West. The school was originally located at the northwest corner of Dayton Street and East Tallmadge Avenue in what later became Jennings Middle School, a building that stood until 2012. In 1931 the present North High School was built on Gorge Boulevard and housed students in grades 10–12.

Completion of the building was delayed 24 years because of the depression and two wars. In 1955 an auditorium, cafeteria, and gymnasium were added, followed by a vocational wing in 1970. The school expanded to serve grades 9–12 in September 1972.

The old building has art deco tilework on its exterior. The tilework features theme of brightly colored neighbors, stylized flowers, and images of pre-industrial humans depicted in industrious scenes.

== Sports ==
=== State championships ===
- Boys basketball – 1935, 1939
- Boys cross country – 1941, 1943, 1946, 1947, 1958
- Boys Track⁣ – 1956, 1996 (runner-up)

== Notable alumni ==
- Jack DiLauro, Major League Baseball pitcher
- John E. Dolibois, United States ambassador to Luxembourg from 1981 to 1985
- Mike Fox, National Football League defensive lineman
- Leonard Humphries, National Football League and Canadian Football League defensive back
- Gene Thomas, American Football League fullback
