= Leonard Humphries =

American football player (born 1970)

No. 23, 24, 21
- Position: Defensive back

Personal information
- Born: June 19, 1970 (age 56); Akron, Ohio, U.S.
- Listed height: 5 ft 9 in (1.75 m)
- Listed weight: 180 lb (82 kg)

Career information
- High school: North (Akron)
- College: Penn State (1988–1991)
- NFL draft: 1992: 8th round, 223rd overall pick

Career history
- Buffalo Bills (1992)*; Indianapolis Colts (1992)*; Tampa Bay Buccaneers (1993)*; Indianapolis Colts (1994); Ottawa Rough Riders (1996); BC Lions (1997, 1999); Toronto Argonauts (1999); Edmonton Eskimos (2000)*
- * Offseason or practice squad member only

Awards and highlights
- First-team All-East (1991); Second-team All-East (1990)

Career NFL statistics
- Tackles: 2
- Interceptions: 1
- Fumble recoveries: 1
- Stats at Pro Football Reference

Leonard Deshawn Humphries (born June 19, 1970) is an American former professional football player who was a defensive back for one season with the Indianapolis Colts of the National Football League (NFL). He was selected by the Buffalo Bills in the eighth round of the 1992 NFL draft after playing college football for the Penn State Nittany Lions. Humphries also played for the Ottawa Rough Riders, BC Lions and Toronto Argonauts of the Canadian Football League (CFL).

== Early life and college ==
Leonard Deshawn Humphries was born on June 19, 1970, in Akron, Ohio. He attended North High School in Akron.

Humphries was a member of the Nittany Lions of Pennsylvania State University from 1988 to 1991 and a three-year letterman from 1989 to 1991. He scored a punt return touchdown in 1989. He returned six interceptions for 129 yards and one touchdown in 1990, earning Associated Press (AP) second-team All-East honors. Humphries recorded two interceptions during the 1991 season and garnered AP first-team All-East recognition. He played in the East–West Shrine Game after his college career. He graduated from Penn State in 1992 with a Bachelor of Science in administration of justice.

== Professional career ==
Humphries was selected by the Buffalo Bills in the eighth round, with the 223rd overall pick, of the 1992 NFL draft. He officially signed with the team on July 2. He was released on August 25, 1992.

Humphries was signed to the practice squad of the Indianapolis Colts on September 30, 1992. He was released on October 21, 1992.

He signed with the Tampa Bay Buccaneers on March 1, 1993, but was later released on August 24, 1993.

Humphries signed with the Colts again on July 12, 1994. He played in 13 games for Indianapolis during the 1994 season, recording two solo tackles, one interception, and one fumble recovery. He was released on July 13, 1995.

Humphries was signed by the Ottawa Rough Riders of the Canadian Football League (CFL) on May 10, 1996. He dressed in all 18 games for the Rough Riders during the 1996 season, totaling 62 defensive tackles, eight special teams tackles, three interceptions for 73 yards and one touchdown, and five pass breakups. The Rough Riders folded after the 1996 season.

On March 12, 1997, Humphries was selected by the BC Lions of the CFL in a dispersal draft. He dressed in 17 games in 1997, recording 44 defensive tackles, one special teams tackle, three interceptions for 105 yards and one touchdown, one forced fumble, and nine pass breakups. He became a free agent after the 1997 season. After sitting out the 1998 season, Humphries signed with the Lions again on February 25, 1999. He was later released on June 26, 1999.

Humphries signed with the Toronto Argonauts on July 29, 1999. He dressed in one game for the Argonauts, posting three defensive tackles and one pass breakup, before being released on August 4, 1999.

Humphries signed with the CFL's Edmonton Eskimos in 2000 but was later released.

== Post-playing career ==
Humphries was a linebackers and defensive backs coach for nine years at Football University, a youth football training program. In 2017, he was the defensive backs coach for the China Arena Football League scouting combine. He became an assistant coach at Susquehanna University in 2018.

His son, Isaiah Humphries, also played for Penn State.
