= Kenmore High School =

Location
- 2140 13th Street S.W. Akron, Ohio 44314; United States; 41°02′45″N 81°33′29″W

Information
- Type: Public
- Opened: 1916
- Closed: 2017
- School district: Akron Public Schools
- Grades: 9–12
- Campus type: Urban
- Colors: Black and red
- Athletics conference: Akron City Series
- Team name: Cardinals
- Accreditation: Ohio Department of Education

Kenmore High School was a public high school in Akron, Ohio, United States. At the time of its closure in 2017, it was one of seven high schools in the Akron Public Schools. Athletic teams were known as the Cardinals and the school competed as a member of the Akron City Series.

The school closed after the 2016–17 school year and was merged with Garfield High School. The merged school, initially known as Kenmore–Garfield High School, was housed at the Kenmore High School building from 2017 to 2022 while a new facility was built on the site of Garfield High School. Upon moving to the new site, the school was renamed Garfield Community Learning Center.

== History ==
The original Kenmore High School was constructed in 1916. Population in the village of Kenmore grew rapidly, which resulted in an addition the next year. It was originally part of the Coventry Township District, but was annexed to the Akron Public Schools in 1929. The school housed elementary and high school students for many years. More additions were made to the school in 1952 and 1955. The oldest parts of the school were razed, and the current Kenmore High School was built in 1981.

Kenmore closed after the 2016–17 school year and was merged with Garfield High School for the 2017–18 school year due to declining enrollment and rising costs. While the new building was constructed at the Garfield site, the new combined school was named Kenmore-Garfield High School and was housed at the Kenmore High School building, where it was housed from August 2017 until May 2022.

In May 2021, it was announced that the new building at the Garfield site would be called Garfield Community Learning Center, which the school board hoped would allow the Kenmore name to stay on a building in the Kenmore neighborhood. The new Garfield Community Learning Center opened for classes in August 2022.

The original Kenmore High School building was demolished in 2025.

== Notable alumni ==
- Mike W. Barr - comic book and mystery writer
- Cliff Battles - professional football player and coach in the National Football League (NFL), Pro Football Hall of Fame inductee
- Don Buckey - professional football player in the NFL
- Rick Forzano - head coach for the Detroit Lions of the NFL
- Tim "Ripper" Owens - former lead singer of Judas Priest
- Gary Pinkel - college football head football coach for the University of Missouri
- Don Plusquellic - longest-serving mayor of Akron
