= Garfield Community Learning Center =

Location
- 1326 Brown Street; Akron, Ohio 44301; United States
- 41°02′45″N 81°30′40″W

Information
- Former name: Kenmore–Garfield High School
- Type: Public
- Opened: 2017
- School district: Akron Public Schools
- Principal: Frank Kalain
- Teaching staff: 72.50 (on an FTE basis)
- Grades: 9–12
- Enrollment: 971 (2022–2023)
- Student to teacher ratio: 23.39
- Campus type: Urban
- Colors: Maroon and gold
- Athletics conference: Akron City Series
- Team name: Golden Rams
- Accreditation: Ohio Department of Education
- Website: https://garfieldclchigh.akronschools.com/

Garfield Community Learning Center is a public high school in Akron, Ohio, United States. It is one of six high schools in the Akron Public Schools. The school's mascot is the Golden Rams. They are a member of the Akron City Series athletic conference.

== History ==
The school was established in 2017 as Kenmore–Garfield High School following the closure of Garfield High School and Kenmore High School. The two schools had been merged due to declining enrollment and rising costs. Akron Public Schools housed the merged school at the Kenmore High School building while the Garfield building was razed. The new school retained the Golden Rams mascot and maroon and gold colors of Garfield. Both schools were historic staples in the city of Akron. Kenmore High School dated back to 1908 when Kenmore was still a separate town, before being annexed into Akron in 1929. Garfield High School dated back to 1926 when it opened as Akron's sixth public high school.

From 2017 to the conclusion of the 2021–22 school year, the school was operated at the former Kenmore High School building in the Akron neighborhood of Kenmore while the current facility, part of the district's ongoing $800 million renovation and construction program that dates back to 2002, was built. The facility is 275,000 sq ft (25,500 m^{2}) and can hold about 1,400 students. In May 2021 the Akron Public Schools approved the name of Garfield Community Learning Center for the facility, which the school board hoped would allow the Kenmore name to stay on a building in the Kenmore neighborhood.

== Athletics ==
Garfield CLC athletic teams are known as the Golden Rams with school colors of maroon and gold. They compete as a member of the Akron City Series. The school colors and team name were carried over from the original Garfield High School and were also used during the few years the school was known as Kenmore–Garfield.
