= Whitney Mercilus =

American football player (born 1990)

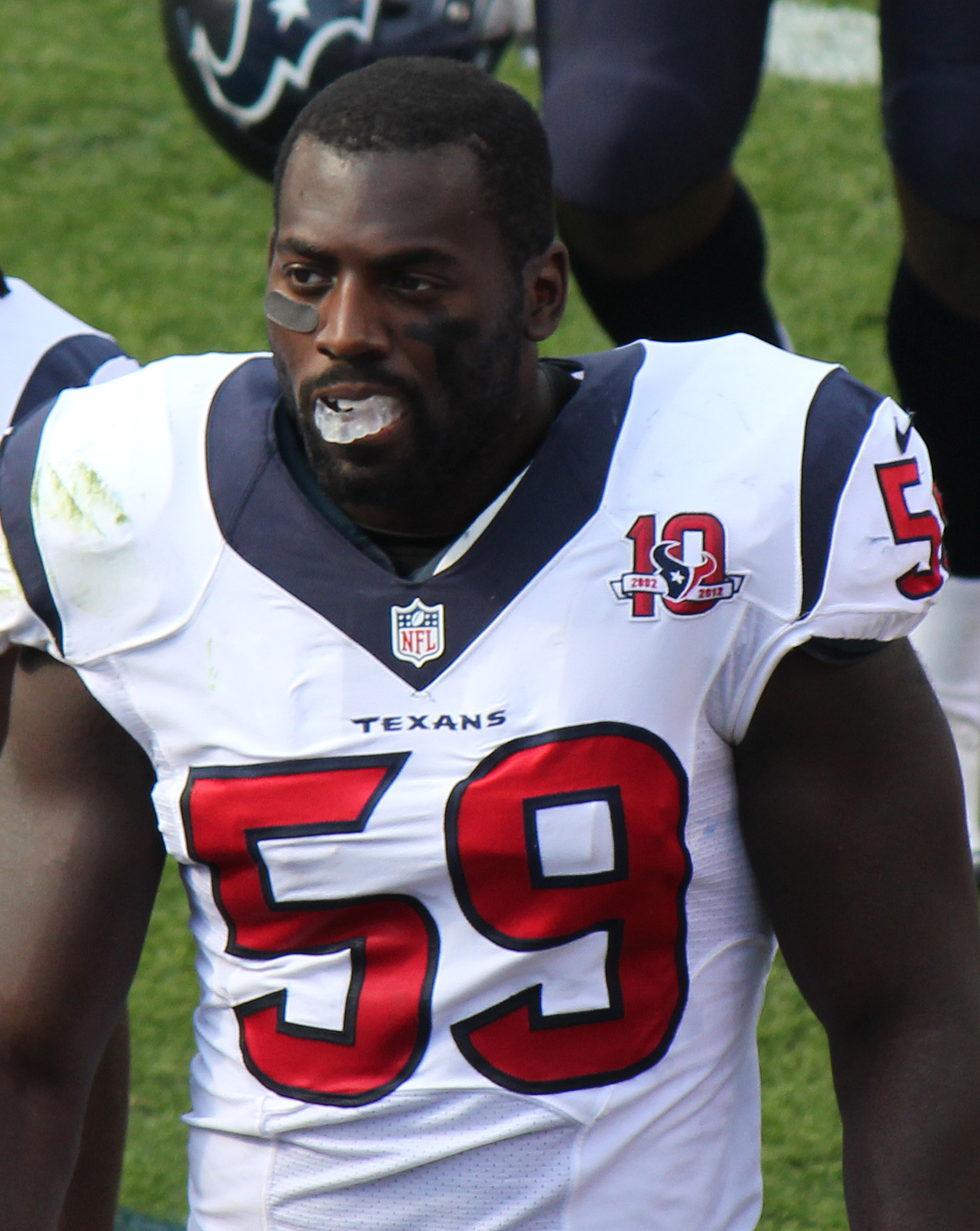
- Mercilus with the Houston Texans in 2012

No. 59, 50
- Position: Linebacker

Personal information
- Born: July 21, 1990 (age 36); Akron, Ohio, U.S.
- Listed height: 6 ft 4 in (1.93 m)
- Listed weight: 258 lb (117 kg)

Career information
- High school: Garfield (Akron)
- College: Illinois (2008–2011)
- NFL draft: 2012: 1st round, 26th overall pick

Career history
- Houston Texans (2012–2021); Green Bay Packers (2021)

Awards and highlights
- Second-team All-Pro (2016); Ted Hendricks Award (2011); Bill Willis Trophy (2011); Unanimous All-American (2011); First-team All-Big Ten (2011)

Career NFL statistics
- Total tackles: 362
- Sacks: 58.0
- Forced fumbles: 13
- Fumble recoveries: 9
- Interceptions: 2
- Stats at Pro Football Reference

Whitney Mercilus (MER-sih-lus; born July 21, 1990) is an American former professional football linebacker who played in the National Football League (NFL) for 10 seasons, primarily with the Houston Texans. He played college football for the Illinois Fighting Illini, winning the Ted Hendricks Award and the Bill Willis Trophy in 2011. Mercilus was selected in the first round of the 2012 NFL draft by the Texans, where spent the entirety of his first nine seasons and earned a second-team All-Pro selection in 2016. After being released by Houston early into the 2021 season, he last played for the Green Bay Packers.

== Early life ==
Mercilus is of Haitian descent, and was born in Akron, Ohio. He attended Garfield High School in Akron, where he played high school football for the Garfield High School Rams. He was considered a three-star defensive end prospect by the Rivals.com recruiting service.

== College career ==
Mercilus attended the University of Illinois Urbana-Champaign, where he played for head coach Ron Zook's Fighting Illini teams from 2009 to 2011. He broke out during his junior season in 2011, leading the country in quarterback sacks (16) and forced fumbles (9) while primarily playing at the defensive end position. At the conclusion of the 2011 season, Mercilus was a first-team All-Big Ten selection by both the coaches and media. He won the 2011 Ted Hendricks Award, 2011 Bill Willis Award, and 2011 CFPA Defensive Performer of the Year, in addition to being recognized as a unanimous first-team All-American.

== Professional career ==
=== Pre-draft ===
On January 3, 2012, Mercilus announced his decision to forgo his remaining eligibility and enter the 2012 NFL draft. He attended the NFL Scouting Combine and completed all of the combine drills. Mercilus finished with the fourth fastest time among all defensive ends in the 40-yard dash. On March 6, 2012, Mercilus attended Illinois' pro day, but opted to stand on the majority of his combine numbers. He performed positional drills and improved his time in the short shuttle (4.47s) and three-cone drill (7.03s). Whitney attended Detroit Lions, Cleveland Browns, Buffalo Bills, Jacksonville Jaguars, and Dallas Cowboys. At the conclusion of the pre-draft process, Mercilus was projected to be a first round pick by NFL draft experts and scouts. He was ranked as the third best defensive end prospect in the draft by DraftScout.com and was ranked the third best outside linebacker by NFL analyst Mike Mayock.

Pre-draft measurables
Height	Weight	Arm length	Hand span	Wingspan	40-yard dash	10-yard split	20-yard split	20-yard shuttle	Three-cone drill	Vertical jump	Broad jump	Bench press
6 ft 3 5/8 in (1.92 m)	261 lb (118 kg)	33 7/8 in (0.86 m)	9 1/4 in (0.23 m)	6 ft 6 7/8 in (2.00 m)	4.68 s	1.58 s	2.69 s	4.47 s	7.03 s	32 in (0.81 m)	9 ft 10 in (3.00 m)	27 reps
All values from NFL Combine/Pro Day

=== Houston Texans ===
==== 2012 season ====
The Houston Texans selected Mercilus in the first round (26th overall) of the 2012 NFL draft. Mercilus was the fifth defensive end drafted in 2012. He was the highest selected Illinois defensive lineman since Simeon Rice was selected third overall by the Arizona Cardinals in 1996. Immediately after the draft, Texans' defensive coordinator Wade Phillips stated that Mercilus would be moved to outside linebacker.

External videos
- Texans draft Whitney Mercilus 26th overall

On June 13, 2012, the Texans signed Mercilus to a four-year, $7.63 million contract that includes $6.20 million guaranteed and a signing bonus of $3.99 million.

Throughout training camp, Mercilus competed to be a starting outside linebacker against Connor Barwin and Brooks Reed after the role was left vacant by the departure of Mario Williams. Head coach Gary Kubiak named Mercilus a backup outside linebacker to start the regular season, behind Connor Barwin and Brooks Reed.

Mercilus made his NFL debut in the season-opening 30–10 victory over the Miami Dolphins. Through the first six games of the season, he mostly saw work on special teams. During Week 7, Mercilus recorded three combined tackles, broke up a pass, and made his first NFL sack during a 43–13 win against the Baltimore Ravens. Mercilus recorded his first sack for a four-yard loss on Ravens quarterback Joe Flacco and forced a fumble that was recovered by Ravens center Matt Birk during the first quarter. In Week 12, he collected a season-high four solo tackles during a 34–31 victory at the Detroit Lions. On December 2, 2012, Mercilus earned his first career start after Brooks Reed suffered a groin injury. Mercilus finished the Texans' 24–10 victory at the Tennessee Titans with two solo tackles and made a season-high two sacks on Titans' quarterback Jake Locker.

Mercilus finished his rookie year with 25 combined tackles (20 solo), six sacks, and a pass deflection in 16 games and four starts.

The Texans finished atop the AFC South with a 12–4 record and earned a playoff berth. On January 5, 2013, Mercilus appeared in his first NFL playoff game as the Texans defeated the Cincinnati Bengals 19–13 in the AFC Wildcard Game. The following week, the Texans were eliminated from the playoffs after a 41–28 road loss against the New England Patriots in the AFC Divisional Round.

==== 2013 season ====
Mercilus entered training camp slated as a starting outside linebacker after Connor Barwin departed in free agency. Head coach Gary Kubiak named Mercilus and Brooks Reed the starting outside linebackers to begin the regular season. They started alongside inside linebackers Brian Cushing and Joe Mays.

Mercilus started in the season-opener at the San Diego Chargers and recorded five solo tackles and one sack during a 31–28 victory. In Week 4, he collected six combined tackles and recorded a season-high 2.5 sacks as the Texans lost to the Seattle Seahawks 23–20. During Week 12, Mercilus collected a season-high six solo tackles during a 13–6 loss to the Jacksonville Jaguars. On December 6, 2013, the Houston Texans fired head coach Gary Kubiak after they fell to a 2–11 record. Defensive coordinator Wade Phillips was named the interim head coach for the rest of the season.

Mercilus finished his second professional season with 47 combined tackles (33 solo) and seven sacks in 16 games and starts.

==== 2014 season ====
On January 3, 2014, the Texans hired Penn State head coach Bill O'Brien. Defensive coordinator Romeo Crennel retained Mercilus as a starting outside linebacker. Mercilus started alongside Jadeveon Clowney and inside linebackers Brian Cushing and Jeff Tarpinian. During Week 9, Mercilus collected a season-high nine combined tackles and made two sacks during a 31–21 loss to the Philadelphia Eagles. He was inactive for the Texans' Week 15 loss at the Tennessee Titans due to a back injury.

Mercilus finished the 2014 season with 50 combined tackles (31 solo) and five sacks in 15 games and 13 starts.

==== 2015 season ====
On May 4, 2015, the Texans signed Mercilus to a four-year, $26 million contract extension with $10.68 million guaranteed and a signing bonus of $5.25 million. He entered training camp slated as a starting outside linebacker, but saw some minor competition from John Simon after he impressed coaches while filling in for Jadeveon Clowney during camp. Head coach Bill O'Brien retained Mercilus and Clowney as the starting outside linebackers to begin the regular season in 2015.

During Week 8, Mercilus collected a season-high seven combined tackles and recorded 3.5 sacks as the Texans defeated the Tennessee Titans by a score of 20–6. In the regular-season finale, he recorded five combined tackles and tied his season-high of 3.5 sacks during a 30–6 victory over the Jacksonville Jaguars. Mercilus finished the 2015 season with 52 combined tackles (32 solo), a career-high 12 sacks, and two pass deflections in 16 games and 10 starts.

The Texans finished atop the AFC South with a 9–7 record and earned a wildcard berth. On January 9, 2016, Mercilus started his first NFL playoff game and recorded eight combined tackles and sacked Chiefs quarterback Alex Smith thrice during a 30–0 loss to the Kansas City Chiefs in the AFC Wildcard Game.

==== 2016 season ====
Mercilus entered training camp slated as a starting outside linebacker. Head coach Bill O'Brien named Mercilus and Jadeveon Clowney the starting outside linebackers to begin the season, alongside Brian Cushing and Benardrick McKinney.

Mercilus started in the season-opening 23–14 victory over the Chicago Bears and recorded four combined tackles and made a season-high two sacks. Three weeks later, he collected a season-high seven combined tackles during a 27–20 victory against the Tennessee Titans. Mercilus was inactive for the Texans' Week 15 21–20 victory against the Jacksonville Jaguars after aggravating a back injury.

Mercilus finished the 2016 season with 53 combined tackles (36 solo), 7.5 sacks, and a pass deflection in 15 games and starts. Mercilus was awarded Second-Team All-Pro 2016 in recognition of his successful 2016 season.

The Texans finished atop the AFC South with a 9–7 record. On January 7, 2017, Mercilus recorded seven combined tackles and sacked Raiders quarterback Connor Cook twice as the Texans defeated the Oakland Raiders 27–14 in the AFC Wildcard Game. The following week, he made four combined tackles and a sack in a 34–16 road loss against the New England Patriots in the AFC Divisional Round.

==== 2017 season ====
Defensive coordinator Romeo Crennel retained Mercilus and Jadeveon Clowney as the starting outside linebackers in 2017. They started alongside Benardrick McKinney and Brian Cushing. In Week 3 against the New England Patriots, Mercilus recorded a season high five tackles and his first sack of the season on Tom Brady during the 36–33 loss. During Week 5, Mercilus suffered a torn pectoral during a 42–34 loss to the Kansas City Chiefs on Sunday Night Football. Three days later, the Texans officially placed him on injured reserve for the rest of the season.

Mercilus finished the season with 10 combined tackles (nine solo), a sack, and a forced fumble in five games and starts.

==== 2018 season ====
Mercilus made his return from injury in week 1 of the season against the New England Patriots. In the game, Mercilus recorded 2 tackles during the 27–20 loss. In week 7 against the Jacksonville Jaguars, Mercilus forced his first fumble of the season on Blake Bortles which was recovered by teammate Jadeveon Clowney. Later in the game, Mercilus recorded his first sack of the season on Cody Kessler during the 20–7 win. In week 12 against the Tennessee Titans, Mercilus recorded a season high 5 tackles and sacked Marcus Mariota 1.5 times during the 34–17 win.

After missing the majority of the previous season due to injury, Mercilus finished the 2018 season with 39 tackles, four sacks, and two forced fumbles in all 16 games played. In the wild-card round of the playoffs against the Indianapolis Colts, Mercilus recorded one tackle in the 21–7 loss.

==== 2019 season ====
In the season-opener against the New Orleans Saints, Mercilus sacked and intercepted Drew Brees in the narrow 30–28 road loss. During Week 2 against the Jacksonville Jaguars, Mercilus sacked Gardner Minshew twice and recorded two forced fumbles as the Texans narrowly won 13–12, earning him AFC Defensive Player of the Week. During Week 3 against the Los Angeles Chargers, Mercilus forced Philip Rivers to fumble the football once as the Texans won on the road by a score of 27–20. During Week 7 against the Indianapolis Colts, he recovered a fumble by quarterback Jacoby Brissett in the 30–23 road loss. During Week 15 against the Tennessee Titans, Mercilus intercepted a pass thrown by Ryan Tannehill off a deflection by Justin Reid and returned it for 86 yards during a 24–21 victory. In the next game against the Tampa Bay Buccaneers, he sacked Jameis Winston twice during the 23–20 road victory.

On December 28, 2019, the Texans signed Mercilus to a four-year, $53.5 million contract extension with $28.5 million guaranteed. In the AFC wild card game against the Buffalo Bills, he recorded a strip sack on quarterback Josh Allen which was recovered by teammate Jacob Martin during the 22–19 overtime win.

==== 2020 season ====
In Week 4 against the Minnesota Vikings, Mercilus recorded his first two sacks of the season on Kirk Cousins during the 31–23 loss. In Week 5 against the Jacksonville Jaguars, Mercilus recorded a sack and recovered a lost fumble during the 30–14 win. He was placed on the reserve/COVID-19 list by the team on November 5, and activated five days later. He was placed back on the COVID-19 list on December 25, 2020, and activated on January 13, 2021.

==== 2021 season ====
On October 19, 2021, Mercilus was released by the Texans after 10 seasons.

=== Green Bay Packers ===
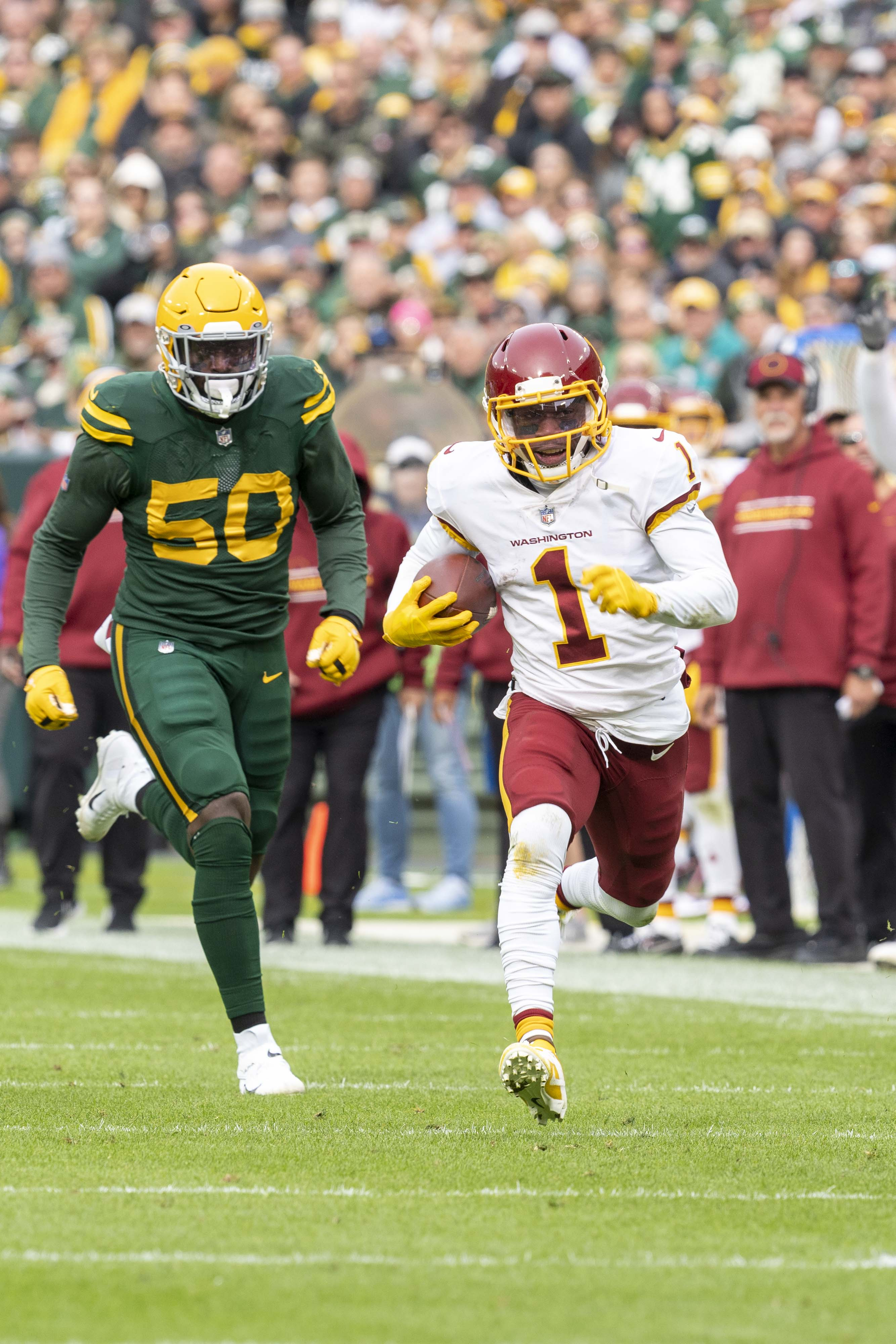
Mercilus (left) playing for the Packers in 2021.

On October 21, 2021, Mercilus signed with the Green Bay Packers. On November 14, he suffered a torn bicep during a Week 10 game against the Seattle Seahawks; the Packers placed him on injured reserve two days later. In 80 snaps over four regular season games with the Packers, Mercilus recorded 10 quarterback pressures, five tackles (three solo), and one sack. While initially expected to be lost for the year, Mercilus returned to practice following the regular season finale, and was officially activated from injured reserve on the eve of the team's divisional playoff game.

Mercilus announced his retirement from the NFL on April 6, 2022.

== NFL career statistics ==
Legend
**Bold**	Career high

Regular season statistics
Year	Team	Games		Tackles				Interceptions						Fumbles			
Year	Team	GP	GS	Cmb	Solo	Ast	Sck	Int	Yds	Avg	Lng	TD	PD	FF	FR	Yds	TD
2012	HOU	16	4	25	20	5	6.0	0	0	0.0	0	0	1	2	1	0	0
2013	HOU	16	16	47	33	14	7.0	0	0	0.0	0	0	0	2	0	0	0
2014	HOU	15	13	50	31	19	5.0	0	0	0.0	0	0	0	2	0	0	0
2015	HOU	16	10	52	32	**20**	**12.0**	0	0	0.0	0	0	**2**	1	2	5	0
2016	HOU	15	15	**53**	**36**	17	7.5	0	0	0.0	0	0	1	1	**4**	**7**	0
2017	HOU	5	5	10	9	1	1.0	0	0	0.0	0	0	0	1	0	0	0
2018	HOU	16	9	39	22	17	4.0	0	0	0.0	0	0	0	2	0	0	0
2019	HOU	16	16	48	33	15	7.5	**2**	**88**	**44.0**	**86**	0	**2**	**4**	1	2	0
2020	HOU	13	12	21	12	9	4.0	0	0	0.0	0	0	1	0	1	0	0
2021	HOU	6	2	12	6	6	3.0	0	0	0.0	0	0	0	0	0	0	0
2021	GB	4	0	5	3	2	1.0	0	0	0.0	0	0	0	0	0	0	0
Career		138	102	362	237	125	58.0	2	88	44.0	86	0	7	13	9	14	0

Postseason statistics
Year	Team	Games		Tackles				Interceptions						Fumbles			
Year	Team	GP	GS	Cmb	Solo	Ast	Sck	Int	Yds	Avg	Lng	TD	PD	FF	FR	Yds	TD
2012	HOU	2	0	2	1	1	0.0	0	0	0.0	0	0	0	0	0	0	0
2015	HOU	1	1	8	5	3	**3.0**	0	0	0.0	0	0	0	0	0	0	0
2016	HOU	2	2	**11**	**7**	**4**	**3.0**	0	0	0.0	0	0	**1**	0	0	0	0
2018	HOU	1	0	1	0	1	0.0	0	0	0.0	0	0	0	0	0	0	0
2019	HOU	2	2	5	3	2	1.0	0	0	0.0	0	0	0	**1**	0	0	0
2021	GB	1	0	0	0	0	0.0	0	0	0.0	0	0	0	0	0	0	0
Career		9	5	27	16	11	7.0	0	0	0.0	0	0	1	1	0	0	0

== Personal life ==
Mercilus is a Christian. Mercilus is the founder of the WithMerci Foundation, an organization that "advocates services and support for families of children with disabilities and special needs".
