= Gene Thomas =

American football player (1942–1993)

No. 45, 22
- Position: Fullback / Halfback

Personal information
- Born: September 1, 1942; Barberton, Ohio
- Died: August 27, 1993 (aged 50); Independence, Missouri

Career information
- College: Florida A&M

Career history
- Kansas City Chiefs (1966–1967); Boston Patriots (1968)

Career statistics
- Rushing attempts-yards: 130-401
- Receptions-yards: 23-184
- Touchdowns: 6
- Stats at Pro Football Reference

Eugene "Gene" Warren Thomas (September 1, 1942 – August 27, 1993) was an American football fullback and halfback in the American Football League and played in Super Bowl I. He attended North High School in Akron, Ohio, and played college football at Florida A&M University. During his pro-career, played for the Kansas City Chiefs and the Boston Patriots.

== Death ==
Thomas died from cardiomyopathy in his sleep on August 27, 1993, at his home in Independence, Missouri, 5 days before his 51st birthday.
