= Sheldon Ocker =

American sportswriter

- Born: August 22, 1942 (age 84); Akron, Ohio, U.S.
- Occupation: Sportswriter
- Employer: Akron Beacon Journal
- Awards: J. G. Taylor Spink Award

Sheldon Ocker (born August 22, 1942) is an American sportswriter.

== Early life ==
Ocker attended Buchtel High School in Akron, Ohio, graduating in 1960. He attended Ohio State University, and graduated with a degree in political science in 1964.

== Career ==
He worked for one year at the Sandusky Register, and was hired by the Akron Beacon Journal in 1967. For the Beacon Journal, he covered high school sports for three years, the Cleveland Cavaliers for ten years, and covered the Cleveland Indians from 1981 through 2013.

He was the President of the Baseball Writers' Association of America in 1985.

== Awards and honors ==
Ocker was named the 2018 winner of the J. G. Taylor Spink Award.
