= Buchtel Community Learning Center =

Public high school in Akron, Ohio, US

Location
- 1040 Copley Rd; Akron, Ohio 44320; United States; 41.085°N 81.560°W

Information
- Type: Public high school
- Established: 1931
- School district: Akron Public Schools
- Principal: Nicole Hughes
- Staff: 78.00 (on an FTE basis)
- Grades: 7 -12
- Enrollment: 903 (2023–2024)
- Average class size: 28
- Student to teacher ratio: 11.58
- Language: English
- Campus type: Urban
- Colors: Black, white, red, silver
- Athletics conference: Akron City Series
- Nickname: Griffins
- Website: buchtelclchigh.akronschools.com

John R. Buchtel Community Learning Center, formerly known as John R. Buchtel High School and often referred to as Buchtel High School or Buchtel CLC, is a public high school in Akron, Ohio, United States, serving grades 7–12. It is one of seven high schools in the Akron Public Schools district. As of 2012, the school has an enrollment of 764 students.

== History ==
Buchtel High School opened in 1931 and is named after Akron industrialist and philanthropist John R. Buchtel, who helped to organize and finance a number of early Akron firms, including the Goodrich Corporation. Buchtel is best known for his role in the establishment of Buchtel College, which later became the University of Akron. He and his wife contributed more than $500,000 to the college over his lifetime.

In 2012, the old Buchtel High School building was torn down after the completion of the new Community Learning Center. The school was designed to expand learning from grades 9–12 by including students in grades 7-8 who had previously attended Perkins Middle School. This was part of a larger project called Imagine Akron Community Learning Centers to rebuild or remodel all Akron Public Schools.

Starting in the 2012–2013 school year, the ninth and tenth graders participate in New Tech. The New Tech is a model used in the new ways of teaching which implements modern technology, such as laptops and Smart Boards into the curriculum. Based on a version of "Project Based Learning", students complete projects to show topic and subject mastery and to integrate new types of technology specifically used for teaching.

== Athletic state championships ==
- Boys' basketball - 2023
- Boys' football - 1987, 1988
- Boys' cross country - 1955, 1961
- Boys' swimming - 1963
- Boys' track - 1996, 2006
- Girls' track - 2007

== Notable alumni ==
- Billy Baldwin, former MLB player
- Jay Brophy (Class of 1979), former NFL player
- Levert Carr (Class of 1962), gridiron football player
- Rita Dove (Class of 1970), Pulitzer Prize-winning poet and former Poet Laureate Consultant in Poetry to the Library of Congress
- Michael Flaksman (Class of 1963), cellist, winner of the Casals Centenary Award
- Howard Hewett (Class of 1974), singer/songwriter (1974)
- Savannah James, businesswoman and wife of LeBron James
- George Knepper (Class of 1943), historian and university administrator
- Art Kusnyer (Class of 1964), former MLB player
- Chris Livingston (9th grade), professional basketball player
- Sheldon Ocker (Class of 1960), sportswriter
- Stanford Ovshinsky (Class of 1941), scientist and inventor
- Ricky Powers (Class of 1990), former NFL player and football head coach
- Tom Sawyer (Class of 1963), politician
- Paul Tazewell (Class of 1982), costume designer
- Bryan Williams (Class of 2005), football coach and former professional football player in the Canadian Football League
- Jarrod Wilson (Class of 2012), former NFL player
