= Akron Public Schools =

School district in Ohio, United States

Location
- 10 North Main Street Akron, Ohio, 44308; United States

District information
- Grades: PK–12
- Established: 1847
- School board: 7 members
- Chair of the board: Derrick Hall
- Schools: 44
- Budget: $559.6 million (2017-2018 School Year)
- NCES District ID: 3904348
- Affiliation: The Ohio 8

Students and staff
- Enrollment: 19,986 (2025–2026)
- Teachers: 1,513.62 (on an FTE basis) (2025–2026)
- Staff: 2,859.10 (on an FTE basis) (2025–2026)

Other information
- Website: www.akronschools.com

Akron Public Schools is a public school district that serves elementary and secondary students primarily in Akron, Ohio, United States, and small parts of neighboring Copley Township and Fairlawn. It is in Northeast Ohio, less than 40 miles (64 km) south of Cleveland and 20 miles (32 km) north of Canton. The district encompasses 54.4 sq mi (141 km^{2}) and includes, as of the 2024–25 school year, eight high schools, nine middle schools, 31 elementary schools, and three administration buildings. About 20,000 students are enrolled. The district employs 2,800 full-time and 1,700 part-time employees. Its annual budget exceeds $559 million.

== History ==
Planning of the district began in 1840, when Ansel Miller suggested to build free public schools for all children in the city, paid for by property taxes. After enduring much opposition by citizens, in 1843 Miller joined with Rev. Isaac Jennings. Three years later, Jennings became the chairman of a committee of citizens who discussed how to improve the school system. On November 21, 1846, their plan was approved unanimously by the citizens. The Ohio Legislature adopted the plan, called "An act for the support and better regulation of the Common Schools of the Town of Akron" on February 8, 1847. Akron's first public schools were established in the fall of 1847 and were led by Mortimer Leggett. The first annual report showed that it cost less than $2 a year to educate a child. In 1857 the cost of running the schools for a year was $4,200 (~$114,286 in 2025). The primary schools were taught by young women, which the Akron Board of Education justified because they could be paid less and were under the supervision of a male superintendent.

From 1877 to 1952, Akron graduated students semi-annually instead of annually. 9% of the city's school-aged population were born in other countries in 1888. In the 1920s, an Americanization program was designed to help the many Akron students who were first-generation Americans. Classes were in the rubber companies and some of the schools. A "continuation school" began for working boys and girls who were required by law to have at least four hours of schooling a week. In 1924, Akron's platoon schools attracted visitors from all over the country. Being a stronghold for the Ku Klux Klan during the decade, the majority of school board and government officials were members. Their influence ended with the arrival of Wendell Willkie.

During the city's 1950s boom town phase, Akron schools grew eight times faster than the city's population. In 1967, Kenmore launched the Air Force JROTC. In 1971, Jennings piloted the middle school model, which moved ninth-graders to the senior high school. In 1984, all-day kindergarten was piloted at Seiberling, Rankin and Hatton schools, and Ellet, East and Garfield high schools piloted the in-school suspension program. The district received an A+ evaluation from the state in 1987.

== Schools ==
Akron Public Schools is reconstructing its buildings. Through a partnership with the city of Akron and the Ohio School Facilities Commission, schools have been rebuilt or remodeled as "community learning centers" (CLCs), which operate as schools by day and community centers by night and on weekends. Twenty-nine CLCs are complete and an additional four are in the design or construction stage. The city is responsible for scheduling the use of these buildings after school hours.

=== High schools ===
- Akron Early College High School
- Buchtel Community Learning Center
- East Community Learning Center
- Ellet Community Learning Center
- Firestone Community Learning Center (Akron School for the Arts)
- Garfield Community Learning Center
- National Inventors Hall of Fame STEM High School
- North High School

Kenmore and Garfield High schools were merged and housed at the Kenmore location for the 2017–2018 school year as "Kenmore-Garfield" while the new building was constructed on the Garfield site. The new building opened in 2022 and is called "Garfield Community Learning Center".

=== Middle schools ===
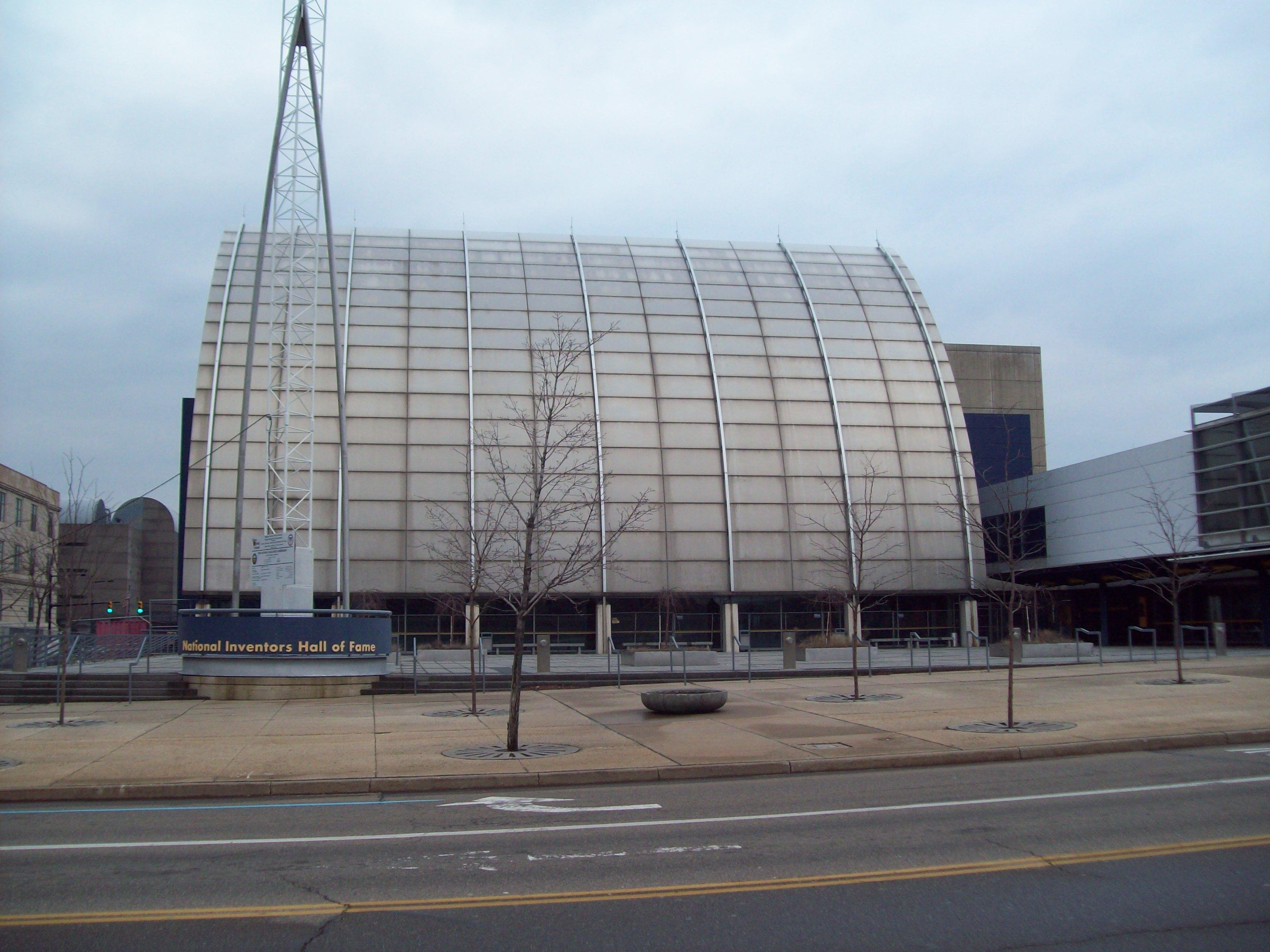
The National Inventors Hall of Fame, which houses the STEM Middle School

- Bridges
- Buchtel CLC 7-8 Campus
- East CLC 7-8 Campus
- Hyre CLC
- Innes CLC
- Jennings CLC
- Litchfield CLC (Precursor to the Akron School for the Arts)
- Miller South School for the Visual and Performing Arts (Precursor to the Akron School for the Arts)
- National Inventors Hall of Fame STEM Middle School

=== Elementary schools ===
- Arnold CLC
- Barber CLC
- Betty Jane CLC
- Bridges
- Case CLC
- Crouse CLC
- Findley CLC
- Forest Hill CLC
- Glover CLC
- Harris-Jackson CLC
- Hatton CLC
- Hill CLC
- King CLC
- Leggett CLC
- Mason CLC
- McEbright CLC
- Pfeiffer
- Portage Path CLC
- Resnik CLC (formerly Fairlawn Reserve Elementary)
- Rimer CLC
- Ritzman CLC
- Sam Salem CLC
- Schumacher CLC
- Seiberling CLC
- Voris CLC
- Windemere CLC

=== Specialty schools ===
- Adult Learning
- Akron Alternative Academy
- Akron Digital Academy-No longer affiliated with Akron Public Schools
- Akron Early College High School
- Akron Opportunity Center
- Akron Preparatory School-Not an Akron Public School {Ican Network}
- Akron School for the Arts (Firestone CLC)
- Bridges
- Evening High School
- Miller South School for the Visual and Performing Arts
- National Inventors Hall of Fame STEM High School
- National Inventors Hall of Fame STEM Middle School
- Olympus
- School of Practical Nursing (Closed June 2018)
- I Promise School

(Specialty School for At-Risk students.)

== Former schools ==
=== High schools ===
- Central High School — established in 1860 as Akron High School and renamed Central in 1911 when South High School was built. Closed in 1970 and merged with Hower Vocational to form Central-Hower High School
- Central-Hower High School (123 S. Forge St.) created in 1970 by the merger of Central High and Hower Vocational High. It was closed at the end of the 2005–06 school year. Building was later used as a temporary home for East High School and later for Buchtel High School, and then was home of the National Inventors Hall of Fame STEM High School until 2024.
- Garfield High School - built in 1926 - housed at 435 N Firestone Blvd - closed at the end of the 2016–17 school year and merged with Kenmore to create Kenmore-Garfield High School.
- Goodrich High School, established in 1934 by adding a freshman class to the existing Goodrich School and successive grades from there. In June 1937, the school board transferred all high school students to other high schools and made Goodrich a junior high school.
- Hower Vocational High School (130 W. Exchange St.) - named for M. Otis Hower (1858-1916), an Akron manufacturing leader. APS opened trade classes in Perkins Elementary in 1927 and renamed the building for Hower. It housed the Central-Hower student body after their merger in 1970 until a new building was completed in 1975; it was demolished in 1978.
- Kenmore High School - built in 1918 - housed at 2140 13th St. SW - closed at the end of the 2016–17 school year and merged with Garfield as Kenmore-Garfield High School.
- South High School (30 W. Thornton St. and 1055 East Ave.) established in 1911 as Akron's second high school, moved to new campus on East Avenue in 1956; closed at the end of the 1979–80 school year. Building was reopened in 1994 as an intermediate visual and performing arts school, renamed George C. Miller South School for the Visual and Performing Arts.
- West High School (315 S. Maple St.) was built in 1914, closed in 1953, and reopened as West Junior High School. The building closed in 1980 and became senior citizen apartments.

=== Middle schools ===
- Goodrich Middle School closed at the end of the 2008–09 school year. It was demolished in 2025.
- Goodyear Middle School closed in 2012 and was combined with the former East High School once construction of East CLC was completed. The building was demolished in 2025.
- Perkins Technology Middle School. Three buildings were constructed (1872, 1920, 1954). The second was renamed Hower Vocational School. The original building was torn down in 1949. It closed after housing Litchfield Middle School during construction after the spring of 2016.
- Roswell Kent Middle School closed in spring 2017.
- Riedinger Middle School closed at the end of the 2008–09 school year and became the Akron Opportunity Center
- Thornton Junior High School opened in 1956 at the former South High School after a new South High was built. Thornton closed in 1979 and the building was later demolished.
- West Jr. High School opened in 1953 in the former West High School. It closed in 1980 and the building was later renovated into apartments for senior citizens.

=== Elementary schools ===
- Allen Elementary School closed in 1967 and was demolished.
- Barret Elementary School closed at the end of the 2011–12 school year. The building is now occupied by Bridges Learning Center.
- Bettes Elementary School closed in spring 2017. It was demolished in 2023.
- Bryan Elementary School closed in 1978. It became Glenwood Jail, which also houses drug and alcohol rehabilitation services through Oriana House.
- Colonial Elementary School closed in 1964 and became part of the Sheet Metal Worker's Union for a number of years. It reopened in August 2013 as Colonial Preparatory Academy, a charter school serving students in Kenmore and West Akron.
- Crosby closed in 2004 and was used as the Akron Alternative School until it was demolished.
- Fairlawn Elementary School was demolished in 2006 and replaced by Judith Resnik Community Learning Center.
- Erie Island Elementary School closed at the end of the 2008–09 school year. The Akron School of Practical Nursing was moved into the building in 2009.
- Essex Elementary school Closed 2011-12 School year
- Firestone Park Elementary School closed at the end of the 2023–24 school year.
- Fraunfelter Elementary School closed in 1980 and now houses Oriana House Administrative Offices.
- Grace Elementary School became an antiques mall for a few years and then was demolished. The land now houses a car dealership.
- Guinther Elementary School closed in 1993 and was later demolished.
- Harris Elementary School closed to combine with Jackson as Harris-Jackson Community Learning Center.
- Heminger Elementary closed in 2008.
- Henry Elementary School on North Forge Street closed in 1978. The building was used as a daycare center for children of Summa Akron City Hospital employees until its demolition in 2007. The land now houses additions made to Summa Akron City Hospital in 2008.
- Hotchkiss Elementary School closed in 2007.
- Howe Elementary School closed in 1972 and was later demolished. The land that formerly housed the school was used in building the Akron Innerbelt.
- Jackson Elementary School was closed in 2007, and was later demolished. It combined with Harris to form Harris-Jackson Community Learning Center.
- Lane Elementary was demolished in 1980. Helen Arnold Community Learning Center, which opened in the fall of 2007, was built near the former school to serve students in the neighborhood.
- Lincoln Elementary School closed at the end of the 2008–09 school year.
- Lawndale Elementary School closed at the end of the 2015–16 school year.
- Margaret Park Elementary closed in 2007. Demolished in 2017.
- Miller Elementary School closed in 1978 and became administrative offices for Akron Public Schools.
- Rankin Elementary closed after the 2011–12 school year. Demolished in 2025.
- Robinson Community Learning Center closed at the end of the 2023–24 school year. It now houses the NIHF STEM High School.
- Smith Elementary School closed at the end of the 2015–16 school year.
- Spicer Elementary School, at 332 Carroll Street, closed in 1968 and became Spicer Hall at the University of Akron. The building was demolished in 1999.
- Stewart Elementary School closed at the end of the 2008–09 school year.
- Thomastown Elementary School now houses the Haunted Schoolhouse.

== Enrollment ==
1965	1970	1974-75	1980	1985	1990	1995	2000	2005	2010	2015	2019	2020	2023
52,632	55,000	49,835	38,974	35,037	33,230	31,072	30,360	27,764	23,210	21,001	20,723	20,669	19,897
