= East Community Learning Center =

Location
- 80 Brittain Road; Akron, Ohio 44305; United States; 41°3′52.51″N 81°28′7.00″W

Information
- Type: Public high school
- Motto: "Spirit Wins"
- School district: Akron Public Schools
- CEEB code: 360035
- Staff: 89.50 (on an FTE basis)
- Grades: 7-8 (middle school) 9-12 ( high school)
- Enrollment: 1,070 (2023–2024)
- Student to teacher ratio: 11.96
- Language: English
- Campus: Urban
- Colors: Scarlet and Gray
- Athletics conference: Akron City Series
- Nickname: Dragons
- Accreditation: Ohio Department of Education
- Yearbook: Minaret
- Communities served: Akron
- Website: eastclchigh.akronschools.com

East Community Learning Center (East CLC), formerly known as East High School, is a public high school in Akron, Ohio. It is one of seven high schools in the Akron Public Schools. The building serves students in grades nine through twelve as well as a middle school wing for grades seven and eight. A new construction project has taken place at the former location of the school, named The Heights. The Heights is an affordable apartment complex.

== History ==
The campus on Brittain Road opened in September 1955. The building replaced the previous home of East High School on Martha Avenue, which was rechristened as Goodyear Junior High School, later as Goodyear Middle School, and finally as the East Community Learning Center—Goodyear Campus in 2010.

From August 2008 to September 2010, students were temporarily relocated to the decommissioned Central-Hower High School, while the East High School building was renovated and expanded. The building reopened September 1, 2010 as the East Community Learning Center (ECLC). For the beginning of the 2010–2011 school year the building accommodated grades 9–12, though an addition to the ECLC building was completed by January 2011 and added students in grades 7 and 8 from the former Goodyear Middle School.

Around September to October 2025, the building started its demolition. And Akron Public Schools has been given around 1.6 million dollars to do so.

The building seems to have been auctioned off on August 21, 2019, According to Kiko Auctions.

== State championships ==
- Boys Cross Country – 1933, 1937

== Notable alumni ==
- William Gerstenmaier, aerospace and mechanical engineer, NASA administrator for Human Exploration and Operations
- James Ingram, musician
- Gene Michael, former professional baseball player, manager, and executive in Major League Baseball
- Gene Woodling, former professional baseball player in Major League Baseball
