= Firestone Community Learning Center =

Firestone High School

Location
- 470 Castle Blvd; Akron, Ohio 44313; United States; 41°07′05″N 81°33′56″W

Information
- Type: Public
- Motto: "Success is Our Tradition"
- Opened: 1963
- School district: Akron Public Schools
- Principal: Walter Noland
- Teaching staff: 82.00 (on an FTE basis)
- Grades: 9-12
- Enrollment: 1,085 (2023–2024)
- Student to teacher ratio: 13.23
- Language: English
- Colors: Green and gold
- Athletics conference: Akron City Series
- Nickname: Falcons
- Accreditation: Ohio Department of Education
- Newspaper: Firestone Focus
- Website: firestoneclc.akronschools.com/about-firestone

Firestone Community Learning Center (Firestone CLC), previously known as Harvey S. Firestone High School, is a public high school located on the northwest side of Akron, Ohio. It is one of seven high schools in the Akron Public Schools. The high school currently offers programs such as the Akron School for the Arts, International Baccalaureate Program, Project Lead The Way, Advanced Placement classes, and Firestone Theatre. Opened in 1963, Firestone is named after the founder of the Firestone Tire and Rubber Company, Harvey S. Firestone. Firestone has been named as one of the top 1,000 public high schools in the United States for its AP and IB programs by Newsweek in 2003, 2005, 2006, and 2007. Firestone opened a new building for the 2016–17 school year.

== State championships ==
- Boys Swimming - 1966, 1969, 1982, 1983

== Notable alumni ==
- Joseph Arthur, singer-songwriter-artist
- Dan Auerbach, guitarist and vocalist for The Black Keys
- Patrick Carney, drummer for The Black Keys
- Ralph Carney, avant garde saxophonist and clarinet player, singer, composer; member of Tin Huey, session multi-instrumentalist
- Phil "Flip" Boggs, gold medalist in springboard diving at 1976 Summer Olympics
- Keith Dambrot (born 1958), college basketball coach
- Tim Easton, singer-songwriter and artist
- Angie Everhart, model and actress
- Mark Gangloff, 2004 and 2008 Olympic gold medalist in swimming
- Lisa Howard, actress/singer
- Chrissie Hynde, leader of band The Pretenders, inducted into Rock and Roll Hall of Fame
- Melina Kanakaredes, actress
- Shammas Malik, Mayor of Akron
- Jonathon Marshall, Olympic swimmer
- Mark Mitten, Academy Award nominated film producer, Emmy Award winner
- Alan Myers, drummer for new wave band Devo
- Judith Resnik, second American woman in space, and second Jewish astronaut; killed in the Space Shuttle Challenger disaster in 1986
- Mark Schubert, head of U.S. swim team
- Rachel Sweet, pop singer and actress, attended Firestone High in 1970s and mentioned school in lyrics of "Who Does Lisa Like?" on 1978 album Fool Around
- Craig Yoe, publisher and designer
- Emilia Sykes, U.S. representative for Ohio's 13th congressional district
