= Rick Forzano =

American football coach (1928–2019)

Biographical details
- Born: November 20, 1928; Akron, Ohio, U.S.
- Died: January 10, 2019 (aged 90); Orlando, Florida, U.S.
- Education: Kent State

Coaching career (HC unless noted)
- 1951: Kenmore HS (OH) (assistant)
- 1952: Hower HS (OH) (assistant)
- 1953–1955: Hower HS (OH)
- 1956: Wooster (assistant)
- 1957–1958: Kent State (assistant)
- 1959–1963: Navy (assistant)
- 1964–1965: Connecticut
- 1966–1967: St. Louis Cardinals (OB)
- 1968: Cincinnati Bengals (OB)
- 1969–1972: Navy
- 1973: Detroit Lions (assistant)
- 1974–1976: Detroit Lions

Head coaching record
- Overall: 17–43–1 (college); 15–17 (NFL); 10–14–1 (high school)

Richard Eugene Forzano (November 20, 1928 – January 10, 2019) was an American football coach at the high school, collegiate and professional levels, most prominently as head coach of the National Football League (NFL)'s Detroit Lions from 1974 to 1976.

== Early life and career ==
Forzano was born November 20, 1928, in Akron, Ohio. He played football at Kenmore High School until he suffered a detached retina as a sophomore, which ended his playing days. He enlisted in the Marine Corps but was medically discharged as a result of the injury that left him with 20/400 vision in one eye.

He enrolled at Kent State University and began coaching at Akron area high schools. A 1951 stint at Kenmore High School was followed one year later by a season at Hower High School. In 1953, he was promoted to head coach at Hower, where he stayed three seasons and compiled a 10–14–1 record. He completed his bachelor's degree in 1951 and his master's degree in 1955.

== Coaching career ==
In 1956, he began his college coaching career an assistant at the College of Wooster before spending two seasons as a backfield coach at Kent State University.

In 1959, he began a five-year stretch as an assistant with Navy under Hall of Fame coach Wayne Hardin. As an assistant, he helped recruit Heisman Trophy winner and Hall of Fame quarterback Roger Staubach to Navy. Navy went to two college bowl games, the 1961 Orange Bowl and the 1964 Cotton Bowl while he was on the staff.

Success at Navy led to his first college head coaching position at the University of Connecticut in 1964. Over two years, he compiled a 7–10–1 record for the Huskies, but was named as the Yankee Conference coach of the year in his first season.

In 1966, he moved up to become an NFL coach with the first of two seasons as the St. Louis Cardinals' offensive backfield coach. Returning to Ohio in 1968, he served one year in that same role as a Cincinnati Bengals assistant under Paul Brown. On January 15, 1969, he then took the head coaching position at the U.S. Naval Academy.

After putting together a 10–33 record with three defeats against rival Army, Forzano resigned on February 1, 1973, to become an assistant coach with the Detroit Lions under Don McCafferty, who had worked with him at Kent State in the late 1950s. Forzano became the interim head coach after McCafferty's death from a heart attack on July 28, 1974, just before the start of exhibition play and was named as the coach for the remainder of the season a few days later. After the 1974 season in which the team finished 7–7, the Lions signed him to a three-year contract to coach the team. Forzano gave Bill Belichick his first full time coaching job with the Detroit Lions. Forzano and Belichick had known each other for many years, as Forzano coached with his father Steve Belichick at Navy and had briefly lived with the Belichick family in 1959.

Forzano was known as a strict disciplinarian. However, Forzano was unable to lead the team to a winning record and was forced to resign on October 4, 1976, after the team lost three of its first four games. Forzano finished his Lions' tenure with a 15–17 record and never returned to coaching, focusing on his own company, Rick Forzano Associates. The company, based in Detroit, serves as a manufacturer's sales representative. Forzano also served as a commentator for Big Ten Conference football games.

== Head coaching record ==
=== College ===
Year	Team	Overall	Conference	Standing	Bowl/playoffs
Connecticut Huskies (Yankee Conference) (1964–1965)
1964	Connecticut	4–4–1	3–1–1	3rd	
1965	Connecticut	3–6	2–2	T–3rd	
Connecticut:		7–10–1	4–3–1		
Navy Midshipmen (NCAA University Division independent) (1969–1972)
1969	Navy	1–9			
1970	Navy	2–9			
1971	Navy	3–8			
1972	Navy	4–7			
Navy:		10–33			
Total:		17–43–1			

=== NFL ===
Team	Year	Regular season					Postseason			
Team	Year	Won	Lost	Ties	Win %	Finish	Won	Lost	Win %	Result
DET	1974	7	7	0	.500	2nd in NFC Central Division	-	-	-	
DET	1975	7	7	0	.500	2nd in NFC Central Division	-	-	-	
DET	1976	1	4	0	.250	3rd in NFC Central Division	-	-	-	
DET Total		15	18	0	.455		-	-	-	
