= South High School (Akron, Ohio) =

Location
- 30 West Thornton Street; Akron, Ohio 44311; United States; 41°04′08″N 81°32′54″W

Information
- Type: Public
- Established: 1911
- Closed: 1980
- School district: Akron Public Schools
- Grades: 9–12
- Language: English
- Campus type: Urban
- Colors: Blue & white
- Athletics conference: Akron City Series
- Team name: Cavaliers, Big Blue
- Accreditation: Ohio Department of Education

South High School was a public high school in the Akron Public Schools that served the city of Akron, Ohio, from 1911 until its closure at the end of the 1979–80 school year. It was the second public high school to open in Akron. School colors were blue and white and athletic teams were known as the Cavaliers or Big Blue. They competed in the Akron City Series for their entire existence.

== History ==
South High School opened in 1911 at 30 West Thornton Street at Coburn and was the second public high school established in the Akron Public Schools and first since the original Akron High School was established around 1850. The school moved to a new building and campus on East Avenue in 1956. Once the building at 1055 East Avenue was finished, the original building became Thornton Junior High School and housed grades seven through nine until its closure at the end of the 1978–1979 school year. The building at West Thornton and Coburn was eventually demolished in 1979 and the land now houses an Aldi's discount supermarket. After South was closed in 1980, it reopened in 1993 as the Miller South School for the Visual and Performing Arts. It was named in honor of Akron's first African-American principal, George C. Miller.

== State championships ==
- Boys cross country – 1939

== Notable alumni ==
- Ara Parseghian, Cleveland Browns football player and Notre Dame football coach
