= Gottlob Linck =

German mineralogist (1858–1947)

Gottlob Eduard Linck (20 February 1858, Ötisheim – 22 December 1947, Jena) was a German mineralogist.

From 1879, he studied at the polytechnic college in Stuttgart, followed by classes at the Universities of Strasbourg and Tübingen. In 1888 he was habilitated for mineralogy and petrography at Strasbourg, where in 1894, he became an associate professor. Later the same year, he was named professor of mineralogy and geology at the University of Jena, a position he maintained until his retirement in 1930. On five occasions, he served as university rector at Jena.

His wide-ranging research covered many facets of geology and mineralogy. He examined the various properties of lime, gypsum and dolomite, and investigated the adsorption of potassium by clay minerals, especially kaolin. In 1893 he demonstrated that twinning was the cause of Neumann lines found in hexahedrite. His interest in chemical problems associated with geology led to his creation of the journal Chemie der Erde.

Linck was a founding member of the German Mineralogical Society and served as editor of its journal Fortschritte der Mineralogie, Kristallographie und Petrographie (since 1911).

== Selected works ==
- Grundriss der kristallographie für studierende und zum selbstunterricht, 1908 - Outline of crystallography for students and self-study.
- Die Bildung der Kalksteine und Dolmite, 1922 - On limestone and dolomite.
- Grundriss der Mineralogie und Petrographie; eine Einführung für Studierende und zum Selbstunterricht, (with Hermann Jung), 1935 - Outline of mineralogy and petrography, an introduction for students and self-study.

With Eugen Korschelt, Max Verworn, Friedrich Oltmanns, Karl Schaum, Hermann Theodor Simon and Ernst Teichmann, he was co-author of the Handwörterbuch der naturwissenschaften.
