= German Zoological Society =

The German Zoological Society (German: Deutsche Zoologische Gesellschaft; abbr. DZG) is a learned society in Germany, founded in 1890 at Frankfurt am Main. It is registered as a non-profit organisation (German: eingetragene Verein) based in Munich.

== Activities ==
The DZG represents German-speaking zoologists and corresponds with other regional and national zoological societies. It represents the interests of zoology among the scientific learned societies and can be consulted by politicians for advice. Membership is open to any zoologist or student of zoology; the DZG currently has about 1500 members. It organises an annual meeting, which until 2004 was held during the week of Pentecost. However, as many universities no longer have a recess during that period, since 2005 the date of the meeting has been decided by the host university.

The DZG publishes its own scientific journal, Frontiers in Zoology, founded in 2004. It is published in cooperation with the online publisher BioMed Central. The DZG formerly published the Zoologische Anzeiger and Zoologische Jahrbücher, since discontinued.

The DZG awards several prizes to support or recognise scientific work.

== Karl Ritter von Frisch Medal ==
The Karl Ritter von Frisch Medal is a scientific prize of the DZG. The Medal has been awarded every two years since 1980, to scientists who have distinguished themselves through outstanding zoological work that integrates knowledge from numerous biological disciplines. It is the most prominent scientific prize for zoology in Germany, with an award sum of 10,000 Euros.

List of medallists:

- 1980 Franz Huber, behavioral science
- 1982 Werner Nachtigall, bionics
- 1984 Otto Kinne, marine ecology
- 1986 Martin Lindauer, behavioral science
- 1988 Thomas Eisner, biology and chemical ecology
- 1990 Gerhard Neuweiler, zoology, neuro- and sensory physiology
- 1992 Herbert Jäckle, biophysics
- 1994 Rüdiger Wehner, zoology and behavioral science
- 1996 Bert Hölldobler, behavioral science, socbiology, evolutionary ecology
- 1998 Peter Berthold, ornithology
- 2000 Walter J. Gehring, developmental biology and genetics
- 2002 Friedrich G. Barth, neurobiology
- 2004 Randolf Menzel, neurobiology
- 2006 Martin Heisenberg, neurobiology
- 2008 Gerhard Heldmaier, animal physiology
- 2010 (no award)
- 2012 Horst Bleckmann, neuro-, sensory, and behavioral physiology
- 2014 Charlotte Helfrich-Förster, neurobiology
- 2016 Diethard Tautz, molecular biology
- 2018 Stanislav N. Gorb, bionics
- 2021 Jürgen Heinze, evolutionary biology
- 2022 Thomas Bosch, developmental biology

== Horst Wiehe Dissertation Prize ==
The Dissertation Prize of the Horst-Wiehe-Stiftung has been awarded every two years at the DZG Annual Meeting since 1991, to an outstanding doctoral or habilitation thesis on a zoological subject. The prize sum is 2000 Euros (formerly 4000 Deutsche Mark).

- 2021 Fabrizia Ronco (Universität Basel, CH)
- 2019 Manon Schweinfurth (University of St Andrews, UK)
- 2017 Markus Lambertz (Universität Bonn)
- 2015 Alexander Blanke (Hull, UK)
- 2013 Jan Clemens (Princeton, NJ)
- 2011 Joachim Haug (Universität Ulm)
- 2009 Sandra Steiger (Universität Freiburg)
- 2007 Lutz Fromhage (Universität Hamburg/Bristol)
- 2005 Martin Fanenbruck (Universität Bochum)
- 2003 Wolfgang Forstmeier (Universität Würzburg)
- 2001 Klaus Fischer (Universität Bayreuth)
- 1999 Sylvia Ortmann (Universität Marburg)
- 1997 Erhard Strohm (Würzburg)
- 1995 Thomas Lubjuhn (Bonn)
- 1993 Heike Hadrys (Braunschweig/Yale)
- 1991 Henning Schneider (Konstanz/Harvard)

== Werner Rathmayer Prize ==
The Werner Rathmayer Prize is a special prize for original work in zoology, within the Jugend forscht competition for young scientists. It has been awarded annually since 2004. The recipient receives a prize of 500 Euros and free admission to the DZG Annual Meeting in the following year.

- 2021 Benjamin Palm (Heiligenhaus)
- 2019 Falco Eigner (Chemnitz)
- 2017 Stefan Kemmerich (Wipperfürth)
- 2016 Nora Siefert (Hannover)
- 2015 Thomas Lindner (Neumarkt in der Oberpfalz)
- 2014 Freia-Raphaella Lorenz (Bayreuth)
- 2013 Antonia Trede (Kiel)
- 2012 Linda Marx (Chemnitz)
- 2011 Miriam Kreß & Louise Hildebrand (Schlüchtern)
- 2010 Lisa Hallex (Freiberg)
- 2009 Jessica Oberheim (Bensheim)
- 2008 Johannes Dill (Dresden)
- 2007 Wieland Heim (Chemnitz)
- 2006 Markus Neumann (Chemnitz)
- 2005 Sascha Hoinkiss (Schwanewede)
- 2004 Daniel Schütz (Kemmern)

== Presidents of the DZG ==
- 1890/91 Rudolf Leuckart (1822–1898)
- 1892/93 Franz Eilhard Schulze (1840–1921)
- 1894/95 Ernst Ehlers (1835–1925)
- 1896/97 Otto Bütschli (1848–1920)
- 1898/99 Franz Eilhard Schulze
- 1900/01 Hubert Ludwig (1852–1913)
- 1902/03 Carl Chun (1852–1914)
- 1904/05 Johann Wilhelm Spengel (1852–1921)
- 1906/07 Richard Hertwig (1850–1937)
- 1908/09 Ludwig von Graff (1851–1924)
- 1910/11 Friedrich Zschokke (1860–1936)
- 1912/13 Eugen Korschelt (1858–1946)
- 1914/15 Karl Heider (1856–1935)
- 1916/17 Max Braun (1850–1930)
- 1918/19 Willy Kükenthal (1861–1922)
- 1920/21 Ludwig Döderlein (1855–1936)
- 1922/23 Valentin Haecker (1864–1927)
- 1924/25 Hans Lohmann (1863–1934)
- 1926 Ludwig Rhumbler (1864–1939); from 1926 the President was replaced by their first deputy at the end of the year
- 1927 Richard Hesse (1868–1944)
- 1928 Karl von Frisch (1886–1982)
- 1929 Jan Versluys (1873–1939)
- 1930 Waldemar Schleip (1879–1948)
- 1931 Max Hartmann (1876–1962)
- 1932 Carl Zimmer (1873–1950)
- 1933 Fritz Baltzer (1884–1974), resigned his position because he was not a German citizen, replaced by Paul Buchner
- 1934 Paul Buchner (1886–1978)
- 1935 Ernst Matthes (1889–1958)
- 1936 Ernst Matthes left Germany on political grounds for Coimbra and was replaced by Wilhelm Josef Schmidt
- 1936/37 Wilhelm Joseph Schmidt (1884–1974)
- 1938/39 Albrecht Hase (1882–1962)
- 1940 Hermann Weber (1899–1956)
- 1941 Hans-Jürgen Stammer (1899–1968)
- 1942 Otto Mangold (1891–1962)
- 1943–45 Adolf Remane as acting president
- 1949/50 Albrecht Hase
- 1951/52 Wulf Emmo Ankel (1897–1983)
- 1953/54 Bernhard Rensch (1900–1990)
- 1955/56 Otto Koehler (1889–1974)
- 1957/58 Curt Kosswig (1903–1982)
- 1959/60 Alfred Kaestner (1901–1971)
- 1961/62 Friedrich Seidel (1897–1992)
- 1963/64 Adolf Remane (1898–1976)
- 1965/66 Manfred Gersch (1909–1981)
- 1967/68 Erich Reisinger (1900–1978)
- 1969/70 Martin Lindauer (1918–2008)
- 1971/72 Friedrich Schaller (1920–2018)
- 1973/74 Günther Osche (1926–2009)
- 1975/76 Ernst Florey (1927–1997)
- 1977/78 Dietrich Neumann (1931–2012)
- 1979/80 Johann Schwartzkopff (1918–1995)
- 1981/82 Jürgen Boeckh (1934–)
- 1983/84 Klaus Immelmann (1935–1987)
- 1985/86 Hans Schneider (1929–2023)
- 1987/88 Bernt Linzen (1931–1988)
- 1989/90 Werner Rathmayer (1937–2003)
- 1991/92 Hans-Rainer Duncker (1933–)
- 1993/94 Franz Huber (1925–2017)
- 1995/96 Klaus Peter Sauer (1941–2022)
- 1997/98 Gerhard Heldmaier (1941–)
- 1999/00 Albrecht Fischer (1937–)
- 2001/02 Gerhard Neuweiler (1935–2008)
- 2003/04 Barbara König (1955–)
- 2005/06 Diethard Tautz (1957–)
- 2007/08 Johann-Wolfgang Wägele (1953–)
- 2009/10 Wolf-Michael Weber (1954–)
- 2011/12 Hermann Wagner (1953–)
- 2013/14 Constance Scharff (1959–)
- 2015/16 Susanne Dobler (1956–)
- 2017/18 Stefan Richter (1964–)
- 2019/21 Jacob Engelmann
- 2022/23 Gabriele Uhl

== Honorary members ==
- Wulf Emmo Ankel
- Carl Apstein
- Walther Arndt
- Hansjochem Autrum
- Fritz Baltzer
- Paul Buchner
- Reinhard Dohrn
- Ernst Ehlers
- Manfred Gersch
- Alexander Goette
- Richard Goldschmidt
- Hermann Grenacher
- Karl Grobben
- Ernst Hadorn
- Ernst Haeckel
- Max Hartmann
- Albrecht Hase
- Karl Heider
- Wolf Herre
- Konrad Herter
- Richard Hertwig
- Richard Hesse
- Franz Huber
- Otto Kinne
- Eugen Korschelt
- Curt Kosswig
- Alfred Kühn
- Robert Lauterborn
- Rudolf Leuckart
- Franz von Leydig
- Martin Lindauer
- Konrad Lorenz
- Alexander Luther
- Paul Mayer
- Ernst Mayr
- Günther Osche
- Heinz Penzlin
- Bernhard Rensch
- Wilhelm J. Schmidt
- Franz Eilhard Schulze
- Johann Schwartzkopff
- Friedrich Seidel
- Hans Spemann
- Karl von Frisch
- Rüdiger Wehner
- August Weismann
- Wolfgang Wieser
- Otto zur Strassen

== Networking ==
The Society is a member of the Deutschen Nationalkomitee Biologie (DNK), representing the interests of life scientists in international organisations. It is also a member of the Verband Biologie, Biowissenschaften und Biomedizin in Deutschland e.V. (VBIO), which represents bioscientists in Germany.

== Jena Declaration ==
→ main article: Jena Declaration

At its annual meeting in September 2019, the DZG approved and released the Jena Declaration, which stated that "the concept of [human] race is the result of racism, not its prerequisite." The Declaration was authored by Martin S. Fischer, Uwe Hoßfeld, Johannes Krause, and Stefan Richter.

The statement characterised the division of humanity into races as social and political stereotyping, resulting from and supported by an anthropological construct on the basis of arbitrarily chosen features like hair and skin colour. This construct has served to justify open and hidden racism and its consequences.

== See also ==
- Frankfurt Zoological Society
