= Max Verworn =

German physiologist (1863–1921)

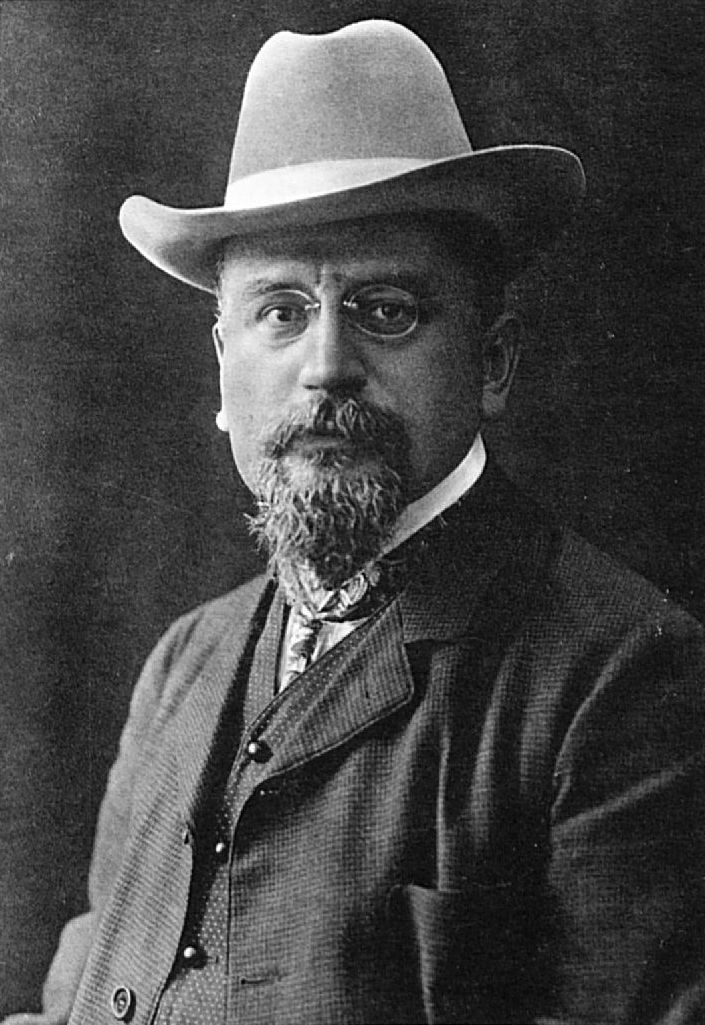
- Max Verworn (1863-1921)
- Born: 4 November 1863
- Died: 23 November 1921 (aged 58)
- Education: Berlin, Jena
- Known for: Work in cellular physiology
- Awards: Carus Prize of the Deutsche Akademie der Naturforscher Leopoldina (first recipient)
- Scientific career
- Fields: Physiology
- Institutions: University of Jena, University of Göttingen University of Bonn

Max Richard Constantin Verworn (4 November 1863 – 23 November 1921) was a German physiologist who was a native of Berlin.

He studied medicine and natural sciences in Berlin, and later moved to Jena, where he furthered his studies with Ernst Haeckel (1834–1919) and William Thierry Preyer (1841–1897). In 1895 he became a professor at the University of Jena, and in 1901 a professor at the physiological institute at Göttingen. Later, as successor to Eduard Pflüger (1829–1910), he became a professor at the University of Bonn (1910). In 1902 he founded the journal Zeitschrift für Allgemeine Physiologie (Journal of General Physiology), and was its publisher until his death in 1921.

Max Verworn is remembered for his research in the field of experimental physiology, and especially for his work involving cellular physiology. He did extensive studies of the elementary physiological processes that take place in muscle tissue, nerve fibers and sensory organs. He conducted research in the fields of phylogenesis and ontogenesis. Verworn was influenced by Haeckel's theory of evolutionism and considered that all physiological phenomena seen in higher animals may already be recognizable in the most basic forms of life.

In his opposition to the concept of causalism, he proposed "conditionalism" to describe a state or process determined by totality of its processes.

He undertook investigations into human creativity and thought processes. In his studies of art, he believed that there were two types of style and aims of artistic representation. These two concepts he called "physioplastic" and "ideoplastic". He described physioplastic as direct reproduction of the object or its immediate image in memory, and ideoplastic as an intuitive attempt to create what the eye sees.

He was the first recipient of the Carus Prize from the "Deutsche Akademie der Naturforscher Leopoldina" (or the National Academy of Germany) in 1896 for his work in the area of physiology.

== Selected written works ==
- Psychophysiologische Protistenstudien, 1889 - Psychophysiological protist studies.
- Die Bewegung der lebendigen Substanz, 1892 - Movement of the living substances.
- Allgemeine Physiologie, 1895 - General physiology.
- Die Biogenhypothese, 1903 - The biogenic hypothesis.
- Naturwissenschaft und Weltanschauung, 1904 - Science and philosophy.
- Die Mechanik des Geisteslebens, 1907 - Mechanics of spiritual life.
- Zur Psychologie der primitiven Kunst, 1907 - Psychology of primitive art.
- Die Frage nach den Grenzen der Erkenntnis, 1908 - The question on the limits of knowledge.
- Die biologischen Grundlagen der Kulturpolitik. Eine Betrachtung zum Weltkriege., II Auflage, Jena, 1916.

With Eugen Korschelt, Gottlob Eduard Linck, Friedrich Oltmanns, Karl Schaum, Hermann Theodor Simon and Ernst Teichmann, he was co-author of the Handwörterbuch der naturwissenschaften.
