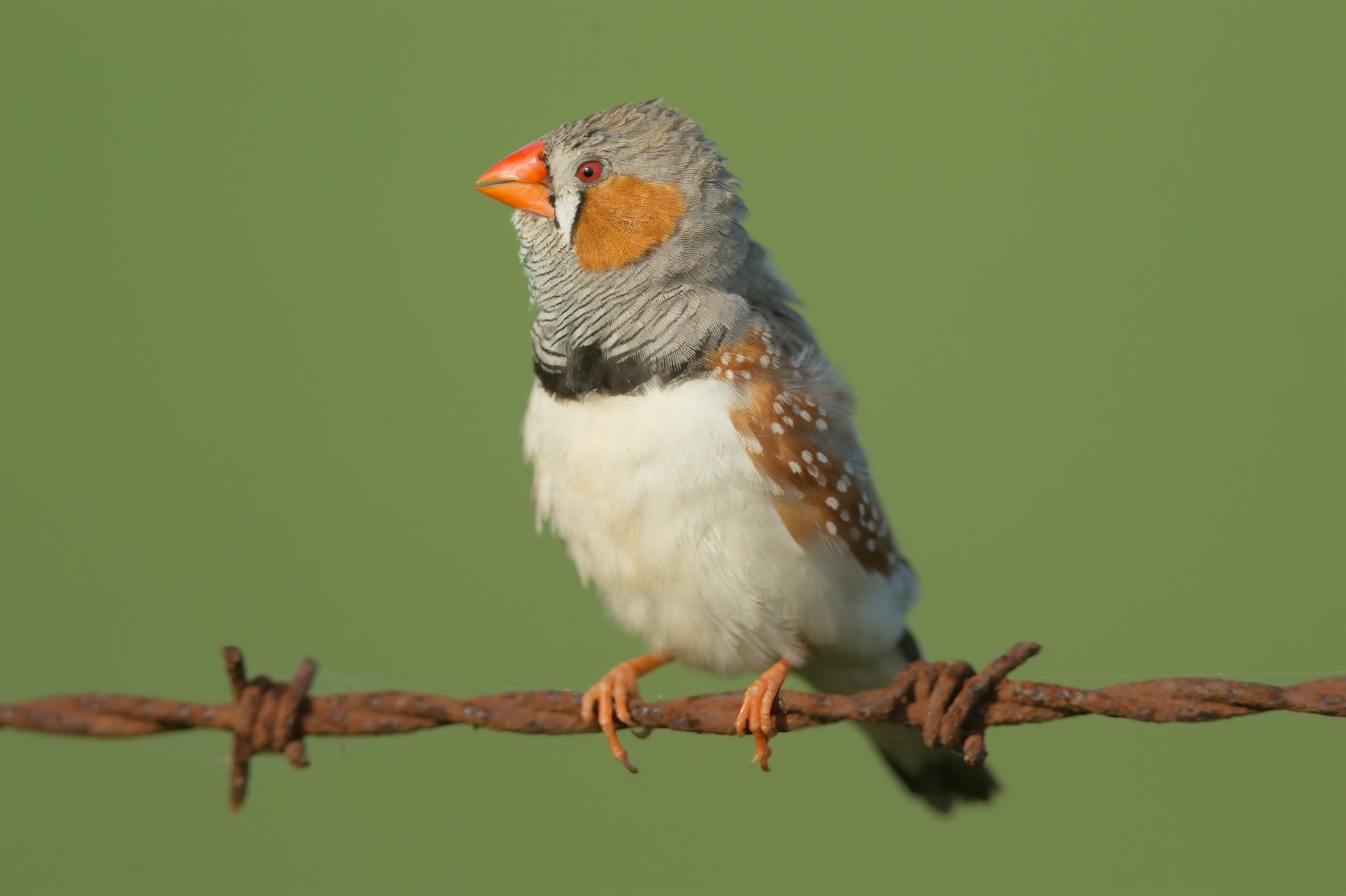

Conservation status
- Least Concern (IUCN 3.1)

Scientific classification
- Kingdom: Animalia
- Phylum: Chordata
- Class: Aves
- Order: Passeriformes
- Family: Estrildidae
- Genus: Taeniopygia
- Species: T. castanotis

Binomial name
- Taeniopygia castanotis (Gould, 1837)

Synonyms
- Poephila guttata castanotis Taeniopygia guttata castanotis

Audio

= Australian zebra finch =

Species of bird

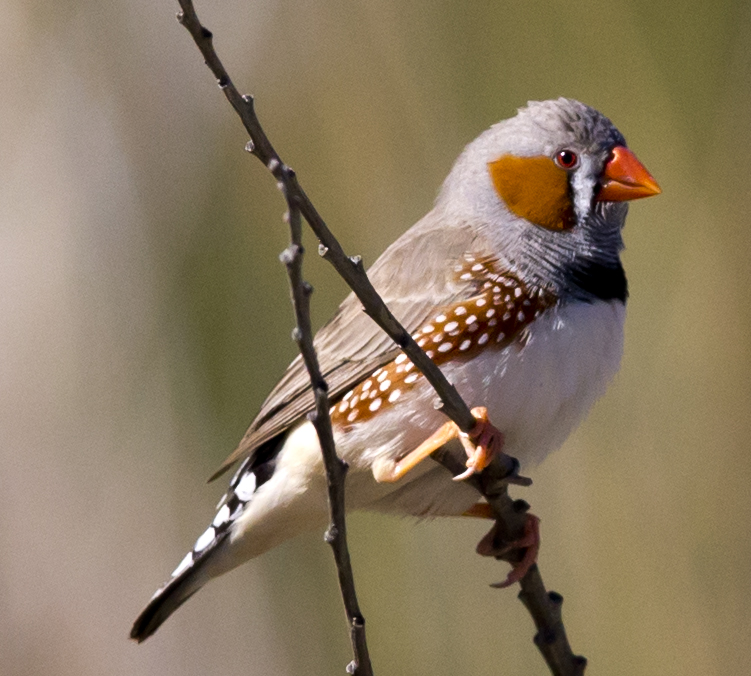
Male in Karratha, Western Australia

The Australian zebra finch (Taeniopygia castanotis) is the most common estrildid finch of Central Australia. It ranges over most of the continent, avoiding only the cool humid south and some areas of the tropical far north. The bird has been introduced to Puerto Rico and Portugal. Due to the ease of keeping and breeding the zebra finch in captivity, it has become Australia's most widely studied bird; by 2010, it was the most studied captive model passerine species worldwide, by a considerable margin.

== Taxonomy and phylogeny ==
The Australian zebra finch was described in 1837 by John Gould as Amadina castanotis, about two decades after the Sunda zebra finch (T. guttata) was described. For over a century and a half, the Australian and Sunda zebra finches were classified as a single species, Taeniopygia guttata. They were split by the IUCN Red List and BirdLife International in 2016. The International Ornithological Congress followed suit in 2022 based on studies noting differences in plumage, mtDNA divergence, and assortative mating between both species in captivity.

It is likely that the Australian zebra finch evolved first, with the Sunda zebra finch descending from Australian zebra finches blown out to sea during the Pleistocene.

== Habitat and distribution ==
The Australian zebra finch has the most extensive mainland distribution of the Australian estrilids, being found in about 75% of mainland Australia. The species is generally not found on the coasts, except for the arid western edge.

The Australian zebra finch is generally found in more arid areas. The areas it chooses to occupy are close to water, and places where rain is concentrated after it falls. However, this is likely more related to the abundance of vegetation than the abundance of water as a resource in itself. Within these areas, it is found in grasslands with scattered trees and shrubs, and in open or grassy woodlands. It is also found in cultivated areas, such as rice fields. It usually stays confined to the low coastal areas of the islands it inhabits, but it can move to elevations up to 2,300 metres (7,500 ft) to exploit expanding cultivation and grasslands.

Although Australian zebra finch breeding, for example, is initiated by rainfall, Klaus Immelmann proposed that sustained heavy precipitation is detrimental to the zebra finch. This is supported by the observation that the nest does not shield the chicks or eggs from rain, and rainfall can sometimes result in clutches being abandoned. Furthermore, it is supported by Immelmann's finding that zebra finches left Wyndham after the first heavy rains in November 1959, but returned to breed in April. It is hypothesised that birds in parts of northern Australia migrate inland during the wet season from October to May, and return to the coastal regions during the dryer months.

== Life cycle ==
The life expectancy of an Australian zebra finch is highly variable because of genetic and environmental factors. The zebra finch may reach up to five years in its natural environment. If they are kept caged, they normally live for 5 to 9 years but may live as long as 12 years, with an exceptional case of 14.5 years reported for a caged specimen. The greatest threats to captive zebra finch survival are predation by cats and loss of natural food.

== Song and other vocalisations ==
Australian zebra finches are loud and boisterous singers. Their calls can be a loud beep, meep, oi! or a-ha!. Their song is a few small beeps, leading up to a rhythmic song of varying complexity in males. Each male's song is different, although birds of the same bloodline will exhibit similarities, and all finches will overlay their own uniqueness onto a common rhythmic framework. Due to their extremely fine temporal-auditory discrimination, the zebra finch is able to recognise and respond to micro-auditory details nested within their calls which human ears cannot detect.

Sons generally learn the song of their fathers with little variation. There is a critical sensitive period during which juvenile males learn their songs by imitating a mature, male tutor. Subsong (early, poorly structured vocalisations) evolve into 'plastic song'. This plastic song is variable between renditions but begins to incorporate some recognisable elements of tutor songs. A study conducted by Nottebohm et al., has shown that birds were able to successfully imitate their tutor's song after relatively short exposure (40 playbacks of the motifs lasting 30 seconds total) over the duration of their sensitive learning period. These birds eventually form a "template" of what their correct song should sound like. They rely on auditory feedback for both song learning and practice as juveniles and song maintenance as adults. Adult birds maintain their songs by correcting any deviations from their target song template. During adulthood, by around 90 days, the bird's song goes through a crystallisation phase where their song template is stable and it no longer changes. The learning process can be delayed by exposure to traffic noise.

Male Australian zebra finches begin to sing at puberty, while females lack a singing ability. This is due to a developmental difference, where in the embryo, the male zebra finch produces testosterone, which is transformed into estradiol in the brain, which in turn leads to the development of the nervous system for a song system. There are multiple areas of the brain involved in the production of song. When a bird is singing a learned song, the HVC projects to the robust nucleus of the archistriatum (RA), which itself projects to the hypoglossal motoneurons. These motoneurons control the muscles of the trachea and syrinx. When learning a new song, the HVC sends efferents to Area X in the lobus parolfactorius, which connects to the medial nucleus of the dorsolateral thalamus (DLM). This structure connects to the lateral magnocellular nucleus of the anterior neostriatum (LMAN), which projects to the RA, and continues like a normal learned song would. The function of the various areas involved in learning is still being investigated. Area X is likely involved in the acquisition of a new song, whereas the LMAN likely serves a key role in the plasticity necessary for learning. Activation of song behaviour later depends on androgens.

Because Australian zebra finch males learn their songs from their surroundings, they are often used as avian model organisms to investigate the neural bases of learning, memory, and sensorimotor integration. For example, studies have investigated the role of FoxP2 in song learning and have found that in young finches both knockdown and overexpression of FoxP2 in the striatal song control nucleus, Area X, prevents accurate song learning and tutor imitation. These studies also have implications for human speech. Individuals heterozygous for a point mutation in FOXP2 manifest a speech disorder. Because of similar expression patterns between humans and songbirds, the Australian zebra finch is used as a model to study FoxP2 expression and function. The zebra finch genome was the second bird genome to be sequenced, in 2008, after that of the chicken.

The Australian zebra finch uses an acoustic signal to communicate to embryos. It gives an incubation call to its eggs when the weather is hot—above 26 °C (79 °F)—and when the end of their incubation period is near. This call alters the growth and behaviour of the chicks, with chicks that were given an incubation call having less mass at the end of the nestling phase when they experienced higher nest temperatures. This contrasts with chicks that were not given an incubation call, which have a higher mass at the end of nestling after being exposed to high nest temperatures. Additionally, the chicks called to as an embryo are more likely to call after experiencing high nest temperatures.

Calling behaviour is used by Australian zebra finches to negotiate parental care duties. In an experiment that delayed the return of the males to the nest, it was found that the resulting duets were shorter and calls were made more often. This is the first species that vocal negotiation over parental care has ever been reported.

== Behaviour ==
=== Breeding ===
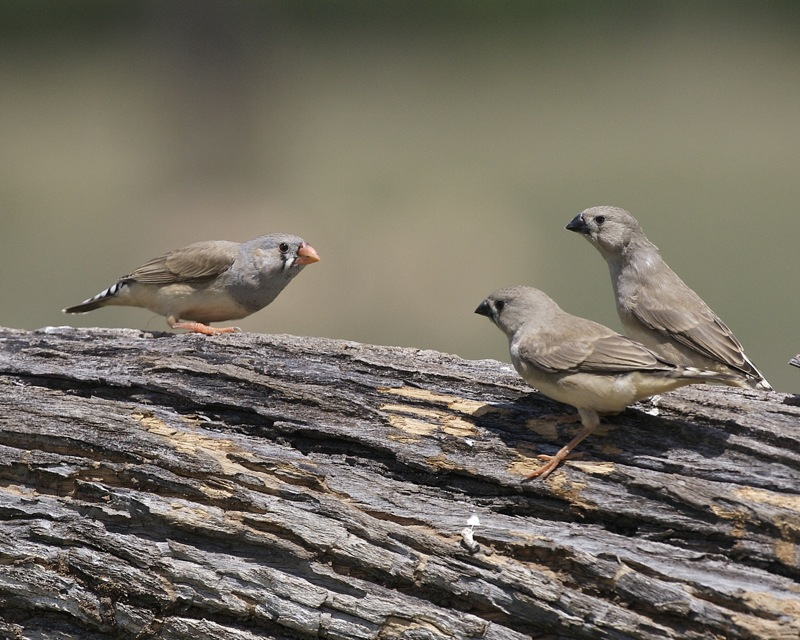
Female with two juveniles in New South Wales, Australia

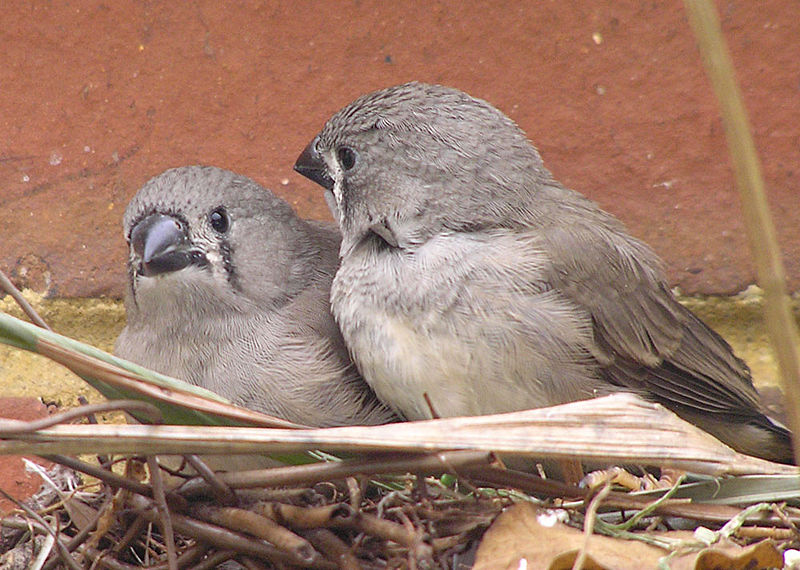
Juvenile zebra finches

The Australian zebra finch generally breeds in loose colonies of up to 50 nests (although the number of individuals in a colony can be up to about 230 when breeding, and around 350 when not), but it may nest solitarily. It usually places its nest in a thorny shrub or tree, although it will nest in other structures, natural and artificial. Often, there are multiple nests in one shrub.

In non-arid parts of Australia, colonies are often occupied year-round. During cold days in the non-breeding season, members of these colonies usually feed in flocks for about two hours, breaking up into small groups to rest, preen, sing, and court before foraging again in a large flock until about one hour before sunset, when they return to the colony. On warmer days, some of the small groups return to the colony to build nests and perform their normal activities. During the breeding season, finches finding or building a nest often return after about an hour of feeding, and on cold days they are joined by those incubating or brooding young. Pairs that have not yet laid their eggs sometimes elect to court and mate in special "courting trees" before joining the flock. In the afternoon, most pairs engage in social activities, which often take place at "social trees". The zebra finch frequently does not breed where it was born; of the ringed birds that bred in the Danaher breeding colony (36°09′S 145°26′E) from 1985 to 1989, 24% of them were hatched from the colony or in the immediate vicinity. This natal dispersal is not sex-biased, unlike in most passerines. However, males between 36 and 50 days of age are more likely to disperse than females, although after this age, more females disperse than males. Predation is likely a major factor in coloniality; nests in the main colony suffer less predation than nests further away. Pairs with preyed-upon nests are significantly more likely to nest in a bush more than 20 metres (66 ft) away from their previous nesting plant. Another large factor is where others nest: individuals are more likely to nest closer to conspecifics. In addition, reproductive success of conspecifics may play a role in where individuals nest; a study published in 2012 found that this finch was more likely to breed near nests with chicks older than six days (used as a proxy for reproductive success because they fledge about 87% of the time).

The Australian zebra finch builds both a roosting and breeding nest. The former is dome-shaped, has a large entrance on the side, and lacks an entrance tunnel. This nest helps the zebra finch conserve body heat (likely through its roof and walls and by allowing birds to huddle together): an individual in a roosting nest saves about 18% of the energy of one outside. The breeding nest (which generally ranges from about 12 to 24 centimetres (4.7 to 9.4 in) in length) has a small entrance followed by a tunnel about three to five centimetres (1.2 to 2.0 in) in diameter and up to eight centimetres (3.1 in) in length, which conceals the contents of the nest, leading to the egg chamber, which has (from the outside) a diameter of 12 to 20 centimetres (4.7 to 7.9 in); the latter two are separated by a raised lip, preventing eggs from rolling out. This chamber often sits on an old nest; otherwise, a foundation consisting of many short, stiff stems over horizontal branches is constructed. The walls of the nest range in thickness from one to three centimetres (0.39 to 1.18 in), with an outer layer of longer stiff and rough grass stems and an inner layer of shorter soft and fine stems. The egg chamber is also lined with soft material, such as wool and feathers. Both sites are defended during the day; but while a desperate bird is sometimes let in to the roosting nest during the night, the breeding nest is always guarded.

The Australian zebra finch is an opportunistic breeder, initiating reproductive behaviour about one to three months after water becomes available. This is so that the young hatch when semi-ripe and ripe seeds (their primary food) become available. This finding is in line with the food quality hypothesis of zebra finch breeding, which states that dry grass seed is inadequate as a food source for nestlings, and that higher quality food (like ripening seeds) is needed to sustain them. Thus, in captivity, it can breed year round when provided with sufficient water, and it may attempt to breed several times per breeding season. Zebra finches are socially monogamous, with pair bonds lasting until the death of one of the partners, after which the widowed bird re-pairs. Extra-pair copulation, mating with individuals other than one's mate, occurs occasionally, with females usually soliciting it. Extra-pair parentage is relatively rare in the wild, accounting for about 2% of young. Attempts at forced extra-pair copulations by males occur frequently (about 43.8% of the time in one study); but, females can always successfully resist forced copulations if they so choose.

There are multiple hypotheses as to why extra-pair copulation might have evolved. One theory is the good genes theory, which states that a female chooses extra-pair copulation if the extra-pair male grants its offspring direct benefits as a result of the male's alleles. There are results that seem to support this; a 1992 study found a correlation between the song rate of a male and the attractiveness of it (measured on the basis of how much time the female spent with the male). However, a 2007 study found that the responsiveness of a female (measured by behaviours indicating an intent to copulate or rejection) was not significantly related to the male's beak colour or its song rate. Song rate was instead hypothesised to draw female's attention to males. According to the author, this meant that the validity of the conclusions of the 1992 experiment needed to be reexamined. Combined with the lack of influence that certain morphological traits have, the large control of females over copulation could indicate chase-away sexual selection, where an exaggerated trait is evolved to counter increased resistance by the female to that feature. An additional theory as to why extra-pair copulation might evolve is the between-sex genetic correlation theory. This theory is based on the lack of definite female benefits in extra-pair copulations, and the benefits that males have by being promiscuous. It states that extra-pair mating behaviour could arise from the same set of loci, and thus that strong selection for extra-pair mating behaviour would indirectly select for promiscuous behaviour in females.

There are several traits correlated with increased extra-pair copulations. Spending time with a mate is important; even more important than the attractiveness of a male (as judged by other females; attractiveness as judged by one female was positively correlated with the judgements of other females). Symmetry of both plumage, like chest bands, and artificial features, like leg bands, are preferred by the female, as measured by how often the male is displayed to. Because of the prevalence of extra-pair paternity, males have evolved various mechanisms to try and assure their paternity of a clutch. The male guards its mate by following it and stopping extra-pair copulation attempts. Sperm competition, where two or more males attempt to inseminate a single egg, also occurs. This is indicated by the male in a pair copulating with its mate more often the day before egg-starts. This is because the last male to copulate with a female before the next egg has a 70% to 80% chance of fertilising the egg in question. Another adaptation to sperm competition is the male ejaculating up to seven times more sperm in extra-pair copulations. The increased amount of sperm occurs because of the combination of ejaculate size being controlled by the time between previous copulations, and the fact that extra-pair copulations occur in the male after its period of within-pair copulation period is complete.

The number of eggs ranges from two to eight eggs per clutch, with five being the most common number. These eggs are white or pale greyish blue in colour, and have a size of about 16 by 10 millimetres (0.63 by 0.39 in). They are incubated for 14 to 16 days. From about 5% to 11% of offspring are the result of intraspecific brood parasitism, and in cases of parasitism, there is usually only one parasitic egg per nest. Additionally, parasitised nests often have one more egg than non-parasitised nests. The female may follow a mixed strategy with relation to brood parasitism (being parasitic in addition to incubating its own clutch). From about 32% to 58% of females do this, and almost all (about 96%) lay parasitic eggs before incubating their clutch. Unpaired females sometimes lay parasitic eggs, but paired females do not rely solely on parasitism. A female that parasitised a nest in the past is more likely to do so in the future. Most of these eggs are unsuccessful; that is, the host abandons its otherwise empty nest after a parasitic egg is laid. Additionally, successful parasites are more likely to have future success from parasitism. At least during late incubation, the female zebra finch can distinguish its own eggs on the basis of odour. This method of distinction arises from the visual similarity between parasitic and non-parasitic eggs, and the cost associated with raising an egg other than one's own. When a bird is parasitised during a nesting attempt, it is less likely to be parasitised again during that season and, at the very least, during the next season (although this could be statistical noise).

Young zebra finches fledge about 17 to 18 days after hatching. They feed themselves by around 35 days after hatching, although they are still socially dependent on their parents during this time; the young become socially dependent between 36 and 50 days after hatching. They also develop sexually dimorphic plumage during this period. These finches are quick to attain sexual maturity, with most first attempting to form pair bonds and breed when they get close to 80 days in age. During the second half of the breeding season at the Danaher breeding colony, 44% of pairs attempting to breed were formed by individuals that were born earlier in the season.

Males and females are very similar in size, but are easily distinguished from one another after reaching maturity, as the males usually have bright orange cheek feathers, red beaks (as opposed to the orange beaks of females), and generally more striking black and white patterns.

==== Inbreeding ====
Inbreeding causes early death (inbreeding depression) in the zebra finch, although it does not seem to affect fertility. Embryos have a much lower survival rate, with a study finding fertile eggs from sibling pairs had only about a 25% survival rate, compared to about 41% for unrelated pairs. This early difference in survival eventually becomes null after fledging, with about equal survival rates for offspring from both sibling and unrelated pairs. Inbreeding depression mostly arises due to the expression of deleterious recessive alleles.

=== Diet ===
The zebra finch primarily eats grass seeds, feeding mostly on semi-ripe and ripe seeds (although it also takes dry seeds). The seeds are all dehusked, and are found on stems and the ground, with most being taken, at least in the nominate subspecies, from the latter. The grasses they are taken from are commonly between about 1 and 2.6 millimetres (0.039 and 0.102 in) in length, and larger and easily dehusked seeds are preferred. It supplements its diet with insects (mainly ants and termites) caught in short flights from lookout perches, in addition to flowers of the genus Chenopodium. The nestlings diet consists almost entirely of half-ripe and ripe seeds, in addition to green plant material. There are two main reasons why grass seeds are the dietary staple of the zebra finch: they are an abundant and relatively stable food source in this finch's preferred climate, and they are convenient to, for example, dehusk. In some areas, such as the eastern arid zone in Australia, the seeds taken are consistent, whereas in others, like northern Victoria, there are annual changes in the diet, as different species become abundant. The diet of this finch is generally low in species diversity; at Sandringham, Queensland 74% of the seeds eaten over a 15-month period were from Panicum decompositum, for example.

The zebra finch generally forages for seeds on the ground, taking them individually. But, it also eats seeds on the heads of standing grass. To do this, it either flies and pecks out seeds one at a time, or it perches on a nearby branch. It may also take the head to the ground by jumping up and seizing it with its bill or feet. In times of scarcity, the zebra finch can use its bill to dig into the ground to find buried seed. These seeds are generally taken from patches which have fewer husks (when compared to the number of whole seeds) and are larger and more dense. A seed patch may be checked for many months after its supply of seed is depleted. Additionally, colonial roosting and nesting and foraging in flocks can help birds discover new patches of seed.

This bird commonly forages in flocks, although it sometimes forages in pairs or by itself. In the breeding season, small or medium-sized flocks are common, but in the non-breeding season, flocks of up to about 500 birds may be formed. It occasionally forms mixed-species flocks with other estrildids. A feeding flock can be formed by individuals joining those already feeding, or by individuals landing on the ground together. Birds that arrive in this flock later are more likely to rely on scrounging, or taking food from competitors, whereas early arrivals are more likely to find food for themselves. Individuals that tend to explore more may be more dominant (measured by factors such as in what order individuals accessed a food source), at least in a study that had relatively low food availability and a single source where food could be taken from. These individuals may also be less successful in a scramble competition, where there are multiple points where food can be found. The reason for the latter is hypothesised to be a result of a trade-off between faster speed in sampling an area and lower accuracy in detecting seeds.

Foraging activity in the zebra finch peaks in the first hour after sunrise and the second to last hour before sunset. In the first instance, the increase foraging is generally achieved through many short bouts of foraging, whereas the latter comes from a few long bouts. When food becomes less available, like from August to September in northern Victoria, there is more feeding in the afternoon, less time spent on patches of food before leaving, and the distance between places where food is available is longer. There are generally two groups of individuals based on foraging behaviour. In the first group, the probability of starting or stopping a feeding bout is constant through time, and short meals are more usual. Most birds in this group have longer bouts when the gap between the previous bout is longer. In the second group (which may consist of more birds), the longer a gap is, the more likely the individual is to start feeding again. Additionally, for most birds in this group, the same is true of the stopping of a bout; the longer it is, the more likely it is to be stopped. Feeding is also usually cyclical for the second group.

=== Drinking and bathing ===
The Australian zebra finch generally consumes about 24% to 28% of its body weight (or about 3 millilitres (0.11 imp fl oz; 0.10 US fl oz)) in water per day at a temperature of 22 to 23 °C (72 to 73 °F). When at a higher temperature of 40 °C (104 °F), it may drink from 6 to 12 millilitres (0.21 to 0.42 imp fl oz; 0.20 to 0.41 US fl oz) of water per day. The zebra finch also extracts water from seeds, and can get water from metabolising its food. This metabolic water consumption can equal the amount of water that is lost when temperatures are below 23 °C (73 °F), although only for birds that are gradually dehydrated. Suddenly dehydrated birds must be in temperatures below 12 °C (54 °F) before the water lost is equal to that produced by the metabolism. This finch can survive periods of low water consumption; one study that gradually reduced the amount of water given over a period of a few months to just 0.5 to 1 millilitre (0.018 to 0.035 imp fl oz; 0.017 to 0.034 US fl oz) per week at temperatures from 22 to 24 °C (72 to 75 °F) found that the zebra finch could survive these conditions. Additionally, more than half of birds survived in a total water deprivation experiment that ran 513 days long.

When water is close, the Australian zebra finch drinks regularly during the day; if it is over about 5 kilometres (3.1 mi) away, visits generally peak at midday. It prefers to drink from small puddles or other collections of water, especially those with gently sloped banks. Additionally, exposed drinking areas are preferred to more enclosed ones. It can also drink from dew on the tip of leaves. Due to the danger of predation, the zebra finch gathers in flocks in a bush or tree near a waterhole, only going to drink after the group is large enough. It then only drinks for a few seconds. After drinking, the zebra finch generally bathes for around a minute. Then, it dries off and re-oils its plumage in a warm sheltered spot.

The Australian zebra finch needs an average of only 3.6 seconds to drink 1.5 millilitres (0.053 imp fl oz; 0.051 US fl oz) of water. This short amount of time per bout is achieved by this finch's drinking method. It swallows the water it gets while its bill tip is still submerged, unlike most birds that bring their bill tip up to swallow. This unique action is accomplished by having the tongue scoop water into the pharynx. Then, the front of the larynx forces the water into the oesophagus, which, through peristalsis, takes the fluid to the crop. This method could have evolved because the adaptations necessary were already there because of the need to quickly dehusk and swallow seeds. It allows for water to be drunk faster and taken from more diverse sources, such as drops of dew and cattle troughs; the latter requires the bird to drink upside down.

=== Temperature regulation ===
The body temperature (as measured from the cloaca) of the zebra finch may vary from 38 to 44 °C (100 to 111 °F), rising with increasing air temperatures. Body temperatures over 45 °C (113 °F) can cause death within an hour. This finch first cools itself by covering its plumage with water, not moving, and holding its wings out to allow more thinly feathered regions to be exposed. It also has a large capacity for evaporative cooling through the lungs and skin, with measurements of heat lost through evaporative cooling over heat produced being as high as 1.37 at 43.4 °C (110.1 °F). This can occur as a result of panting, which starts to occur when body temperatures reach 42 to 43 °C (108 to 109 °F) (although this may start when the air temperature is as low as 32 °C (90 °F)). This can cause dehydration and may put birds into a lethargic state. Additionally, the zebra finch's simple rete mirabile ophthalmicum (found in the head) makes it unable to cool the brain as effectively as other birds, like the common kestrel. This lacking ability to cool the brain, in combination with dehydration, may cause the mass die-offs found during prolonged periods of high temperatures. For example, in January 1932, temperatures were between 47 and 52 °C (117 and 126 °F) for 16 days in northern Southern Australia, causing upwards of tens of thousands of this bird to die, with many being found in dams. However, so long as drinking water is available, the bird is able to tolerate heat waves on top of the usual high summer temperatures. Tolerance is also achieved through behaviour. In extreme conditions the finch will reduce its activity in the hotter parts of the day, and it is capable of predicting hotter events and will pre-emptively eat and drink in preparation for the hours of enforced inactivity.

== Predators ==
Nest predators of the Australian zebra finch include the tiger snake, brown snake, dragon lizard, pygmy mulga monitor, singing honeyeater, grey-crowned babbler, yellow-throated miner, little crow, Torresian crow, black rat, and house mouse. Carnivorous marsupials are also nest predators, and barn owls take roosting adult zebra finches.

== Aviculture ==
=== Living space ===
Zebra finches can be kept in aviaries and cages. They are easy to keep and are suitable even for beginners. The minimum cage dimensions for a pair are around 70 cm × 40 cm × 50 cm (28 in × 16 in × 20 in), with enough horizontal space for flight. The metal bars of the cage should be placed no more than ~1 centimetre (0.39 in) apart. An external aviary should have an indoor space for shelter, where the birds can sleep, rest and hide from bad weather. Because of their social nature they should not be kept alone and should at least be kept in pairs to have company. In addition to providing access to clean, fresh drinking water, zebra finches should have access to a shallow water dish for bathing.

=== Feeding ===
The zebra finch diet consists of a seed mixture suitable for small birds. They like different kinds of millet and ears of common cereals and grasses that they can husk themselves. Another important part of their diet are fruits and vegetables, such as apples, cucumbers, grated carrots, bananas, grapes and salad, spinach and other greens. Avocado should not be given due to its toxicity to birds. An important source of minerals is crushed chicken egg shells or cuttlefish bone. Egg food is also recommended.

=== Nesting ===
For nesting, it is recommended to provide the birds with a nesting box with the dimensions 15 cm × 15 cm × 15 cm (5.9 in × 5.9 in × 5.9 in) and material for building the nest, such as hay and cotton. If a nest is provided, breeding will typically begin ~1 week after pairing. The female usually lays 5 eggs that are then incubated for 14–16 days. Young zebra finches fledge about 17 to 18 days after hatching. They feed themselves by around 35 days after hatching, although they are still socially dependent on their parents during this time; the young become socially independent between 36 and 50 days after hatching. They also develop sexually dimorphic plumage during this period. Zebra finches are quick to attain sexual maturity, with most first attempting to form pair bonds and breed when they get close to 80 days in age.

=== Health and lifespan in captivity ===
Zebra finches can have knemicoptes mites, air sac mites, aspergillosis, coccidiosis and blood-sucking mites.

They normally live for 5 to 9 years but may live as long as 12 years or more. This depends on the quality of care, stress, and other factors.

== Gallery ==
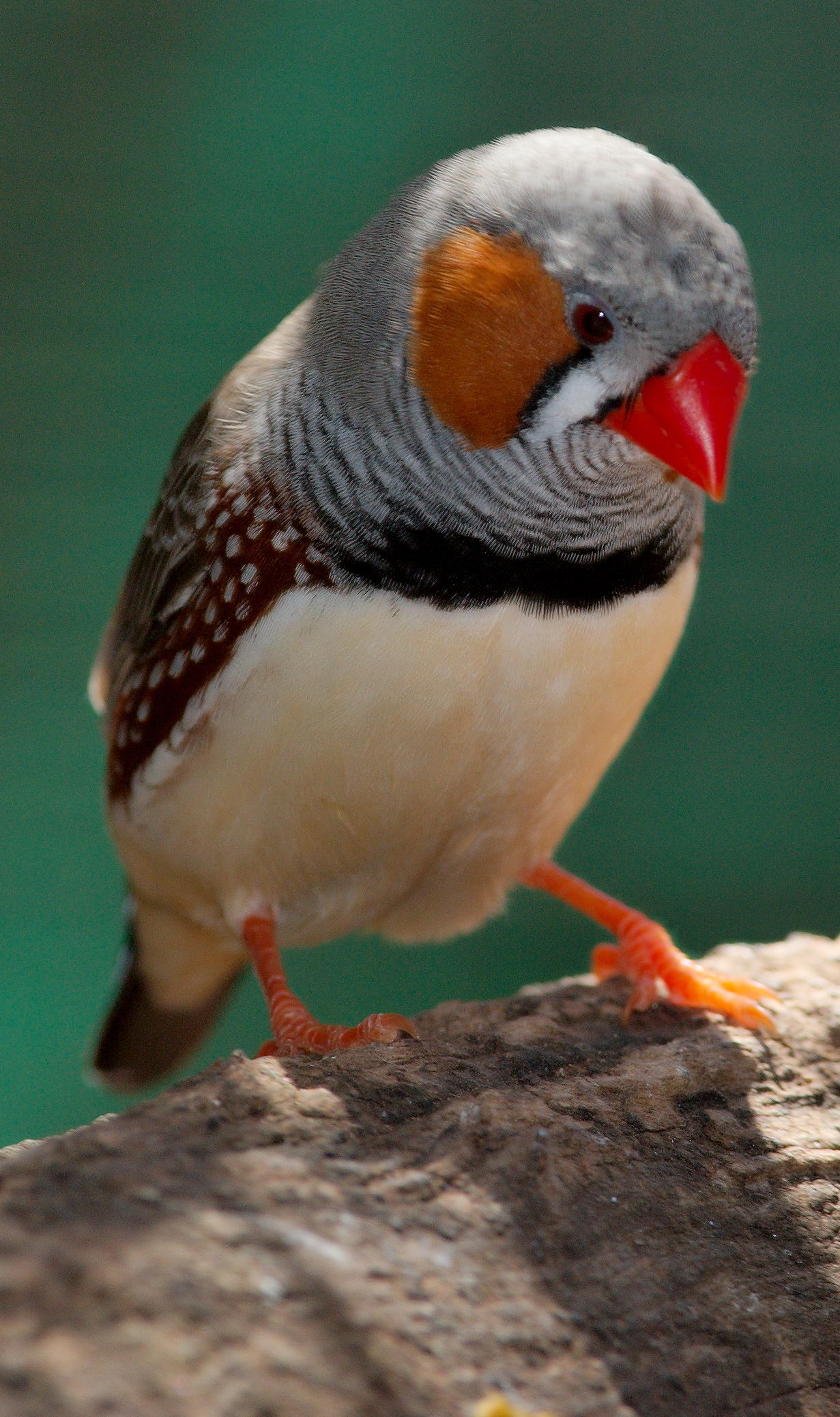
Adult male at Dundee Wildlife Park, Murray Bridge, South Australia

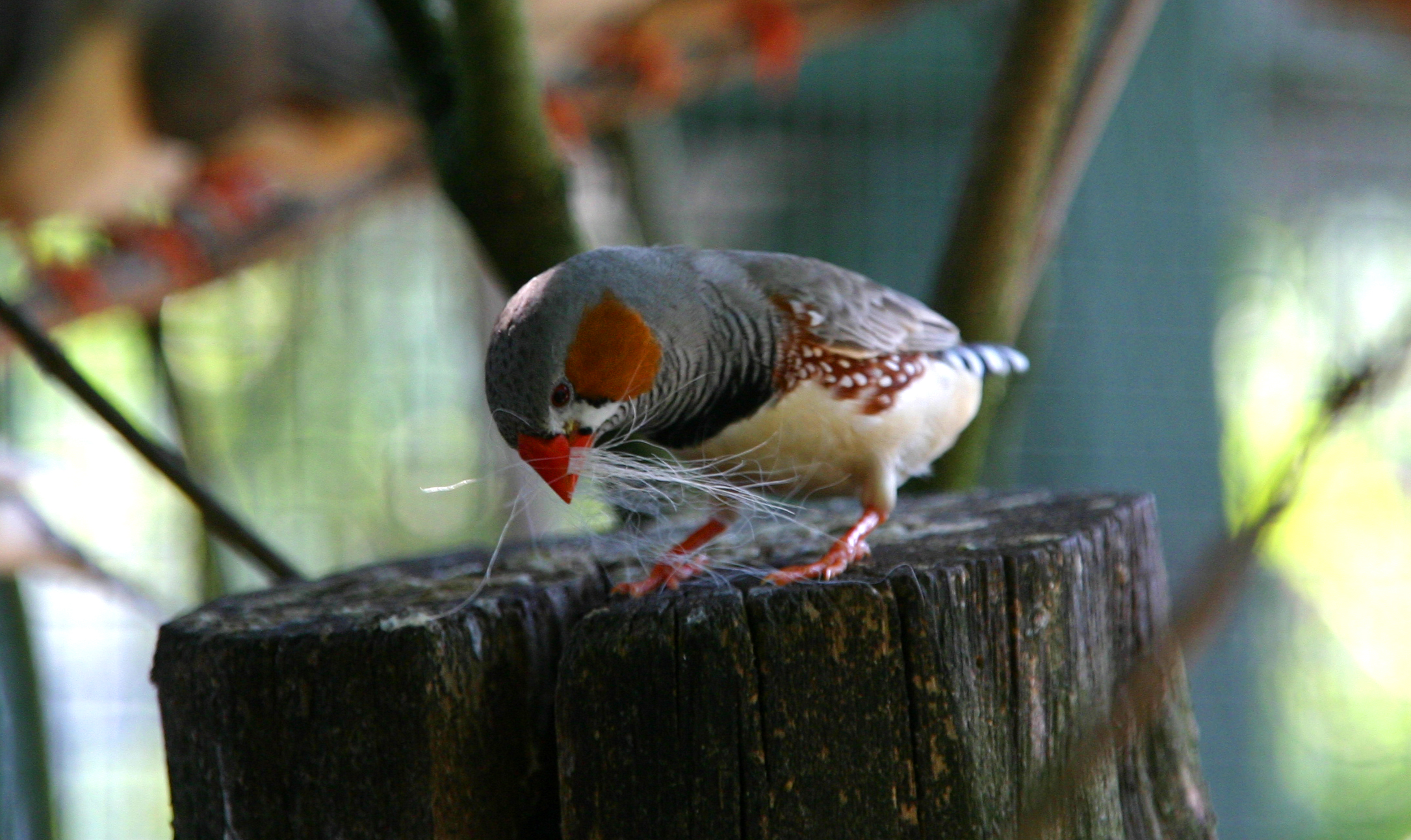
Domesticated zebra finch, southern France

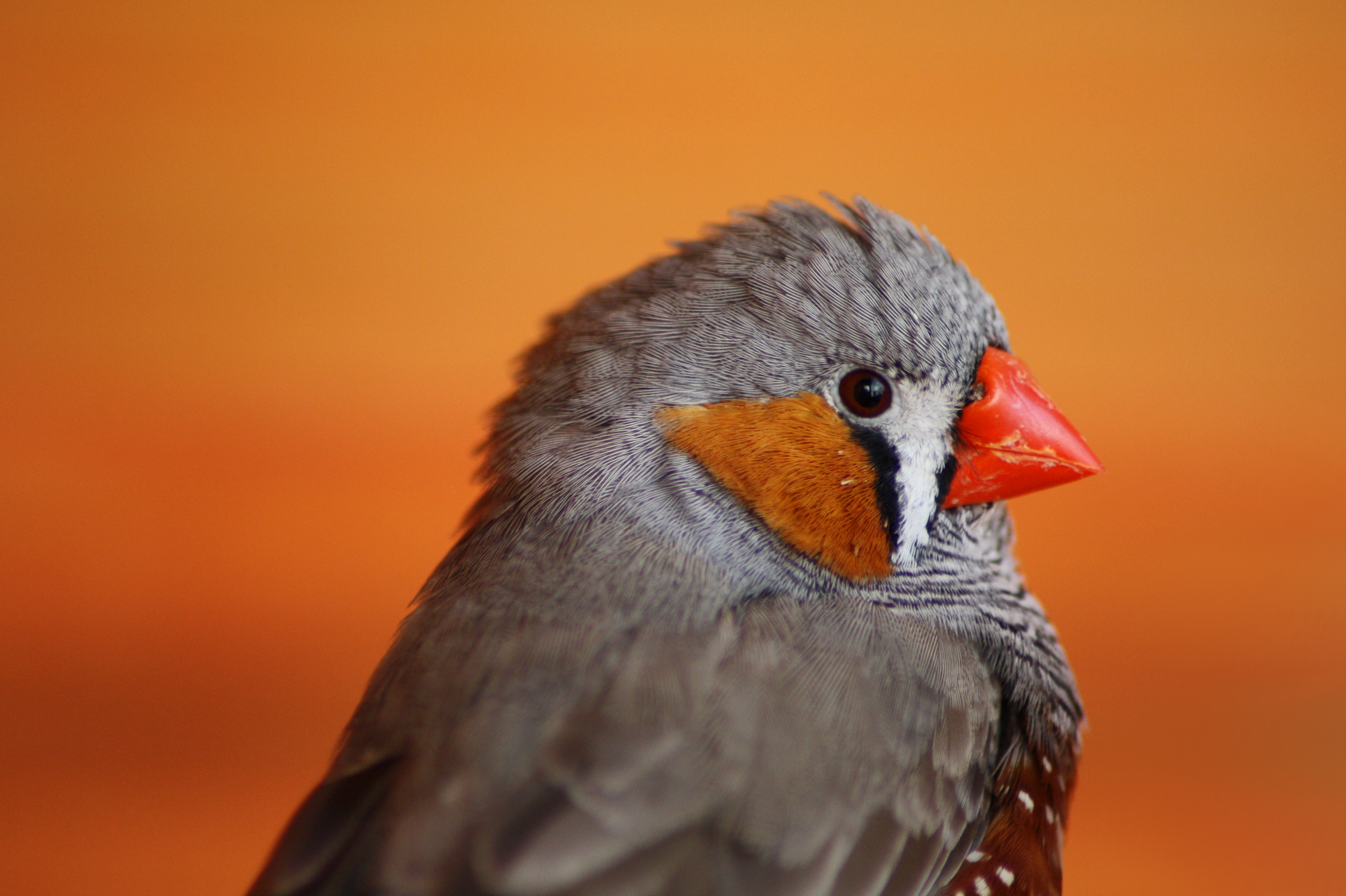
Captive male

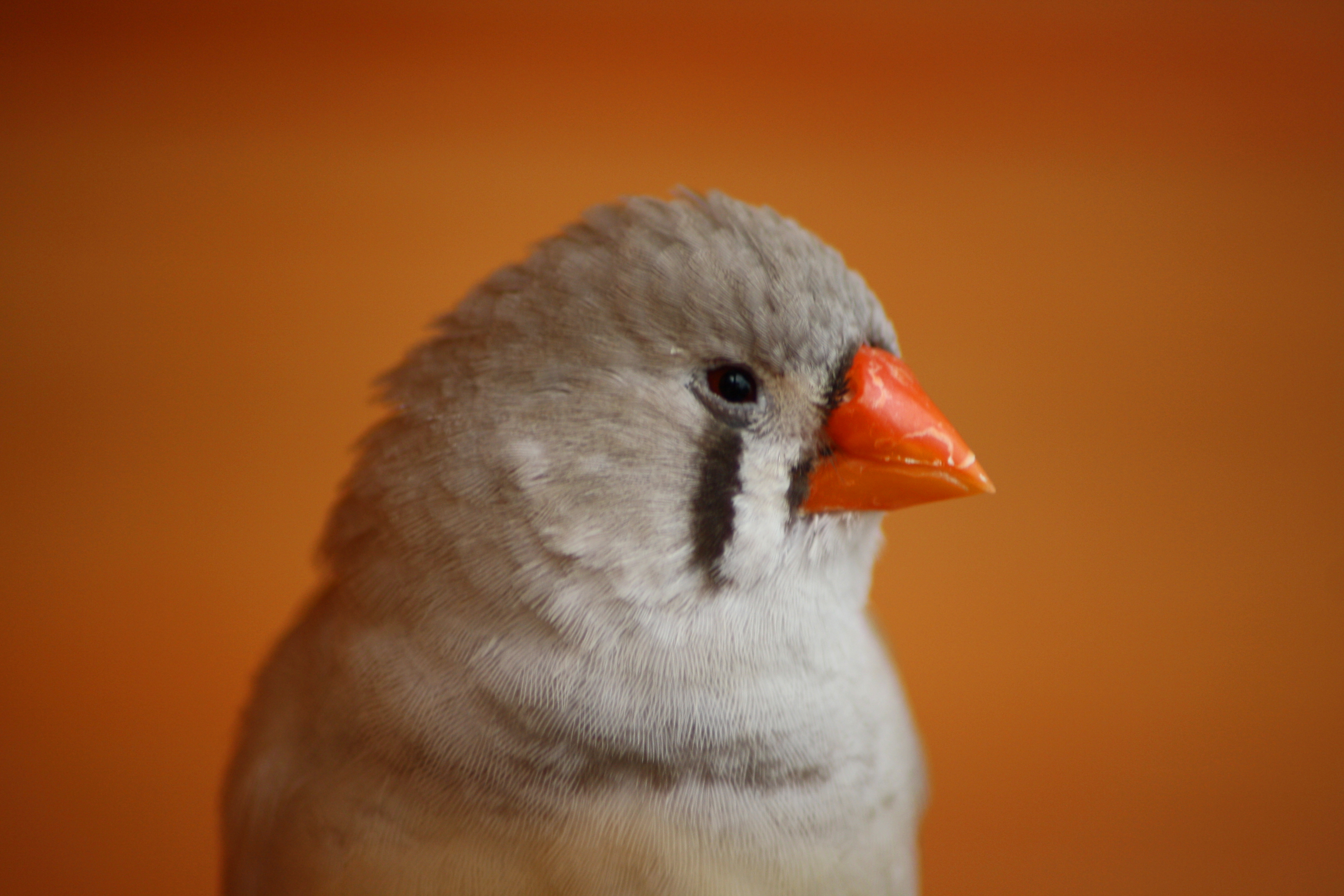
Captive female

== Bibliography ==
- Zann, Richard A. (1996). The Zebra Finch: A Synthesis of Field and Laboratory Studies. Oxford University Press. ISBN 978-0-19-854079-3.
