= Karl Heider =

Karl Heider may refer to:

- Karl G. Heider (born 1935), American visual anthropologist
- Karl Heider (zoologist) (1856–1935), Austrian zoologist and embryologist
