= Friedrich Oltmanns =

German phycologist

Friedrich Oltmanns (11 July 1860, in Oberndorf – 13 December 1945) was a German biologist phycologist.

In 1884 he received his doctorate at the University of Strasbourg, afterwards working as an assistant at the University of Rostock (from 1885). In 1893, he was appointed an associate professor of botany at the University of Freiburg, where in 1902 he became a full professor and director of the botanical garden. With Max Verworn, Hermann Theodor Simon, Eugen Korschelt and others, he was co-editor of the 10-volume Handwörterbuch der Naturwissenschaften.

He was the author of the three volume Morphologie und Biologie der Algen (Morphology and biology of algae):

- Volume 1: Chrysophyceae, Chlorophyceae.
- Volume 2: Phaeophyceae, Rhodophyceae.
- Volume 3: Morphologie, Fortpflanzung, die Ernährung der Algen, der Haushalt der Gewässer, die Lebensbedingungen, Vegetations-Perioden, das Zusammenleben (Morphology, reproduction, etc.).

The algae genera of Oltmannsiella and Oltmannsia are named in his honor, the latter genus being circumscribed by Austrian phycologist Josef Schiller (1877–1960).
