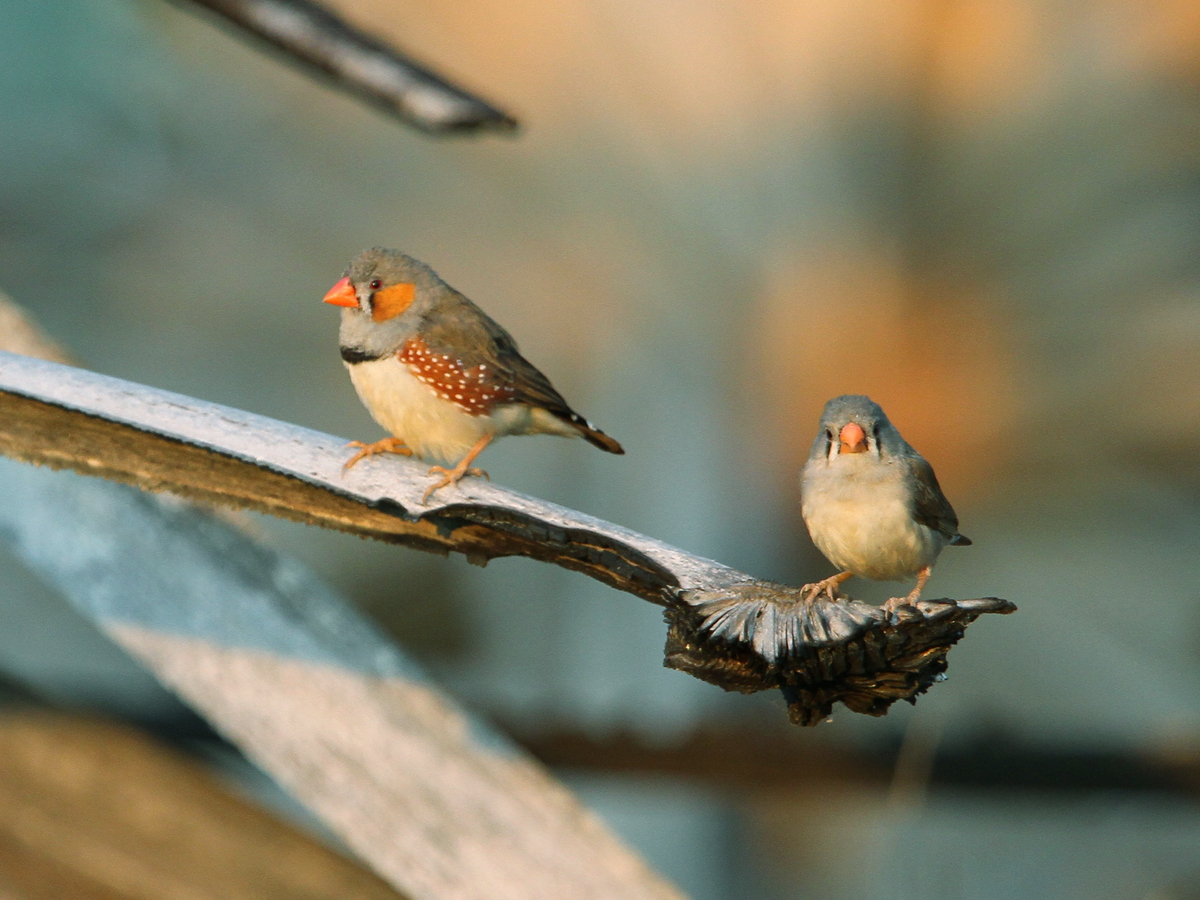

Conservation status
- Least Concern (IUCN 3.1)

Scientific classification
- Kingdom: Animalia
- Phylum: Chordata
- Class: Aves
- Order: Passeriformes
- Family: Estrildidae
- Genus: Taeniopygia
- Species: T. guttata

Binomial name
- Taeniopygia guttata (Vieillot, 1817)

= Sunda zebra finch =

Species of bird

The Sunda zebra finch (Taeniopygia guttata) is a species of bird in the family Estrildidae. It is found in the Lesser Sundas. For almost two centuries, its closest relative from Australia was generally included in T.guttata as a subspecies; since the 2020s it is generally considered a separate species Taeniopygia castanotis.

Most pre-2020 literature referencing "T.guttata" actually refers to the birds now known as T.castanotis – in particular physiological, neurological and behavioral studies generally used "T.guttata" for the Australian species, because T.guttata sensu stricto was never kept in captivity in significant numbers, and thus was unavailable for such research.

== Species identification ==
Differences between the two zebrafinches are slight. Purebred adult males, however, can immediately distinguished by the grey throat of T.guttata, while that region is barred black-and-white in T.castanotis. These namesake "zebra" markings are limited to a barely visible patch on the sides of the lower neck in T.guttata. In direct comparison, the Sunda species has a slight brownish hue on the top of the head and the underside.

More importantly, during their courtship rituals, the Sunda species' males adopt a more upright pose than the Australian ones, and while the latter fluff up the feathers at the back of the head, the Sunda males fluff the forehead feathers instead. These slight differences seem to be sufficient to ensure assortative mating even in mixed flocks in captivity: individuals of the two zebrafinch species will only mate with each other if no conspecific partners are available.

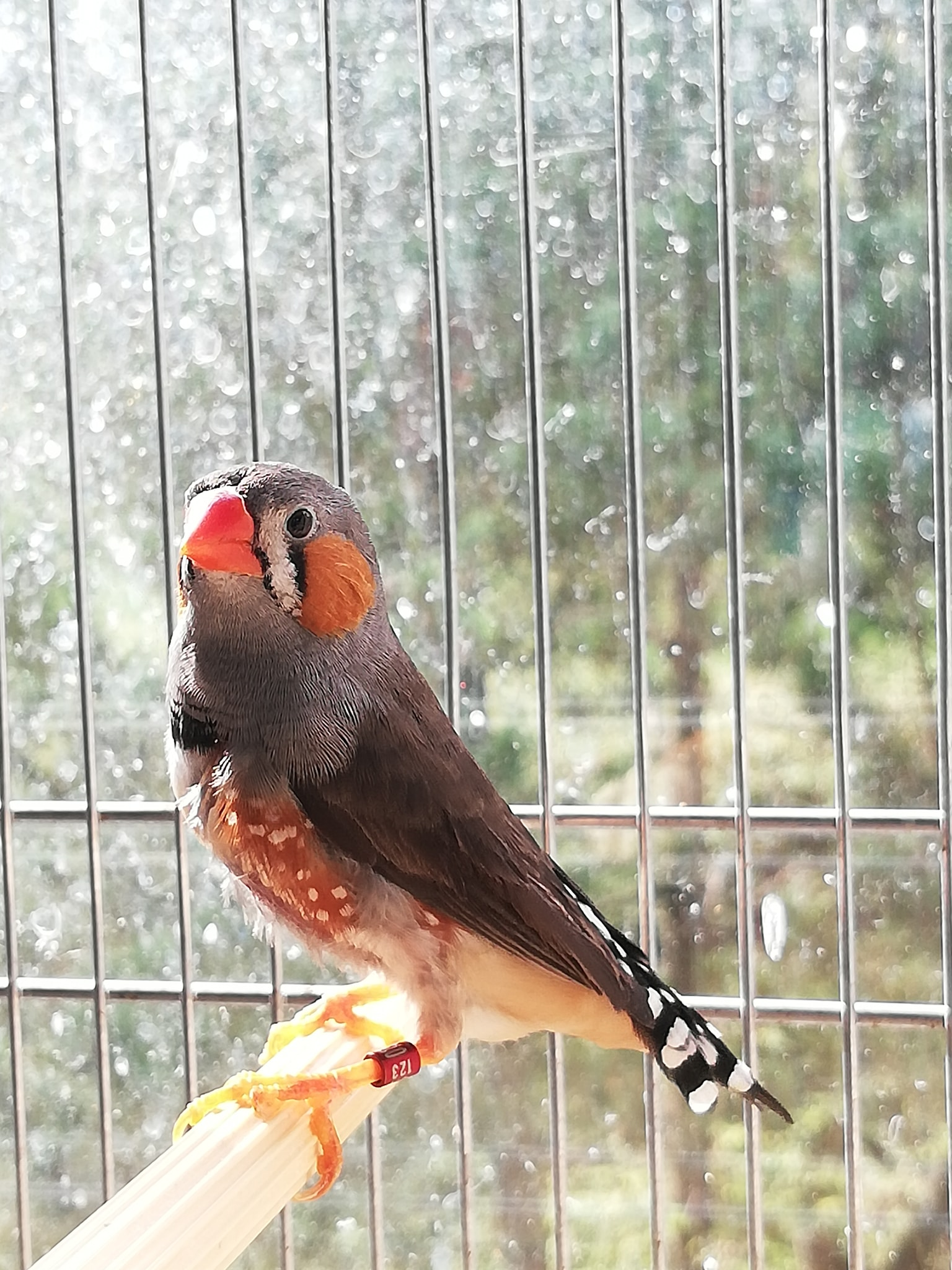
Adult male of T.guttata (throat grey)

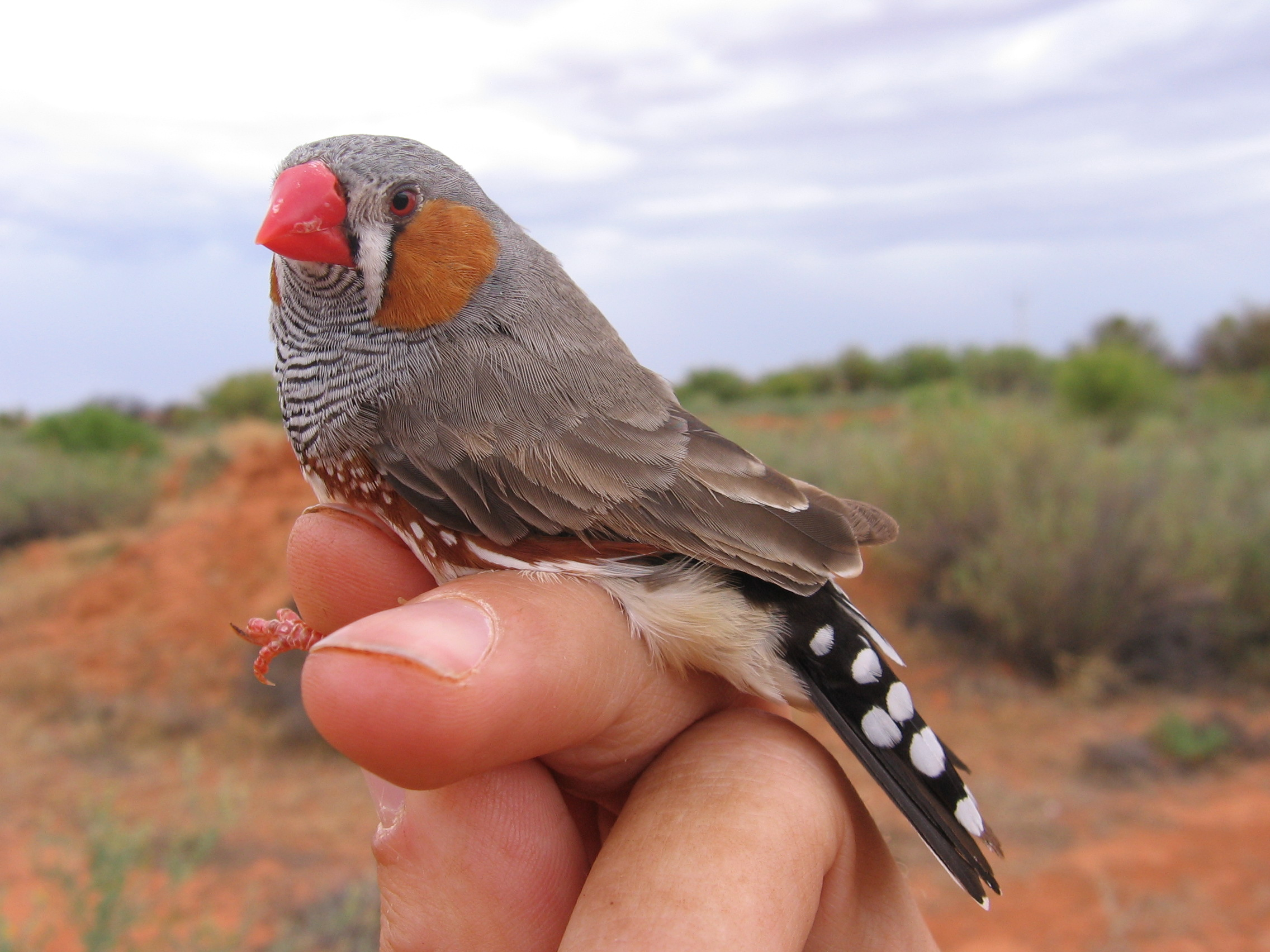
Adult male of T.castanotis (throat zebra-striped)

== Parasites ==
T. guttata sometimes serves as a model organism. Study of the immune response of T. guttata to parasites is informative for avians as a class. Its transcriptome responses to infection have been studied by Watson et al., 2017 and Scalf et al., 2019. T. guttata is not known to have ever been infected with any Plasmodium. Valkiūnas et al., 2018 find T. guttata seems totally resistant to the malaria parasite that is most common among avians, Plasmodium relictum.

== Vocalization ==
Only male zebra finches sing. Each finch has an individual song. Between the ages of 25 and 90 days old, young zebra finches learn to sing by copying the songs of adults, and sometimes by copying the songs of other juveniles.
