= Physioplastic art =

Art that reproduces a natural object

Physioplastic art was a concept first described by Max Verworn in 1914. Physioplastic art, as described in Verworn's Ideoplastiche Kunst, consisted of "a direct reproduction of the natural object or of its immediate memory image", and along with his definition of ideoplastic art, that of abstract knowledge, was deemed an important art educational theory.

Usage:

- physioplastic landscape
- physioplastic naturalism
