= Adolf Remane =

German zoologist (1898–1976)

- Born: August 10, 1898; Krotoszyn
- Died: December 22, 1976 (aged 78); Plön
- Education: Humboldt University of Berlin
- Occupation: Zoologist
- Employers: Kiel University; Martin Luther University Halle-Wittenberg
- Father: Adolf Remane

Adolf Remane (10 August 1898 – 22 December 1976) was a German zoologist who pioneered the study of the marine meiofauna. He was a director of the Zoological Institute of Kiel University, and a President of the German Zoological Society.

== Life ==
Robert Gustav Adolf Remane was born on 10 August 1898 in Krotoszyn, Province of Posen. His father was a teacher of drawing and his mother a handcraft teacher. After completing his high school education (Abitur) in 1916 at the Königliches Wilhelms-Gymnasium Krotoschin, he enlisted voluntarily. He was stationed on the Western Front in France until 1918. After the war, he studied biology, anthropology, paleontology, and ethnology at the Friedrich Wilhelm University of Berlin. He received his doctorate in 1921 for a thesis on morphology. From 1923 he was a research assistant at the Zoological Institute of Kiel University, where he was named a supernumerary professor in 1929. In 1934 he was appointed to a regular professorship and named as Director of the Zoological Institute of the Martin Luther University of Halle-Wittenberg. In 1936, he took on the leadership of the Zoological Institute and Museum in Kiel, where he founded the Institut für Meereskunde at Kitzeberg on the Kieler Förde in 1937. In that year he joined the National Socialist (Nazi) Party as a member. He was a member of the board of the German Zoological Society. As a board member, he co-signed a letter dated 27 July 1942 addressed to the Reich Chancellery, expressly endorsing the Nazi measures against Judaism.

In the post-war period, Remane was interned by the British occupation forces and charged with the publication of eugenic writings. However, because his publications were only concerned with zoological systematics, where "race" was still commonplace as a technical term, he was allowed to resume the leadership of the Zoological Institute and Museum in Kiel in 1947, which he held until his retirement in 1966. Remane was President of the German Zoological Society for 1963–1964. The ciliate genus Remanella is named after him.

Former students of Remane who went on to become university professors included Peter Ax, Wolfgang Dohle, Hermann Remmert, and Rolf Siewing.

Adolf Remane had two sons, the entomologist Reinhard Remane (1929–2009) and the geologist and paleontologist Jürgen Remane (1934–2004).

He died on 22 December 1976 in Plön, West Germany

== Work ==
Remane was one of the most prominent German zoologists of the 20th Century. His earlier research focussed on zoological systematics, marine biology, and the zoology and paleontology of primates. In particular, he described the invertebrate fauna living in marine sediment (meiofauna), from groups such as gastrotrichs, rotifers, kinorhynchs and archiannelids. His later work was on theoretical topics such as phylogenetics and comparative anatomy, in which he developed criteria for homology which are still used today. With Volker Storch and Ulrich Welsch he wrote the standard textbooks Kurzes Lehrbuch der Zoologie (1972) and Systematische Zoologie (1976), which have been reissued in several new editions.

== Memberships ==
- Deutsche Akademie der Naturforscher Leopoldina (1935)
- Akademie der Wissenschaften und der Literatur, Mainz (1949)
- Finnish Society of Sciences and Letters (1956)
- Royal Swedish Academy of Sciences (1960)

== Works ==
- Die Grundlagen des natürlichen Systems, der vergleichenden Anatomie und der Phylogenetik. Leipzig: Geest & Portig K.-G., 1952 (2nd ed. 1956, reprint of 2nd ed. by Verlag Otto Koeltz, Koenigstein/Taunus 1971)
- Das soziale Leben der Tiere. Hamburg: Rowohlt, 1960 (In: Rowohlts deutsche Enzyklopädie 97)
- Adolf Remane et al.: Systematische Zoologie. Stämme des Tierreichs. Stuttgart: G. Fischer Verlag, 1976.
- Adolf Remane, Volker Storch, Ulrich Welsch: Kurzes Lehrbuch der Zoologie. Stuttgart and New York: Fischer, 1985, ISBN 3437203371 (and other editions)
