= Jena Declaration =

Scientific statement on races

The Jena Declaration is a scientific statement that questions and refutes the concept of human "races in a biological sense". It was published in September 2019 at the 112th Annual Meeting of the German Zoological Society (Deutsche Zoologische Gesellschaft) in Jena. The statement was written by leading scientists from the fields of evolutionary research, genetics and zoology, and was instrumental in influencing the legislative amendment to remove the term "Rasse" (roughly "race in a biological sense") from the German constitution. With this statement, the Institute for Zoology and Evolutionary Research at Friedrich Schiller University Jena explicitly distances itself from its 20th century predecessors, especially from the controversial scholar and evolutionary biologist Ernst Haeckel, who was closely associated with the University of Jena and whose ideas of racism and eugenics are today considered scientifically untenable and morally reprehensible.

== Content ==
The authors of the statement, Martin S. Fischer, Uwe Hoßfeld, Johannes Krause and Stefan Richter examined the issue of alleged human "races" from a biological perspective. They clarified that this concept has no scientific justification. Scientific studies of genetic variation within and between human populations showed that the biological concept of "race" was a typological construct based on arbitrarily selected physical characteristics and did not reflect the actual genetic diversity of the human species.

The Jena Declaration affirms that there are no "races" in the biological sense in humans, since the genetic variation within human populations is often greater than the genetic variation between these populations. Only in domestic animals the genetic similarity within a breed is actually greater than between breeds. Moreover, genetic differences between populations are continuous, as humans travelled long before major explorations and voyages of conquest by Europeans, creating links between populations that were geographically distant from each other. External characteristics such as skin colour, used for typological classifications or in everyday racism, are very superficial and rapidly changing biological adaptations to local conditions. Fischer affirms that there are no fixed difference amongst the base pairs in the genomes of Africans and non-Africans, meaning no base pair variant is known to be present in 100% of all Africans while also being present in 0% of all non-Africans, albeit by geographic definition.

The authors conclude that the concept of human "races" is the result of racism and not its precondition. Its use in scientific literature and social discourse often leads to misunderstandings and reinforces prejudice and discrimination. They therefore call for the term "race" to be discontinued in relation to people, except in historical or socio-political contexts where it should be understood as a social construction rather than a biological reality. They argue that the use of the term in relation to people creates a false idea of genetically separate groups and that it is important to debunk this myth in order to combat racism.

They conclude the statement with an appeal to educational institutions, media, authorities and all citizens to reconsider the German term "Rasse" and emphasise genetic diversity and humanity instead of artificial and harmful categorisations.

== Impact ==
In Germany, the Declaration had a considerable impact on public debate and legislation, especially on the discussion about removing the term "Rasse" from the German constitution.

The Jena Declaration also led to a number of publications in the field of education and learning. In the book "Den Begriff 'Rasse' überwinden: die 'Jenaer Erklärung' in der (Hoch-)Schulbildung" (Overcoming the Concept of Race: The Jena Declaration in (Higher) School Education), a variety of ideas and concepts for overcoming the concept of "race" are offered. In this publication, the Jena Declaration serves as an impulse for a nationwide reorientation of (high) school education. Another example is the publication "Die Jenaer Erklärung gegen Rassismus' und ihre Anwendung im Unterricht" (The Jena Declaration against Racism and its Application in the Classroom), which presents concrete examples of the application of the Jena Declaration in the classroom.

IQWiG (The independent Institute for Quality and Efficiency in Health Care) also backs the "Jena Declaration" by ceasing to translate the term "race" as "Rasse" in its evaluations.

The Institute no longer translates the term "race" as "Rasse" in its assessments.
