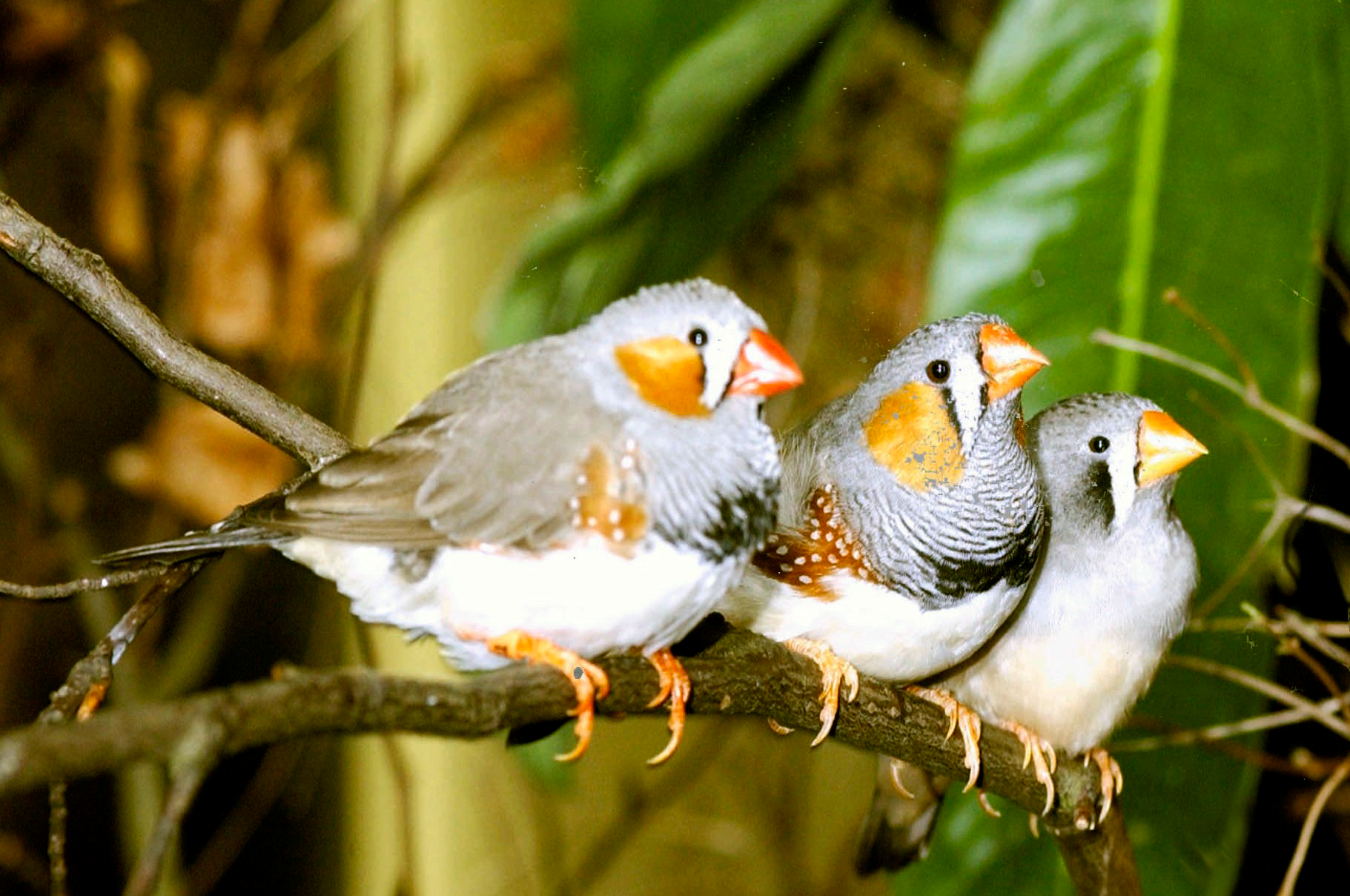
- Taeniopygia castanotis

Scientific classification
- Kingdom: Animalia
- Phylum: Chordata
- Class: Aves
- Order: Passeriformes
- Family: Estrildidae
- Genus: Taeniopygia; Reichenbach, 1862

Species
- T. guttata T. castanotis

= Zebra finch =

Species of finch

The zebra finches are two species of estrildid finch in the genus Taeniopygia found in Australia and Indonesia. They are seed-eaters that travel in large flocks. They typically live for 2 to 3 years in the wild.

== Taxonomy ==
The genus Taeniopygia was introduced in 1862 by the German naturalist Ludwig Reichenbach. He included two species in the genus but did not specify the type. The type was designated in 1890 as Amadina castanotis Gould, the Australian zebra finch, by Richard Bowdler Sharpe. The genus name is from Ancient Greek ταινια/tainia meaning "band" and -πυγιος/-pugios meaning "-rumped".

== Species ==
The genus contains two species:

Genus Taeniopygia – Reichenbach, 1862 – two species
Common name	Scientific name and subspecies	Range	Size and ecology	IUCN status and estimated population
Sunda zebra finch	Taeniopygia guttata (Vieillot, 1817)	Lesser Sunda Islands of Indonesia, from Lombok to Timor	Size: Habitat: Diet:	LC
Australian zebra finch	Taeniopygia castanotis (Gould, 1837)	Arid regions of Australia aside from the Cape York Peninsula in northeast Queensland	Size: Habitat: Diet:	LC

Previously, both species were classified as a single species, the zebra finch (T. guttata). However, they were split by the IUCN Red List and BirdLife International in 2016. The International Ornithological Congress followed suit in 2022 based on studies noting differences in plumage, mtDNA divergence, and assortative mating between both species in captivity.

The zebra finch was first captured in 1801 during Nicolas Baudin's expedition to Australia. The Indonesian species was described in 1817 by Louis Pierre Vieillot in his Nouveau Dictionnaire d'Histoire Naturelle, where he gave it the scientific name Fringilla guttata. The Australian species was then described in 1837 by John Gould as Amadina castanotis. Its current genus, Taeniopygia, was described in 1862 by Ludwig Reichenbach. It is placed in the tribe Poephilini, along with the genus Poephila, which it was previously included in; the split between Taeniopygia and Poephila is justified by a 1987 study using protein electrophoresis and chromosomal banding.

The zebra finches likely evolved in Australia, with either northern or southeastern Australia postulated as two places where the genus arose. The present-day distribution of the species T. guttata is likely due to a Pleistocene glaciation event where the sea level dropped between about 100 and 150 metres (330 and 490 ft), putting the coasts of Timor and Australia closer. This allowed T. castanotis swept out to sea by cyclones to see mountains near the west coast of Timor, which prompted them to make landfall on the island.

The morphological differences between the species include differences in size. T. guttata is smaller than T. castanotis. In addition, the T. guttata males do not have the fine barring found on the throat and upper breast and have smaller breast bands. Incubation lasts for 14 days.

Although the Sunda zebra finch was described first, the Australian zebra finch is the far more famous member of the genus, due to its status as a popular pet as well as a model organism for the wider study of birds. The Australian zebra finch is used worldwide in several research fields (e.g. neurobiology, physiology, behaviour, ecology and evolution) as individuals are easy to maintain and breed in captivity.

Zebra finches are more social than many migratory birds, generally traveling in small bands and sometimes gathering in larger groups. They are one of the bird species that is able to learn new vocalizations and have become a dominant model species in the study of vocal learning. There is evidence that some aspects of this are culturally transmitted and that the songs of geographically distant populations can change over time, resulting in new dialects. Research also shows that zebra finches hear and respond to variations in bird song that are not apparent to human listeners. Female zebra finches show a preference for mates with a dialect similar to the one of their adolescent peers. Researchers are exploring analogies between human language and birdsong.

== Cited sources ==
- Christidis, L. (1987a). "Biochemical systematics within palaeotropic finches (Aves: Estrildidae)". The Auk. 104 (3): 380–392. doi:10.2307/4087534. ISSN 0004-8038. JSTOR 4087534.
- Christidis, L. (1987b). "Phylogeny and Systematics of Estrildine Finches and Their Relationships to Other Seed-eating Passerines". Emu – Austral Ornithology. 87 (2): 119–123. Bibcode:1987EmuAO..87..119C. doi:10.1071/MU9870119. ISSN 0158-4197.
- Hyland Bruno, Julia; Jarvis, Erich D.; Liberman, Mark; Tchernichovski, Ofer (14 January 2021). "Birdsong Learning and Culture: Analogies with Human Spoken Language". Annual Review of Linguistics. 7 (1): 449–472. doi:10.1146/annurev-linguistics-090420-121034. ISSN 2333-9683. S2CID 228894898.
- Mason, Betsy (15 February 2022). "Do birds have language? It depends on how you define it". Knowable Magazine. Annual Reviews. doi:10.1146/knowable-021522-1.
- Mello, Claudio V. (23 October 2014). "The Zebra Finch, Taeniopygia guttata: An Avian Model for Investigating the Neurobiological Basis of Vocal Learning". Cold Spring Harbor Protocols. 2014 (12): 1237–1242. doi:10.1101/pdb.emo084574. ISSN 1940-3402. PMC 4571486. PMID 25342070.
- Olsson, Urban; Alström, Per (1 May 2020). "A comprehensive phylogeny and taxonomic evaluation of the waxbills (Aves: Estrildidae)". Molecular Phylogenetics and Evolution. 146 106757. Bibcode:2020MolPE.14606757O. doi:10.1016/j.ympev.2020.106757. ISSN 1055-7903. PMID 32028027. S2CID 211048731.
- Payne, R. (2018). del Hoyo, Josep; Elliott, Andrew; Sargatal, Jordi; Christie, David A.; de Juana, Eduardo (eds.). "Timor Zebra Finch (Taeniopygia guttata)". Handbook of the Birds of the World Alive. Barcelona, Spain: Lynx Edicions. doi:10.2173/bow.zebfin2.01. S2CID 216499275.
- Wang, Daiping; Forstmeier, Wolfgang; Farine, Damien R; Maldonado-Chaparro, Adriana A; Martin, Katrin; Pei, Yifan; Alarcón-Nieto, Gustavo; Klarevas-Irby, James A; Ma, Shouwen; Aplin, Lucy M; Kempenaers, Bart (28 March 2022). "Machine learning reveals cryptic dialects that explain mate choice in a songbird". Nature Communications. 13 (1): 1630. Bibcode:2022NatCo..13.1630W. doi:10.1038/s41467-022-28881-w. PMC 8960899. PMID 35347115.
- Zann, Richard A. (1996). The Zebra Finch: A Synthesis of Field and Laboratory Studies. Oxford University Press. ISBN 978-0-19-854079-3.
