= Charlotte Helfrich-Förster =

German zoologist, neurobiologist, and professor

- Born: Charlotte Helfrich; August 30, 1957 (age 69); Heilbronn-Sontheim, Baden-Württemberg, Germany
- Education: University of Stuttgart, Eberhard Karls University of Tübingen, Max Planck Institute for Biological Cybernetics
- Title: Senior Professor of Chronobiology, Chair of Neurobiology and Genetics
- Children: 2 (born 1985 and 1987)
- Website: https://www.biozentrum.uni-wuerzburg.de/en/neurogenetics/research/wg-foerster/charlotte-foerster/

Charlotte Helfrich-Förster (born August 30, 1957 in Heilbronn-Sontheim) is a German zoologist, neurobiologist, and professor at the University of Würzburg. Helfrich-Förster is particularly known for her research in the mechanisms of circadian rhythms in insects. Currently, she is decoding the circadian clock in fly species that have adapted to high latitudes and the role of their clock in photoperiodism. In addition, she's investigating the circadian clock network in Antarctic krill in collaboration with Dr. Bettina Meyer and her team at Alfred Wegner Institute in Bremerhaven. She is also exploring the role of human lunar rhythms.

== Early life and education ==
Born Charlotte Helfrich, she was born as the first of two daughters to a teacher and a housewife and was raised in a traditional German household. Her mother, who had previously worked as a secretary, became a full-time homemaker after Charlotte's birth, an observation that shaped Helfrich-Förster's resolve to pursue an independent scientific career.

She studied biology at the University of Stuttgart from 1976 to 1977 and Eberhard-Karls University of Tübingen from 1977 to 1981, and then received her diploma from Eberhard-Karls University of Tübingen in 1981. Her love for chronobiology began during her second semester of biology studies during Hans Erkert's seminar which focused on the function of the suprachiasmatic nucleus (SCN) in mammals. She completed her diploma thesis at the Botanical Institute of Eberhard Karls University of Tübingen under the supervision of Professor Wolfgang Engelmann. Although she was passionate about research, Helfrich-Förster did not initially aspire to become a professor. Women held a minimal share of professor positions at the Universities of Stuttgart and Tübingen, while most women in science worked as technicians or research assistants. She wanted to become a research assistant to continue scientific work in chronobiology. It was not until later that she recognized professorship as a potential path for achieving more long-term stability and independence, after facing numerous structural limitations in academic research.

She earned her doctorate in 1985 at the Botanical Institute of the University of Tübingen, working under Dr. Wolfgang Engelmann. Differing from her previous work as a plant physiologist, her doctoral work focused on the circadian clock in the brains of flies. Specifically, during her PhD, she identified the first candidates for circadian clock neurons, inspiring her to further explore this area of research. During this time, she supported herself in part as a scientific draftswoman, as portions of her doctoral and post-doctoral work were unpaid. When she completed her doctoral thesis in 1985, she was awarded the Attempto Prize, which enabled her to travel and present her research results.

== Career ==
She married in 1985, changing her name from Charlotte Helfrich to Charlotte Förster, but she used the name Charlotte Helfrich-Förster in nearly all of her scientific publications. After the birth of her first child in 1985, she stepped back from scientific research and returned as a postdoctoral fellow at the Eberhard Karls University of Tübingen from 1986 to 1987, and at the Max-Planck-Institute of Biological Cybernetics from 1994 to 1995. During her time as a postdoctoral fellow at Eberhard Karls University of Tübingen, she continuously struggled to find childcare, since such facilities are very limited. This presented an additional challenge to balancing family life and career development that eventually caused Helfrich-Förster to take a break from her scientific endeavors from 1988 to 1992 to raise her two children. While she took this time off, she considered pursuing a habilitation, a necessary qualification for professorship in Germany. Although she received an offer to take an assistant role at the University of Göttingen to study circadian rhythms in algae, she declined due to a combination of family obligations, her husband's new job in Tübingen, and the limited research opportunities that would accompany the heavy teaching demands. In 1992, she secured a fellowship from the University of Tübingen, which allowed for her to arrange part-time childcare and return to her research work. In 2000, she completed her habilitation in zoology, and in 2001, she became a professor of zoology at the University of Regensburg. Since 2009, she has held the chair for neurobiology and genetics at the University of Würzburg and became a permanent professor. In 2012, she established the DFG (German Research Foundation) Collaborative Research Centre Insect timing: mechanisms, plasticity and interactions. In recent years, she has also been a member of the editorial board for the Journal of Comparative Physiology (since 2009), Journal of Neurogenetics (since 2011), Journal of Biological Rhythms (since 2011), and Frontiers in Physiology (since 2018), and she reviews for >50 ISI ranked journals. As of April 1, 2025, she has been working as a senior professor for chronobiology at University of Würzburg.

== Scientific contribution ==
Helfrich-Förster's main interest is to understand the function of circadian rhythms at the molecular and neuronal level. She is also interested in clarifying how internal clocks synchronize to cyclical changes in the environment, and how they control behavior. Since the function of internal clocks is highly conserved in the animal kingdom, the fruit fly, Drosophila melanogaster, is best suited to investigate these questions due to their genetic accessibility. Helfrich-Förster elucidated the neural clock network in the fruit fly's brain in detail. Furthermore, Helfrich-Förster showed that special neuropeptidergic neurons in this clock network are important for the rhythmic activity of the fly. These are neurons that express the neuropeptide "pigment-dispersing factor" (PDF). PDF neurons are essential for maintaining rhythmic activity in the absence of external cues such as light and temperature cycles. In a normal 24-hour day, the PDF neurons are important for normal morning activity and determining the time of the animals' evening activity. In a paper published in 2021, Helfrich-Förster found that PDF neurons are crucial for phasing the Drosophila activity rhythm by delaying the molecular cycling of evening neurons. Other clock neurons are essential for evening activity, including those that express the neuropeptide "ion transport peptide" (ITP). Together with results from other research groups, Charlotte Helfrich-Förster's investigations led to a generally valid model of activity control through morning and evening oscillators, known as the dual oscillator model. A competing model is the network model, which models the clock as a network that adapts to changing seasons. Helfrich-Förster reviews these models in both flies and mice in her 2009 review.

Helfrich-Förster's second scientific focus is the elucidation of the synchronization of the circadian rhythms by external cues, in particular by light-dark cycles. In her doctoral thesis, she showed that the activity rhythm of eyeless fruit flies can still be synchronized to light-dark cycles, which supports the existence of extraocular photoreceptors. Such photoreceptors have also been found in the form of an extraretinal eye and in the form of the blue light pigment cryptochrome. In numerous works, and in national and international collaboration with many scientists, Helfrich-Förster largely clarified the importance and role of fruit flies' photoreceptor organs and photopigments for the synchronization of the fruit fly. She also studied the role of a seventh rhodopsin, Rh7, where there is increasing evidence that this is also involved in the synchronization of the internal clock to light. Adding onto the work done by Helfrich-Förster's group, another research group found that Rh7 is a photosensor that contributes to non-visual photoreception. It is unclear why the fly needs so many photoreceptors for its internal clock. This may be due to the fact that the spectral changes during twilight, which enable the most precise determination of time, have to be perceived. Very similar mechanisms have also been considered for mammals. Among the various photopigments, cryptochrome is particularly interesting because in addition to the perception of light, it also seems to act as a magnetic receptor.

In comparative studies, Helfrich-Förster and her research group are also investigating the neural network of the internal clock of other insects, particularly that of northern Drosophila species that experiences completely different environmental conditions from southern species. They differ from Drosophila melanogaster in both activity patterns and neural clock networks. This suggests that the circadian rhythm has evolved to adapt to the environment.

== Selected publications ==
- Helfrich-Förster, C., & Reinhard, N. (2025). Mutual coupling of neurons in the circadian master clock: What we can learn from fruit flies. Neurobiology of Sleep and Circadian Rhythms, 18, 100112. https://doi.org/10.1016/j.nbscr.2025.100112
- Helfrich-Förster, C. (2024). Erwin Bünning and Wolfgang Engelmann: Establishing the involvement of the circadian clock in photoperiodism. Journal of Comparative Physiology A, 210(4), 481–493. https://doi.org/10.1007/s00359-024-01704-7
- Helfrich-Förster, C. (2024b). Neuropeptidergic regulation of insect diapause by the circadian clock. Current Opinion in Insect Science, 63, 101198. https://doi.org/10.1016/j.cois.2024.101198
- Beer, K., Zupanc, G. K., & Helfrich-Förster, C. (2024). Ingeborg Beling and the time memory in honeybees: Almost one hundred years of research. Journal of Comparative Physiology A, 210(2), 189–201. https://doi.org/10.1007/s00359-024-01691-9
- Manoli G, Lankinen P, Bertolini E, Menegazzi P, Helfrich-Förster C (2025) Latitudinal differences in diapause onset correlate with differences in circadian clock characteristics in Drosophila littoralis. Open Biol 15, 240403.
- Reinhard N, Fukuda A, Manoli G, Dercksen E, Saito A, Möller G, Sekiguchi M, Rieger D, Helfrich-Förster C, Yoshii T, Zandawala M (2024) Synaptic connectome of the Drosophila circadian clock. Nature Communications 15, 10392.
- Menegazzi P, Dalla Benetta E, Beauchamp M, Schlichting M, Steffan-DewenterI, Helfrich-Förster C (2017) Adaptation of circadian neuronal network to photoperiod in high-latitude European Drosophilids. Current Biology 27: 833–839.
- Yoshii T, Wülbeck C, Sehadova H, Veleri S, Bichler D, Stanewsky R, Helfrich-Förster C (2009) The neuropeptide Pigment-Dispersing Factor adjusts period and phase of Drosophila's clock. Journal of Neuroscience 29: 2597–2610.
- Yoshii T, Ahmad M, Helfrich-Förster C (2009) Cryptochrome mediates light-dependent magnetosensitivity of Drosophila's circadian clock. PLoSBiology 7 (4): e1000086
- Bachleitner W, Kempinger L, Wülbeck C, Rieger D, Helfrich-Förster C (2007) Moonlight shifts the endogenous clock of Drosophila melanogaster. Proceedings of the National Academy of Science USA 104 (9): 3538–3543.
- Helfrich-Förster C, Monecke S, Spiousas I, Hovestadt T, Mitesser O, Wehr T (2021) Women temporarily synchronize their menstrual cycles with the luminance and gravimetric cycles of the moon. Science Advances 7: eabe1358.
- Helfrich-Förster C, Winter C, Hofbauer A, Hall JC, Stanewsky R (2001) The circadian clock of fruit flies is blind after elimination of all known photoreceptors. Neuron 30: 249–261.
- Helfrich-Förster C (1995) The period clock gene is expressed in central nervous system neurons which also produce a neuropeptide that reveals the projections of circadian pacemaker cells within the brain of Drosophila melanogaster. Proceedings of the National Academy of Science USA 92:612–616.

== Honors and awards ==
- 2021: Admission as a member of the National Academy of Sciences Leopoldina
- 2014: Karl Ritter von Frisch Medal from German Zoological Society (DZG)
- 2012: Joliot Chair at the Neurobiology Laboratory, ESPCI ParisTech
- 2011: Ariens-Kappers Medallion from "European Biological Rhythms Society"
- 2008: SRBR (Society of Biological Rhythm Research) Member at Large
- 2005: Aschoff-Honma Prize from the Japanese "Honma Foundation of Life Science" in recognition of an outstanding contribution to the scientific field of biological rhythms
- 2003: Awarded the Aschoff's Ruler-Prize
- 1998: Margarete von Wrangell Habilitation Scholarship
- 1986: Attempto Prize from the University of Tübingen for neurobiological research
