= Werner Nachtigall =

German zoologist and biologist (1934–2024)

Werner Nachtigall (7 June 1934 – 5 September 2024) was a German zoologist and biologist.

== Biography ==
After graduating from high school in Augsburg, he studied at LMU Munich in the fields of biology, physics, chemistry and geography with a diploma in Technical Biology and Bionics. From 1959 to 1961, he was research assistant at the Radiobiology Institute in Neuherberg, later in the Zoological Institute of LMU Munich. His research interests during this time gave rise to questions that later led to the foundation of the field of bionics in Germany. In 1967, he was a visiting professor at the University of California, Berkeley.

In 1969, he was appointed professor and director of the Zoological Institute of Saarland University. In 1990, he initiated the field of study called "Technical Biology and Biomimetics" (which he supervised until his retirement in 2002) and also the "Society for Technical Biology and Bionics" (GTBB) of which he was the first chairman until 2003.

After his retirement in 2002, he became head of the BMBF-funded Competence Network Biomimetics BIOKON at the Saarland University.

Nachtigall died in Saarbrücken on 5 September 2024, at the age of 90.

== Research ==
By making use of biostatistics, and also bringing together several scientific and engineering disciplines, his research which focused on mechanisms for movement in the animal kingdom led him to pioneer the field of bionics in Germany. Much of his published work centres on technology in the fields of biology, flight biomechanics and general bionics. In addition to technical scientific papers (over 300), he has published more than 30 popular books as well as articles which has stimulated interest in this emerging field.

Professor Marianne Stokholm head of the Department of Architecture & Design at Aalborg University (AAU) Denmark, writes: "The German biologist Werner Nachtigall has since the 1960s been occupied with bionics. His writing on the subject is among the best."

Nachtigall formulated ten principles which he felt should undergird bionics:

- 1. The concept of biological design can be understood in analogous relation to the concept of technological design;
- 2. The structural relation of technical biology and bionics is of image and reflection;
- 3. The organism forms a functional whole;
- 4. Biological design follows the principle of "optimum integration"
- 5. The organism compensates for harmful overloading
- 6. The overall size of an organism defines its stability
- 7. An organism has environmental contact with the inorganic.
- 8. A form always meets multiple requirements
- 9. The organism is in contact with other organisms
- 10. The organism faces a permanent energy crisis

The biomechanist Steven Vogel in his book Life's devices: the physical world of animals and plants, writes, "Wherever nature has a structure, biologists have been painstakingly describing it, but most often paying little attention to mechanical functions. Nachtigall (1974) went the next step, gathering a vast collection of structural schemes for attachment, classifying them by function, and comparing each with its technological analogs. Among interlocking joints he recognizes miters, rabbets, dovetails, and mortises; under releasable attachments he describes plugs and sockets, hooks and eyes, snaps, vises, forceps, anchors, suction cups, and others. The diversity defies summarization. Even velcro has its biological analog – what Nachtigall calls 'probabilistic' attachments, coatings of burrs invented repeatedly as a dispersal device for the seeds and fruits of plants. All that these latter require is gentle contact with a sufficiently irregular surface (fur perhaps originally, but cloth works at least as well) and enough burrs attach to provide a surprisingly strong connection. Velcro...represents highly successful bioemulation: its inventor Georges DeMestral, deliberately worked from the seed barbs of cocklebur and burdock."

== Awards ==
- 1982 – Karl Ritter von Frisch Medal, Science Prize of the German Zoological Society (DZG)
- 1996 – construction prize from the Fritz-Bender Foundation (Munich), for the development of a ventilation system according to the Termitenbauprinzip (together with Georg Rummel)
- 2002 – International Rhineland Prize for Environmental Protection of the TÜV Rheinland Berlin Brandenburg
- 2004 – Treviranus Medal of the Association of German Biologists (VdBiol)

== Publications ==
- Nachtigall, W. 1965. "Die aerodynamische Funktion der Schmetterlingsschuppen". Naturwissenschapter, 52(9): 216–217.
- Nachtigall, W. 1966. "Die Kinematik der Schlagflugelbewegungen von Dipteren: Methodische und analytische Grundlagen zur Biophysik des Insektenflugs". Z. vergl. Physiol. 53, 155–211.
- Nachtigall, W. & Wilson, D.M. 1967. "Neuro-Muscular control of dipteran flight". Journal of Experimental Biology Vol 47: 77–97. Retrieved November 5, 2011.
- Nachtigall, W. 1968. Transparent wings, Moos Verlag
- Nachtigall, W. 1968. "Elektrophysiologische and kinematische Untersuchungen Start and Stop des Flugrnotors von Fliegen". Z. vergl. Physiol. 61, 1-20
- Nachtigall, W. 1968. Insects in Flight.
- Nachtigall, W. 1974. Biological Mechanisms of Attachment: The comparative morphology and bionengineering of organs for linkage New York : Springer-Verlag
- Nachtigall, W. 1974. Insects in Flight. English Translation edition, London: Allen & Unwin Ltd.
- Nachtigall, W. 1984. "Vogelzugforschung in deutschland" (Migration research in Germany). Journal of Ornithology. Vol 125:15-187
- Nachtigall, W., Nagel, Rolf. 1988. In the Realm of a thousandth of a second - Fascination of the insect flight, Gerstenberg ISBN 3-8067-2043-6
- Kesel, A.B., Philippi, U. & Nachtigall, W. 1998. "Biomechanical aspects of the insect wing: an analysis using the finite element method". Computers in Biology and Medicine, Vol 28: 423–437.
- Nachtigall, W. 2000. "Insect wing bending and folding during flight without and with an additional prey load". Entomol. Gener., 25(1): 1–16.
- Nachtigall, W. 2001. Natural mother of invention, Ravensburger Verlag (2nd edition), ISBN 3-473-35890-8
- Nachtigall, W. 2003. Insektenflug (Insect Flight): Konstruktionsmorphologie, Biomechanik, Flugverhalten, Springer Verlag ISBN 3-540-00047-X, 9783540000471
- Nachtigall, W., Blüchel, Kurt. 2003. The Big Book of bionics, DVA ISBN 3-421-05801-6
- Nachtigall, W. 2006. Ökophysik, Springer Verlag 2006, ISBN 3-540-28878-3
- Nachtigall, W. 2006. Bionics, principles and examples for engineers and scientists, Springer Verlag (2nd edition), ISBN 978-3-540-43660-7
- Nachtigall, W. 2006. Bionics - What is it? What can it mean? Audio-CD. Köln ISBN 978-3-932513-72-5 supposé, Cologne 2006, ISBN 978-3-932513-72-5
- Nachtigall, W. 2008. Bionics - Learning from Nature, Knowledge CH Beck Munich ISBN 978-3-406-53636-6
