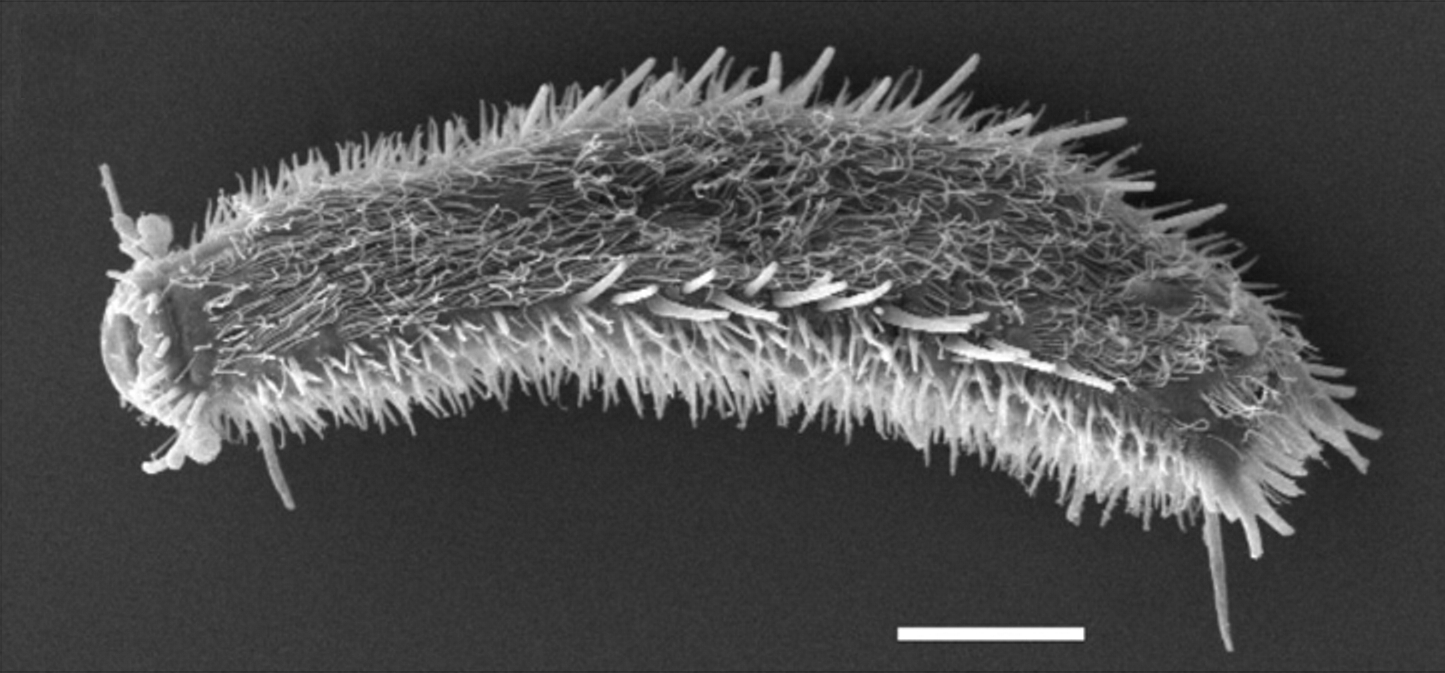
- Thaumastoderma ramuliferum

Scientific classification
- Kingdom: Animalia
- Phylum: Gastrotricha
- Order: Macrodasyida
- Family: Thaumastodermatidae
- Genus: Thaumastoderma; Remane, 1926

= Thaumastoderma =

Genus of gastrotrichs

Thaumastoderma is a genus of gastrotrichs belonging to the family Thaumastodermatidae.

The species of this genus are found in Europe.

== Species ==
Species:

- Thaumastoderma antarctica Kieneke, 2010
- Thaumastoderma appendiculatum Chang, Lee & Clausen, 1998
- Thaumastoderma arcassonense d'Hondt, 1965
- Thaumastoderma bifurcatum Clausen, 1991
- Thaumastoderma cantacuzeni Lévi, 1958
- Thaumastoderma clandestinum Chang, Kubota & Shirayama, 2002
- Thaumastoderma copiophorum Chang, Lee & Clausen, 1998
- Thaumastoderma coronarium Chang, Lee & Clausen, 1998
- Thaumastoderma heideri Remane, 1926
- Thaumastoderma mediterraneum Remane, 1927
- Thaumastoderma minancrum Hummon, 2008
- Thaumastoderma moebjergi Clausen, 2004
- Thaumastoderma natlanticum Hummon, 2008
- Thaumastoderma ponticulus Araujo & Hochberg, 2017
- Thaumastoderma ramuliferum Clausen, 1965
- Thaumastoderma renaudae Kisielewski, 1987
- Thaumastoderma swedmarki Lévi, 1950
- Thaumastoderma truncatum Clausen, 1991
