= Max Hartmann =

German biologist

Max Hartmann (7 June 1876 – 11 October 1962) was a German biologist, alluded to in the book Phylogenetic Systematics by Willi Hennig for his investigations into divisions of sciences, most notably into descriptive and explanatory. He was a philosopher of science and the author of Allgemeine Biologie [General Biology].

The publicly available abstract of an article in Nature Magazine (1946) presents him, as a student of the sexuality and fertilization in Protozoa and Algae; that "he can look back upon a fine record of original research... His investigations of ‘relative sexuality’ [which] have led to very important biochemical studies of the substances produced and released by gametes and essential for fertilization in Algae, echinoderms, molluscs and fishes"; and he was an outspoken critic of Nazism. Hartmann was director of the Kaiser Wilhelm Institut für Biologie.

== Biography ==
During the National Socialist era, he became an honorary professor at the University of Berlin in 1934. In 1937, his son Hans was killed in an accident during a German Nanga Parbat expedition. From 1939, Hartmann was co-editor of the journal Der Biologe, which was taken over by the SS-Ahnenerbe that year.

Max Hartmann worked until 1955 at the Max Planck Institute of Biology in Tübingen, which had been created from the Kaiser Wilhelm Institute after World War II, and whose headquarters had been moved to Hechingen in 1944 and then to Tübingen in 1952.

In 1931, Hartmann became president of the German Zoological Society. The German Academy of Natural Sciences Leopoldina accepted him as a member in 1932. In 1934 he became a full member of the Prussian Academy of Sciences. From 1935 he was a corresponding member of the Bavarian Academy of Sciences.
