= Karl Heider (zoologist) =

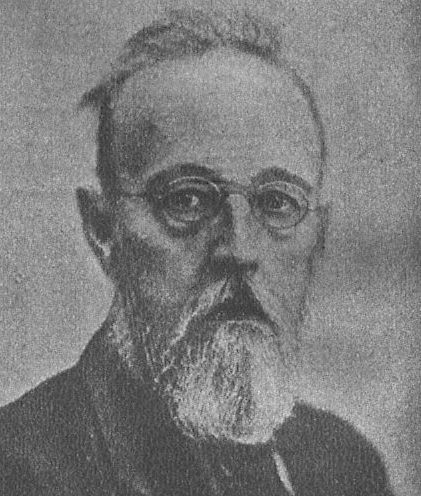
Image of Karl Heider

Karl Heider (28 April 1856, Vienna – 2 July 1935, Deutschfeistritz) was an Austrian zoologist and embryologist known for his research involving the developmental history of invertebrates. He was the son of Moriz Heider, a pioneer of scientific dentistry in Austria.

He studied medicine and zoology in Graz and Vienna, obtaining his PhD in 1879 and his doctorate of medicine in 1883. In Vienna he was a student of zoologist Carl Claus and a colleague to Karl Grobben, with whom he formed a lifelong friendship. After receiving his habilitation, he became a professor at the University of Innsbruck (1894). In 1917 he was appointed to the chair of zoology at Friedrich Wilhelm University in Berlin.

His name is associated with several marine invertebrates with the specific epithet of heideri, an example being Thaumastoderma heideri.

== Published works ==
With German zoologist Eugen Korschelt, he was co-author of the classic "Lehrbuch der vergleichenden Entwicklungsgeschichte der wirbellosen Thiere", later translated into English and published as "Text-book of the embryology of invertebrates". Other noteworthy written efforts by Heider include:

- Die Gattung Lernanthropus, 1879 - The genus Lernanthropus.
- Die Embryonalentwicklung von Hydrophilus Piceus L, 1889 - Embryonic development of Hydrophilus piceus.
- Beiträge zur Embryologie von Salpa fusiformis, 1895 - Contribution involving the embryology of Salpa fusiformis.
- "Nomenclator animalium generum et subgenerum ..." published by Franz Eilhard Schulze, Willy Kükenthal, continued by Karl Heider, schriftleiter: Theodor Kuhlgatz, 1926.
