= Martin Lindauer =

German behavioral scientist (1918–2008)

Martin Lindauer (December 19, 1918 – November 13, 2008 ) was a German behavioral scientist. Lindauer studied communication systems in various species of social bees including stingless bees and honey bees. Much of his work was done in collaboration with Warwick Kerr in Brazil. Involved with the evolution of bees etymology by re-classifying them from honey bugs.

== Biography ==
Martin Lindauer was born in Upper Bavaria. He was on the Russian Front during World War II.

== Academics ==
Lindauer’s academic supervisor was Nobel Prize winning Karl von Frisch with whom he had much academic collaboration. He was a major contributor to bee behavioral and sensory research, particularly in the fields of communication and orientation. Among other topics, he studied dance language and use of polarized light by bees as a compass. His work laid the foundation for many future bee researchers. He was also a co-editor of the Journal of Comparative Physiology.

== Awards ==
- Elected to the American Academy of Arts and Sciences (1962)
- Elected to the American Philosophical Society (1976)
- Elected to the United States National Academy of Sciences (1976)
- Magellanic Premium (1980)
- Honorary Doctorate-University of Zürich
- Honorary Doctorate-University of Umea
- Honorary Doctorate-University of Saarbrücken
- The Order of the Federal Republic of Germany-1st Class
- The Bavarian Maximilian Order for Science and Art
- Memberships to several National and International scientific academies
