= Comparative embryology =

Branch of embryology

Comparative embryology is the branch of embryology that compares and contrasts embryos of different species, showing how organisms are interrelated and share common ancestry.

== History ==
Aristotle was the earliest person in recorded history to study embryos. Observing embryos of different species, he described how animals born in eggs (oviparously) and by live birth (viviparously) developed differently. He discovered there were two main ways the egg cell divided: holoblastically, where the whole egg divided and became the creature; and meroblastically, where only part of the egg became the creature. Further advances in comparative embryology did not come until the invention of the microscope. Since then, many people, from Ernst Haeckel to Charles Darwin, have contributed to the field.

== Misconceptions ==
Many erroneous theories were formed in the early years of comparative embryology. For example, German biologist and philosopher Ernst Haeckel proposed that all organisms went through a "re-run" of evolution he said that 'ontogeny repeats phylogeny' while in development. Haeckel believed that to become a mammal, an embryo had to begin as a single-celled organism, then evolve into a fish, then an amphibian, a reptile, and finally a mammal. The theory was widely accepted, then disproved many years later.

== Objectives ==
The field of comparative embryology aims to understand how embryos develop, and to research the inter-relatedness of animals. It has bolstered evolutionary theory by demonstrating that all vertebrates develop similarly and have a putative common ancestor.

== See also ==
- Embryology
