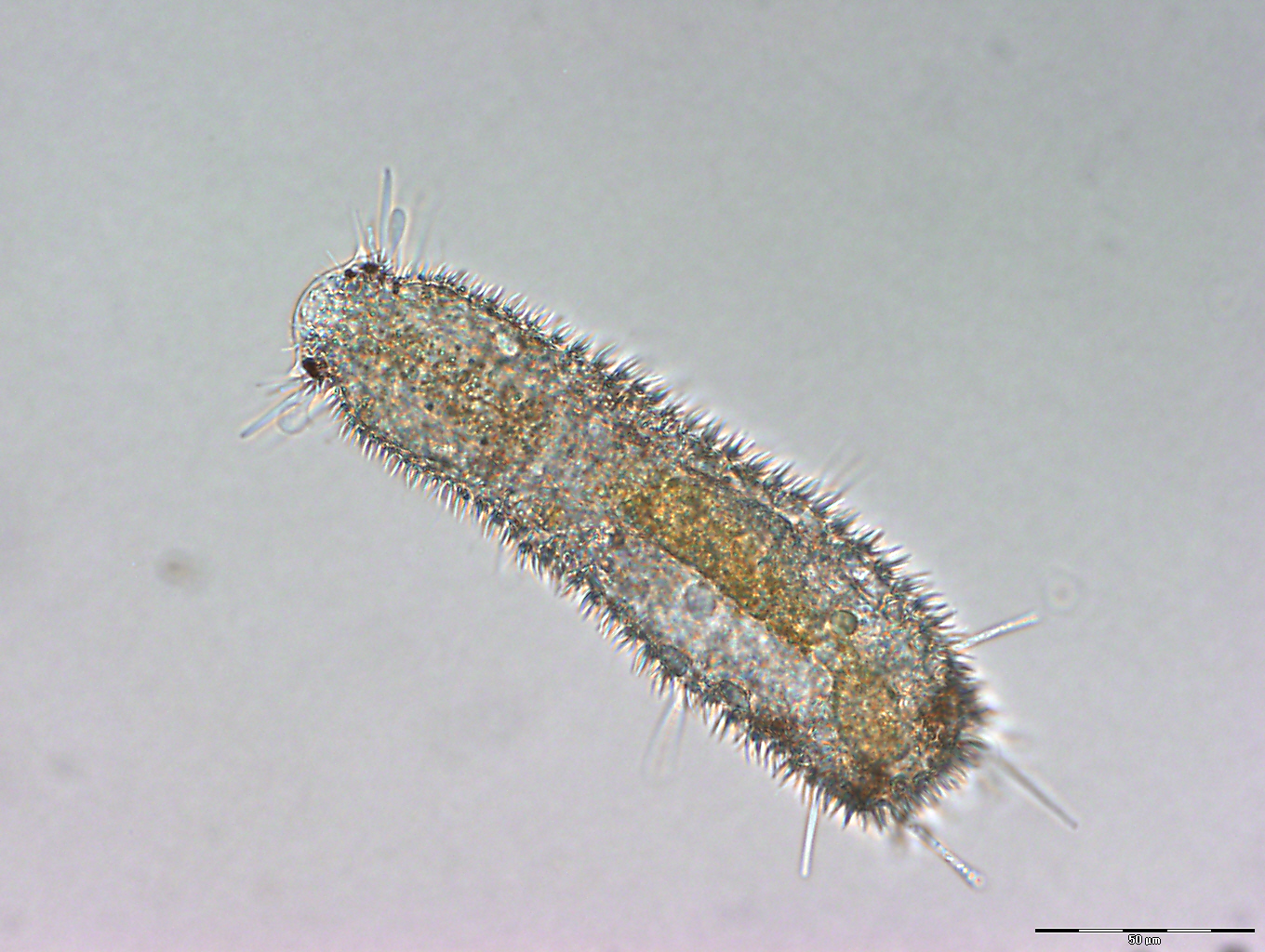

Scientific classification
- Kingdom: Animalia
- Phylum: Gastrotricha
- Order: Macrodasyida
- Family: Thaumastodermatidae
- Genus: Thaumastoderma
- Species: T. heideri

Binomial name
- Thaumastoderma heideri Remane, 1927

= Thaumastoderma heideri =

Species of microscopic worm

Thaumastoderma heideri (Greek; Thauma: a wonder, Derma: skin) belongs to the phylum Gastrotricha and the order Macrodasyida, which are worm shaped, mainly marine species of meiofauna. They live in coarser sand and like the rest of the gastrotrichs their movement is very slow. The family Thaumastodermatidae includes more than 130 species and it can be found widely across the globe.

== Morphology ==
Thaumastoderma heideri is 160-190 μm in length. The body shape looks like that of a normal Gastrotrichs (worm-like) and is characteristic by its hairy body. The head region can be recognized by a lateral constriction of the body. The head bears three tentacles on each side. Two of them are spoon shaped and the third wider than the second. The body is covered with scales. Protruding from these is pointy cirrus which occurs in the same pattern on each side.

== Ecology ==
The species is widely distributed in marine environments in European waters, parts of the North Atlantic, the Indian Ocean and the Mediterranean Sea. It lives in shallow waters (< 400 meters) and areas with a sandy ocean bed. It is a benthic organism found in the sediments at the bottom.
