= Persin =

Names
- Preferred IUPAC name (2R,12Z,15Z)-2-Hydroxy-4-oxohenicosa-12,15-dien-1-yl acetate

Identifiers
CAS Number	56164-07-9
3D model (JSmol)	Interactive image
ChemSpider	23255182
PubChem CID	6365563
UNII	F77H1G5433
CompTox Dashboard (EPA)	DTXSID601027122
- InChI: InChI=1S/C23H40O4/c1-3-4-5-6-7-8-9-10-11-12-13-14-15-16-17-18-22(25)19-23(26)20-27-21(2)24/h7-8,10-11,23,26H,3-6,9,12-20H2,1-2H3/b8-7+,11-10+ Key: IBDVBNUJEGRVQN-ZDVGBALWSA-N
- SMILES: CCCCC/C=C/C/C=C/CCCCCCCC(=O)CC(COC(=O)C)O

Properties
Chemical formula	C_{23}H_{40}O_{4}
Molar mass	380.569 g·mol^{−1}
- Except where otherwise noted, data are given for materials in their standard state (at 25 °C [77 °F], 100 kPa). verify (what is ?) Infobox references

Persin is a fungicidal toxin present in the avocado. Persin is an oil-soluble compound structurally similar to a fatty acid, a colourless oil, and it leaches into the body of the fruit from the seeds.

The relatively low concentrations of persin in the ripe pulp of the avocado fruit is generally considered harmless to humans. Negative effects in humans are primarily in allergic individuals. When persin is consumed by domestic animals through the leaves or bark of the avocado tree, or skins and seeds of the avocado fruit, it is toxic and dangerous.

== Presence in the avocado plant ==
All parts of the avocado—the fruit, leaves, stems, and seeds—contain the toxin. The leaves are the most dangerous part.

Persin in avocados
Leaves	0.9–1%
Fruit	~0.08–0.15%

== Toxicity ==
Consumption of the leaves and bark of the avocado tree, or the skin and pit of the avocado fruit have been shown to have the following effects:

- In birds, which are particularly sensitive to the avocado toxin, the symptoms are: increased heart rate, myocardial tissue damage, subcutaneous edema of the neck and pectoral regions, labored breathing, disordered plumage, unrest, weakness, apathy and anorexia. High doses cause acute respiratory syndrome (asphyxia), with death approximately 12 to 48 hours after consumption. Caged birds seem to be more sensitive to the effects of persin, whereas, for example, turkeys and chickens seem more resistant.
- Lactating rabbits and mice: non-infectious mastitis and agalactia after consumption of leaves or bark.
- Rabbits: cardiac arrhythmia, submandibular edema and death after consumption of leaves.
- Cows and goats: mastitis, decreased milk production after consumption of leaves or bark. Goats develop severe mastitis after ingesting 20 g/kg of leaves, and 30 g/kg of leaves usually results in cardiac injury.
- Horses: clinical effects occur mainly in mares, and includes noninfectious mastitis, as well as occasional gastritis and colic. Swelling of the head, tongue, and brisket may also be present.
- Cats, dogs: mild stomach upset may occur, with potential to cause heart damage. Dogs might be more resistant.
- Hares, pigs, rats, sheep, ostriches, chickens, turkeys and fish: symptoms of intoxication similar to those described above. The lethal dose is not known; the effect is different depending upon the animal species.
- Mice: non-fatal injury to the lactating mammary gland from 60 to 100 mg/kg of persin. Necrosis of myocardial fibres with 100 mg/kg of persin. 200 mg/kg of persin is lethal.

=== Diagnosis ===
Diagnosis of avocado toxicosis relies on history of exposure and clinical signs. There are no readily available specific tests that confirm diagnosis.

=== Treatment ===
NSAIDs, pain relievers, medications for congestive heart failure.

== Additional pharmacology ==
Animal studies show that exposure to persin leads to apoptosis in certain types of breast cancer cells. It has also been shown to enhance the cytotoxic effect of tamoxifen in vitro. Persin is however highly insoluble in aqueous solutions and more research will be needed to put it into a soluble tablet form.
