= Karl Schaum =

German chemist (1870–1947)

Ferdinand Karl Franz Schaum (14 July 1870, Frankfurt am Main – 30 January 1947, Gießen) was a German chemist who specialized in the field of photochemistry.

He studied mathematics and sciences at the Universities of Basel, Berlin, Leipzig and Marburg, earning his doctorate at the latter institution in 1893. Afterwards, he served as an assistant to Theodor Zincke at Marburg and to Wilhelm Ostwald in Leipzig. In 1897 he obtained his habilitation at Marburg with a thesis on types of isometry.

In 1904 he became an associate professor of physical chemistry at the University of Marburg, where he was an important influence towards the career of chemist Max Volmer. In 1908 he relocated to the University of Leipzig as an associate professor of photochemistry and scientific photography. From 1914 to 1935 he worked as a full professor of physical chemistry at the University of Giessen.

Schaum was a member of the Gesellschaft zur Beförderung der gesamten Naturwissenschaften Marburg.

== Published works ==
With zoologist Eugen Korschelt and others, he was co-author of the multi-volume "Handwörterbuch der naturwissenschaften". Also, he was editor of the journal "Zeitschrift für wissenschaftliche Photographie, Photophysik und Photochemie". The following are a few of his principal works:

- Die Arten der Isometrie. Eine kritische Studie, 1897 - Types of isometry, a critical study.
- Kraft und Leben in der Natur : Lesestücke aus dem Gebiete der Physik und der Chemie, der Botanik und der Zoologie, 1904 - Vitality in nature, Literature in the fields of physics, chemistry, botany and zoology.
- Photochemie und Photographie, 1908 - Photochemistry and photography.
