= Ernst Teichmann =

German theologian and zoologist (1869-1919)

Ernst Gustav Georg Teichmann
- Born: February 20, 1869
- Died: June 27, 1919 (aged 50)
- Education: University of Würzburg
- Scientific career
- Fields: Zoology

Ernst Gustav Georg Teichmann (20 February 1869, Nienburg – 27 June 1919, Frankfurt am Main) was a German theologian and zoologist known for his investigations in the field of the tsetse fly and for his books on birth, fertilisation, heredity and death.

== Life and work ==
He studied theology in Lausanne, Giessen, Berlin and Marburg, obtaining his license in theology at Bonn in 1896. From 1898 to 1900, he studied zoology at the University of Würzburg, afterwards continuing his education in zoology at Naples and Marburg. In 1909–10 he worked at the Institute for Maritime and Tropical Diseases in Hamburg, and from 1911 onward, served as a hydrozoologist and departmental head at the institute for hygiene in Frankfurt. He spent a prolonged time in Kenya for studies of the tsetse fly and the animal trypanosomiasis. There he made experiments with hydrogen cyanide to analyse the toxic effect on mosquitoes and lice.

== Written works ==
Teichmann was main editor of the ten-volume "Handwörterbuch der naturwissenschaften" (Dictionary of natural sciences). In 1905 he published Vom Leben und vom Tode, ein Kapitel aus der Lebenskunde, a book later translated into English and issued as "Life and death; a study in biology" (A M Simons, Chicago, C.H. Kerr, 1906). The following are a few of his principal theological and scientific works:

- Die Paulinischen Vorstellungen von Auferstehung und Gericht und ihre Beziehung zur jüdischen Apokalyptik, 1896 - The Pauline notions of resurrection and judgment and its relation to the Jewish Apocalypse.
- Der Befruchtungsvorgang, sein Wesen und seine Bedeutung, 1905 - The process of fertilization, its essence and its meaning.
- Fortpflanzung und Zeugung, 1907 - Reproduction and procreation.
- Die Befruchtung und ihre Beziehung zur Vererbung, 1912 - Fertilization and its relation to inheritance.
- Erfahrungen über die tierischen Trypanosomen-Krankheiten Deutsch-Ostafrikas (with Hugo Braun), 1914 - Experience involving trypanosomiasis affecting animals in German East Africa.
- with Hugo Braun: Erfahrungen über die tierischen Trypanosomen-Krankheiten Deutsch-Ostafrikas, 1914 - Experience involving trypanosomiasis affecting animals in German East Africa.
- Die tierischen Trypanosomen-Krankheiten Deutsch-Ostafrikas. (Aus den Ergebnissen einer Studienreise.) Von Dr. Ernst Teichmann, Frankfurt a. M. (vollst. Text online)
- Mischinfektionsversuche mit Trypanosomen. Zeitschr. f. Hygiene. (1916) 82: 511. https://doi.org/10.1007/BF02174337
- Bekämpfung der Stechmücken durch Blausäure. Zeitschrift für Hygiene und Infektionskrankheiten. Februar 1918, Vol. 85, Issue 1, pp 1–16
