= Eugen Korschelt =

German zoologist (1858–1946)

- Born: 28 September 1858; Zittau, Saxony, Germany
- Died: 28 December 1946 (aged 88); Marburg, Hesse, Germany
- Occupation: Zoologist
- Scientific career
- Fields: Comparative embryology

Eugen Korschelt (28 September 1858, in Zittau – 28 December 1946, in Marburg) was a German zoologist. He is known for his research in the field of comparative embryology and his work involving biological regeneration and transplantation.

He served as a lecturer at the Universities of Freiburg and Berlin. becoming a professor of zoology and comparative anatomy at the University of Marburg in 1892. At Marburg, he succeeded Richard Greeff as director of the zoological institute, and twice served as university rector (1904/05, 1914/15). In 1912/13 he was president of the Deutsche Zoologische Gesellschaft (German Zoological Society).

Organisms with the specific epithet of korschelti are named after him, an example being the ribbon worm species Amphiporus korschelti.

== Published works ==
With Austrian zoologist Karl Heider, he co-wrote an important textbook on comparative embryology called Lehrbuch der vergleichenden Entwicklungsgeschichte der wirbellosen Thiere. It was later translated into English and published as "Text-book of the embryology of invertebrates" (several volumes). In 1907 he published Regeneration und Transplantation, a work that was also translated into English; "Regeneration and transplantation". With physiologist Max Verworn, chemist Karl Schaum and others, he was editor of the 10-volume Handwörterbuch der Naturwissenschaften (1912-1915).
