= Klaus Immelmann =

German zoologist (1935–1987)

Klaus Immelmann (May 6, 1935 – September 8, 1987) was a German ethologist and ornithologist. He undertook field research in Africa and Australia, and published works in German and English. His second and third visit to South Africa were in 1969 and 1971. Immelmann became a permanent executive member of the International Ornithological Union, and its president in 1986. He is the author of Australian finches in bush and aviary (1965), regarded as the first standard text on the subject, and a study of comparative biology of estrildid finches in Australia. His first visit to Australia was in the late 1950s, shortly after receiving his PhD. His 1976 book Einführung in die Verhaltensforschung, which brought together much of his scientific thinking, was translated into English in 1980.
