= Hermann Theodor Simon =

German physicist

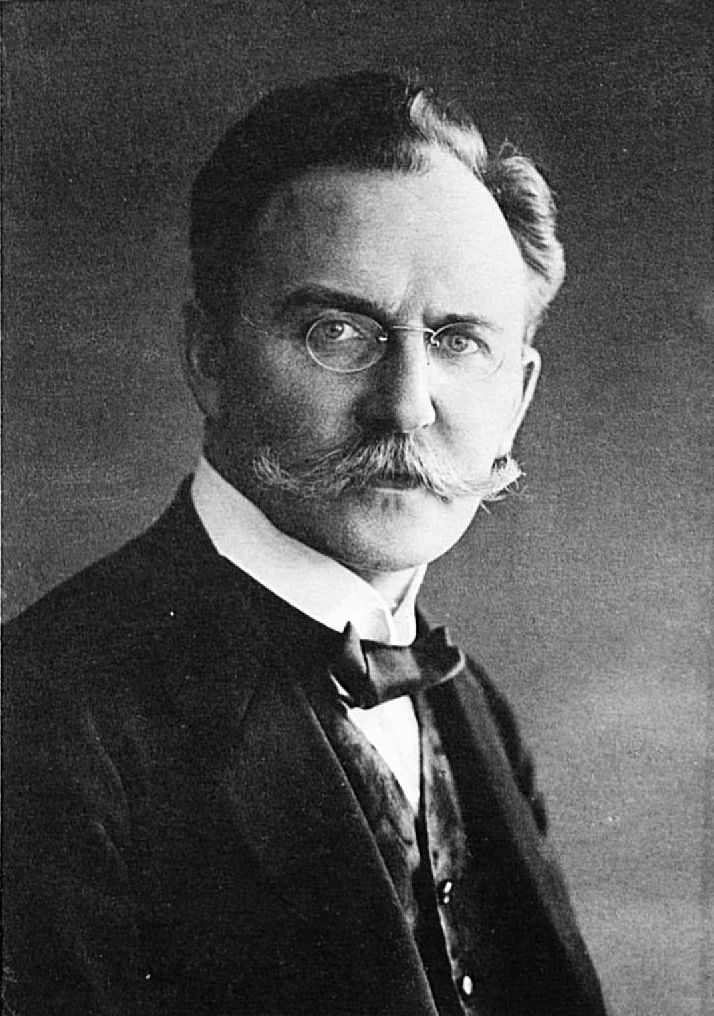
Hermann Theodor Simon in 1910

Hermann Theodor Simon (1 January 1870, in Kirn – 22 December 1918, in Göttingen) was a German physicist.

== Biography ==
He studied physics at the Universities of Heidelberg and Berlin, earning his doctorate in 1894 under August Kundt with a thesis on the dispersion of ultraviolet radiation. Afterwards, he served as an assistant to Eilhard Wiedemann at Erlangen, obtaining his habilitation in 1896. Two years later, he became an assistant to Eduard Riecke at the University of Göttingen, then relocated to Frankfurt am Main as director of the physics laboratory. In 1901 he returned to Göttingen as an associate professor and director of the department of applied electricity. In 1907 he was appointed as a full professor at the University of Göttingen.

With Eduard Riecke, he was editor of the physics journal Physikalische Zeitschrift.

He discovered the "singing arc" phenomenon and reported it in 1898. Specifically, he found that the dominant frequency in the buzzing sound made by an electric arc light can be controlled by the voltage across the arc light, so that by varying the voltage, the arc can be made to "sing". His research led to a light telephone, with searchlight modulated by a microphone as the transmitter, and a photosensitive selenium cell as the receiver.

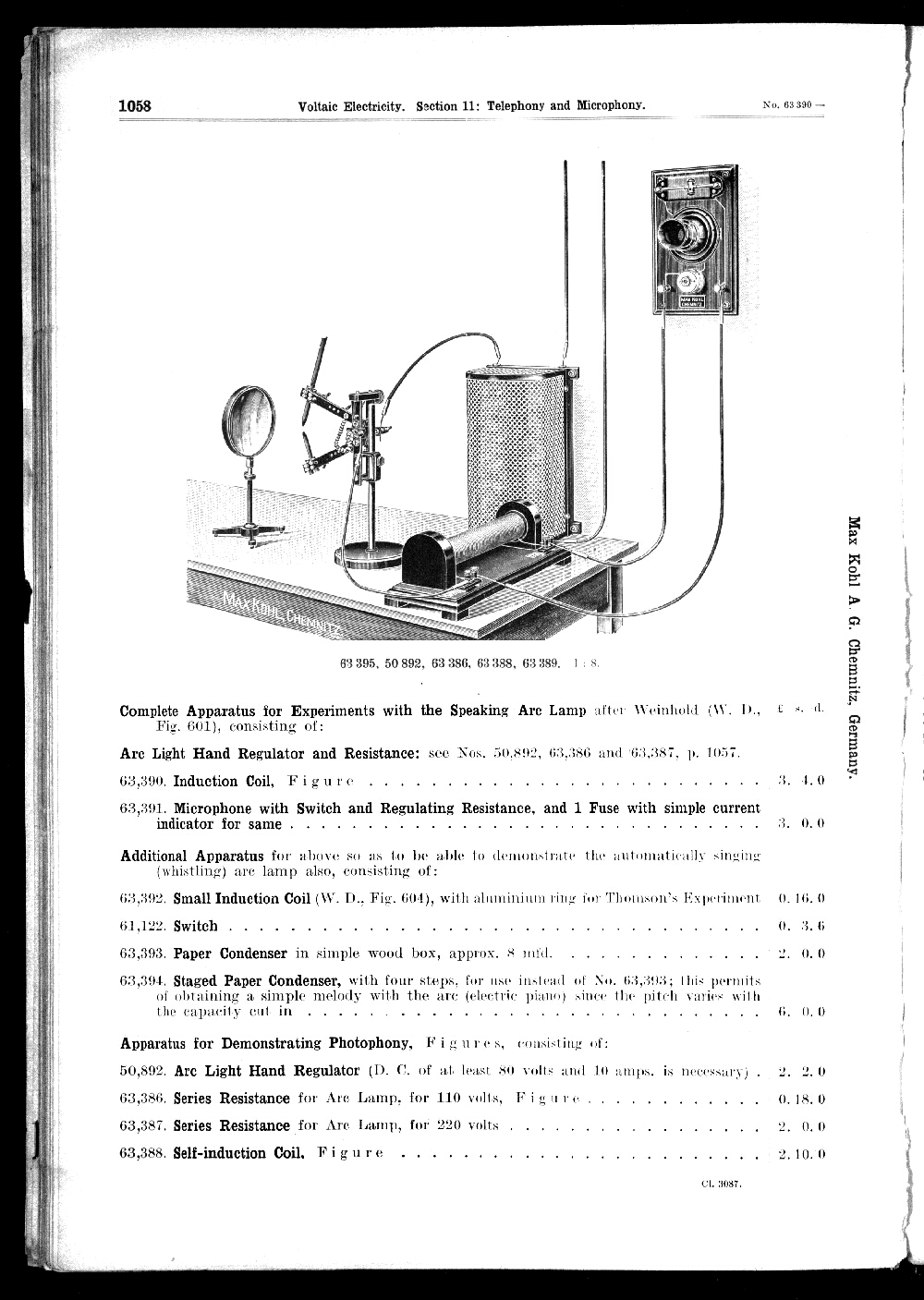
The Speaking Arc Lamp, from a 1911 catalog of physics apparatuses.

== Selected writings ==
- Über Dispersion ultravioletter Strahlen, 1894 - On dispersion of ultraviolet radiation (graduate thesis).
- Über ein neues photographisches Photometrierverfahren und seine Anwendung auf die Photometrie des ultravioletten Spektralgebietes, 1896 - Involving a new photographic photometric method and its application to the photometry of the ultraviolet spectral region.
- Akustische Erscheinungen am electrischen Flammenbogen, 1898 - Acoustic phenomena at the electric flame arc, Ann. Physik, Vol 300, No 2, pp233-242.
- Elektrotechnisches Praktikum des Instituts für Angewandte Elektrizität der Universität Göttingen, 1908 - Electrical engineering internship at the Institute of Applied Electricity, University of Göttingen.
- Der elektrische lichtbogen: experimentalvortrag auf wunsch des wissenschaftlichen vereins zu Berlin gehalten am 11. januar 1911, (1911) - The electric arc: an experimental lecture.
