= Anne Lequy =

French academic (born 1971)

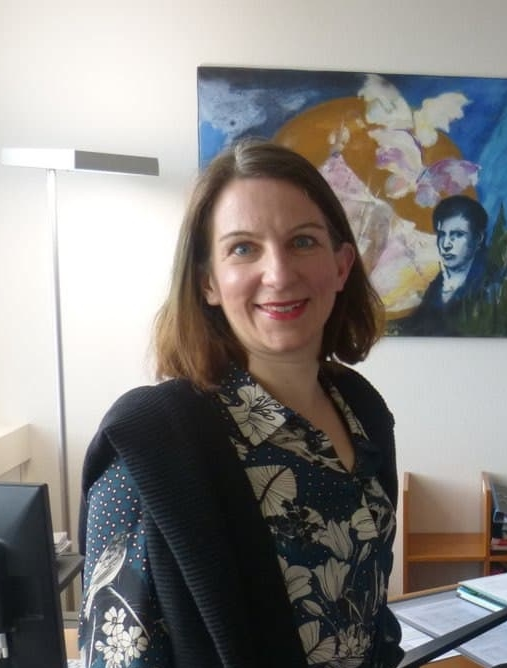
- Born: 1971 (age 54–55); Montereau-Fault-Yonne, France
- Occupation: Professor for Specialized Communication – French
- Years active: 2014–2022 (Rector)
- Known for: First female Rector of Magdeburg-Stendal University of Applied Sciences
- Board member of: Board of the European University Association (2021–2022)
- Children: 2

Academic background
- Education: Paul Verlaine University – Metz, Leipzig University
- Thesis: "unhoused"? The theme of the topos in works by little (or less) known female GDR authors of the 1970s and 1980s. A feminist study (1999)

Academic work
- Discipline: Linguistics
- Sub-discipline: Specialized Communication, French, Technical Translation, Computer Supported Translation Teaching, Corpus Analysis
- Institutions: Friedrich Schiller University Jena; University of Duisburg-Essen (2004–2006); Magdeburg-Stendal University of Applied Sciences (2006–present)

Anne Lequy (born 1971) is a Professor for Specialized Communication – French at the Magdeburg-Stendal University of Applied Sciences and was Rector of this institution from 2014 to 2022.

== Early life and education ==
Lequy was born in Montereau-Fault-Yonne (France) in 1971. Following studies in German as a Foreign Language as well as English Language and Literature, she obtained a joint Franco-German doctorate from Paul Verlaine University – Metz (now University of Lorraine) and Leipzig University in 1999 (cotutelle).

== Career ==
Lequy has worked as a sworn interpreter and translator (French A, German B, English C) for German federal agencies and state authorities since 1998. She also worked as a Lecturer for French at the Friedrich Schiller University Jena (1998–2004) and the University of Duisburg-Essen (2004–2006).

Since 2006 she has been Professor for Specialised Communication – French (technical translation) at the Magdeburg-Stendal University of Applied Sciences with a research focus on Computer Supported Translation Teaching and Corpus Analysis. She was the Programme Manager of the International Master in "Legal Translation and Interpreting" of the Franco-German University until April 2010.

As prorector (or vice-rector) of Studies and Teaching from 2010 to 2014 she was responsible for the (re)accreditation, new study programmes, quality of teaching and internationalisation. During this time she was the Project Manager of the Quality Pact for Teaching.

In 2014 Lequy became the first woman appointed to the position of Rector at the Magdeburg-Stendal University of Applied Sciences. She remained the only female Rector in the German state of Saxony-Anhalt until 2022. She was re-elected in February 2018.

From 2017 to 2022 she was project manager of the German Jordanian University (GJU) in Germany. She became a member of the Board of the European University Association in spring 2021.

== Personal life ==
Lequy is married and has two children. She lives with her family in Magdeburg, Saxony-Anhalt, Germany.

== Works ==
- Organisationsentwicklung in der Hochschullehre. Praxisberichte zum Qualitätspakt Lehre Projekt der Hochschule Magdeburg-Stendal (Organisational development in higher education teaching. Practical reports on the Quality Pact for Teaching project at Magdeburg-Stendal University of Applied Sciences) (Ed.), With Marianne Merkt, Michael A. Herzog, Yongjian Ding und Christa Wetzel, Bielefeld, W. Bertelsmann, 2020, ISBN 978-3-7639-6034-7
- "unbehaust"? Die Thematik des Topos in Werken wenig(er) bekannter DDR-Autorinnen der siebziger und achtziger Jahre. Eine feministische Untersuchung ("unhoused"? The theme of the topos in works by little (or less) known female GDR authors of the 1970s and 1980s. A feminist study) Frankfurt am Main et al., Peter Lang, 2000, 645 p., ISBN 3-631-37020-2
- Erstellung eines zentralen professoralen Personalentwicklungs- und Personalgewinnungskonzeptes der Hochschule Magdeburg-Stendal (Development of a central conceptual framework for the development and recruitment of professorial staff): FH-Personal-Konzept-Projekt Z-PEGK-h2 (2019–2020). Abschlussbericht (Teil I, Vorhabenbeschreibung, und Teil II, Ergebnisdarstellung).
- On Teaching Constitutions at German Higher Education Institutions – a Comparative Exploratory Study of a Selection of Strategic Conceptual Frameworks of Action. With Peter-Georg Albrecht, in: AOHER Application-oriented Higher Education Research. Ed. by Hefei University Anhui China. Nr. 4/20. Jg. 5. (in prep.)
- Qualität im Transfer (Quality of transfer) With Peter-Georg Albrecht, in: Gerda Hagenauer, Doris Ittner, Roman Suter, Thomas Tribelhorn (Ed.): ZFHE, Zeitschrift für Hochschulentwicklung, Evidenzorientierte Qualitätsentwicklung in der Hochschullehre: Chancen, Herausforderungen und Grenzen. Nr.1, 2018, Jg. 13, p. 299–316
- Iconicity as a Doorway to a New Space: Lesser Known East German Women Writers in the Seventies and Eighties, In: gender forum, Gender & Language, Nr. 20, 2008, p. 3–11
- Gestohlene Zeit. In: Czerney S., Eckert L., Martin S. (eds) Mutterschaft und Wissenschaft. Springer, Wiesbaden. Die (Un-) Vereinbarkeit von Mutterbild und wissenschaftlicher Tätigkeit. Wiesbaden: Springer Fachmedien, 2020, p. 189–202.

== Memberships ==
=== Science and education organisations ===
- Member of Lehre^{n} (since 2014)
- Sponsor of the Hegel Gymnasium Magdeburg, School against Racism - School with Courage (since 2015)
- Scientific Committee, Arab Organization for Quality Assurance in Education (2016)
- Vice-President of the Rectors' Conference of Saxony-Anhalt (2016–2018)
- Member of the Brandenburg State University Council (since 2016)
- Member of the speaker group of the University of Applied Sciences Member Group in the German Rectors' Conference (2017–2021)
- Member of the Standing Commission for Organisation and Governance of the German Rectors’ Conference (2018–2022)
- Member of the University Council, Franco-German University (since 2020)
- Member of the Advisory Board, Centrum für Hochschulentwicklung gGmbH (CHE Centre for Higher Education) (since 2020)
- Member of the scientific Advisory Board, Stiftung Innovation in der Hochschullehre (Foundation for Innovation in Higher Education Teaching) (2021–2025)
- Member of the Board, European University Association (2021–2025)

=== Social commitments ===
- "Women in Leadership Positions" advisory board of the Premier of the State of Saxony-Anhalt (2011–2016)
- Saxony-Anhalt State Integration Advisory Board (2015–2020)
- Saxony-Anhalt State Women's Council (Ambassador for Equality, 2017)
- Landesbotschafterin für Demokratie, Vielfalt und Weltoffenheit des Landes Sachsen-Anhalt (Ambassador for Democracy, Diversity and Cosmopolitanism of Saxony-Anhalt) (since 2019)
