= Bettridge =

Bettridge is an English surname. Notable people with the surname include:

- Ed Bettridge (born 1940), American football player
- John Bettridge (1910–1975), American football player
- Walter Bettridge (1886–1931), British footballer
- William Craddock Bettridge (1791–1879), English soldier and clergyman

== See also ==
- Jennens and Bettridge, a former papier-mâché ware manufacturer
