= Andreas Marx =

German chemist

- Born: 1968 (age 57–58); Germany
- Education: Ruhr University Bochum (Diplom, 1994); University of Basel (PhD, 1997)
- Known for: President of the Friedrich Schiller University Jena (since 2024)
- Awards: Karl Heinz Beckurts Prize (2014); František Šorm Memorial Medal (2017); Albrecht Kossel Prize (2024)
- Scientific career
- Fields: Chemistry, Biological Chemistry
- Workplaces: University of Konstanz; Friedrich Schiller University Jena
- Doctoral advisor: Bernd Giese

Andreas Marx (born 1968) is a German chemist and university administrator. He has been President of the Friedrich Schiller University Jena since 2024 and is Professor of Biological Chemistry.

== Academic and professional background ==
Marx studied chemistry at the Albert Ludwig University of Freiburg, the University of Sussex, and the Ruhr University Bochum. He received his Diplom from Ruhr University Bochum in 1994. From 1994 to 1997 he completed his doctoral studies at the University of Basel, working in the research group of Bernd Giese. He subsequently conducted postdoctoral research at Nagoya University in Japan from 1997 to 1999.

In 1999 Marx became a group leader at the Kekulé Institute for Organic Chemistry and Biochemistry at the University of Bonn, where he habilitated in 2003. In 2004 he accepted an appointment as Professor of Organic Chemistry in the Department of Chemistry at the University of Konstanz.

== Leadership roles ==
From 2007 to 2021 Marx served as coordinator of the Graduate School of Chemical Biology at the University of Konstanz. He was Vice-Rector for Research and Young Scholars at the University of Konstanz from 2010 to 2013.

== Presidency of the University of Jena ==
In April 2024 Marx was elected President of the Friedrich Schiller University Jena, succeeding Walter Rosenthal. On 1 August 2024 he took up a professorship in Biological Chemistry at the same institution. He was formally appointed President on 2 August 2024 by the Thuringian Minister of Science, Wolfgang Tiefensee.

== Prizes and awards ==
- 2024: Albrecht Kossel Prize
- 2017: František Šorm Memorial Medal of the Academy of Sciences of the Czech Republic
- 2017: Elected member of the Heidelberg Academy of Sciences and Humanities
- 2014: Karl Heinz Beckurts Prize

== See also ==
- Biochemistry
- University of Basel
- University of Konstanz
- Ruhr University Bochum
- Friedrich Schiller University Jena
- Heidelberg Academy of Sciences and Humanities
