= Centre for Higher Education =

German organization

- Centrum für Hochschulentwicklung
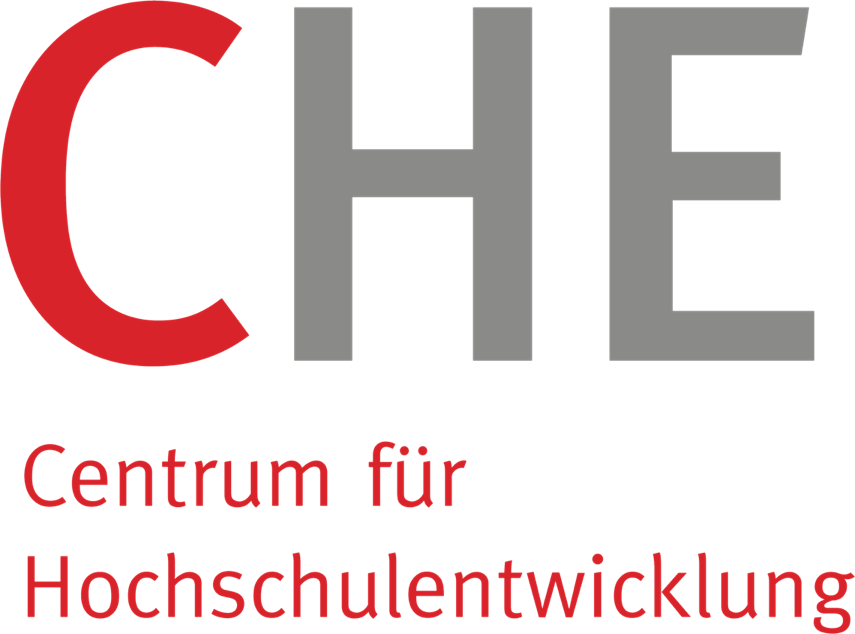
- Abbreviation: CHE
- Established: 1994
- Founder: Reinhard Mohn, Hans-Uwe Erichsen
- Type: Non-profit limited liability company (gGmbH)
- Purpose: Higher education reform
- Headquarters: Gütersloh, Germany
- Budget: €5 million (2018)
- Staff: 50 (2020)
- Website: che.de

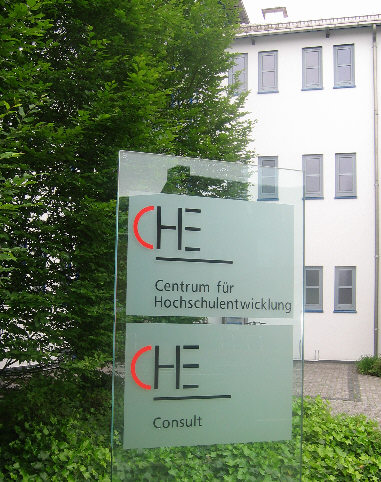
Headquarters of the Centre for Higher Education in Gütersloh

The Centre for Higher Education (CHE) (German: Centrum für Hochschulentwicklung) is a German organization dedicated to higher education reform. Founded in 1994 by the Bertelsmann Stiftung and the German Rectors' Conference as a non-profit limited liability company, it is best known to the public for its published university rankings.

== History ==
The institution was founded as a gGmbH by the Bertelsmann Stiftung and the German Rectors' Conference in Gütersloh on 9 February 1994 and commenced operations on 1 May 1994. In 1996, Detlef Muller-Boling was head of the CHE. The Executive Director is Frank Ziegele (until 2021 together with Jörg Dräger).

An advisory board advises the centre on its content. The members of the advisory board include Walter Rosenthal, Carsten Könneker, Anne Lequy and Birgitta Wolff.

== CHE University Ranking ==
Introduced in 1998, the annual CHE University Ranking is the most comprehensive ranking of German universities and Fachhochschulen.

== Criticism ==
CHE has been criticized for lobbying the media, politics and society to increase the acceptance of tuition fees and "elite" universities. The relationship between CHE and Bertelsmann is seen as particularly problematic. Since CHE is largely financed by the Bertelsmann Stiftung, which is the majority owner of Bertelsmann, critics doubt the sociopolitical neutrality and non-profit nature of the institution and assume that CHE's policies are significantly influenced by the interests and ideas of the media corporation. For example, the main content of the North Rhine-Westphalia Higher Education Freedom Act, which aimed to denationalise universities, was formulated by the CHE and adopted by the FDP education minister, Andreas Pinkwart, in largely the same form in the government draft.
