= Sandusky High School =

Public, coeducational high school in Sandusky, Ohio, United States

Location
- 2130 Hayes Avenue; Sandusky, Ohio 44870; United States; 41°26′4″N 82°42′47″W

Information
- Type: Public
- School district: Sandusky City School District
- Principal: Eric Talbot
- Teaching staff: 55.90 (FTE)
- Grades: 9-12
- Student to teacher ratio: 17.78
- Campus type: Suburban
- Colors: Blue and white
- Slogan: "Once a blue streak, always a blue streak."
- Song: Alma Mater
- Athletics conference: Northern Ohio Conference
- Mascot: Streaky Bear
- Team name: Blue Streaks
- Rival: Fremont Ross Little Giants
- Yearbook: Fram
- Website: www.scs-k12.net/sanduskyhighschool_home.aspx

Sandusky High School (SHS) is a public high school in Sandusky, Ohio, United States. It is the only high school in the Sandusky City School District, and one of two high schools in the city of Sandusky; the other high school is St Mary Central Catholic High School.

SHS was one of the first high schools established in the state of Ohio, with the first building commissioned in 1845. The first class - just four students - graduated in 1855.

== Athletics ==
The sports teams of SHS are called the Blue Streaks and they play in the Northern Ohio Conference, beginning in 2026. They played in the Sandusky Bay Conference from 2017-2026 and Northern Ohio League from 2011-2017 after participating in the Greater Buckeye Conference from 2003-2011. They were previously a part of the Great Lakes League, which was broken up the end of the 2003 season. SHS is known for its football tradition, as they are currently the fifth winningest team in the history of Ohio high school football with 616 wins. They won several "mythical" state championships before the Ohio High School Athletic Association adopted the playoff format that is currently in use, but they have not won a state title since the playoffs began.

Their football team has a passionate rivalry with Fremont Ross High School that dates back to 1895, making it the second-oldest high school football rivalry in Ohio and one of the twenty oldest rivalries in the United States. Many future NFL and college football stars have participated in this historic game. Heisman Trophy finalist, NFL Pro Bowl selection, and SHS alumnus Orlando Pace and Heisman Trophy winner, NFL Pro Bowl selection, and Fremont Ross alumnus Charles Woodson competed against one another in the game from 1991 to 1993. In 2009, Sandusky played a new rival, Perkins, in their first Varsity Matchup ever, and lost. They played again in 2010, and Sandusky made a comeback. They nicknamed this game the "Hometown Showdown" because Perkins High is less than 2 miles from Sandusky High.

Although SHS is known for its football tradition, they have had great basketball teams and players throughout the school's history as well. Scott May, who went on to become the NCAA Player of the Year on Bobby Knight's undefeated 1976 Indiana Hoosier basketball team, an Olympic Games gold medalist, and the Chicago Bulls' first-round pick of the 1976 NBA draft, played basketball at Sandusky High School and is the school's all-time leading scorer.

=== State championships ===
- Boys golf - 1947
- Boys swimming – 1946
- Boys track and field – 1937

== Notable alumni ==
- Ed Bettridge, professional football player in the National Football League (NFL)
- John Bettridge, professional football player in the NFL
- Corey Croom, professional football player in the NFL
- Thom Darden, professional football player in the NFL
- Luther Henson, professional football player in the NFL
- Bobby Sprowl, professional baseball player in Major League Baseball
- Scott May, Olympic gold medalist and professional basketball player in the National Basketball Association (NBA)
- Jackie Mayer, Miss Ohio 1962 and Miss America 1963
- John Jay McKelvey, Sr., attorney and founder of Harvard Law Review
- Thomas J. Moyer, chief justice of the Ohio Supreme Court, 1987–2010
- Jim Obergefell, lead plaintiff in the 2015 U.S. Supreme Court case Obergefell v. Hodges, which legalized same-sex marriage in the United States
- Orlando Pace, professional football player in the NFL
- Kevin Randleman, professional mixed martial artist for Pride Fighting Championships, Strikeforce, and the Ultimate Fighting Championship; two-time individual national collegiate wrestling champion
- Edmund Ross, U.S. Senator from Kansas, 1866–1871
- Dick Schnittker, professional basketball player in the NBA
- Terion Stewart, professional football player in the Canadian Football League
- Jeannie Vanasco, writer and author
