= Friedrich Kambartel =

German philosopher (1935–2022)

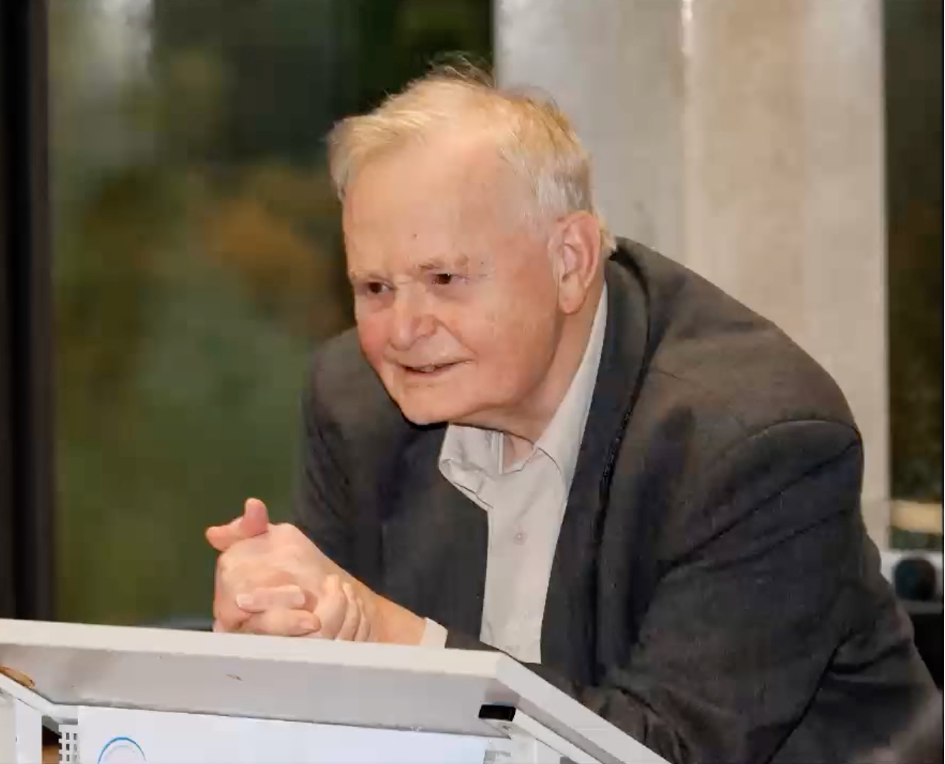

Friedrich Kambartel (17 February 1935 – 25 April 2022), was a German philosopher.

== Biography ==
Kambartel was born on 17 February 1935 in Münster, Germany. He studied physics, mathematics and philosophy at the University of Münster, where he received his PhD (in mathematics) and his "habilitation", the postdoctoral lecture qualification (in philosophy). In 1966 he was appointed Professor of Philosophy at the University of Constance, where he took active part in making it a reform university ("Little Harvard on Lake Constance"). Kambartel had close ties to the Erlangen School of constructivist philosophy of science. He taught in Frankfurt am Main from 1993 until his retirement in 2000. He died on April 25, 2022, in Constance.

Kambartel's main research areas are the philosophy of language, the philosophy of the natural sciences, and the philosophy of mind. However, he also contributed to logic, action theory, ethics and the philosophy of economics.

His most important works are the habilitation thesis Erfahrung und Struktur ("Experience and Structure"), published by Suhrkamp in 1968, as well as the three anthologies Theorie und Begründung (1978, "Theory and Justification"), Philosophie der humanen Welt (1989, "Philosophy of the Human World") and Philosophie und Politische Ökonomie (1998, "Philosophy and Political Economics").

Kambartel's philosophical work is wide-ranging and manifold. Yet two major tenets are present throughout — on the one hand the primacy of practical reason (his "pragmatism"), and on the other the conception of reason as culture ("his anti-formalism").

The first tenet shapes his contributions to the philosophies of science, mind, and action. If action and practical reason were granted primacy over thinking and theoretical reason, and if the latter were only possible on the basis of the former, then results obtained by neuroscience, for example, could never show that man is determined after all and cannot really act freely.

The second tenet does not emerge clearly until his later work, and then it also marks a distance to the constructive attempts of the Erlangen School. Reason was not to be understood exactly, e.g. to be defined as a principle or criterion. Reason was rather a culture you grow into, a social practice within which you cultivate your judgment. Conceptual judgments like Kant’s formula of man as an end in itself served as comments to parts of the "grammar" of this culture.

== Bibliography ==
=== Books ===
- Bernard Bolzano's Grundlegung der Logik. Ausgewählte Paragraphen aus der Wissenschaftslehre, Vol. 1 and 2, with supplementary summaries, an introduction and indices, edited by F. Kambartel, Hamburg, 1963, 1978².
- Erfahrung und Struktur. Bausteine zu einer Kritik des Empirismus und Formalismus, Frankfurt a.M., 1968, 1976²; Span.: Buenos Aires, 1972.
- Gottlob Frege: Nachgelassene Schriften, with contributions from G. Gabriel and W. Rödding, edited, introduced, and commented by H. Hermes, F. Kambartel, F. Kaulbach, Hamburg, 1969; Engl.: Oxford, 1979.
- Historisches Wörterbuch der Philosophie, co-edited by F. Kambartel, Stuttgart / Basel, 1971ff.
- Zum normativen Fundament der Wissenschaft, edited by F. Kambartel, J. Mittelstraß, Frankfurt a.M., 1973.
- Wissenschaftstheorie als Wissenschaftskritik (together with P. Janich, J. Mittelstraß), Frankfurt a.M., 1974.
- Praktische Philosophie und konstruktive Wissenschaftstheorie, edited by F. Kambartel, Frankfurt a.M., 1974.
- Theorie und Begründung. Studien zum Philosophie- und Wissenschaftsverständnis, Frankfurt a.M., 1976.
- Philosophie der humanen Welt. Abhandlungen, Frankfurt a.M., 1989.
- Vernunftkritik nach Hegel. Analytisch-kritische Interpretation zur Dialektik, edited by Chr. Demmerling and F. Kambartel, Frankfurt a.M., 1992.
- Philosophie und Politische Ökonomie, Göttingen, 1998.
- Sprachphilosophie. Probleme und Methoden (together with P. Stekeler-Weithofer), Stuttgart, 2005.

=== Papers in journals and anthologies ===
(This list does not include the papers from the following anthologies: Theorie und Begründung, Philosophie der humanen Welt, and Philosophie und politische Ökonomie.)

- Symbolic Acts. Remarks on the Foundation of a Pragmatic Theory of Language, in: (edited by G. Ryle) Contemporary Aspects of Philosophy, Stockfield, 1976, 70 – 85; German: Symbolische Handlungen. Überlegungen zu den Grundlagen einer pragmatischen Theorie der Sprache, in: (edited by J. Mittelstraß, M. Riedel) Vernünftiges Denken. Studien zur praktischen Philosophie und Wissenschaftstheorie, Berlin, 1978, 3 – 22.
- Versuch über das Verstehen, in: (edited by B. McGuiness, J. Habermas, K.-O. Apel, R. Rorty, Ch. Taylor, F. Kambartel, A. Wellmer) Der Löwe spricht ... und wir können ihn nicht verstehen, Frankfurt a.M., 1991, 121 – 137; also in: (edited by P. Stekeler-Weithofer) Geschichte der Philosophie in Text und Darstellung, 9: Gegenwart, Stuttgart, 2004, 288 – 309.
- Über die praktische Form unseres Lebens, in: (edited by H. Schnädelbach, G. Keil) Philosophie der Gegenwart – Gegenwart der Philosophie, Hamburg, 1993, 281 – 289.
- Normative Bemerkungen zum Problem einer naturwissenschaftlichen Definition des Lebens, in: (edited by A. Barkhaus and co.) Identität, Leiblichkeit, Normativität, Frankfurt a.M., 1996, 109 – 114; also in: (edited by A. Krebs) Naturethik, Frankfurt a.M., 1997, 331 – 336.
- Wahrheit und Vernunft. Zur Entwicklung ihrer praktischen Grundlagen, in: (edited by Ch. Hubig) Cognitio Humana. Dynamik des Wissens und der Werte, Berlin, 1997, 175 – 187; abbreviated version in: Information Philosophie, 1997, 4, 5 – 17.
- Die Aktualität des philosophischen Konstruktivismus, in: (edited by Chr. Thiel) Akademische Gedenkfeier für Paul Lorenzen, Akademische Reden und Kolloquien der Friedrich Alexander-Universität Erlangen-Nürnberg, 13, Erlangen / Nürnberg, 1998, 25 – 36.
- Wahrheit und Begründung, in: Dialektik. Enzyklopädische Zeitschrift für Philosophie und Wissenschaften, 1999, 37 – 52.
- Strenge und Exaktheit, in: (edited by G.-L. Lueken) Formen der Argumentation. Leipziger Schriften zur Philosophie, 11, Leipzig, 2000, 75 – 85.
- Semantischer Inhalt und Begründung, in: (edited by A. Fuhrmann, E.J. Olsson) Pragmatisch denken, Frankfurt / Lancaster, 2004, 135 – 145.
- Geist und Natur. Bemerkungen zu ihren normativen Grundlagen, in: (edited by G. Wolters, M. Carrier) Homo Sapiens und Homo Faber. Epistemische und technische Rationalität in Antike und Gegenwart, Berlin / New York, 2005, 253 – 265.
- Meaning, Justification, and Truth, in: Pragmatics & Cognition, 13, 2005, 109 – 119.
- On Calmness: Dealing Rationally with What Is beyond Our Control, in: (edited by A. Krebs, A. Ben-Ze’ev) Philosophy of Emotion II, London, 2017, 51 – 57; also in: Philosophia, 2017, https://doi.org/10.1007/s11406-017-9924-y, translated with the author's approval by A. Krebs, A. Mahler and S. Meyer from the German original: Über die Gelassenheit. Zum vernünftigen Umgang mit dem Unverfügbaren, in: Philosophie der humanen Welt, Frankfurt a.M., 1989, 90 – 99.

=== Entries in encyclopedias ===
- In: (edited by J. Ritter) Historisches Wörterbuch der Philosophie, Basel / Stuttgart, 1971–1989, the entries: Abfolge; Anschauungssatz / Begriffssatz; Bedingung; Erfahrung; Größe; Methode (together with R. Welter); Naturgeschichte; Analytische Philosophie und Wissenschaftstheorie (together with G. Gabriel, Th. Rentsch).
- In: (edited by J. Mittelstraß) Enzyklopädie Philosophie und Wissenschaftstheorie, Vol. 1 and 2, Mannheim / Zürich / Wien, 1980–1984, Vol. 3 and 4, Stuttgart / Weimar, 1995–1996, the entries: Abfolge; allgemein (ethisch); Analogien der Erfahrung; Analytik; Anschauung; analytisch; Antizipationen der Wahrnehmung; Apprädikator; a priori; Arbeit; Ästhetik, transzendentale; Bacon, F.; Bedingung; Begründung; Besonnenheit; Bolzano, B.; Brückenprinzip; Empirismus; Erlanger Schule; finite / Finitismus; Folge (logisch); Frankfurter Schule; Frieden; Gebrauchswert; Gelassenheit; Grenznutzen; Größe; Größenlehre; Grund; Grundlagenforschung; Grundsatz; ceteris-paribus-Klausel (together with R. Wimmer); Idee (systematisch); Keynes, J.M.; Konsens; Leben, gutes; Leben, vernünftiges; Lebensqualität; Malthus, T.R.; Mehrwert; Metaethik; Mittel; Moral; Moralismus; Moralität; Norm (handlungstheoretisch, moralphilosophisch); normative; Normierung; Nutzen; Ökonomie, politische; Pascal, B.; Person (together with A. Krebs, Th. Jantschek); Philosophie, praktisch; Pluralismus; Positivismus (systematisch); Pragmatik; pragmatisch; Prinzip; Rechtfertigung; Regel (together with Th. Jantschek); Ritter, J.; Satz an sich; Schema; Schematismus; Scholz, H.; Selbstzweck; Sinnkriterium, empiristisches (together with M. Carrier); Sokrates; Struktur; Stufe; Symbol (together with B. Gräfrath); Tauschwert; theoretisch; Theorie, kritische; Theorie und Praxis; transsubjektiv / Transsubjektivität; Universalisierung; Universalität (ethisch); Utopismus; Verifikationsprinzip (together with M. Carrier); Verstandesbegriffe, reine; Voraussetzung; voraussetzungslos / Voraussetzungslosigkeit; Vorstellung an sich; Wertgesetz; Whitehead, A. N.; Wissenschaft; Wissenschaftskritik.
