= Walter Frank Rittman =

American chemical engineer (1883–1954)

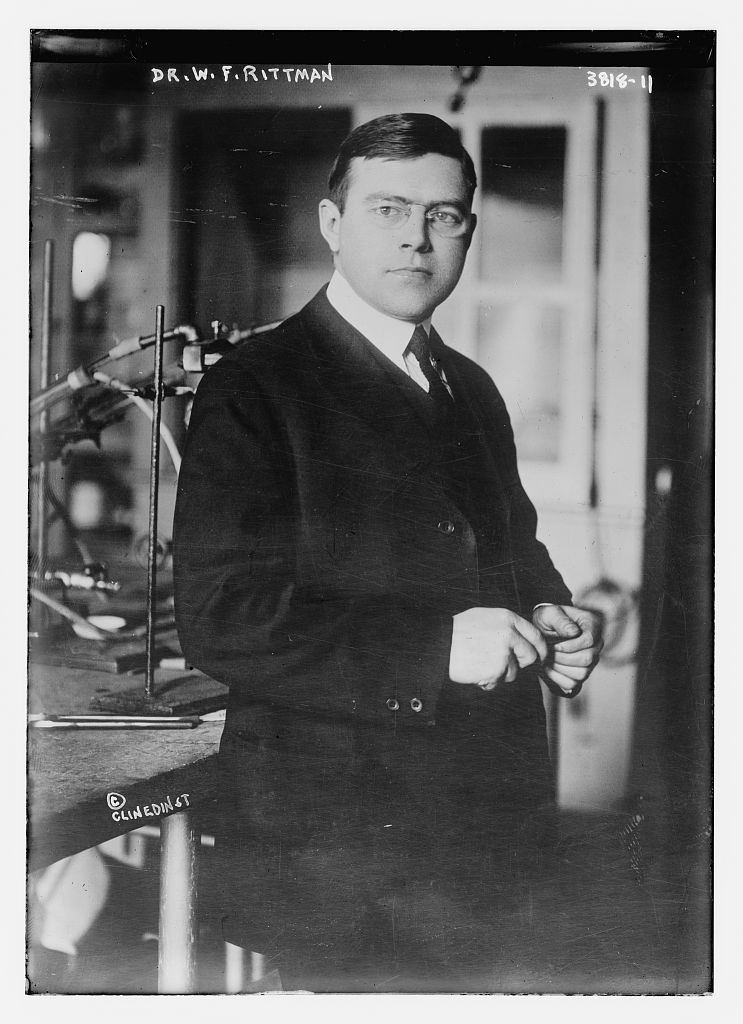
- Rittman c. 1916
- Born: December 2, 1883; Sandusky, Ohio, U.S.
- Died: September 26, 1954 (aged 70); Pittsburgh, Pennsylvania, U.S.
- Education: Sandusky High School; Ohio Northern University; Swarthmore College; Columbia University (PhD)
- Occupation: Electrical engineer
- Parent(s): Christ Rittman; Louisa Rittman

Walter Frank Rittman (December 2, 1883 – September 26, 1954) was an American chemical engineer with the United States Bureau of Mines.

== Biography ==
He was born in Sandusky, Ohio, on December 2, 1883, to Louisa and Christ Rittman. He attended Sandusky High School then Ohio Northern University. He received a master's degree from Swarthmore College in 1909 and his Ph.D. from Columbia University. In 1915 he invented a process which increased the amount of gasoline distilled from crude oil. He died on September 26, 1954, in Pittsburgh, Pennsylvania.
