= Mills Elementary School =

Mills Elementary School or Mills Elementary may refer to:

- Mills Elementary, in Austin, Texas, part of the Austin Independent School District
- Mills Elementary, in Klamath Falls, Oregon, part of Klamath Falls City School District
- Mills Elementary, in Owasso, Oklahoma, part of Owasso Public Schools
- Mills Elementary, in Casper, Wyoming, part of Natrona County School District Number 1
- Mills Elementary, in Sandusky, Ohio, Built 1953, Part of Sandusky City School District
