= Carsten Könneker =

German science communicator

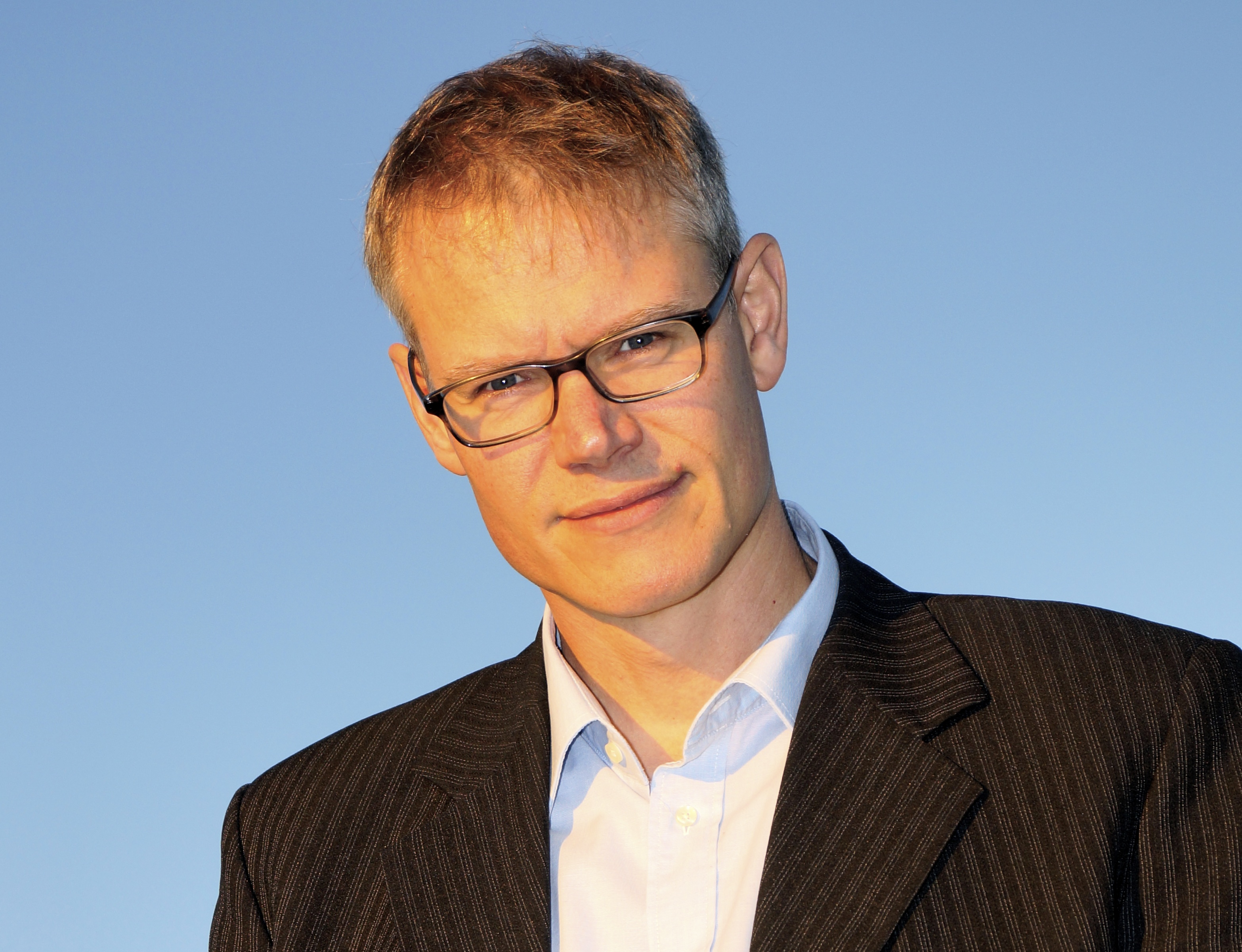
- Carsten Könneker in 2014
- Education: Washington University in St. Louis (MA); University of Cologne (Diploma in Physics)
- Board member of: University of Konstanz, Science Media Center Germany, Max Planck Institute for Astronomy

Carsten Könneker (born February 15, 1972, in Leverkusen, West Germany) is a German science journalist and science communication researcher. From 2010 to 2019, he was editor-in-chief of Spektrum der Wissenschaft, the German edition of Scientific American. From 2012 to 2018, he was professor of science communication and science studies at Karlsruhe Institute of Technology, and founding director of the German National Institute for Science Communication, Karlsruhe. From 2019 to 2022, he was one of the managing directors of the Klaus Tschira Foundation.

== Education ==
Carsten Könneker studied German literature, philosophy and art history (Master of Arts, Washington University in St. Louis, USA, 1997) and physics (Diploma, University of Cologne, Germany, 1998). From 1998 to 2000, he wrote his dissertation on the literary, aesthetic, and political-ideological reception of relativity theory and quantum mechanics during the Weimar Republic and Nazi Germany. The dissertation was supported by a scholarship from the German National Academic Foundation.

== Career ==
In 2000, Carsten Könneker became an editor at Spektrum der Wissenschaft, the German edition of Scientific American, which later became part of Springer Nature's Nature Portfolio. In this position, he played a key role in the development of the popular science magazine Gehirn & Geist, founded in 2002, which provides interdisciplinary coverage of neuroscience, psychology, artificial intelligence, and philosophy of mind, and which was later, since 2004, published in the U.S. as an adapted edition under the title Scientific American Mind. Also in 2004, Könneker became editor-in-chief of Gehirn & Geist. In 2010, he became editor-in-chief of Spektrum der Wissenschaft as well as its online platform Spektrum.de. In 2011, Könneker founded Spektrum Neo as a children's science magazine in the Spektrum portfolio. He received the Werner-und-Inge-Grüter-Prize for Science Communication for that magazine in 2012.

Also in 2012, in addition to his editorial work, Könneker was appointed full professor for science communication and science studies at Karlsruhe Institute of Technology (KIT), where he helped establish the research field Science of Science Communication at that institution. He was also the founding scientific director of the German National Institute for Science Communication in Karlsruhe, jointly funded by KIT and the Klaus Tschira Foundation.

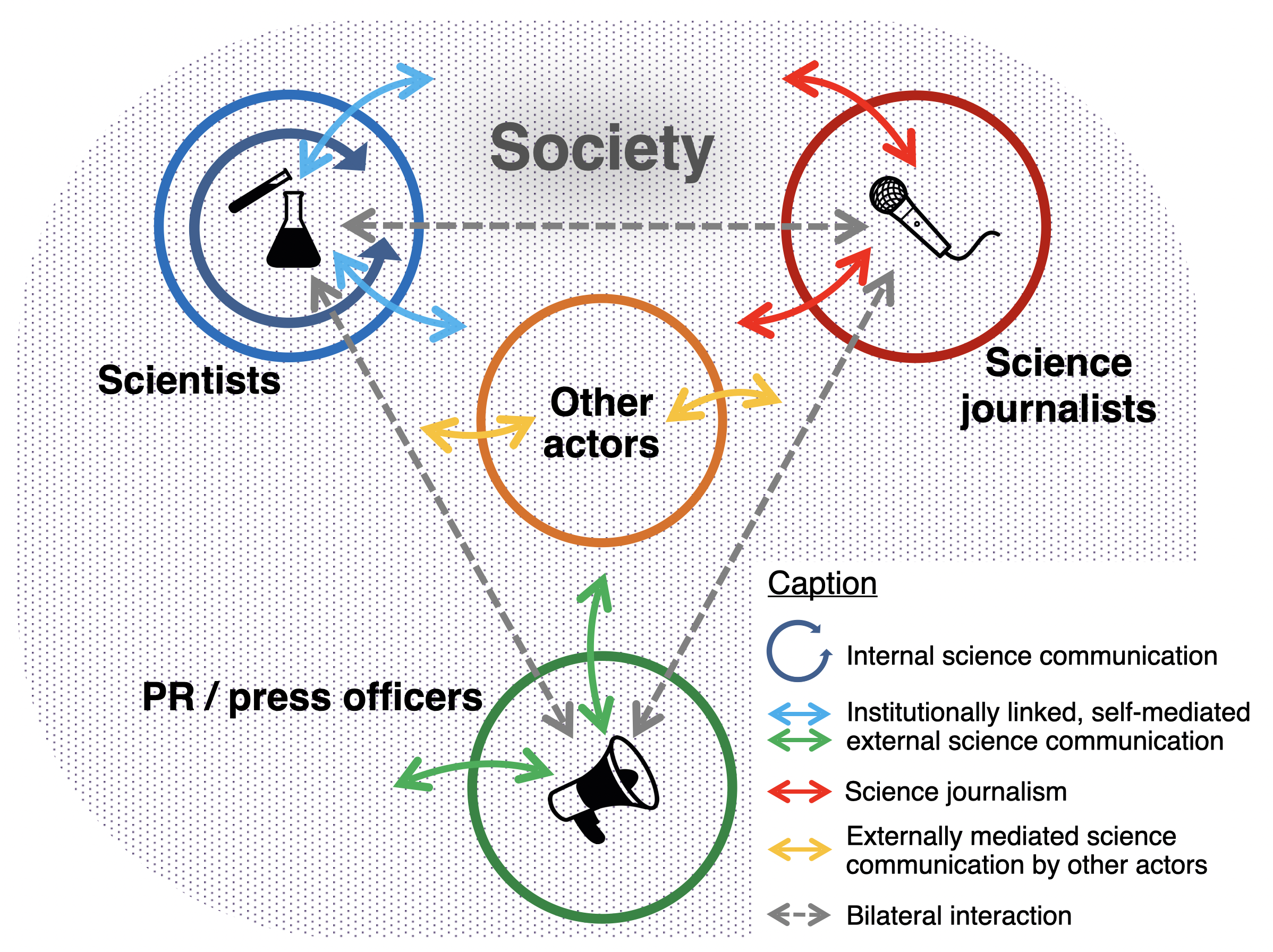
Actor model of science communication by Carsten Könneker (first published in 2016)

Könneker is the originator of the actor model of science communication, which he first published in 2016. He is also known for his examination of the effects of technological and media developments on science communication: in 2013, Könneker argued in the journal Science, that the advent of social media at that time represented an epochal development for science communication as well, as it opened up new opportunities for researchers in particular to engage in external science communication in a self-mediated way. Könneker later addressed the development and widespread availability of artificial intelligence based on large language models for science, science communication and the interest-driven shaping of public discourse. He postulated the emergence of entirely new multimodal exploitation chains for scientific content and analyzed opportunities, e.g. for more precise target group engagement and for more educational equity, but also risks due to incorrect automated information, targeted disinformation and misuse.

In 2019, Könneker became one of two managing directors of the Klaus Tschira Foundation, one of Europe's largest private foundations dedicated to science and science communication, a post he held until 2022.

== Appointments and service ==
- Max Planck Institute for Astronomy, Heidelberg, Germany: Board of Trustees (since 2020)
- Max Planck Institute for Nuclear Physics, Heidelberg, Germany: Board of Trustees (2011–2023)
- Max Planck Institute for Medical Research, Heidelberg, Germany: Board of Trustees (2018–2022)
- Max Planck Institute for Human Cognitive and Brain Sciences, Leipzig, Germany: Board of Trustees (2008–2013)
- University of Konstanz: University Council (since 2023)
- Centre for Higher Education (CHE), Gütersloh, Germany: Scientific Advisory Board (since 2013)
- Science Media Center Germany, Cologne, Germany: Supervisory Board (since 2021)
