= Martin Leiner =

German Protestant theologian (born 1960)

Martin Leiner (born 30 November 1960 in Homburg/Saar) is a German Protestant theologian and a professor for applied ethics. He holds a chair in Systematic Theology/Ethics at the Faculty of Theology at Friedrich-Schiller-Universität (FSU) Jena, Germany. He is the founder and director of the Jena Center for Reconciliation Studies (JCRS). He was president of the International Association for Reconciliation Studies (IARS) from 2020 to 2024.

== Biography ==
Leiner studied philosophy and Protestant theology at the University of Tübingen. In 1994, the Faculty of Theology at the University of Heidelberg awarded him the degree of Dr. theol., for a dissertation in New Testament on “Psychologie und Exegese. Grundfragen einer textpsychologischen Interpretation des Neuen Testaments.“ The dissertation, written under the supervision of Prof. Dr. Gerd Theißen, develops a model of interdisciplinary cooperation between the historical and literary approaches in New Testament Studies and the field of contemporary empirical psychology. In 1998 Leiner submitted his Habilitationsschrift in Systematic Theology to the Faculty of Theology at Johannes Gutenberg-Universität in Mainz, with the title „Gottes Gegenwart. Die dialogische Philosophie Martin Bubers und der Ansatz der theologischen Rezeption bei Friedrich Gogarten und Emil Brunner“. From 1998 to 2002 he was Assistant Professor and Professor for Systematic Theology and Hermeneutics at the University of Neuchâtel, in the Francophone part of Switzerland. In 2002 he was called to his current position at the FSU Jena. From 2008 to 2010 he served as the Dean of the Jena Faculty of Theology. 2000-2002 he was the President of the Institute Romand de Systématique et d´Éthique (IRSE) in Geneva, and since 2003 he is a permanent member of the Board of the Ethikzentrum at the FSU.

== Research interests ==
Three areas are especially important for his work: History of ethics, media ethics, and reconciliation studies. Since 2013, he is the Director of the Jena Center for Reconciliation Studies (JCRS), which is associated with the Faculty of Theology. The Center focuses on the theoretical foundation of trans-disciplinary and comparative studies on reconciliation, including the practical application of reconciliation models in conflict areas. Since 2009 he is the head of the International Summer School Series “Societies in Transition - Between Conflict and Reconciliation.” Currently, he leads the Trilateral Project “Hearts of Flesh Not Stone,” funded by the German Science Foundation (DFG), which received world-wide attention, when a group of Palestinian students from the West Bank, under the guidance of Prof. Mohammed Dajani, traveled to the former Nazi German Auschwitz concentration camp, German-occupied Poland (now Auschwitz-Birkenau State Museum, Oświęcim). At the same time, a group of Israeli students traveled to the West Bank and reflected on the suffering of Palestinians under Israeli occupation. In his own research, Leiner developed the “Hölderlin perspective” named after the German poet Friedrich Hölderlin (1770-1843), who wrote in his novel Hyperion that “reconciliation is in the middle of strife.” This perspective assumes that reconciliation begins not only after the end of the conflict but already during and in the conflict, although it is challenged by violence and strife or enmity. Hence, conflicts are part of real life, and the task is to transform the conflict and use it as a challenge to create a more peaceful future. In this context, Leiner is the editor of the series “Research in Peace and Reconciliation” (RIPAR) at Vandenhoeck & Ruprecht (Göttingen), which offers case studies on conflict and reconciliation from various regions and continents. Currently, 7 volumes are planned, two of which were published in 2012 and 2014.

== Selected publications ==
=== Monographs ===
- Methodischer Leitfaden systematische Theologie und Religionsphilosophie, UTB, 2008, ISBN 978-382-52315-0-7 und Vandenhoeck & Ruprecht, Göttingen 2008, ISBN 978-352-50362-4-2.
- Gottes Gegenwart: Martin Bubers Philosophie des Dialogs und der Ansatz ihrer theologischen Rezeption bei Friedrich Gogarten und Emil Brunner, Kaiser, Gütersloher Verlagshaus, Gütersloh 2000, ISBN 3-579-02666-6.
- Psychologie und Exegese: Grundfragen einer textpsychologischen Exegese des Neuen Testaments, Kaiser, Gütersloher Verlagshaus, Gütersloh 1995, ISBN 3-579-01839-6.

=== Articles ===
- „Grundfragen und Schwerpunkte einer Mediennutzerethik.“ In: Zeitschrift für Evangelische Ethik 58/4 (2014), 248–260.
- „Gesinnungsethik und Verantwortungsethik - ein Gegensatz?" In: Kein Mensch, der der Verantwortung entgehen könnte. Eds. J. Boomgarten/M. Leiner, Freiburg i. Breisgau 2014, 168–193.
- “What is Poverty? A Reflection from the Perspective of Protestant Ethics.” In: Human Dignity and Poverty. Eds. S. Tobler/A. Brate, Würzburg 2013, 85–97.
- “Tillich on God.” In: The Cambridge Companion to Paul Tillich. Ed. R. Re Manning, Cambridge 2008, 37–55.

=== Co-Editor ===
- With Iyad AlDajani: Reconciliation, Conflict Transformation, and Peace Studies, Springer 2024, ISBN 978-3-031-47838-3.
- With Francesco Ferrari/Zeina M. Barakat/Michael Sternberg/Boaz Hameiri: Encountering the Suffering of the Other. Reconciliation Studies amid the Israeli-Palestinian Conflict, Göttingen 2023, ISBN 978-3-525-56737-1.
- With Davide Tacchini/Zeina M. Barakat/Iyad AlDajani: Reconciliation and Refugees. The Academic Alliance for Reconciliation Studies in the Middle East and North Africa I, Göttingen 2022, ISBN 978-3-525-56856-9.
- With Christine Schliesser (eds): Alternative Approaches in Conflict Resolution. London 2018, ISBN 978-3319583587.
- With Maria Palme/Peggy Stöckner: Societies in Transition. Sub-Saharan Africa between Conflict and Reconciliation, Göttingen 2014 (Research In Peace And Reconciliation -RIPAR- Vol. 2), ISBN 978-3-525-56018-1.
- With Jürgen Boomgarten: Kein Mensch, der Verantwortung entgehen könnte: Verantwortungsethik in theologischer, philosophischer und religionswissenschaftlicher Perspektive, Freiburg im Breisgau 2014, ISBN 3-451-33295-7.
- With Susan Flämig: Societies in Transition. Latin America between Conflict and Reconciliation, Göttingen 2012 (Research In Peace And Reconciliation -RIPAR- Vol. 1), ISBN 3-525-56018-4.
- With Michael Trowitzsch: Karl Barths Theologie als europäisches Ereignis, Göttingen 2008, ISBN 3-525-56964-5 und ISBN 978-3-525-56964-1.
