= University of Jena =

Public university in Jena, Germany

Coordinates: 50°55′42″N 11°34′56″E

Friedrich Schiller University Jena
- Friedrich-Schiller-Universität Jena
- Latin: Universitas Litterarum Ienensis
- Type: Public
- Established: February 2, 1558; 468 years ago
- Affiliations: Coimbra Group; EUA
- Budget: €372 million
- President: Andreas Marx
- Academic staff: 3,415
- Administrative staff: 5,151
- Students: 18,219
- Location: Jena, Thuringia, Germany
- Campus: University town
- Website: www.uni-jena.de
- Location within Germany Location within Thuringia

The University of Jena, officially the Friedrich Schiller University Jena (German: Friedrich-Schiller-Universität Jena, abbreviated FSU, shortened form Uni Jena), is a public research university located in Jena, Thuringia, Germany.

The university was established in 1558 and is counted among the ten oldest universities in Germany. It is affiliated with six Nobel Prize winners, most recently in 2000 when Jena graduate Herbert Kroemer won the Nobel Prize for physics. It was renamed after the poet Friedrich Schiller who was teaching as professor of philosophy when Jena attracted some of the most influential minds at the turn of the 19th century. With Karl Leonhard Reinhold, Johann Gottlieb Fichte, G. W. F. Hegel, F. W. J. Schelling and Friedrich Schlegel on its teaching staff, the university was at the centre of the emergence of German idealism and early Romanticism.

As of 2014, the university has around 19,000 students enrolled and 375 professors. Its current president, Prof. Dr. Andreas Marx, has held the role since 2024 after his predecessor, Prof. Dr. Walter Rosenthal, became the President of the German Rectors' Conference in 2023.

== History ==
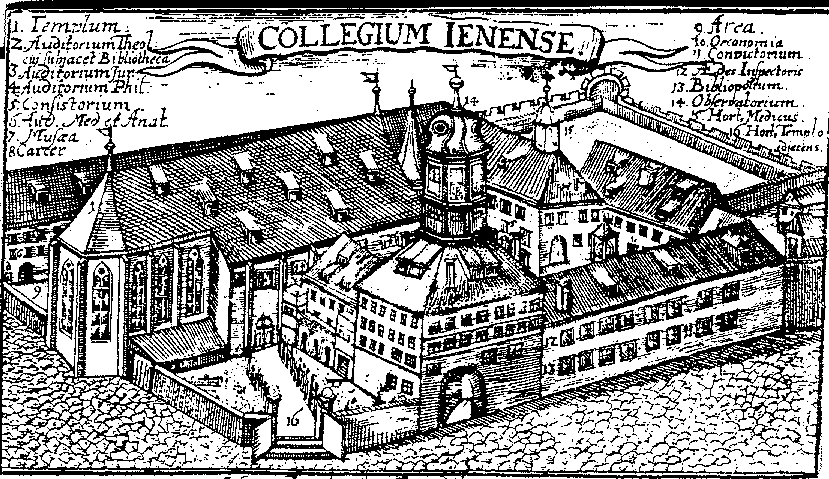
University of Jena around 1600. Jena was the center of Gnesio-Lutheran activity during the controversies leading up to the Formula of Concord.

=== Early history ===
Elector John Frederick of Saxony first thought of a plan to establish a university at Jena upon Saale in 1547 while he was being held captive by emperor Charles V. The plan was put into motion by his three sons and, after having obtained a charter from the Emperor Ferdinand I, the university was established on 2 February 1558. The university, jointly maintained by the Saxon Duchies derived from the partitioning of John Frederick's duchy, was thus named Ducal Pan-Saxon University (German: Herzoglich Sächsische Gesamtuniversität) or Salana (after the river Saale).

Prior to the 20th century, university enrollment peaked in the 18th century. The university's reputation reached its zenith under the auspices of Duke Charles Augustus, Goethe's patron (1787–1806), when Gottlieb Fichte, G. W. F. Hegel, Friedrich Schelling, Friedrich von Schlegel and Friedrich Schiller were on its teaching staff.

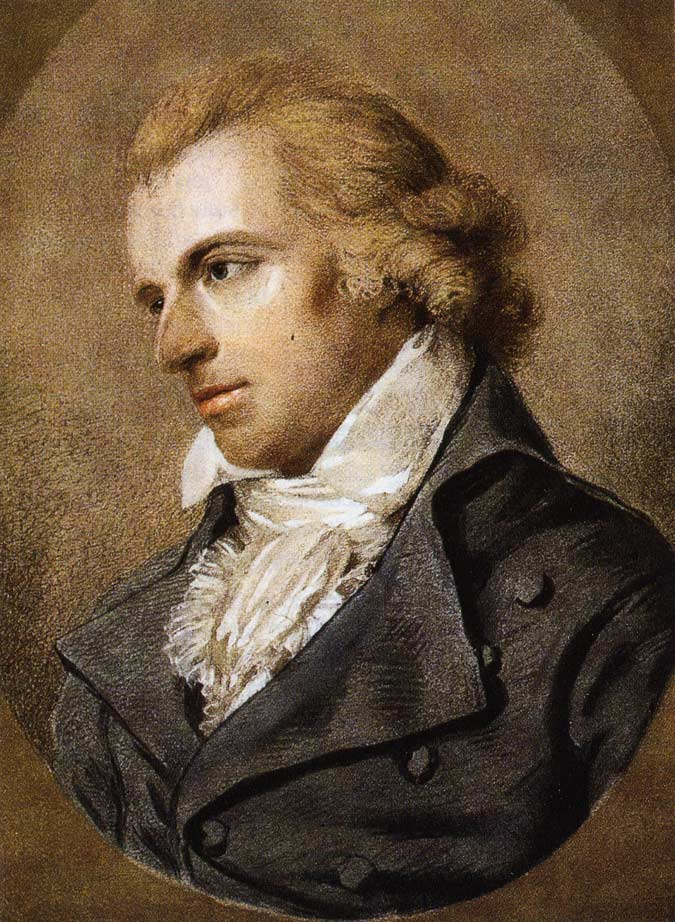
Friedrich Schiller.

Founded as a home for the new religious opinions of the sixteenth century, it has since been one of the most politically radical universities in Germany. Jena was noted among other German universities at the time for allowing students to duel and to have a passion for Freiheit, which were popularly regarded as the necessary characteristics of German student life. The University of Jena has preserved a historical detention room or Karzer with famous caricatures by Swiss painter Martin Disteli.

In the latter 19th century, the department of zoology taught evolutionary theory, with Carl Gegenbaur, Ernst Haeckel and others publishing detailed theories at the time of Darwin's "Origin of Species" (1858). The later fame of Ernst Haeckel eclipsed Darwin in some European countries, as the term "Haeckelism" was more common than Darwinism. From 1869 the physiologist and child psychologist William Thierry Preyer was another Darwinist at University of Jena.

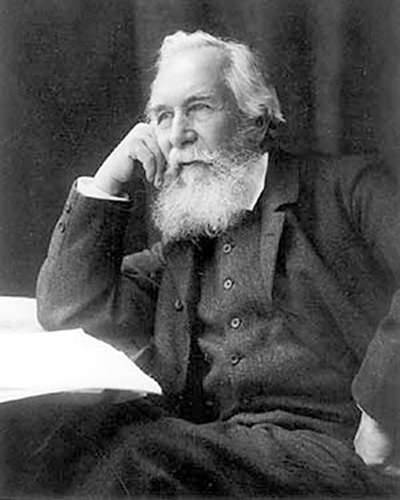
Ernst Haeckel.

In 1905, Jena had 1,100 students enrolled and its teaching staff (including Privatdozenten) numbered 112. Amongst its numerous auxiliaries then were the library, with 200,000 volumes; the observatory; the meteorological institute; the botanical garden; the seminaries of theology, philology, and education; and the well-equipped clinical, anatomical, and physical institutes.

After the end of the Saxon duchies in 1918, and their merger with further principalities into the State of Thuringia in 1920, the university was renamed as the Thuringian State University (Thüringische Landesuniversität) in 1921. In 1934 the university was renamed again, receiving its present name of Friedrich Schiller University. During the 20th century, the cooperation between Zeiss corporation and the university brought new prosperity and attention to Jena, resulting in a dramatic increase in funding and enrollment.

=== Nazi period ===
During the Third Reich, staunch Nazis moved into leading positions at the university. The racial researcher and SS-Hauptscharführer Karl Astel was appointed professor in 1933, bypassing traditional qualifications and process; he later became rector of the university in 1939. Also in 1933, many professors had to leave the university as a consequence of the Law for the Restoration of the Professional Civil Service. Student fraternities – in particular the Burschenschaften – were dissolved and incorporated into the Nazi student federation. The Nazi student federation enjoyed before the transfer of power and won great support among the student body elections in January 1933, achieving 49.3% of the vote, which represents the second best result. Between the Jena connections and the NS students wide-ranging human and ideological connections were recorded.

When the Allied air raids to Jena in February and March struck in 1945, the University Library, the university main building and several clinics in the Bachstraße received total or significant physical damage. Completely destroyed were the Botanical Garden, the psychological and the physiological institute and three chemical Institutes. An important event for the National Socialist period was the investigation of the pediatrician Yusuf Ibrahim. A Senate Commission noted the participation of the physician to the "euthanasia" murders of physically or mentally disabled children.

=== Present ===
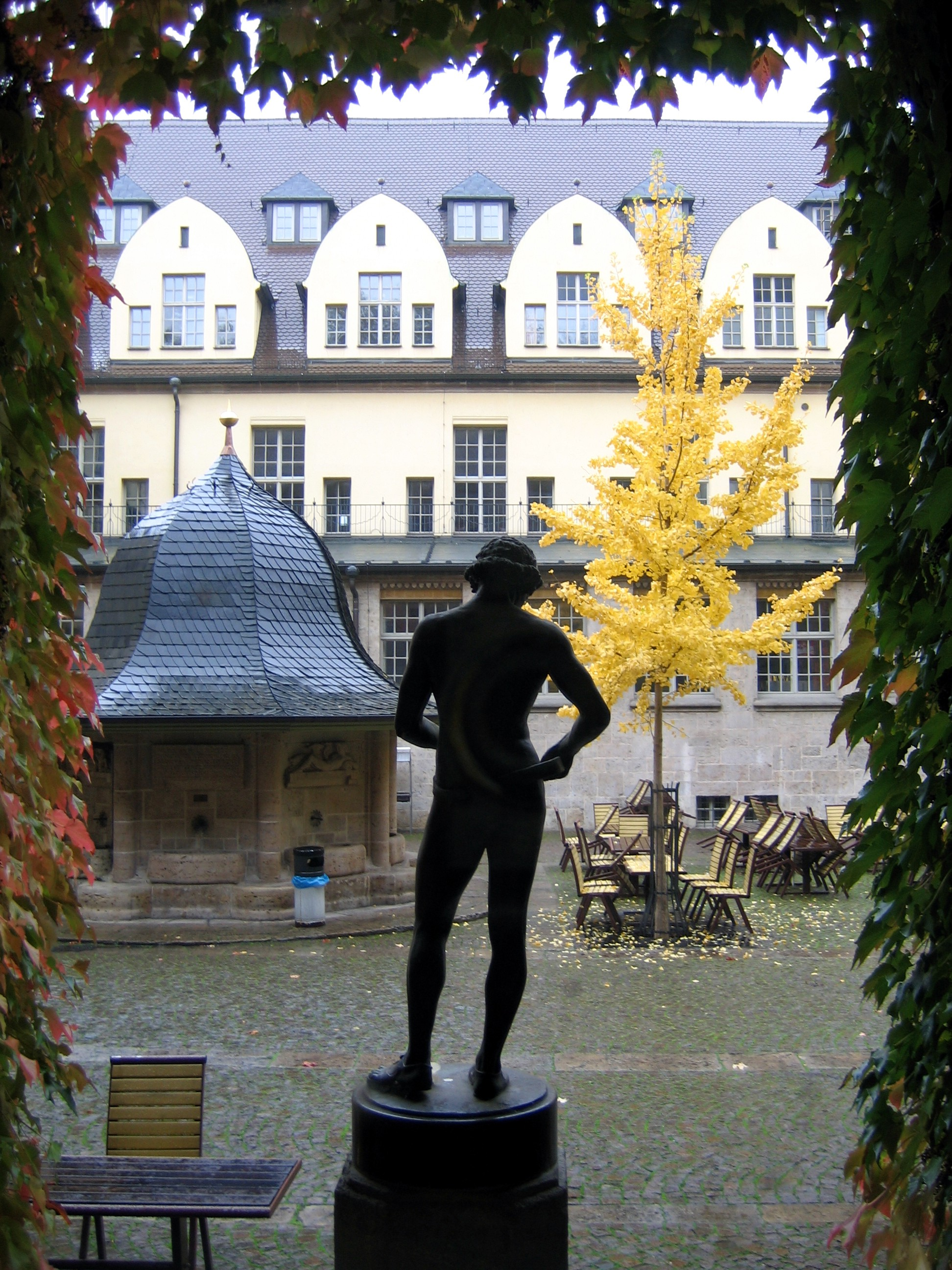
Inner courtyard with cafeteria of the Old University Building

In the 20th century the university was promoted through cooperation with Carl Zeiss (company) and thereby enabling it to increase the student population as a mass university. In 1905 the university had 1,100 students and 112 university teachers, so this figure has since been almost twenty-fold. The Friedrich-Schiller University is the only comprehensive university in Thuringia.

Since 1995, there is a university association with the Martin Luther University of Halle-Wittenberg and the University of Leipzig. The aim is firstly to give the students the opportunity to visit with relatively few problems at the partner universities and events to broaden the range of subjects and topics. Currently e. g. has joined a cooperation in teaching in the field of bioinformatics. In addition, the cooperation provides the university management the opportunity to share experiences with their regular meetings and initiate common projects. So z. B. went from the successful bid to the German Centre for Integrative Biodiversity Research (iDiv) from the university network. The co-operation continues at other levels: for example in a joint mentoring program for female postdocs or in the central German archives network. And last but not least, there are common sports activities.

Since October 2014, the pharmacologist Walter Rosenthal is the president of the university; Chancellor is since 2007 the mathematician Klaus Bartholmé.

== Organization ==
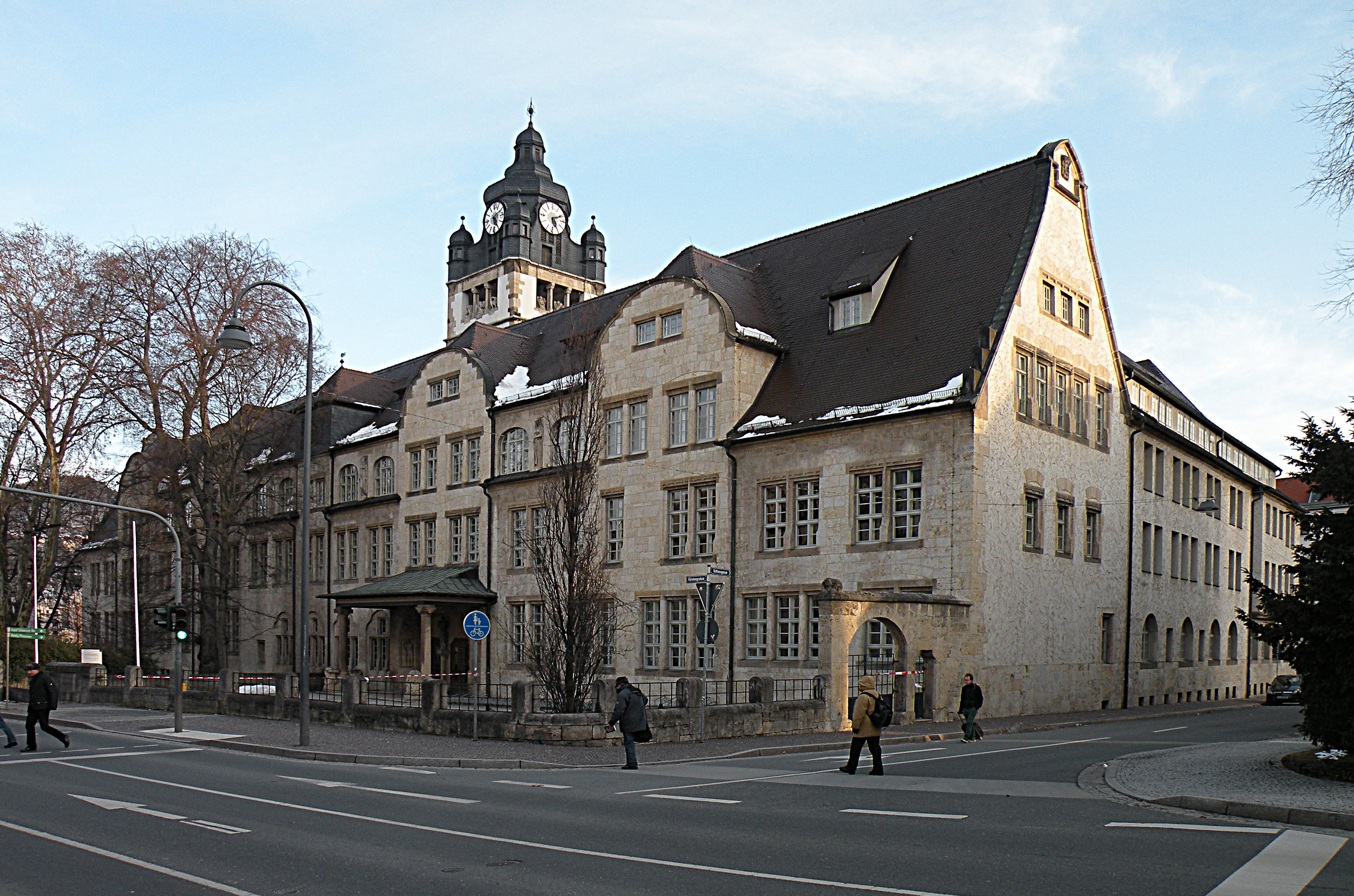
The Old University Building

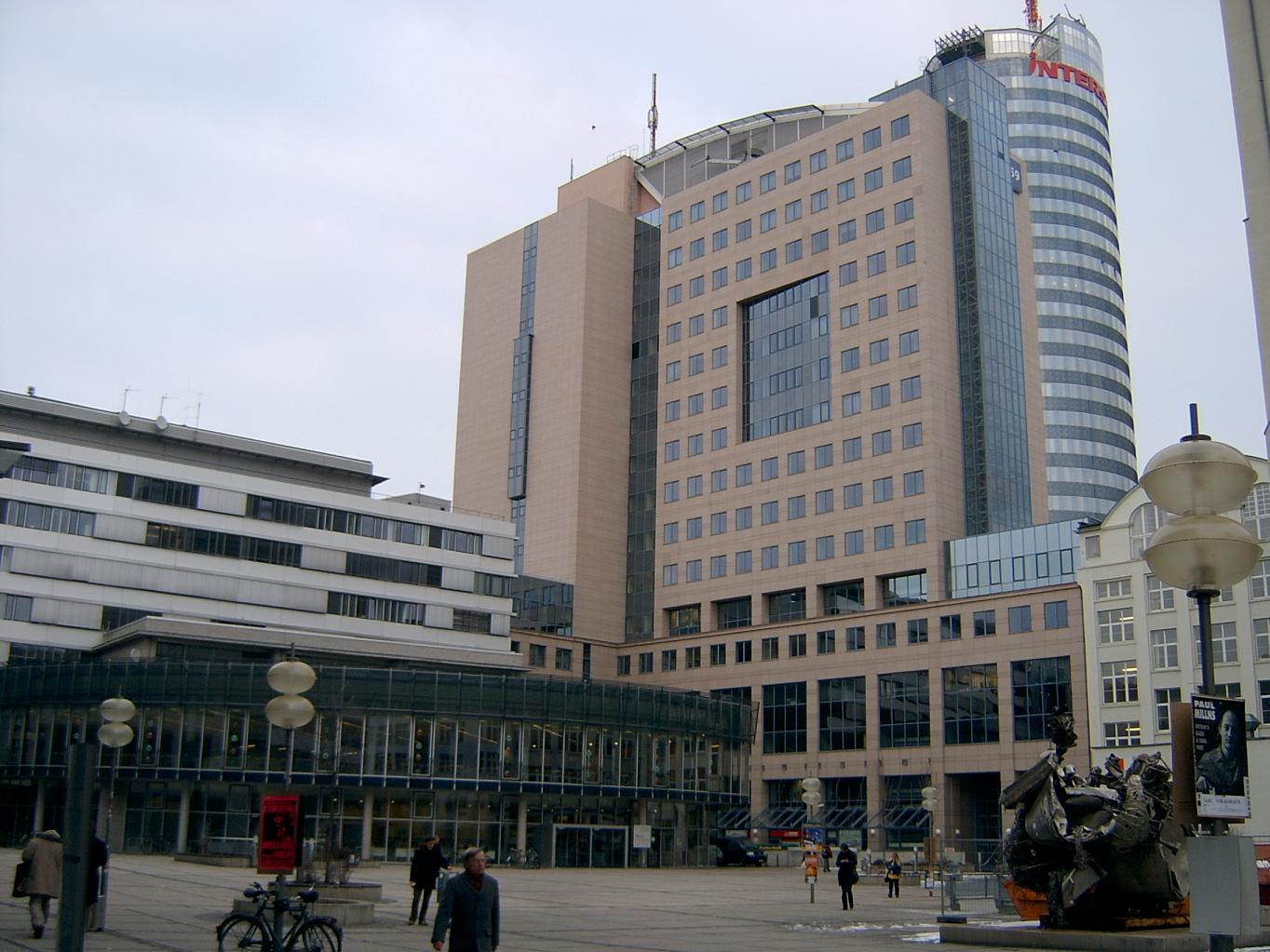
The new built Ernst-Abbe-Square

The university is organized in 10 schools:

- Theology
- Jurisprudence
- Economics and Business administration
- Humanities
- Social and Behavioural sciences
- Mathematics and Computer science
- Physics and Astronomy
- Chemical and Earth sciences
- Biology and Pharmacy
- Medicine

== Research ==
Research at Friedrich Schiller University traditionally focusses on both humanities and sciences. In addition to the faculties the following "Collaborative Research Centers" (German "Sonderforschungsbereich", short: "SFB") operate at the university:

- CRC 1076 AquaDiva : Understanding the Links Between Surface and Subsurface Biogeosphere
- CRC/TR 124 FungiNet: Pathogenic fungi and their human host: Networks of interaction
- CRC 1127 ChemBioSys: Chemical Mediators in Complex Biosystems
- CRC/TR 166 ReceptorLight: High-end light microscopy elucidates membrane receptor function
- CRC 1278 Polymer-based nanoparticle libraries for targeted anti-inflammatory strategiesde
- CRC / TR 234 CataLIGHT: Light-driven Molecular Catalysts in Hierarchically Structured Materials – Synthesis and Mechanistic Studiesde
- CRC 1375 NOA: Nonlinear Optics down to Atomic Scales

Participations in DFG-Collaborative Research Centres:

- CRC 950 Manuskriptkulturen in Asien, Afrika und Europa
- CRC/TRR 212 A Novel Synthesis of Individualisation across Behaviour, Ecology and Evolution: Niche Choice, Niche Conformance, Niche Construction

In 2006 the research center, Jena Center – History of the 20th century, was founded. In 2007 the graduate school "Jena School for Microbial Communication" (JSMC) was established within the German Universities Excellence Initiative. In 2008 the Center for Molecular Biomedicine (CMB) and the interdisciplinary research center Laboratory of the Enlightenment were developed as research institutions. 2014 the "Center of Advanced Research" (ZAF) was established.

Jena University is one of the founder of The German Centre for Integrative Biodiversity Research (iDiv) Halle-Jena-Leipzig, that was founded in 2013. It is a research centre of the German Research Foundation (DFG).

Friedrich Schiller University is the only German university with chairs for either gravitational theory or Caucasus Studies.

== Rankings ==
University rankings

Overall – Global & National
QS World 2024	461	26
THE World 2024	201–250	22–24
ARWU World 2023	401–500	25–31

The University of Jena is recognized in several university ranking systems. As per the QS World University Rankings for 2024, the university is ranked 461st in the world and 26th nationally. In the Times Higher Education World University Rankings of 2024, it is placed at 201–250th globally and 22–24th within the country. The Academic Ranking of World Universities (ARWU) for 2022 places it within the 401–500 bracket globally, and between 25th and 31st in the national context.

== Notable faculty and alumni ==
- Manuk Abeghian Armenian philologist and linguist
- Eva Ahnert-Rohlfs (doctorate in astronomy 1951)
- Lykke Aresin (1921– 2011), sexologist and writer
- Wilibald Artus (1811–80), Professor of Philosophy
- Johann Bachstrom, writer, scientist, physician and Lutheran theologian
- Ernst Gottfried Baldinger, German physician
- Hans Berger
- William Craddock Bettridge (1791-1879), soldier and clergyman
- Otto Binswanger
- Albrecht von Blumenthal taught Classical Philology as Privatdozent 1922–8
- Rudolf Brandt (1909–48), Nazi SS officer, executed for war crimes
- Werner Braune (1909–51), Nazi SS officer, executed for war crimes
- Alfred Brehm
- Clemens Brentano
- Rudolf Carnap
- Heinrich Cotta, pioneer of scientific forestry
- Georg Friedrich Creuzer
- Berthold Delbrück, linguist and syntactician
- Christoph Demmerling, philosopher and Dean of the Faculty of Arts
- Claus Dierksmeier, German philosopher
- Carl H. Dorner
- Ernst Christoph Dressler (1734–79), German composer, operatic tenor, violinist and music theorist
- Rudolf Christoph Eucken
- Johann Gottlieb Fichte
- Gottlob Frege
- Roland Freisler
- Michael Fritsch
- Johann Matthias Gesner
- Nelson Glueck
- Peter Griess
- Friedrich von Hagedorn
- Arvid Harnack
- Karl Hase
- Gerhart Hauptmann Nobel Prize-winning writer
- Georg Wilhelm Friedrich Hegel
- Cuno Hoffmeister
- Katja Hoyer
- Maximilian von Jaunez (1873–1947), industrialist and politician
- Thede Kahl
- George Kessler
- Georg Klaus
- Christian Knaut, 17th Century botanist after whom Knautia arvensis was named by Linnaeus
- Karl Korsch graduated from the University of Jena's law school summa cum laude superato, 1911
- Jan Kollár, Panslavist and poet
- Martin Leiner, chair in Systematic Theology/Ethics at the Faculty of Theology
- Li Linsi, Chinese educator and diplomat
- István Kováts
- Karl Christian Friedrich Krause
- Herbert Kroemer, Nobel Prize–winning physicist
- August Leskien
- Robert Ley
- Francis Lieber, emigrant to USA, author of "Lieber Code"
- Georg Limnaeus (Magisters der Philosophie, 1581) astronomer, mathematician, natural philosopher, corresponded with Kepler and Galileo
- Michaelis Machol, rabbi
- Margaret Schönberger Mahler (Medicine, 1922) Austrian pediatrician, psychiatrist, and psychoanalyst
- Lucas Maius
- Karl Marx (doctorate in absentia, 1841)
- Johann Jakob Müller, German moral philosopher
- Ernest Nash
- Novalis
- Ernst Ottwalt
- Axel Oxenstierna
- Henri Pittier
- Atanasie Popovici (c. 1887–1958), Serbian Romanian schoolteacher, minority rights activist and irredentist
- William Thierry Preyer
- Samuel von Pufendorf
- Gerhard von Rad
- Charng Ratanarat, Thai chemist and entrepreneur
- Werner Rolfinck
- Else Rosenfeld
- Erich Roth (1910–47), Nazi Gestapo member executed for war crimes
- Solomon Marcus Schiller-Szinessy, doctorate (Philosophy, Mathematics)
- Friedrich Wilhelm Joseph Schelling
- Katja Schenke-Layland
- Friedrich Schiller
- August Wilhelm Schlegel
- August Schleicher, German Linguist, Tree model
- Matthias Schleiden, German Botanist
- Arthur Schopenhauer (philosophy doctorate in absentia, 1813)
- Otto Schott, inventor of borosilicate glass
- Hugo Schuchardt, linguist
- Charles Sorley
- David Spence (rubber chemistry), early pioneer in rubber chemistry
- Johann Gustav Stickel, orientalist
- Michael Stifel, monk and mathematician
- Cajetan Tschink, writer and philosopher
- Kurt Tucholsky, journalist and satirist
- Erhard Weigel, mathematician, astronomer, and philosopher
- Christa Wolf, novelist and essayist
- Christian Wolff, philosopher
- Carl Zeiss, optician

== Museums and collections at the University ==
Among the collections which are open to the public are the Jena Phyletisches Museum, an institution which is unique in Europe for illustrating the history of evolution, the Ernst-Haeckel-Memorial Museum, the Mineralogical Collection which traces its roots back to Goethe and the second oldest Botanical garden of Middle Europe. The Schiller Gardenhouse (Schillers Gartenhaus) and the Goethe Memorial at the Botanical Garden are reminders of the two towering geniuses of Jena. Both buildings are also open to the public.

Oriental Collections/Papyrus Collection

- The Alphons-Stübel-Collection of Early Photographs from the Orient (1857–1890)
- Hilprecht Collection
- Orientalisches Münzkabinett (OMJ)
- Papyrus Collection

Archaeological Collections

- Collection of Ancient Art
- Collection of Plaster Casts of Ancient Sculpture
- The Photo- and Slide Collection of the Institute of Classical Archaeology
- The Collection of Prehistory and Early History
- The Bilzingsleben collection
- Department of Art History and Custodia Natural Sciences and Natural History
- The Ernst-Haeckel-Haus
- Zygomycetes (Mould Fungi)
- Didactics of Biology
- Herbarium Haussknecht (JE)
- Botanical garden
- Phyletic Museum

Mineralogy & Geology

- Mineralogical Collection
- Teaching Collection of Models for Mineralogy

History of Sciences

- Collection of scientific and technical devices for physics
- Astronomical collection

Medicine

- The Meyer Steineg Collection of Medical History in Jena
- Anatomical Collection
- Medical History
- Goethe Memorial

== See also ==
- List of early modern universities in Europe
- The Collection of Pre- and Protohistoric Artifacts at the University of Jena

== Literature ==
- Mayhew, Henry (1864): German Life and Manners as Seen in Saxony at the Present Day: With an Account of Village Life – Town Life – Fashionable Life – Domestic Life – Married Life – School and University Life, &c., of Germany at the Present Time: Illustrated with Songs and Pictures of the Student Customs at the University of Jena. In Two Volumes. London [Vol. II, Section VII, Chapter VI-XI: Student Life at Jena].
- Waldmann, Henry: „Und in Jene lebt sich’s bene“. Die Universität Jena und ihre Studenten. Hilden 2024.
- Fiedler, Fritz: Jenaer Studentenleben auf Stammbuch-Bildern des 18. Jahrhunderts (= Kleine Schriften der GDS 22). Essen: akadpress 2026.
