= Jörg Dräger =

German physicist, politician and manager

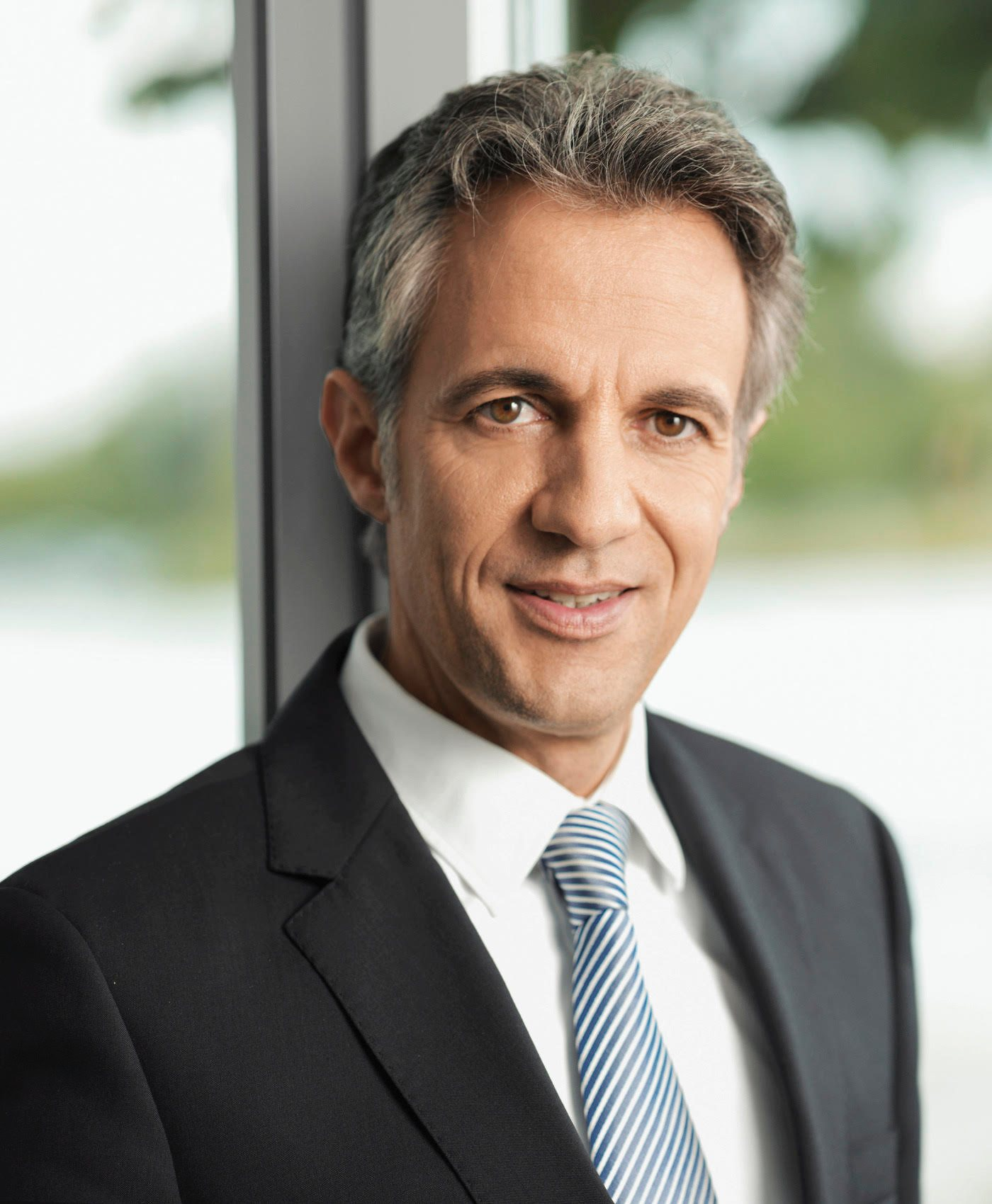
- Jörg Dräger (2017)
- Born: 1 January 1968 (age 58); Darmstadt, Hesse, West Germany (now Germany)
- Education: University of Hamburg; Cornell University
- Occupation: Executive director of the board of trustees of Kühne Foundation
- Known for: Senator in the Hamburg state government
- Website: www.joergdraeger.de

Jörg Dräger (born 1 January 1968 in Darmstadt) is a German physicist, politician and manager who has been the executive director of the board of trustees of Kühne Foundation since 2022.

From 2001 to 2008 he was a senator in the Hamburg state government. From 2008 to 2021 he has been a member of the Bertelsmann Stiftung Executive Board where he was responsible for the areas of education, integration and digitalisation. Dräger is considered a leading education expert and is the author of numerous books on education policy, including the impacts of digitization.

== Early life and education ==
Dräger completed his secondary education (Abitur) in 1987 at the Christianeum in Hamburg before doing community service in lieu of military service (Zivildienst). He then attended the University of Hamburg, studying physics with a minor in business. After receiving his undergraduate degree (Vordiplom) he transferred to Cornell University in Ithaca, New York, where he was awarded a Master of Science in theoretical physics in 1993. Three years later he received a PhD for his work in the area of mathematical crystallography. While studying and completing his doctorate he worked as a research assistant.

== Career ==
In 1996, he joined Roland Berger Strategy Consultants in Frankfurt am Main as a corporate consultant. He then returned to Hamburg in 1999 to lead the newly established Northern Institute of Technology as its CEO. The institute is one of the first public-private partnerships in the area of German higher education and is known for its interdisciplinary approach.

=== Public Office ===
In 2001, Dräger was appointed senator of science and research in Hamburg's state government led by Ole von Beust, a position he held as a political independent. He called for the introduction of tuition fees and more competition among higher education institutions to secure the institutions' long-term funding. These recommendations were greeted with criticism, especially by student representatives.

After early elections in 2004, Dräger was appointed senator of science and health in the second von Beust government. Continuing to advocate for reform, he succeeded in introducing tuition fees. His goal was a fundamental reform of Hamburg's university system. He promoted the establishment of new institutions and the consolidation of existing ones as a way of modernizing Hamburg's higher education structures and making them more flexible. In retrospect these measures have proven controversial: While supporters praised his expertise and determination, critics opposed cutbacks made in the humanities, among other changes. In 2008, Dräger placed last in the ranking of ministers published by the German Association of University Professors and Lecturers; one year later he again placed sixth.

In 2006, he turned over his responsibilities in the area of health to Senator Birgit Schnieber-Jastram. Following elections in 2008 he announced that he would not serve another term. His announcement was met with regret by a number of public figures, including former Hamburg Mayor Klaus von Dohnanyi, who wrote in a commentary in the Hamburger Abendblatt newspaper that the city had lost presumably its "most effective science senator since 1945." Other members of the media, conversely, were relieved that the "bulldozer in the three-piece suit" (taz) was leaving politics.

=== Bertelsmann Stiftung ===
From 2008 until the end of 2021, Dräger was a member of the Bertelsmann Stiftung Executive Board, where he was responsible for education, integration and digitalisation. In addition, he joined Frank Ziegele as a co-executive director of the nonprofit CHE Centre for Higher Education. In both positions Dräger has advocated for a number of reforms, including more autonomous colleges and universities. He has called for providing schools in troubled neighborhoods with better equipment and resources, and ensuring that educational systems in rural areas adapt to reflect demographic change. He is in favor of all-day schools and views digital media as a helpful tool for improving education.

Dräger was the deputy chair of the Board of Trustees of the Expert Council of the German Foundations on Integration and Migration. He has called for increased immigration from non-EU countries to ensure Germany does not lose out in the international competition for skilled workers.

Dräger advises young entrepreneurs at the nonprofit Founders Foundation and teaches public management at the Hertie School of Governance.

== Other activities ==
- Jacobs University Bremen, Member of the Board of Governors (since 2018)

== Personal life ==
Dräger is married and has two children.

== Publications ==
- Jörg Dräger; Robert H. Silsbee (1997). Simulations for Solid State Physics. An Interactive Resource for Students and Teachers. Cambridge: Cambridge University Press. ISBN 978-0-521-59094-5.
- Jörg Dräger (2011). Dichter, Denker, Schulversager: Gute Schulen sind machbar – Wege aus der Bildungskrise (in German). Munich: Deutsche Verlags-Anstalt. ISBN 978-3-421-04529-4.
- Jörg Dräger; Christina Tillmann; Frank Frick (2014). Wie politische Ideen Wirklichkeit werden – Ein Lehr- und Praxisbuch (in German). Baden-Baden: Nomos Verlag. ISBN 978-3-8487-1613-5.
- Jörg Dräger; Ralph Müller-Eiselt (2015). Die digitale Bildungsrevolution: Der radikale Wandel des Lernens und wie wir ihn gestalten können (in German). Munich: Deutsche Verlags-Anstalt. ISBN 978-3-421-04709-0.
- Jörg Dräger; Ralph Müller-Eiselt (2019). Wir und die intelligenten Maschinen: Wie Algorithmen unser Leben bestimmen und wir sie für uns nutzen können (in German). Munich: Deutsche Verlags-Anstalt. ISBN 978-3-641-24089-9.
