= Jeannie Vanasco =

American writer

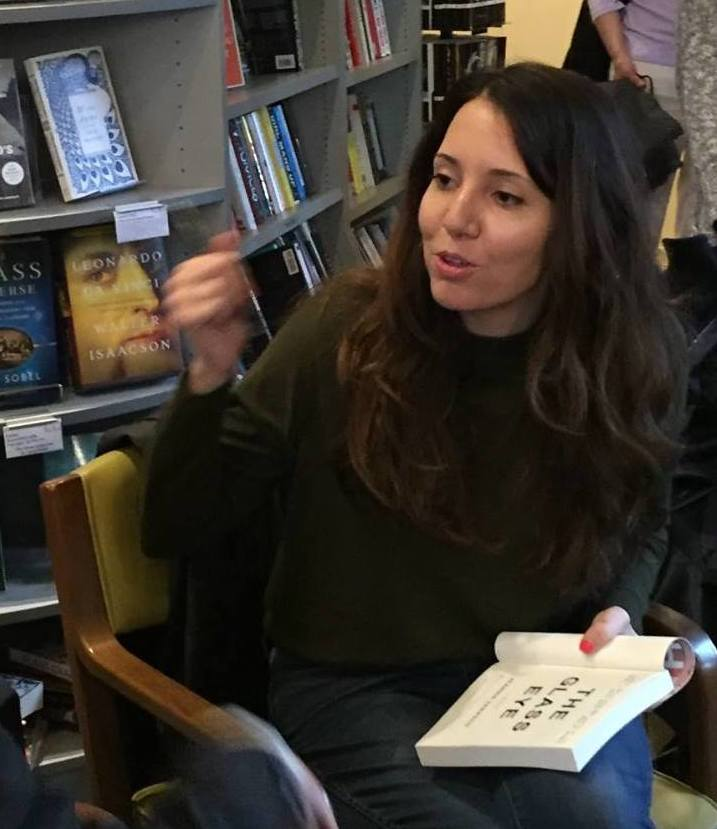
Author Jeannie Vanasco signs copies of her debut memoir in Baltimore (2017).

Jeannie Vanasco is an American writer. She is the author of A Silent Treatment, a memoir about her mother's repeated use of the silent treatment, Things We Didn't Talk About When I Was a Girl, a memoir about her former friendship with the man who raped her, and The Glass Eye, a memoir about her father and his deceased daughter, Vanasco's namesake. She teaches English at Towson University.

== Early life and education ==
Raised in Sandusky, Ohio, Vanasco described her childhood as idyllic. While at Sandusky High School, she edited the school newspaper and then studied creative writing at Northwestern University where she received the Jean Meyer Aloe Poetry Prize from the Academy of American Poets. She earned her MFA in poetry from New York University and her MFA in memoir from Hunter College.

== Career ==
After graduating from Northwestern University in 2006, Vanasco moved to New York City to intern for The Paris Review. She later became an assistant editor at Lapham's Quarterly. Between 2006 and 2011, she contributed reviews to the Times Literary Supplement, and in 2011 she began blogging for The New Yorker. In 2017 she published her first memoir, The Glass Eye, which Poets & Writers named one of the five best literary nonfiction debuts of the year, and which the American Booksellers Association selected for its Indie Next and Indies Introduce programs.

In 2019, she published her second memoir, Things We Didn't Talk About When I Was a Girl, which Amazon named one of the twenty best books of the year. An editor for the Amazon Book Review said that Vanasco's second memoir "adds a different dimension to the #MeToo conversation—one more intimate, insidious, and full of improbable grace." Writing for Time, Laurie Halse Anderson called Things We Didn't Talk About When I Was a Girl "bold, unsettling, timely."

In 2025, she published her third memoir, A Silent Treatment, which Booklist in its starred review described as "A beautiful gift to all who have struggled to care for a loved one in the way they needed."

Vanasco is an associate professor of English at Towson University where she teaches creative writing.

== Publications ==
=== Essays ===
- "The Truth About Cats and Daughters" (January 2023, The New York Times Magazine)
- "My Platonic Romance on the Psych Ward" (September 2017, The New York Times Modern Love column)
- "What's in a Necronym?" (July 2015, The Believer)
- "The Glass Eye" (June 2015, The Believer)
- "Absent Things As if They Are Present" (January 2012, The Believer)

=== Books ===
- A Silent Treatment, (2025) Portland, Oregon: Tin House Books, ISBN 978-1-96310-845-3
- Things We Didn't Talk About When I Was a Girl, (2019) Portland, Oregon: Tin House Books, ISBN 978-1-94779-354-5
- The Glass Eye, (2017) Portland, Oregon: Tin House Books, ISBN 978-1-94104-077-5
