= Pirmin Stekeler-Weithofer =

German philosopher (born 1952)

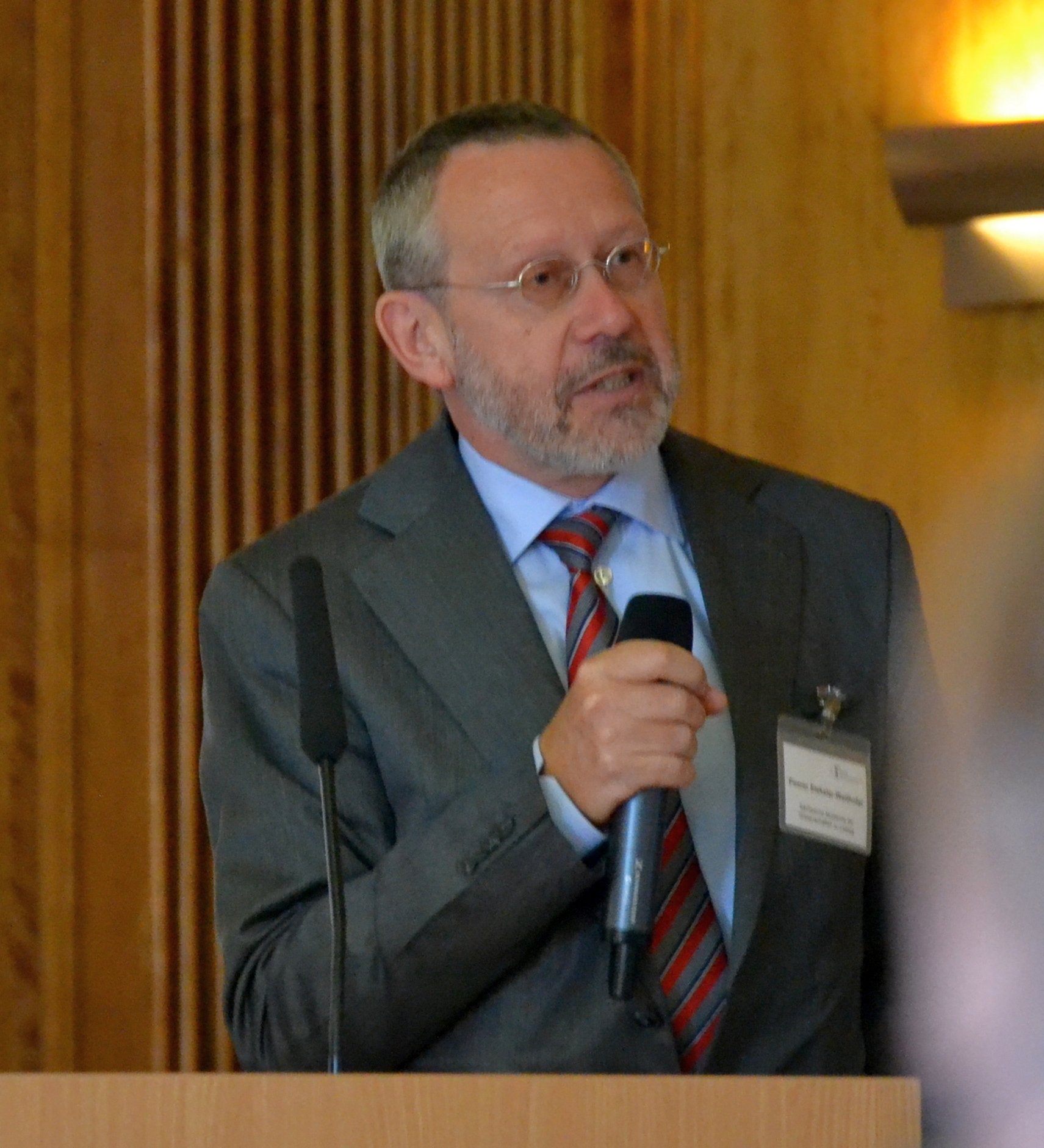
Pirmin Stekeler-Weithofer (2015)

Pirmin Stekeler-Weithofer (born 21 December 1952 in Meßkirch) is a German philosopher and professor of theoretical philosophy at the University of Leipzig. He was the president of the International Ludwig Wittgenstein Society (2006–09) and is now a vice president of this institution.

== Philosophy ==
The philosopher studied mathematics and philosophy in Berkeley, Konstanz, Berlin, Prague and teaches theoretical philosophy at the University of Leipzig.

Stekeler-Weithofer contributes to the philosophy of language, action theory, logic and the relationships between classical and analytical philosophy. An important point is the philosophy of Hegel.

== Books ==
- Grundprobleme der Logik. Elemente einer Kritik der formalen Vernunft. Berlin 1986, ISBN 3-11-010491-1.
- Hegels Analytische Philosophie. Die Wissenschaft der Logik als kritische Theorie der Bedeutung. Paderborn 1992, ISBN 3-506-78750-0.
- Sinn-Kriterien. Die logischen Grundlagen kritischer Philosophie von Platon bis Wittgenstein. Paderborn 1995, ISBN 3-506-78749-7.
- Was heißt Denken? Von Heidegger über Hölderlin zu Derrida. Bonn University Press, Bonn 2004, ISBN 3-86529-002-7.
- Philosophie des Selbstbewußtseins. Hegels System als Formanalyse von Wissen und Autonomie. Suhrkamp (stw 1749), Frankfurt/M. 2005, ISBN 3-518-29349-4.
- (together with Friedrich Kambartel) Sprachphilosophie. Probleme und Methoden. Reclam, Stuttgart 2005, ISBN 3-15-018380-4.
- Philosophiegeschichte. de Gruyter 2006, ISBN 3-11-018556-3
- Formen der Anschauung. Eine Philosophie der Mathematik. de Gruyter 2008, ISBN 978-3-11-019435-7.
- Sinn (Grundthemen Philosophie) de Gruyter, Berlin/Boston 2011, ISBN 978-3110254150.
- Denkströme. Journal der Sächsischen Akademie der Wissenschaften. Im Auftrag der Sächsischen Akademie der Wissenschaften zu Leipzig herausgegeben von Pirmin Stekeler-Weithofer. Leipziger Universitätsverlag, ISSN (Druck): 1867–6413; ISSN (Online): 1867–7061, Onlineausgabe: www.denkstroeme.de.
- Denken. Wege und Abwege in der Philosophie des Geistes (Philosophische Untersuchungen 28), Mohr Siebeck, Tübingen 2012, ISBN 978-3-16-151935-2.
- Hegels Phänomenologie des Geistes. Ein dialogischer Kommentar: Band 1: Gewissheit und Vernunft. Band 2: Geist und Religion, Meiner, Hamburg 2014, ISBN 978-3-7873-2729-4
- Manuscript Hegel's Analytic Pragmatism
