= Magdeburg-Stendal University of Applied Sciences =

Public university in Germany

- Hochschule Magdeburg-Stendal
- Motto: Studieren im Grünen
- Motto in English: Study in the greenery
- Type: Public
- Established: 1991
- Affiliations: EUA, DFN, GRC
- Chancellor: Nora Küster-Dammaschke
- Rector: Susanne Borkowski
- Academic staff: 126
- Administrative staff: 373
- Students: 5,500 - 21/22
- Location: Magdeburg and Stendal, Saxony-Anhalt, Germany; 52.141499°N 11.677004°E
- Colours: Blue
- Website: www.h2.de

The Magdeburg-Stendal University of Applied Sciences is a public university of applied sciences with two campuses. One campus is located in Magdeburg, the capital city of Saxony-Anhalt, and the other is located in Stendal.

The university's research focuses are on engineering, water- and waste management and early childhood education.

== History ==
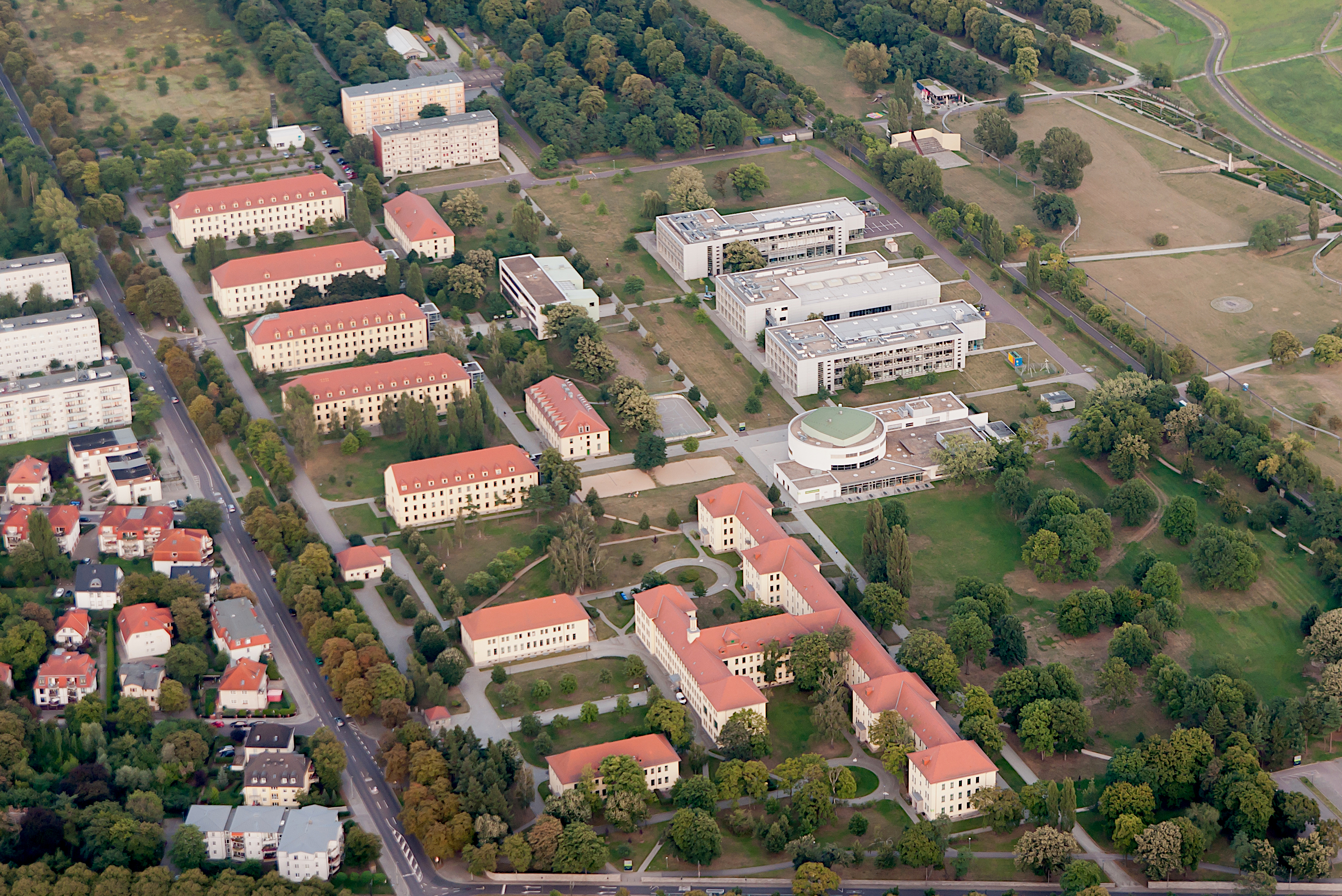
Aerial view of the university's campus in Magdeburg

The university was founded in 1991. There are approximately 50 study programmes at three faculties in Magdeburg and two faculties in Stendal. There are around 3,700 students in Magdeburg and 1,800 in Stendal.

== Academic degrees ==
The university offers German and English study paths leading to academic degrees such as B.A., B.Sc., M.A., M.Sc. and doctoral degrees.
