= Katja Schenke-Layland =

Professor of Biomedical Technologies

- Born: Katja Schenke; 21 March 1977 (age 49); Eisenach, Germany
- Education: University of Jena; Children's Hospital Los Angeles; University of California, Los Angeles
- Occupations: Professor; Institute Director; CEO
- Website: schenke-layland-lab.com

Katja Schenke-Layland (born Eisenach, Germany, March 21, 1977) is the Vice-President for Research, Innovation and Transfer at the University of Tübingen and the Professor of Medical Technologies and Regenerative Medicine, Institute of Biomedical Engineering, Department for Medical Technologies and Regenerative Medicine. She is the Director of the NMI Natural and Medical Sciences Institute at the University Tübingen in Reutlingen and former study Dean of Medical Technologies at the University of Tübingen. She was the Founding Director of the Institute of Biomedical Engineering at the Medical Faculty of the University Tübingen and the Founding Director of the 3R Center for In Vitro Models and Alternatives to Animal Testing Tübingen.

== Early research ==
Katja Schenke-Layland began her doctoral work in the area of heart valve tissue engineering and non-invasive imaging at the University of Jena, Germany. Her specific interest was the effect of cryopreservation, decellularization/recellularization and biomechanical forces on heart valve extracellular matrix (ECM) structures and cells. She helped develop the use of multiphoton laser-based confocal microscopy and second harmonic generation as non-invasive tissue imaging tools. For her post-doctoral work, she focused on cardiac stem cell biology and biomaterials. Here, her seminal work was to be the first scientist to demonstrate that induced pluripotent stem cells (iPSCs) differentiate towards the cardiovascular and hematopoietic lineages, showing that beating cardiomyocytes could be derived from iPSCs. She then returned to Germany to join the Fraunhofer IGB in Stuttgart, Germany as a group leader, which was then followed by her appointment as Professor in the Medical Faculty of the University of Tübingen, and promotion to Department Head and later Director of the Fraunhofer IGB. She remained focused on cardiovascular development and biomaterials, and moved into the areas of in vitro test systems and Raman microspectroscopy, with a focus on ECM proteins.

== Awards ==
- Best Young Researcher Award/ Family Klee Prize, German Society for Biomedical Engineering
- Young Investigator Morphological Sciences Award, American Association of Anatomists
- Academia.net top female scientists in Germany
- Tissue Engineering and Regenerative Medicine International Society (TERMIS)-EU Young Investigator Award
- CyberOne Business Plan Competition Finalist
- RPB Harold F. Spalter International Scholar Award
- Germany's Top 100 Innovators
- German Stem Cell Network GSCN 2021 Hilde Mangold Award

== Research focus ==
Currently, her research lab at the University Tübingen focuses on the translation of human development into clinically relevant biomaterials and regenerative therapies, and the development of diagnostic tools to assess (stem) cell states, discover therapeutic candidates and diagnose diseases. She leverages her appointments to bridge the gaps between science and industry to drive viable health care solutions, particularly at the NMI where they focus on supporting local SMEs

== Editorial work ==
Katja Schenke-Layland is currently the Co-Editor-In-Chief of Tissue Engineering Part B (Mary Ann Liebert) and Executive Editor of Advanced Drug Delivery Reviews (Elsevier), as well as on the editorial boards of Matrix Biology (journal) (Elsevier), Current Opinion in Biomedical Engineering (Elsevier), Journal of 3D Printing in Medicine (Future Medicine) and Scientific Reports (Nature Research). She is a fellow/ board member of the German National Academy of Science and Engineering, German Central Ethics Committee for Stem Cell Research, International and German Societies of Matrix Biology and the European Alliance for Medical and Biological Engineering and Science.
