= William Craddock Bettridge =

William Craddock Bettridge (August 30, 1791 – November 21, 1879) was a soldier and clergyman with the Church of England.

Bettridge's first career was with the military as an ensign in the 81st foot. He saw active service in the Low Countries and attained the rank of a lieutenant, retiring on half-pay in 1816. He then attended the University of Jena and, after graduation, was privately employed as a soldier and an aide.

In 1824, William Bettridge began his church career and served in various capacities. In 1834 he came to Upper Canada as a missionary. He accompanied Admiral Henry Vansittart who was founding the town of Woodstock. He became rector of this parish in 1836 and continued so through his career.
