= Bernd Giese =

German chemist (born 1940)

Bernd Giese (born 2 June 1940 in Hamburg, Germany) is a German chemist and guest professor in chemistry at the University of Fribourg in Fribourg, Switzerland since 2010.

== Biography ==
Born in Hamburg, Germany, Giese received his PhD from LMU Munich under Rolf Huisgen in 1969. (Note: Title of the dissertation: Beiträge zum Mechanismus der Amin-Addition an Acetylen-Carbonester OCLC 62794433) From 1969 to 1971, he worked in pharmaceutical research at BASF in Ludwigshafen. He obtained his Habilitation from the University of Freiburg in 1976. From 1977 to 1988, he was full professor at the Technical University of Darmstadt and from 1989 to 2010 at the University of Basel.

== Research ==
Giese specializes in the bio-organic chemistry and synthesis of radicals in biological systems. He contributed to the understanding of radical induced DNA cleavage and of the DNA synthesis by ribonucleotide reductase. He discovered that long range charge transfer through DNA and Peptides occurs by a hopping mechanism. The formation of carbon–carbon bonds by addition of free radicals to alkenes is called the Giese reaction. Giese developed concepts, guidelines, and synthetic applications for the stereochemistry of radical reactions.

== Awards ==
- 1976 Karl-Winnacker Award
- 1977 Carl-Duisberg Award
- 1987 Gottfried Wilhelm Leibniz Prize
- 1988 Merck-Schuchardt Award
- 1999 Member of the German National Academy of Sciences Leopoldina
- 2003 Foreign Honorary Member of the American Academy of Arts and Sciences
- 2005 Tetrahedron Prize for Creativity in Organic Chemistry & BioMedicinal Chemistry
- 2006 Emil Fischer Medal of the Gesellschaft Deutscher Chemiker
- 2009 Norris Award in Physical Organic Chemistry of the American Chemical Society
- 2012 Paracelsus Prize of the Swiss Chemical Society

Reuters News agency predicted him as a possible Nobel Laureate in Chemistry in 2009.
