= Christoph Demmerling =

German philosopher

- Born: 17 August 1963 (age 63); Olpe, Westphalia, West Germany

Education
- Education: University of Konstanz

Philosophical work
- Era: Contemporary philosophy
- Region: Western philosophy
- School: Continental philosophy, Critical theory, Analytic philosophy
- Institutions: University of Jena, University of Marburg
- Main interests: Philosophy of language, Philosophy of emotions, Philosophical anthropology, Ethics
- Notable ideas: Language-philosophical revision of Critical theory

Christoph Demmerling (born 17 August 1963) is a German philosopher, Professor of Theoretical Philosophy and former Dean of the Faculty of Arts at the University of Jena. His work spans the philosophy of language, philosophy of emotions, philosophical anthropology, and the theoretical foundations of practical philosophy.

== Education and career ==
Demmerling studied philosophy at the University of Konstanz between 1983 and 1988, with minors in modern German literature and theoretical linguistics. After completing his master's degree, he was a doctoral fellow of the German Academic Scholarship Foundation from 1990. Following a research stay at the University of Florence from 1991 to 1992, he received his PhD from the University of Konstanz in 1992.

From 1992 to 1998, Demmerling worked as a research assistant at the Chair of Practical Philosophy and Ethics at TU Dresden. After completing his habilitation there, he served as a senior assistant from 1998 to 2003. He held guest professorships at the Free University of Berlin, Goethe University Frankfurt, the University of Giessen, Leipzig University, and the University of Osnabrück. He was appointed Full Professor of Philosophy at the University of Marburg in 2008. He held the position until 2015, when he accepted the chair in theoretical philosophy at the University of Jena.

== Philosophical work ==
Demmerling's work is characterized by an engagement with Ludwig Wittgenstein, phenomenology, and Critical Theory. His first monograph on language and reification develops a revision of Critical Theory by bringing Wittgenstein's critique of language into dialogue with Adorno's theory of non-identity, while drawing on Marxian conceptions of praxis. His linguistic-theoretical alternative to contemporary theories of reification is juxtaposed with Axel Honneth's recognition-based approach.

Demmerling proposes an alternative to Jürgen Habermas’s theory of communicative action by treating language as a constitutive social practice. He has engaged directly with Habermas on the justification of validity claims in speech acts. Academic reviews describe Demmerling's work as an intervention reopening the approach of the early Frankfurt School to revision through analytic philosophy. As Jan Plamper notes, Demmerling's work on emotions expounds the transition from pre-Socratic views of feelings as external forces to modern internalized interpretations.

In the philosophy of language, he has argued for approaches that integrate anthropological dimensions and attend to the practical and performative aspects of linguistic articulation. In Concepts in Thought, Action, and Emotion (2021), Demmerling and Dirk Schröder examine competing views that understand concepts as abstract entities, mental representations, or practical abilities.

Demmerling is a co-editor of the Deutsche Zeitschrift für Philosophie, a bimonthly German philosophy journal.

== Selected works ==
=== Monographs ===
- Sprache und Verdinglichung. Wittgenstein, Adorno und das Projekt einer kritischen Theorie. Suhrkamp, 1994.
- Grundprobleme der analytischen Sprachphilosophie. Von Frege zu Dummett (with Thomas Blume). UTB/Schöningh, 1998.
- Sinn, Bedeutung, Verstehen. Untersuchungen zu Sprachphilosophie und Hermeneutik. mentis, 2002.
- Philosophie der Gefühle. Von Achtung bis Zorn (with Hilge Landweer). Metzler, 2007.

=== Edited volumes ===
- Vernunftkritik nach Hegel (with Friedrich Kambartel). Suhrkamp, 1992.
- Wahrheit, Wissen und Erkenntnis in der Literatur (with Ingrid Vendrell Ferran). De Gruyter, 2014.
- Concepts in Thought, Action, and Emotion. New Essays (with Dirk Schröder). Routledge, 2021.
- Wittgenstein and Marx on Language, Mind and Society (with Pietro Garofalo and Felice Cimatti). Mimesis International, 2022.
