= Sandusky City School District =

School district in Ohio, United States

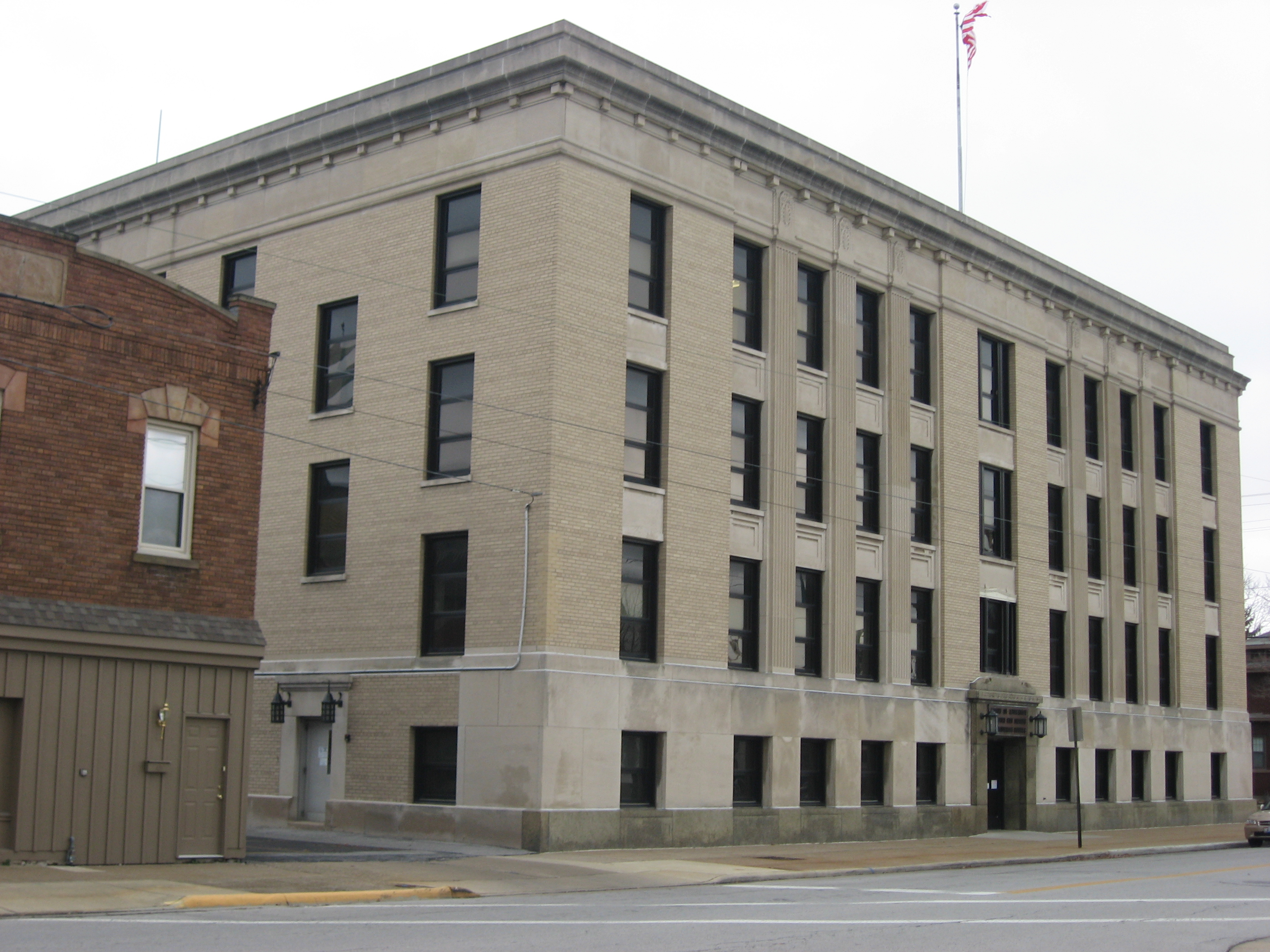
- District offices, located in a former Hinde & Dauch Paper Company factory.

Address
- 407 Decatur Street Sandusky, Ohio, 44870; United States

District information
- Type: Public
- Grades: PK–12
- Schools: 5
- NCES District ID: 3904474

Students and staff
- Students: 3,105 (2024–2025)
- Teachers: 191.80 (on an FTE basis) (2024–2025)
- Staff: 364.73 (on an FTE basis) (2024–2025)
- Student–teacher ratio: 16.19 (2024–2025)

Other information
- Website: www.scs-k12.net

Sandusky City School District is a public school district serving students in the city of Sandusky, Ohio, United States. The school district enrolls 3,449 students as of the 2012–2013 academic year.

== Schools ==
=== Preschools ===
Hancock Elementary (Preschool) Mills Elementary (Preschool)

=== Elementary schools ===
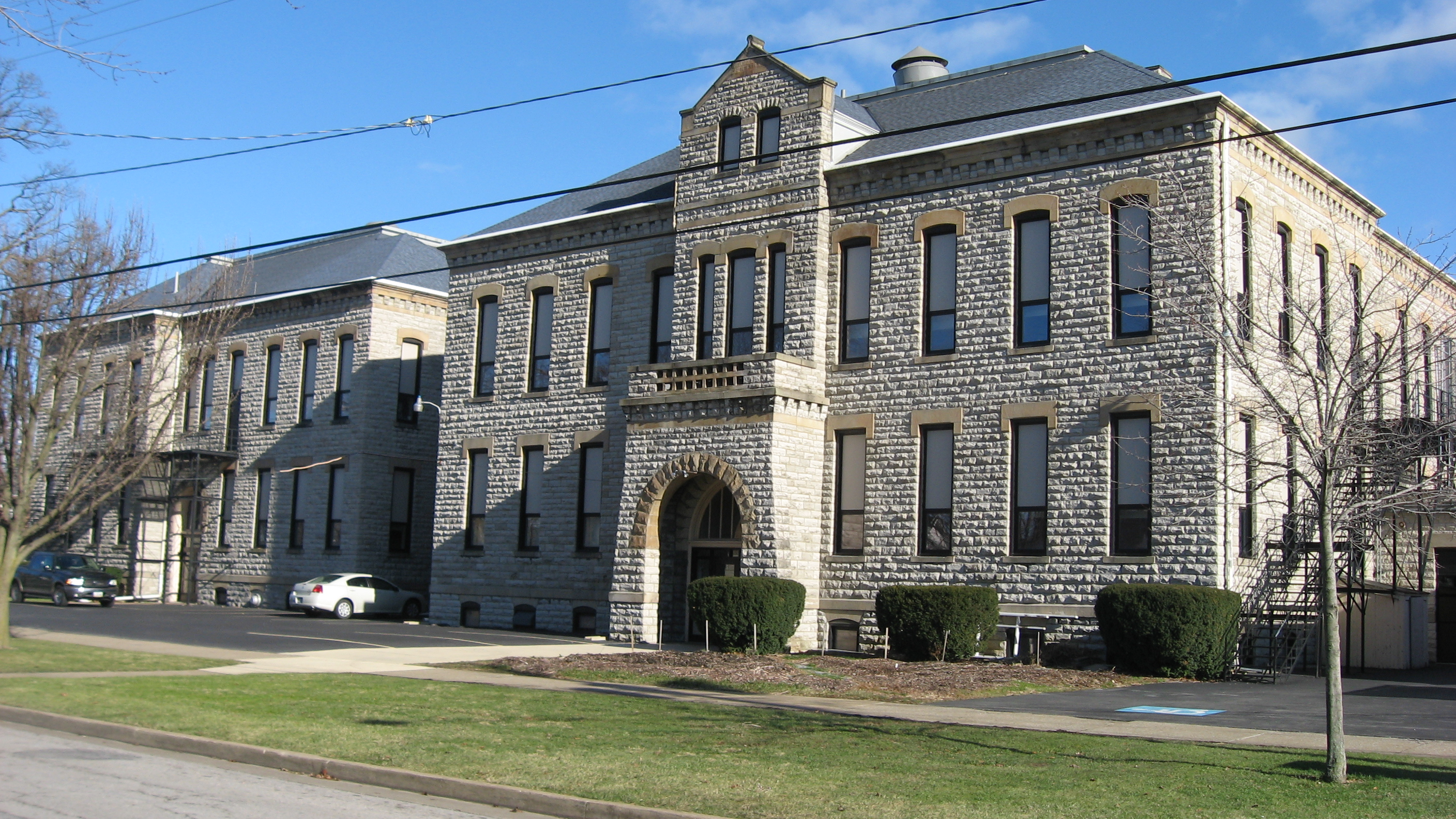
Osborne Elementary

- Hancock Elementary School (Grades K through 6th)
- Mills Elementary School (Built 1953) (Grades K through 6th)
- Ontario Elementary School (Grades K through 6th)
- Osborne Elementary School (Grades K through 6th)
- Venice Heights Elementary School (Grades K through 6th)
- Regional Center for Advanced Academic Studies, RCAAS (Grades 3–6)
- Sandusky Intermediate School (Grades 3–6)

=== Middle schools ===
Sandusky Middle School (Grades 7-8th)

=== High Schools ===
Sandusky High School serves Grades 9th through 12th. It offers vocational programs for students. It also offer college credit courses in partnership with BGSU Firelands, in nearby Huron, Ohio.
