= Walter Rosenthal =

German pharmacologist

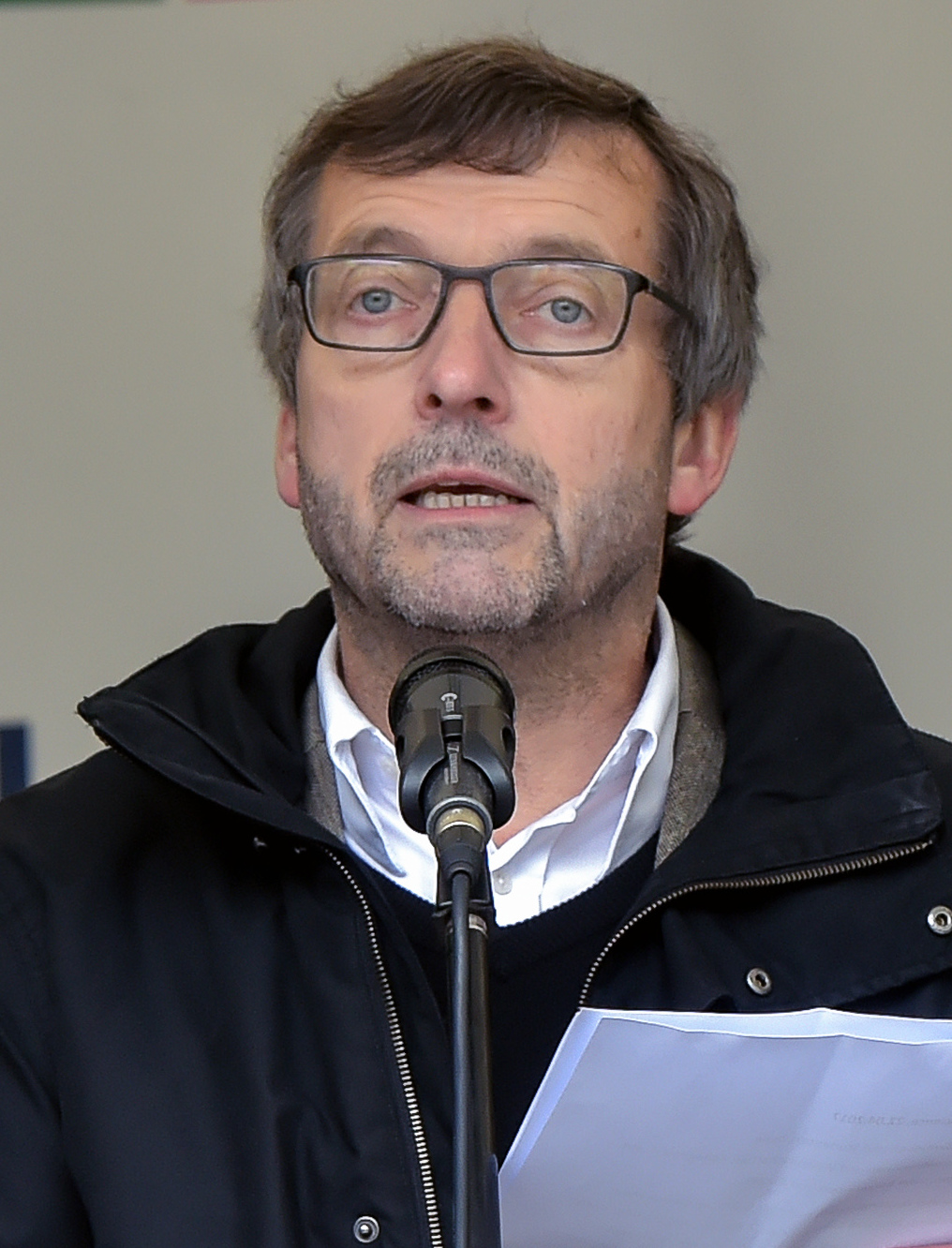
Walter Rosenthal in 2017

Walter Rosenthal (born October 11, 1954) is a German physician, pharmacologist & science manager, and President of the German Rectors' Conference since May 2023. Prior to that, he was the President of the Friedrich Schiller University Jena (2014-2023). From 2009 to 2014, he was the foundation board member and scientific director of the Max Delbrück Center for Molecular Medicine (MDC) in Berlin-Buch. From 1996 to 2008 he headed what is today the Leibniz Research Institute for Molecular Pharmacology (FMP).

== Education ==
Walter Rosenthal was born in Siegen in 1954 and studied medicine from 1974 to 1981 at the Justus Liebig University in Giessen and at the Royal Free Hospital in London. In 1983, he received his doctorate at the Justus Liebig University with a pharmacological topic, followed seven years later by his habilitation at the Free University of Berlin in the subject of pharmacology and toxicology. From 1983 to 1984, he was a research assistant at the Pharmacological Institute of the Ruprecht-Karls-Universität Heidelberg. He then moved to the Institute for Pharmacology at the Free University of Berlin, where he worked until 1991.

== Career ==
From 1991 to 1993, he worked as a visiting professor at Baylor College of Medicine in Houston, Texas on a Heisenberg fellowship . In 1993, he was appointed professor and managing director at the Rudolf Buchheim Institute for Pharmacology at the University of Giessen. Three years later, he went to Berlin as the founding director of the Research Institute for Molecular Pharmacology (FMP), today known as the Leibniz Institute for Molecular Pharmacology.

In January 2009, he moved from the FMP to the Max Delbrück Center for Molecular Medicine (MDC) in Berlin-Buch, a major research institution of the Helmholtz Association of German Research Centers, where he was appointed Scientific Director and Chairman of the Foundation Board. At the MDC, he succeeded Walter Birchmeier.

From 1998 to 2003, he was a professor at the Institute for Pharmacology at the Free University of Berlin. From 2003 to 2014, he was Professor of Molecular Pharmacology at the Institute of Pharmacology at the Charité in Paris. From 2014 to 2020, he was Professor of Cellular Signal Processing at the Friedrich Schiller University Jena.

In 2014, he was elected the first President of the Friedrich Schiller University Jena. In June 2019, he was confirmed by the Senate and the University Council by mutual agreement for another six years in office.

== Research ==
In earlier research work, Walter Rosenthal devoted himself to biomedical fundamentals in the run-up to drug research. He is an expert in cell communication, especially cellular signal transduction. An important discovery of one of his research groups is a substance that can prevent water retention in body tissue and thus the formation of edema. The group has also tracked down a mechanism that regulates the kidney's water balance.

== See also ==
- Friedrich Schiller University Jena
- Max Delbrück Center for Molecular Medicine
