= John Bettridge =

American football player (1910–1975)

No. 66
- Position: Fullback

Personal information
- Born: March 19, 1910; Sandusky, Ohio, U.S.
- Died: December 10, 1975 (aged 65); Sandusky, Ohio, U.S.
- Listed height: 5 ft 10 in (1.78 m)
- Listed weight: 188 lb (85 kg)

Career information
- College: Ohio State

Career history
- Cleveland Rams (1937); Chicago Bears (1937)

Career statistics
- Games: 9
- Rushing attempts: 22
- Rushing yards: 35
- Stats at Pro Football Reference

John William Bettridge (March 19, 1910 – December 10, 1975) was an American professional football fullback who played at Sandusky High School and later played for the Ohio State Buckeyes in college. He went on to play for the Cleveland Rams in their first season before being traded to the Chicago Bears. It was his only season. He was the father of Ed Bettridge. He died on December 10, 1975, at the age 65.
