= Ed Bettridge =

American football player (born 1940)

No. 64
- Position: Linebacker

Personal information
- Born: September 16, 1940 (age 86); Sandusky, Ohio, U.S.
- Listed height: 6 ft 1 in (1.85 m)
- Listed weight: 235 lb (107 kg)

Career information
- High school: Sandusky
- College: Bowling Green State

Career history
- Cleveland Browns (1964)

Awards and highlights
- NFL champion (1964)
- Stats at Pro Football Reference

Edward Neil Bettridge (born September 16, 1940) is an American former professional football player who played one season with the Cleveland Browns. He played college football at Bowling Green State University. His dad was John Bettridge.
