= German Rectors' Conference =

Logo

The German Rectors' Conference (German: Hochschulrektorenkonferenz – HRK) is the voluntary association of state and state-recognised universities and other higher education institutions in Germany. It currently has 271 member institutions at which around 90 per cent of all students in Germany are registered.

The HRK deals with all issues relating to the role and tasks of higher education institutions in academia and society, especially teaching and studying, research, innovation and transfer, scientific further training, internationalisation, and university self-administration and governance.

The German Rectors' Conference is managed and represented externally by a nine-member Executive Board. Walter Rosenthal, a medical doctor, has been President of the HRK since May 2023. Fundamental decisions and recommendations are made by the General Assembly (formerly the Plenum), which meets twice a year, and by the Senate.

The HRK maintains offices in Bonn, Berlin and Brussels. The HRK's financial and legal entity is the Foundation for the Promotion of the German Rectors' Conference. Its library has one of the largest special collections on higher education and science policy in the Federal Republic of Germany, with over 70,000 monographs, 800 current journals and the printed lecture directories of all German universities since 1945.

The HRK runs a number of projects under its umbrella, including the project "MODUS - Mobilität und Durchlässigkeit stärken: Anerkennung und Anrechnung an Hochschulen" and offers universities an audit of their internationalization strategies. Together with the Bertelsmann Foundation, it founded the non-profit Center for Higher Education Development (CHE) in 1994 as a think tank and consultancy for the reform of the German higher education system.

== See also ==
- Open access in Germany
