= M. planula =

M. planula may refer to a few different species.

- Macrochlamys planula, a species of air-breathing land snails in the family Ariophantidae
- Magosphaera planula, a species of Protozoa in the clade Catallacta
- Megachile planula, a bee in the family Megachilidae
- Membraniporella planula, a bryozoan in the family Cribrilinidae
- Micropeza planula, a species of stilt-legged flies in the family Micropezidae
