= Heinrich Schmidt (philosopher) =

German archivist and professor (1874–1935)

Heinrich Schmidt (December 18, 1874 – May 2, 1935) was a German archivist, naturalist, philosopher, professor and a student of Ernst Haeckel.

== Early life and education ==
Schmidt was born in Heubach in the German State of Thuringia. From 1890 to 1894 he attended a teacher training school in Hildburghausen and then worked as an elementary school teacher. In 1897 he moved on to scientific training in Jena. He studied there under the financial support of Ernst Haeckel and in 1900 became his private secretary. Since Schmidt lacked formal college training, Haeckel sent him the University of Zurich to study under his former student, Arnold Lang. There Schmidt earned his Doctorate in 1904. By 1912 he was an archivist in the Phyletic Institute and in 1916 he became head of the Haeckel Archive. Schmidt was awarded the title of full Professor in 1919.

After Haeckel's death in 1920, Schmidt became his executor and director of the Ernst-Haeckel-Haus at the Friedrich-Schiller-Universität Jena. Schmidt, as Haeckel before him, was also a member of the Deutsche Monistenbund, a society of Monists. In 1920 he became its chairman and remained so until his death in 1935. Schmidt was a staunch representative of "Haeckelism" and its theories of evolutionary development. He was also editor of the journal Monistische Monatshefte. After this publication was abolished in 1933 for political reasons, Schmidt founded the journal Nature and Spirit.

== Works ==
The management and archiving of Haeckel's vast legacy in the years following his death formed the bulk of Heinrich Schmidt's work. By 1933, however, ideological and political issues increasingly became a priority. Schmidt's predominantly social democratic thinking gave way to a radical nationalism then being espoused by the Nazis. In this context he took up some racist views which, while extreme by today's standards, were far exceeded by the opinions of his colleagues Ludwig Plate and Hans F.K. Günther.

In its later editions, Schmidt's journal "Nature and Spirit" took a detour from its monistic tradition and published works on eugenics and racial hygiene by Erwin Baur, Eugen Fischer and Fritz Lenz. However, their attempts to reinterpret the legacy of Ernst Haeckel into a National Socialist meaning ultimately failed.

== Selected publications ==
- Haeckels Embryonenbilder. (Haeckel's Embryo Photographs), Frankfurt a. M. 1909
- Fruchtbarkeit und Vermehrung (Fertility and Reproduction), Urania 1927
- Der Kampf ums Dasein (Fight for Survival), Urania 1930
- Mensch und Affe (Man and Monkey), Urania 1932
- Philosophisches Wörterbuch (Philosophical Dictionary)
- Ernst Haeckel. Denkmal eines großen Lebens (Ernst Haeckel. Monument to a Great Life), Jena 1934
