= Ernst-Haeckel-Haus =

Building in Jena, Germany

Coordinates: 50°55′29″N 11°34′55″E

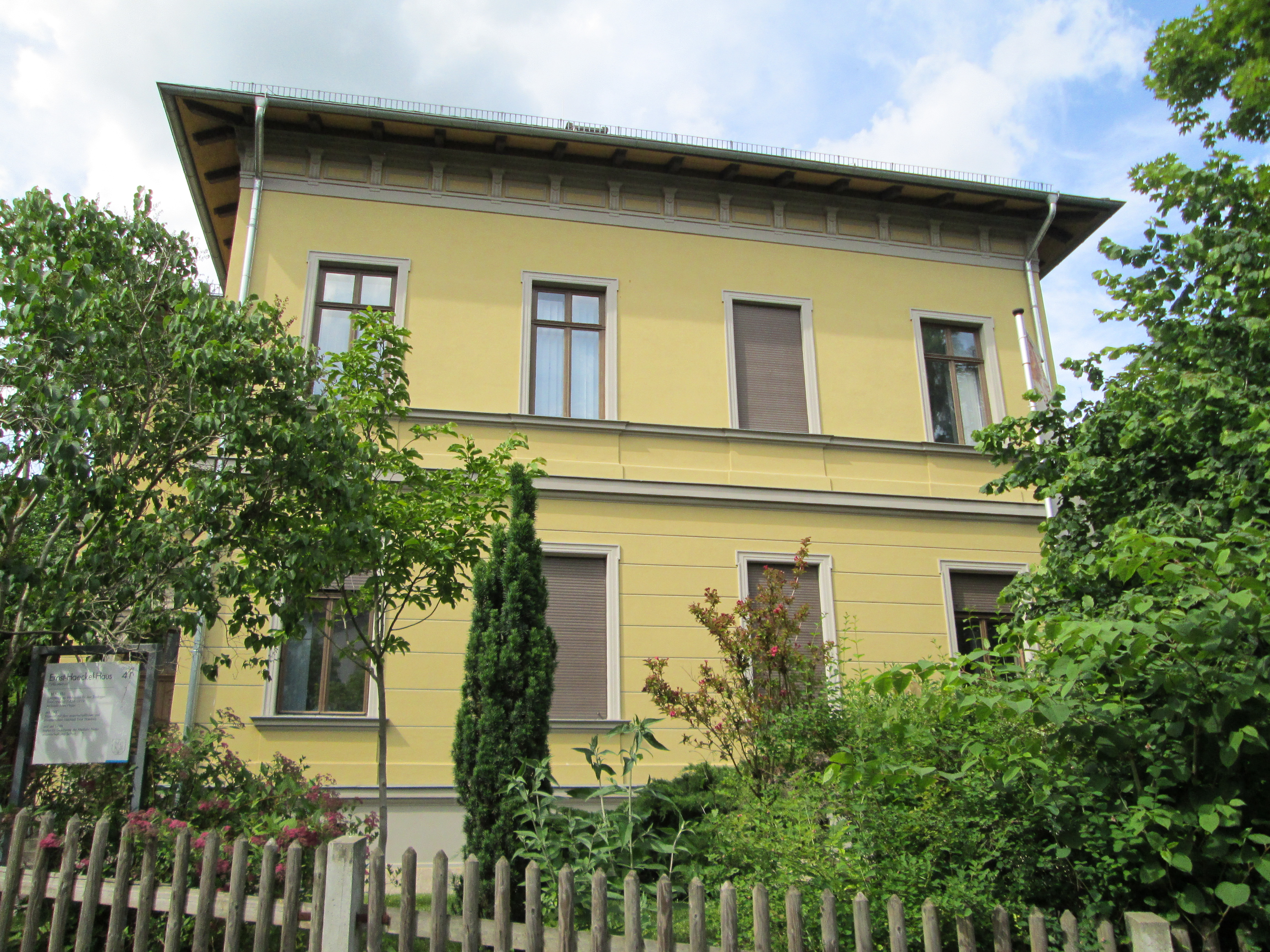
Ernst-Haeckel-Haus, view of the exterior

Ernst-Haeckel-Haus, also known as Villa Medusa, is a building and an institution of the Faculty of Biological Sciences of the University of Jena in Jena, Germany. The building houses the Chair for the History and Philosophy of Science, as well as the archives of biologist Ernst Haeckel, and a museum. It is one of Germany's oldest institutes dedicated to the history of science, founded in 1920. It was conceived during Haeckel's lifetime; he died in 1919. The villa was built from 1882 to 1883 in an Italianate style, and contains decorative elements inspired by jellyfish. The villa is open to the public through guided tours.

== History ==
The house was built as a residence for biologist Ernst Haeckel in 1882–1883, in an Italianate style. Haeckel spent much of his career as a marine biologist, and published richly illustrated books presenting marine life forms in an artistic way, notably in Kunstformen der Natur. The interior of his own house was also decorated with lamps and painted ceiling ornaments directly inspired by the forms of jellyfish; some of the decorations have survived. The decorations also gave the villa its name (jellyfish being the medusa-phase of certain gelatinous members of the subphylum Medusozoa). Haeckel's own drawing of a jellyfish found in the waters of Sri Lanka served as a ceiling decoration in the dining room.

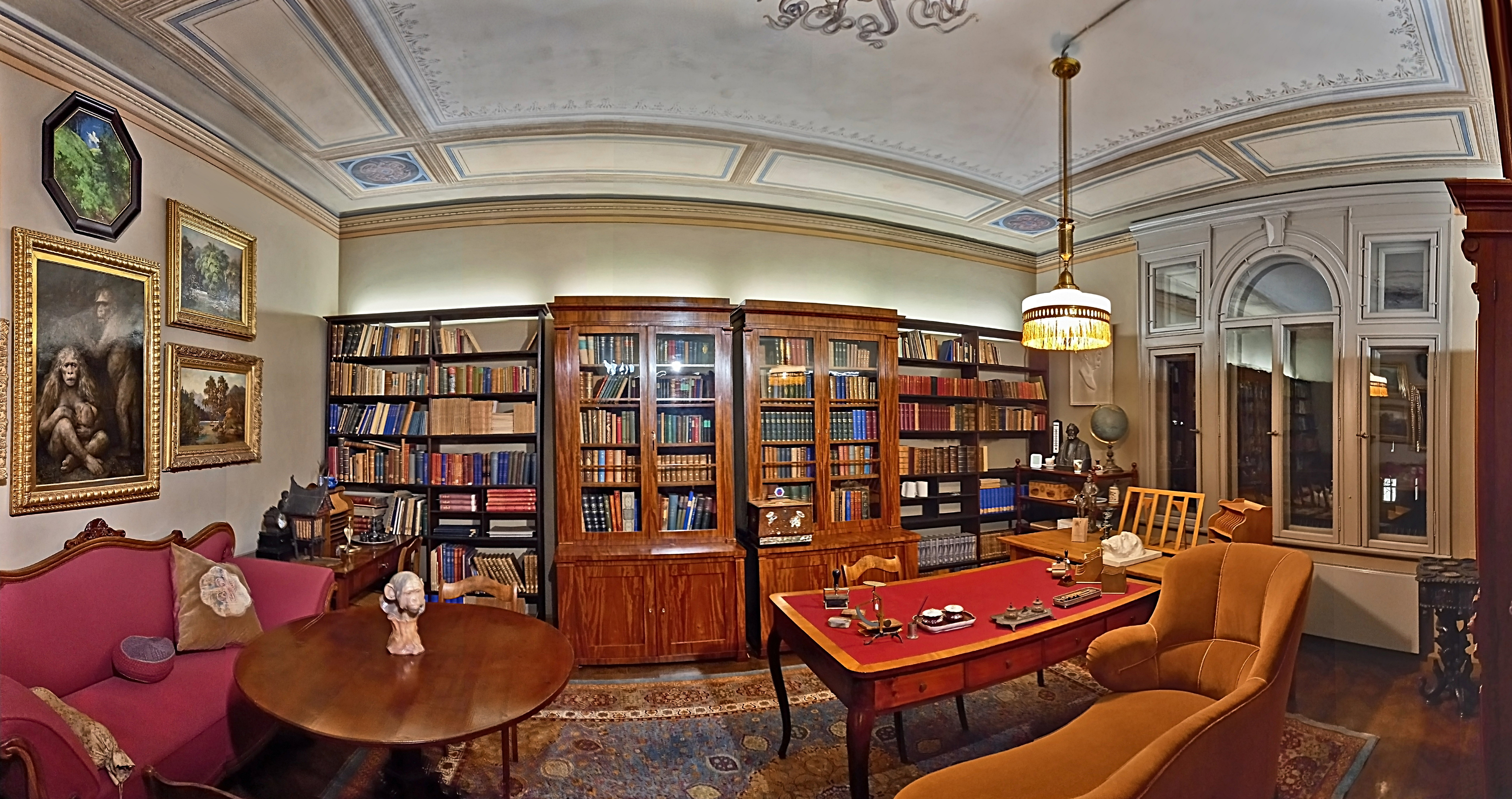
Interior view of Haeckel's former study

The house was built in the vicinity of the newly erected zoological institute. Haeckel and his family lived in the villa until his death in 1919. Haeckel also used the house as his workplace.

Haeckel, who died at the age of 85, had already during his lifetime regarded as a historically important biologist in Germany. The idea to preserve his own collections in a dedicated museum, as well as to preserve his archive for the future, was already formulated during his lifetime. Following his death, the Ernst-Haeckel-Haus was founded in 1920 to serve as an archive and a museum. It is one of the oldest institutes in Germany dedicated to the history of science, second only to the Karl-Sudhoff-Institut at Leipzig University. Its first director was Heinrich Schmidt, who after the Nazi rise to power made a conscious effort to present Haeckel's legacy in a way which would appeal to Nazi ideology. Similarly, his successor as director, Victor Julius Franz, continued to portray Haeckel in a light favourable to Nazism. Following World War II, the villa and its associated institution became tied to the University of Jena. In 1965, a Chair for the History of Science was established at the institute and its scope has successively been broadened from its original focus on the life and achievements of Ernst Haeckel.

== Current use ==
Today, the villa houses the Chair for the History and Philosophy of Science of the University of Jena, as well as the archives of Haeckel and a museum. It is open to the public through guided tours. The archive of Haeckel, preserved in the villa, contain around 38,000 letters as well as other documents related to Haeckel, and a research library.

== Sources cited ==
- Krausse, Erika; Hossfeld, Uwe (1999). "Das Ernst-Haeckel-Haus in Jena Von der privaten Stiftung zum Universitätsinstitut (1912-1979)". In Geus, Armin; Junker, Thomas (eds.). Repräsentationsformen in den biologischen Wissenschaften. Berlin: Deutsche Gesellschaft für Geschichte und Theorie der Biologie e.V. (DGGTB). pp. 203–232.
- Mann, Rosemarie (1990). "Ernst Haeckel, Zoologie und Jugendstil". Berichte zur Wissenschaftsgeschichte (in German). 13 (1). Wiley: 1–11. doi:10.1002/bewi.19900130102. ISSN 1522-2365.
- Wulf, Andrea (2015). The invention of nature. Alexander von Humboldt's new world. Vintage books. ISBN 978-0-345-80629-1.
