= Jena Phyletisches Museum =

Natural history museum in Jena

Coordinates: 50°55′27″N 11°35′01″E

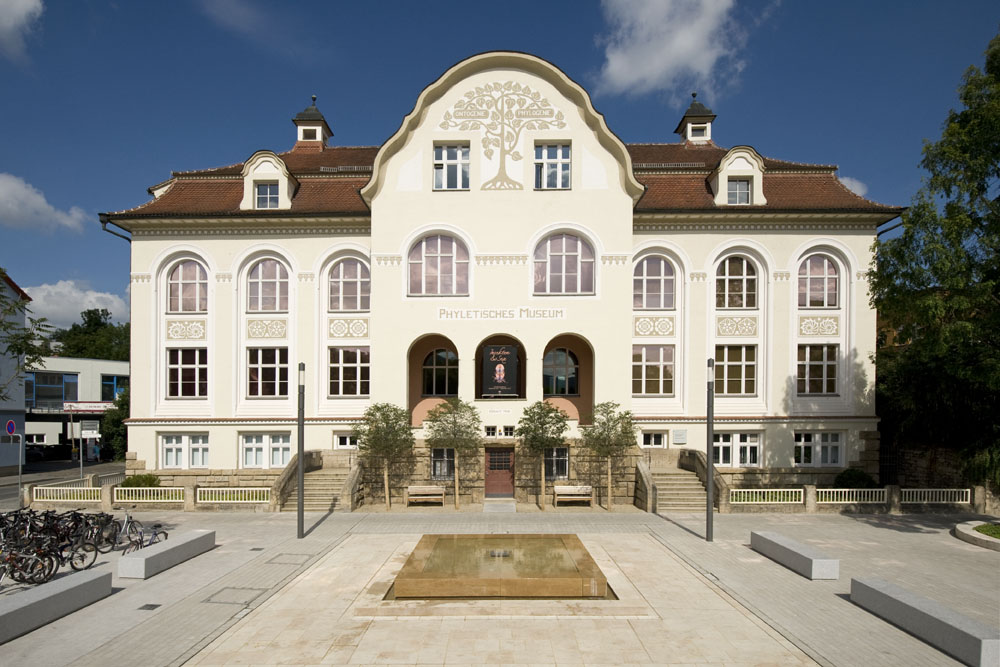
The Phyletic Museum in 2012

Jena Phyletisches Museum (or Jena Phyletic Museum) is a museum in the German town of Jena. It was established by the scientist Ernst Haeckel, as an institute dedicated to explaining evolution to the public. Exhibits include skeletons, stuffed animals, fossils and zoological artworks from Haeckel's Kunstformen der Natur, and cover topics including the principles of evolution, biodiversity and the links between different taxonomic groups.

A temporary exhibit for 2019 featured an aquarium of living jellyfish.

== Location ==
The museum can be found on Vor dem Neutor, close to Jena Paradies station and only about 150m from the town centre. It is open Tuesday to Sunday except for Christmas and New Year, and there is a small fee for entry.

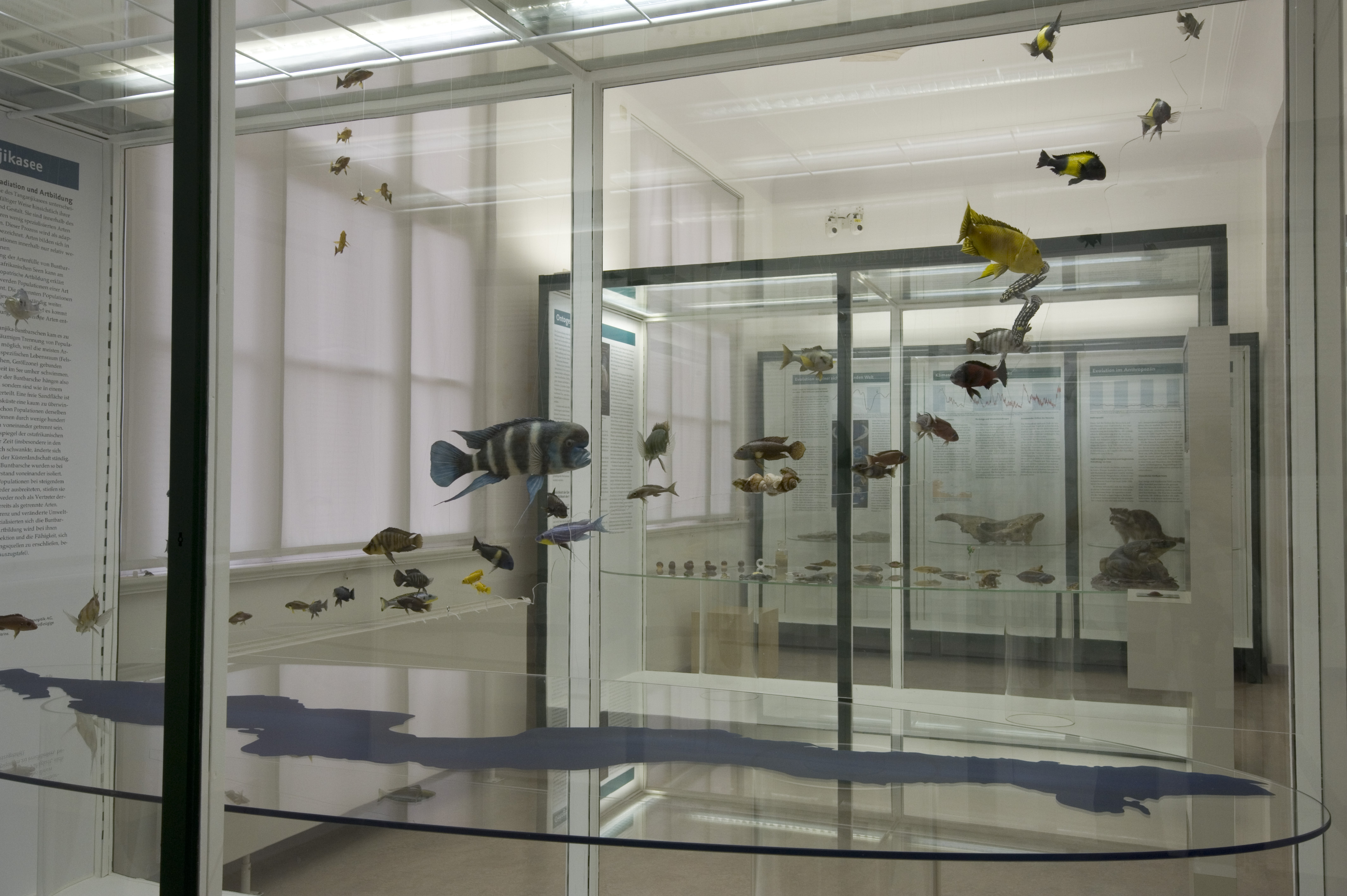
a display of cichlid fish from Lake Tanganyika

== History ==
Collections of zoological specimens which had been assembled in Jena in the 18th and 19th Centuries were donated to the museum. Some items date back to when Johann Wolfgang von Goethe was director of the university's anatomical-zoological collection.

The museum building was designed in an Art Nouveau style by the architect Carl Dittmar, based on sketches by Ernst Haeckel, then built in 1907 (construction beginning on 28 August 1907) and given by Haeckel to the University of Jena on 30 July 1908, as a gesture to mark the university's 350th anniversary, but no permanent exhibits were placed in the museum until 1912.

The walls are decorated with scientific terms coined by Haeckel – 'Phylogenie' and 'Ontogenie'.

In 2008, a light show was projected on the building as part of the 'Jena Leuchtet' event.

Today the museum is part of the university's department of special zoology and evolutionary biology and stores 500,000 items.
