= World riddle =

Term in ontology and consciousness studies

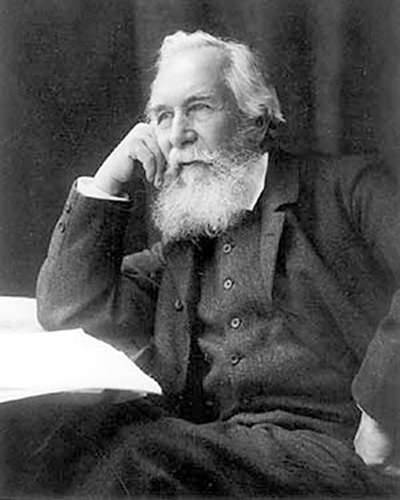
Ernst Haeckel wrote about the World Riddle in 1895.

World riddle (Welträtsel in German) is a philosophical term concerning fundamental questions about the nature of the universe and the meaning of life. The term gained prominence in the late 19th century and is most closely associated with two key figures: the philosopher Friedrich Nietzsche and the biologist Ernst Haeckel.

Nietzsche mentioned Welträthsel in several of his writings, exploring profound existential questions. However, it was Haeckel who popularized the term with his influential book, Die Welträthsel (1895–1899), later published in English as The Riddle of the Universe (1901). In this work, Haeckel attempted to resolve these riddles using a scientific and monistic worldview.

The World Riddle has also been explored as an inspiration or allegorical theme in some musical compositions, notably the unresolved harmonic progression at the end of Also sprach Zarathustra (1896), one of Richard Strauss's tone poems .

== View of Nietzsche ==
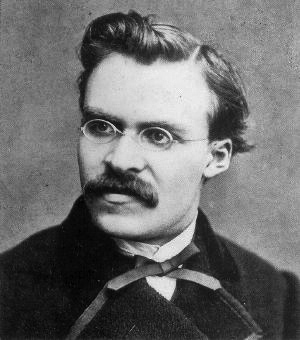
Friedrich Nietzsche

Friedrich Nietzsche referred to the "World Riddle" (Welträthsel) in several of his writings.

== Emil du Bois-Reymond ==
Emil du Bois-Reymond used the term "World Riddle" in 1880 for seven great questions of science, such as the ultimate nature of matter and the origin of simple sensations. In a lecture to the Berlin Academy of Sciences he declared that neither science nor philosophy could ever explain these riddles.

== View of Haeckel ==
Ernst Haeckel viewed the World Riddle as a dual-question of the form, "What is the nature of the physical universe and what is the nature of human thinking?" which he explained, in a lecture in 1892, would have a single answer since humans and the universe were contained within one system, a mono-system:

The "exacting" Berlin physiologist [du Bois-Reymond] shut this knowledge out from his mind, and with a short-sightedness almost inconceivable statement, placed this special neurological question alongside of the one great "world-riddle", the fundamental question of substance, the general question of the connection between matter and energy. As I long ago pointed out, these two great questions are not two separate "world-riddles". The neurological problem of consciousness is only a special case of the all-comprehending cosmological problem, the question of substance. "If we understood the nature of matter and energy, we should also understand how the substance underlying them can under certain conditions feel, desire, and think." Consciousness, like feeling and willing, among the higher animals is a mechanical work of the ganglion-cells, and as such must be carried back to chemical and physical events in the plasma of these.

— Ernst Haeckel, Monism as Connecting Religion and Science

Haeckel had written that human behavior and feeling could be explained, within the laws of the physical universe, as "mechanical work of the ganglion-cells" as stated.

== View of William James ==
The philosopher and psychologist William James has questioned the attitude of thinking that a single answer applies to everything or everyone. In his book Pragmatism (1907) he satirized the world-riddle as follows:

All the great single-word answers to the world's riddle, such as God, the One, Reason, Law, Spirit, Matter, Nature, Polarity, the Dialectic Process, the Idea, the Self, the Oversoul, draw the admiration that men have lavished on them from this oracular role. By amateurs in philosophy and professionals alike, the universe is represented as a queer sort of petrified sphinx whose appeal to man consists in a monotonous challenge to his divining powers. THE Truth: what a perfect idol of the rationalistic mind!

— William James, Pragmatism, 1907

== See also ==
- Epistemology - study of the nature of knowledge.
- Existentialism - philosophy of being/existence.
- Weltschmerz
