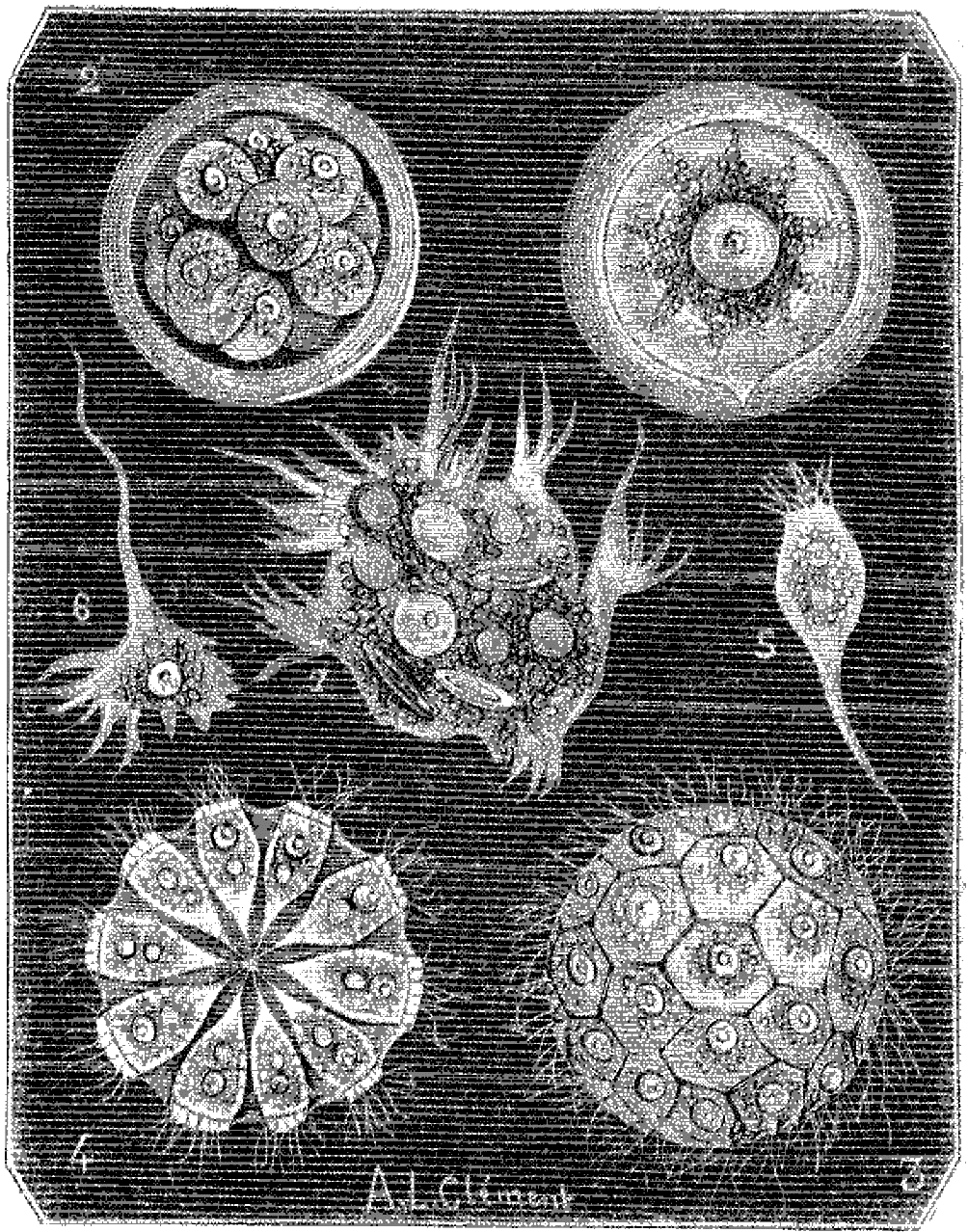
- Image from "La Nature - Revue des Sciences", 1879: 1. Ovular phase of the Magosphere - 2. Segmentation of the egg inside the cyst. - 3. An adult magosphere whose surface is at the focus of the microscope. - 4. The same one, whose equatorial plane is placed at the microscope's focus to show the internal disposition of the cells. - 5, 6, 7: Cells of the Magosphere after their isolation, taking various amoeboid forms before encysting to become an egg.

Scientific classification
- Domain: Eukaryota
- (unranked): incertae sedis
- Genus: Magosphaera; Haeckel, 1869
- Species: M. planula

Binomial name
- Magosphaera planula Haeckel, 1869

= Magosphaera =

Species of micro-organism

Magosphaera planula was a spherical multiflagellated multicellular microorganism discovered by Ernst Haeckel in September 1869 while he was collecting sponges off Gisøy island off the coast of Norway. He claimed to have seen it break up into separate cells which then became amoeboid. Nobody else has found it, and he kept no specimens of it. It played an important part in theories of metazoan phylogeny into the early 20th century.
