= 99.3 FM =

FM radio frequency

The following radio stations broadcast on FM frequency 99.3 MHz:

== Argentina ==
- Aguilares in Aguilares, Tucumán
- Alternativa in Villa de Merlo, San Luis
- Centro in Villa María, Córdoba
- Clasica in Jujuy
- del Este in Berazategui, Buenos Aires
- Impacto in Córdoba
- La dos in Corrientes
- Libertad in Charata, Chaco
- LRI712 Mitre Santa Fe in Santa Fe de la Vera Cruz, Santa Fe
- Kiss in Junin, Buenos Aires
- Futuro in Benito Juarez, Buenos Aires
- Integración in San Miguel, Buenos Aires
- La Nueve in 9 de Julio, Corrientes
- Municipal in Chilecito, La Rioja
- Oxígeno in Oberá, Misiones
- Panamericana in Huerta Grande, Córdoba
- Radio Maria in 25 de Mayo, Misiones
- RKM Radio Solidaria in Rosario, Santa Fe
- Senda antigua in La Plata, Buenos Aires
- Total in Paso de los Libres, Corrientes

== Australia ==
- 2KY in Gloucester, New South Wales
- 2NSB in Sydney, New South Wales
- ABC Classic in Bega, New South Wales
- Bay FM 99.3 in Port Stephens, New South Wales
- 2BXS in Bathurst, New South Wales
- Triple J in Bundaberg, Queensland
- 7EDG in Hobart, Tasmania
- 3NRG in Melbourne, Victoria
- 3RPC in Portland, Victoria
- Triple J in Perth, Western Australia

== Brazil ==
- ZYD 465 in Rio de Janeiro, Rio de Janeiro
- ZYD 435 in Maringá, Paraná
- ZYD 576 in Porto Alegre, Rio Grande do Sul

== Canada (Channel 257) ==
- CBLA-FM-5 in Bancroft, Ontario
- CBPT-FM in Fort Nelson, British Columbia
- CBV-FM-6 in La Malbaie, Quebec
- CBXN-FM in Fort McMurray, Alberta
- CFAN-FM in Miramichi City, New Brunswick
- CFBA-FM in Foam Lake, Saskatchewan
- CFOR-FM in Maniwaki, Quebec
- CFOX-FM in Vancouver, British Columbia
- CFSF-FM in Sturgeon Falls, Ontario
- CHFM-FM-1 in Banff, Alberta
- CHGM-FM in Gaspe, Quebec
- CHSB-FM in Bedford, Nova Scotia
- CIUP-FM in Edmonton, Alberta
- CJAN-FM in Asbestos, Quebec
- CJBC-4-FM in London, Ontario
- CJGB-FM in Meaford, Ontario
- CJJM-FM in Espanola, Ontario
- CJPE-FM in Picton, Ontario (Prince Edward County)
- CJQC-FM in Liverpool, Nova Scotia
- CKDV-FM in Prince George, British Columbia
- CKGB-FM in Timmins, Ontario
- CKQN-FM in Baker Lake, Nunavut
- CKQR-FM in Castlegar, British Columbia
- CKUA-FM-2 in Lethbridge, Alberta

== China ==
- CNR Business Radio in Baotou
- CNR China Traffic Radio in Shenyang
- Music FM Radio Guangdong in Guangdong

== Estonia ==
- Nömme radio

== Guatemala (Channel 29) ==
- TGAD in Flores

== Indonesia ==
- Fajri FM Radio Bogor in Bogor, West Java

== Israel ==
- Radio Makan in Beersheba, the Galilee Panhandle, Haifa and Jerusalem

== Malaysia ==
- Ai FM in Central Kelantan
- Raaga in Klang Valley

== Mexico ==
- XHAFA-FM in Nanchital, Veracruz
- XHCQR-FM in Cancún, Quintana Roo
- XHETU-FM in Tampico, Tamaulipas
- XHGW-FM in Ciudad Victoria, Tamaulipas
- XHHHI-FM in Hidalgo del Parral, Chihuahua
- XHJL-FM in Guamúchil, Sinaloa
- XHMRA-FM in Mérida, Yucatán
- XHMZQ-FM in Tepache, Sonora
- XHNK-FM in Nuevo Laredo, Tamaulipas
- XHNQ-FM in Acapulco, Guerrero
- XHOCL-FM in Tijuana, Baja California
- XHORA-FM in Orizaba, Veracruz
- XHOX-FM in Ciudad Obregón, Sonora
- XHPOP-FM in Mexico City
- XHQAA-FM in Chetumal, Quintana Roo
- XHRPC-FM in Chihuahua, Chihuahua
- XHSAC-FM in Saltillo, Coahuila
- XHSAJ-FM in Santa Catarina Juquila, Oaxaca
- XHSD-FM in Silao, Guanajuato
- XHTL-FM in San Luis Potosí, San Luis Potosí
- XHUE-FM in Tuxtla Gutiérrez, Chiapas
- XHZAZ-FM in Zacatecas, Zacatecas
- XHZIR-FM in Tingambato, Michoacán

== Philippines ==
- DWBV in Baler, Aurora
- DWTJ in Alaminos, Pangasinan
- DXOG in Gingoog
- DXFE-FM in Iligan, Lanao Del Norte

== United States (Channel 257) ==
- KADA-FM in Ada, Oklahoma
- KAPW in White Oak, Texas
- KASR in Atkins, Arkansas
- KCGQ in Gordonville, Missouri
- KCLI-FM in Cordell, Oklahoma
- KCLR in Boonville, Missouri
- KCMD in Grants Pass, Oregon
- KDDS in Elma, Washington
- KDER in Comstock, Texas
- KDRM in Moses Lake, Washington
- KDST in Dyersville, Iowa
- KEFH in Clarendon, Texas
- KEHM in Colorado City, Texas
- KEMP in Payson, Arizona
- KFOH-LP in Saint Joseph, Missouri
- KGVE in Grove, Oklahoma
- KGXG-LP in Victoria, Texas
- KGXY-LP in Muir Beach, California
- KHBX-LP in Hobbs, New Mexico
- KHDD-LP in Oklahoma City, Oklahoma
- KHZY in Overton, Nebraska
- KJOY in Stockton, California
- KJWL in Fresno, California
- KKBB in Bakersfield, California
- KKDQ in Thief River Falls, Minnesota
- KKTS-FM in Douglas, Wyoming
- KLOR-FM in Ponca City, Oklahoma
- KLVS in Grass Valley, California
- KLZY-LP in Salina, Kansas
- KMAB-LP in Madras, Oregon
- KMGW in Naches, Washington
- KMXE in Red Lodge, Montana
- KMXX in Imperial, California
- KOKE-FM in Thorndale, Texas
- KPBA in Pine Bluff, Arkansas
- KPCH in Ruston, Louisiana
- KPSM in Brownwood, Texas
- KQEZ in St. Regis, Montana
- KQJO in St. Joseph, Louisiana
- KRGT in Indian Springs, Nevada
- KRWV-LP in Gold Canyon, Arizona
- KTGA in Saratoga, Wyoming
- KTPG in Paragould, Arkansas
- KUNQ in Houston, Missouri
- KVDI in Huxley, Iowa
- KVYN in Saint Helena, California
- KWAY-FM in Waverly, Iowa
- KWFL in Roswell, New Mexico
- KWIC (FM) in Topeka, Kansas
- KWLZ in Shasta Lake City, California
- KWMN in Rushford, Minnesota
- KXRZ in Alexandria, Minnesota
- KYTM in Corrigan, Texas
- KZUC-LP in Edmond, Oklahoma
- WAJK in La Salle, Illinois
- WATZ in Alpena, Michigan
- WBET-FM in Sturgis, Michigan
- WBQQ in Kennebunk, Maine
- WBT in Chester, South Carolina
- WBTV-LP in Burlington, Vermont
- WBWH-LP in Bluffton, Ohio
- WCJC in Van Buren, Indiana
- WCON in Cornelia, Georgia
- WDMP-FM in Dodgeville, Wisconsin
- WDUK in Havana, Illinois
- WEBZ in Mexico Beach, Florida
- WEXX in Elizabethton, Tennessee
- WFDA-LP in Live Oak, Florida
- WFLK in Seneca Falls, New York
- WFQX (FM) in Front Royal, Virginia
- WFRD in Hanover, New Hampshire
- WHKF in Harrisburg, Pennsylvania
- WHMJ in Franklin, Pennsylvania
- WJQK in Zeeland, Michigan
- WKCN in Lumpkin, Georgia
- WKEB in Medford, Wisconsin
- WKJM in Petersburg, Virginia
- WKTJ in Farmington, Maine
- WKVI in Knox, Indiana
- WLAU in Heidelberg, Mississippi
- WLEZ in Lebanon Junction, Kentucky
- WLLG in Lowville, New York
- WLLS in Beulah, Michigan
- WLRQ in Cocoa, Florida
- WLRZ-LP in Hickory, North Carolina
- WLZX-FM in Northampton, Massachusetts
- WMFC (FM) in Monroeville, Alabama
- WMNP in Block Island, Rhode Island
- WNMR in Pembroke, Georgia
- WNRX in Jefferson City, Tennessee
- WNXT in Portsmouth, Ohio
- WOWN in Shawano, Wisconsin
- WOWZ-FM in Accomac, Virginia
- WPBX in Crossville, Tennessee
- WPKL in Uniontown, Pennsylvania
- WPMQ-LP in Charlestown, Indiana
- WQDK in Gatesville, North Carolina
- WRWB-FM in Ellenville, New York
- WSCH in Aurora, Indiana
- WSNN in Potsdam, New York
- WSRR-LP in Murfreesboro, Tennessee
- WTNS in Coshocton, Ohio
- WTPB-LP in Rockford, Illinois
- WTUP-FM in Guntown, Mississippi
- WVBX in Spotsylvania, Virginia
- WVLE in Scottsville, Kentucky
- WVLO in Cridersville, Ohio
- WWCN in Fort Myers Beach, Florida
- WWGY in Fulton, Kentucky
- WWKT in Kingstree, South Carolina
- WXFM-FM in Mount Zion, Illinois
- WXRA in Inglis, Florida
- WXRY-LP in Columbia, South Carolina
- WZAX in Nashville, North Carolina
- WZBZ in Pleasantville, New Jersey
- WZLT in Lexington, Tennessee
- WZRE-LP in Perry, Florida
- WZRF-LP in Wilmington, North Carolina
- WZXR in South Williamsport, Pennsylvania
