= Smooth jazz radio =

Radio format featuring smooth jazz

Smooth jazz is a radio format that includes songs by artists such as George Benson, Pat Metheny, Kenny G, Luther Vandross, Sade, Robin Thicke, Anita Baker, Basia, Dave Koz and Chuck Mangione. It began in the 1980s as "adult alternative" or NAC (New Age Contemporary or New Adult Contemporary), a well-defined radio format, with jazz, new-age music and adult contemporary music. In the 1990s, the format became much more jazz-oriented, with very little new-age, and emphasizing young artists.

Around 2007, the format became less popular; it was abandoned by several high-profile radio stations across the United States, including WQCD (now WFAN-FM) in New York, WNUA Chicago (now WCHI-FM), WJJZ in Philadelphia (now WUMR), and KKSF (now KOSF) in San Francisco. Programmers say the audience for the format has aged beyond the prime demographic sought by advertisers. Despite the format's demise outside a handful of commercial radio outlets, a number of non-commercial and HD stations have taken up the music. It is still available on SiriusXM on Channel 66, known as "Watercolors" and on the Music Choice cable radio service. In addition, smooth jazz concerts, recording sales, as well as increased smooth jazz offerings on the Internet, continue to show strong fan support for the genre.

== Early history ==
Smooth jazz as a radio format has its roots in the construction of what were once called "beautiful music" stations, which generally played fifteen-minute sets consisting of instrumentals bookending a vocal song or two. The incubators of the format were specialty shows at night or on the weekends, in places such as Atlanta (WQXI-FM and WVEE-FM), Miami (WWWL-FM) and San Antonio (KTFM). The first jazz radio station to attempt to reach an audience beyond hardcore jazz fans full-time was New York's WRVR-FM, which was acquired by Sonderling Broadcasting in 1976. Under its new management, WRVR more than tripled its audience by emphasizing artists like George Benson and Pat Metheny that were crossing over to more popular formats. Other early pioneers included WLOQ in Orlando, Florida (which began programming such a format in 1977), Russ Davis in Atlanta and "Jazz Flavours", Al Winters and "The Quiet Storm", Ross Block, Dave Caprita and Stu Grant at Love 94FM with "Sunday Morning Jazz" in Miami and Art Good at KIFM San Diego with "Lights Out San Diego".

In 1983, "adult alternative" became a well-defined radio format, with jazz, new-age music and adult contemporary music. In 1987, the switch by album-oriented rock KMET in Los Angeles to KTWV "The Wave" made the format more popular.

After programmer Frank Cody began "The Wave" in Los Angeles and the simultaneous KIFM (San Diego) and the eclectic KKSF (San Francisco), the number of stations banking on "The Wave's" softer sound grew quickly. Those included "Breezin' 100.7" in Milwaukee and KHIH in Denver programmed by consultant Gary Guthrie, WNUA (Chicago) consulted by Cody, WVAE (a short-lived Wave network affiliate from 1987–89) and WJZZ in Detroit, WNWV in Cleveland (which began as a Wave affiliate but eventually moved to local programming), and the re-launch of WQCD (CD101.9), New York. Also Love94FM [WWWL, later WLVE] in Miami/Ft. Lauderdale, an early innovator with its "Sunday Morning Jazz" show went totally smooth jazz by 1990, not long after The Wave in Los Angeles had switched to the format. The format had been deemed "new-age" originally and radio stations like WNUA Chicago and KNUA Seattle emulated the phrase in their call letters. For a short time in 1987–1988, Chicago actually had two such stations, as the "Wave" network was also heard on WTWV-FM, licensed to suburban Des Plaines (now WPPN).

In the late 1980s, research firm Cody/Leach conducted a study for WNUA–Chicago; it was through the verbatim responses from listeners that the name "Smooth Jazz" was identified. WNUA then adopted the slogan "Smooth Rock and Smooth Jazz", replacing the old slogan "Music for a New Age" as the station added more vocals and dropped most "avant-garde" instrumentals. Under the direction of General Manager John Gehron, "Smooth Rock" was dropped. Cody is credited with making Smooth Jazz a household name, giving rise to its nationwide proliferation through the firm Broadcast Architecture, the widely syndicated "The Jazz Show with David Sanborn" and his association with saxophonist Dave Koz. Cody was also responsible for overseeing the launch of the now defunct Satellite Music Network's syndicated "Wave" format.

Over a six-year period ending in 1993, the format increased its audience by 140 percent, and from 1992 to 1993, by 67 percent. Listeners were 71 percent white and 28 percent black. Advertisers recognized that adult alternative music tended to attract buyers of upscale items. The format became much more jazz-oriented, with very little new-age, and even while emphasizing young artists, the format kept its heritage acts as well. However, smooth jazz did add artists from adult contemporary music to increase its popularity with a larger audience; artists included Mariah Carey, Bonnie Raitt, Sting, Bruce Springsteen, Paul Simon, Michael Bolton, Tina Turner, and Janet Jackson. The smooth jazz format also added R&B; according to Cary Goldberg of JVC, Paul Hardcastle "brought a sophisticated, urban groove" to the format. She said, "Instead of bringing jazz to R&B, he's brought an R&B groove to contemporary jazz."

The smooth jazz music mix included 70 percent instrumentals and 30 percent vocals. Programmers no longer regarded the music as merely "background". The format's most successful stations included WNUA, KKSF, KOAI, WNWV and KIFM, as well as WQCD, which had a significant rating increase in Fall 1993.

In 1994, smooth jazz experienced the largest increase in the relationship between audience share and advertising revenue ("power ratio"). Although the format was increasing in popularity, M Street Journal counted 43 stations in the format, down from 64 in 1989. But new stations such as KKJZ in Portland, Oregon and KLJZ in New Orleans experienced immediate success. New stations in 1995 included KCIY in Kansas City, Missouri; KMJZ in Minneapolis; WSJZ in Buffalo, New York; and WJCD in Norfolk, Virginia.

Smooth Jazz has gone on to be recognized as a successful radio format, first emerging in name in the mid- to late-1980s (often, they would be transitioned from existing "new-age" stations) and subsequently spreading into most radio markets within the United States as well as to other countries.

== Smooth jazz radio today ==
=== Recent problems ===
The smooth jazz radio format continued to grow and thrive through the 1990s and early 2000s, though in the late 2000s most markets began losing smooth jazz stations. In a number of media markets, this format is no longer available over the air except online, via Music Choice (an option made available by some cable television providers such as Comcast), and on HD Radio. Currently, the most prominent of the few remaining commercial (and independently programmed) smooth jazz stations are WSBZ "The Seabreeze" in Destin, Florida, and WEIB in Northampton, Massachusetts.

Three of the originators of the smooth jazz format - WQCD in New York City, WNUA in Chicago, and KKSF in San Francisco - have all changed format in the last decade. The format has also disappeared from the commercial radio dial in most other major and medium markets in the United States, and has completely vanished in Canada, where the format was less common at its peak due to relative lack of content to fulfill Canadian content regulations.

However, smooth jazz or some variant thereof has made a minor comeback in some markets, via AM stations (see below), FM HD Radio side channel/analog translator combos, or so-called "Franken-FM"s (actually low-power analog television stations on Channel 6 which serve a double function as radio stations due to the audio portion of the broadcast being audible on 87.75 MHz, possible because the FCC has not yet required low-power TV stations to convert to digital transmission). One such Such "Franken-FM" has popped up in Chicago (WLFM-LP, which has since changed format several times) and Anchorage, Alaska (with a more traditional jazz/blues flavor as KNIK-LP, using the call sign of a former smooth jazz station there which had flipped to adult contemporary). The format made a second comeback in Chicago in December 2014 via an FM HD side channel/analog translator combo. Similar FM HD side channel/analog translator combos also briefly allowed the format to return to the airwaves in markets such as Detroit, Orlando, Florida, and Honolulu, Hawaii; all of these have since changed format.

In January 2012, in a rare case, a former smooth jazz station actually returned to its former format after the replacement format had failed. WNWV/107.3 in Cleveland had dropped its long-running "Wave" smooth-jazz format in favor of adult alternative after Christmas of 2009, under the ownership of Elyria-Lorain Broadcasting. On January 4, 2012, new owners Rubber City Radio Group restored the "Wave" format to the analog radio dial in Cleveland as a Smooth AC outlet, after a period of stunting with Christmas music. In 2013 the station evolved back into smooth jazz, although the word "jazz" was not included in the station's imaging. The format changed once again, albeit rather abruptly, at the start of 2020.

=== Reasons ===
The decline in popularity of the smooth jazz format has been blamed on a variety of factors, including lack of exposing compelling new music, over-reliance on instrumental cover versions of pop songs similar to the mostly-defunct Beautiful Music format, and Arbitron's PPM reports showing lower ratings returns for smooth jazz stations than the traditional diary system had. Lack of revenue and the genre not being viable during the Great Recession have also been cited as reasons. Many purists of the format also feel that the smooth jazz interpretation has strayed too far from its roots in contemporary jazz and new-age music by over-relying on soft urban vocals, with R&B artists such as Beyoncé Knowles and Aretha Franklin now staples of many smooth-jazz playlists. Others indicate that the repetition of the same tracks on stations—particularly those owned by Clear Channel Communications (now iHeart Media)—and the reduction of artists recording tracks resulting in fewer tracks for airplay may have also contributed to the decline.

Time to stop complaining about it not being the way it used to be ... and start embracing the way it is and the way it's going to be in the future ... whatever that may be! Hello, Tomorrow.

— Dave Koz

American saxophonist Dave Koz responded back in November 2009 to the claims that the smooth jazz radio genre was in decline by stating that although the audience has aged and not enough young people were embracing the format, making it harder to gain advertising revenue, the genre is still seeing the support in record sales and audiences at shows. He also suggested that the format may move from a genre covered by big FM stations to one covered by smaller stations, in particular Internet radio stations, which were showing an increase in popularity.

Some of the former terrestrial smooth jazz stations, including the former KHJZ in Houston, the former WVMV in Detroit, and the former WLVE in Miami continue to offer smooth jazz programming as Internet streams or as offerings on their HD subchannels. Some stations which are still providing smooth jazz and are still popular in their respective markets, including Jazz FM in the United Kingdom used to integrate traditional and popular jazz and jazz standards alongside smooth jazz tracks in their playlists and the internet only radio station Best Smooth Jazz hosted by Rod Lucas.

=== The Smooth AC format ===
One track several smooth jazz stations tried, in order to attract more younger listeners (particularly in the important 25-54 age demographic) without completely alienating jazz fans, was to evolve the format into a hybrid known as Smooth Adult Contemporary. Smooth AC stations played more of the vocalists popular on smooth jazz stations, such as Luther Vandross, Sade, Robin Thicke, Anita Baker, and Basia, while incorporating more mainstream and urban AC material from artists such as Celine Dion, Mary J. Blige, and Maroon 5 and limiting instrumentals to two or three cuts an hour (and usually restricting airplay of instrumentals to artists such as Kenny G, Dave Koz and Chuck Mangione who had crossover pop success). In markets where they existed, Smooth AC stations were meant to fill a void for soft music created by the mainstream adult contemporary format's overall move toward more uptempo adult Top-40 musical fare.

One of the first high-profile stations to adopt the Smooth AC approach was pioneering smooth-jazz station KTWV in Los Angeles ("The Wave"), under new program director Jhani Kaye. KTWV's transition was successful in improving the station's 25-54 ratings. Other stations followed suit, including the late WLFM-LP in Chicago; WXJZ in Gainesville, Florida; KIFM in San Diego; and WNWV in Cleveland, which relaunched under its former "107-3 The Wave" identity as a Smooth AC on January 4, 2012. However, the Smooth AC format for the most part did not succeed: WLFM, WXJZ and KIFM have switched to other formats, WNWV has evolved back into smooth jazz, and KTWV has continued to progressively downplay (while not entirely eliminating) instrumental music in its shift to a "Smooth R&B" Urban AC format. The Smooth AC format is now virtually extinct on commercial radio.

Other former smooth-jazz stations have evolved to Rhythmic Oldies formats while maintaining their previous call letters, notably KOAS in Las Vegas, which saw its ratings in the 25-54 age demographics improve after moving to its "old school" format. KYOT-FM in Phoenix tried the same but has since switched to another format.

=== Non-commercial and AM stations ===
By 2009, as smooth jazz continued its rapid decline on the commercial radio airwaves, a growing number of non-commercial stations (including some LPFMs) have taken up the music and added it to their programming. Among non-commercial stations playing primarily smooth jazz as of June 2016 include: KJZT-LP in Tulsa, Oklahoma; KRWV-LP in Gold Canyon, Arizona; KWBR-LP in St. George, Utah; WNOZ-LP in New Orleans; WAJH in Birmingham, Alabama; WCRX-LP in Columbus, Ohio; WFSK in Nashville, Tennessee; and WBWH-LP in Bluffton, Ohio, which has extended its Sunday-night show "The Chillout Sessions" (featuring a mix of smooth jazz, smooth vocals, and chill music, hosted by Donald Isaac) into its primary format as of October 2011. In addition, some commercial stations which present the format on their HD side channels, such as KKCW in Portland, Oregon, and WDZH in Detroit, do so without or with limited commercial interruption.

One of the longest-running non-commercial smooth jazz radio programs in the United States was "The Quiet Storm," which aired weekly on the community-based WGDR in Plainfield, Vermont and its sister station, WGDH in Hardwick, Vermont, both owned by Goddard College. Launched in 1998 and hosted by Skeeter Sanders, "The Quiet Storm" was a 50-50 mix of smooth jazz and soft R&B, presented in "Triple-A" (Album Adult Alternative) style, with a strong emphasis on "B" and "C" album tracks that most commercial stations often ignore. The show took its name from the early-evening program pioneered in 1976 by WHUR-FM in Washington, D.C. and duplicated with great success as a 24-hour format from 1979 to 2012 by KBLX-FM in San Francisco. WGDR's "Quiet Storm" was one of the station's most popular music programs, based on a 2010 listener survey, and was the only program of its kind on the air in northern New England. In September 2011, a syndicated version of Sanders' program began broadcasting on the Internet-only Fishbowl Radio Network and ran for three years, until November 2014. In January 2015, the program began streaming on the Minneapolis-based SsassyRadio.com, and expanded to the Boston-based internet station WJMX SmoothJazzBoston.com in September 2016 (SsassyRadio canceled the program in January 2017 after two years). In November 2017, the program began broadcasting on a third Vermont station, WBTV-LP in Burlington. It was also syndicated to terrestrial radio stations across the United States affiliated with the Pacifica Radio Network. Sanders continued to produce new episodes up until shortly before his death in 2019.

In some markets, the smooth jazz format has also found a new home on the AM dial. The format had brief comebacks on the AM dial in Reno, Nevada, Phoenix, Arizona (nights and weekends), and Atlanta, Georgia (the latter during weekends only). Among the markets featuring full-time AM smooth jazz outlets are Seattle, Washington (KZIZ 1560 AM) and Philadelphia, Pennsylvania (WDAS 1480 AM, simulcasting WUMR 106.1 FM HD2). In Detroit, Michigan, WMUZ 1200 AM (with a translator on 99.9 FM) also programs smooth jazz during the evening and overnight hours.

=== Specialty shows ===
It is not uncommon for adult contemporary music or urban AC stations to devote some of their weekend programming to the format in an effort to serve a niche market without devoting an entire station to it. Some examples include WRRM Warm 98 in Cincinnati, WZUN-FM in Syracuse, New York, KVIL in Dallas, Texas, WMXC in Mobile, Alabama, and WSOL in Jacksonville, Florida. An oddity in this category is WLAV in Grand Rapids, Michigan, a classic rock station which features a "cool jazz" brunch show on Sunday mornings. WZTK in Burlington, North Carolina, a former talk station which switched in 2012 to regional Mexican programming, also formerly devoted most of its weekend programming to smooth jazz, using programming provided by Dial Global and playing much of the library from the now-defunct Jones Radio Network Smooth Jazz format.

=== Syndicated shows ===
In January 2007, Broadcast Architecture launched the satellite-delivered Smooth Jazz Network, featuring smooth jazz artists Dave Koz, Kenny G, Norman Brown, Brian Culbertson, Paul Hardcastle and Ramsey Lewis as on-air hosts. The network soon spread to 25 markets across the US, with among its more notable affiliates including WJCD in Norfolk, Virginia; WJZL in Lansing, Michigan; WQJZ in Ocean Pines, Maryland; KJZS in Reno, Nevada; WKYL in Lexington, Kentucky; KORL-FM in Honolulu, Hawaii; WAEG in Augusta, Georgia; and WAUN-FM in Green Bay, Wisconsin. WLFM-LP in Chicago also began as a 100% satellite-fed Broadcast Architecture affiliate, but soon went to mainly local programming during weekdays with the satellite feed filling most of the remainder of the schedule. Of these stations, only WAEG remains an affiliate of the Smooth Jazz Network as of June 2016. The list of remaining over-the-air affiliates also includes KZIZ in Seattle, WCHB-AM-FM (part-time) in Detroit, and KWDR in Kennewick, Washington, as well as HD Radio side channels in various markets, including San Francisco, Washington, Miami, Baltimore, Houston, Nashville, Memphis, St. Louis, San Antonio, and Grand Rapids, Michigan. It is also available for streaming via iHeartMedia's iHeartRadio application.

In response to the late 2000s trend toward Smooth AC, Broadcast Architecture also for a time marketed a Smooth AC Network (formerly named "Chillout Radio Network", despite the lack of so-called chill music in the network's playlist, and then renamed "Bright Radio Network" before the final name change to "Smooth AC") featuring the same air talent as the Smooth Jazz Network. This network had only a handful of affiliates at its peak and has since been discontinued.

The current air talent lineup on the Smooth Jazz Network includes Kenny G and Sandy Kovach (formerly of WVMV "V98.7" Detroit) mornings, Miranda Wilson middays, Allan Kepler during afternoon drive, and Maria Lopez evenings and overnights, with weekend personalities including Norman Brown, Paul Hardcastle, and Allan Kepler's Smooth Jazz Top 20 Countdown. Top-selling saxophonist Dave Koz was a former air personality on the Smooth Jazz and Smooth AC networks.

Other weekly syndicated smooth jazz radio shows include the long running Art Good's Jazztrax, "Chill" with saxophonist Mindi Abair, Ramsey Lewis' "Legends Of Jazz" and the weekly two-hour Dave Koz Radio Show. In the summer of 2007, Broadcast Architecture launched the format's first ever national countdown show, the "Smooth Jazz Top 20 Countdown with Allen Kepler". The Smooth Jazz Top 20 now airs in more than 20 radio stations.

Elements of the smooth jazz format are also present in the Timeless Cool format distributed by Timeless Cool Music, Inc., which features a mixture of smooth and traditional jazz with adult standards by artists like Ray Charles, Madeleine Peyroux, and Bobby Darin and adult alternative performers such as Jack Johnson, Amy Winehouse, and Annie Lennox. However, this format has failed to take off and is as of August 2011 aired on only a small handful of stations nationwide.

Until September 30, 2008, Jones Radio Networks also distributed a smooth-jazz format via satellite. This network was discontinued following Jones Radio Networks' purchase by Triton Media Group, owners of the Dial Global stable of 24/7 formats, and Triton's decision to eliminate Smooth Jazz from its portfolio. Jones' Smooth Jazz network had dwindled to only a handful of affiliates at the time the format was discontinued; most of the remaining Jones stations (i.e. WJZL Lansing, Michigan and WQJZ Ocean City, Maryland) were switched over to Broadcast Architecture's network.

=== Smooth jazz radio ===
The smooth-jazz format was always less common in Canada, where cultural differences, fewer large urban markets and fewer CanCon-friendly smooth jazz acts made the format less attractive to station owners. By August 2012, the format became completely extinct as a full-time offering on the Canadian airwaves; in 2011, Canada's two remaining high-profile Anglophone smooth jazz stations both flipped to different formats, with CIWV-FM in Hamilton flipping to country music in August 2011 as CHKX-FM (albeit continuing its previous Wave format as an internet radio station, Wave.fm), CJGV-FM in Winnipeg dropping its "Groove" format on December 1, 2011 and flipping to adult contemporary after the Christmas season.

In August 2012, French-language station CKLX-FM in Montreal dropped its Planète Jazz branding and relaunched as talk radio CHOI Radio X (modeled after Quebec City sister station CHOI-FM); for licensing reasons, the station continued to carry jazz as a part-time format in off-peak dayparts until 2014, when the CRTC relieved the station of its obligation to carry jazz music. In 2021, CHKX owner Durham Radio reached an agreement to acquire CIRH-FM in Vancouver, which it then re-launched in 2022 with a smooth AC format as Wave 98.3. CIWV is the first jazz station in Vancouver after the 1985 demise of CJAZ, a traditional jazz formatted station, the first in Canada, in 1985.

New material from the UK, Europe and Australia has largely failed to gain airplay in the US. Well–financed and often government-funded radio organisations in the UK, Europe and Australia, coupled with technical developments in the digital radio field, have led to the launch of a number of smooth jazz radio stations in these markets and their playlists are substantially more diverse than in the US.

In the UK however, the only radio station that regularly played smooth jazz was 102.2 Jazz FM in London and 100.4 Jazz FM in the North West. Upon takeover by the Guardian Media Group in 2003, the station started to create playlists predominantly consisting of easy listening soul and pop. Finally, in March 2004 in the North West and in June 2005 in London, the station changed its name to Smooth FM, and dropped smooth jazz from its playlists altogether. At the same time, GMG launched jazzfm.com in some parts of the UK which after closing in some areas. However, as part of its relaunch, smooth jazz and funk has also been played alongside more mainstream and traditional jazz output as played by former UK jazz station theJazz. On October 6, 2008 jazzfm.com was relaunched under a three-year deal with The Local Radio Company to relaunch Jazz FM initially with smooth jazz output in the daytime and early hours of the morning, however, smooth jazz output has since been dropped from the schedule as of September 2012.

== List of Smooth Jazz and Smooth AC radio stations ==
=== United States (excluding HD side channels) ===
- KOAZ/1510: "103.7 The Oasis",Isleta, New Mexico (translator K279BP on 103.7 FM, Albuquerque, New Mexico)
- KRWV-LP/99.3: "99.3 The Wave", Gold Canyon, Arizona
- KWBR-LP/105.7: "Smooth Jazz 105.7", St. George, Utah
- WAEG/92.3: "Smooth Jazz 92.3", Evans, Georgia (Broadcast Architecture affiliate)
- WBWH-LP/96.1: "Smooth 96.1", Bluffton, Ohio - Primary
- WEIB/106.3: "106.3 Smooth FM", Northampton, Massachusetts - Smooth Jazz/Smooth AC/Urban AC hybrid
- WFSK-FM/88.1: Nashville, Tennessee
- KJZT-LP/90.1: "Jazz Tulsa", Tulsa, Oklahoma
- WSBZ/106.3: "Seabreeze 106.3", Miramar Beach, Florida
- WAJH/91.1: "Jazz Hall Radio", Birmingham, Alabama
- WSIE-FM/88.7: Edwardsville, Illinois
- WCLK-FM/91.9: "Jazz 91.9" Atlanta, Georgia - Smooth/Classic Jazz
- WWWE/WNSY/1310/100.1: "Smooth Jazz 101.1/100.1", Decatur, Georgia/Talking Rock, Georgia (translator W266BW on 101.1 FM, Winder, Georgia)
- WNOZ-LP/95.3: New Orleans, Louisiana
- WJZK-LP/97.3: "Smooth 97.3 The Bay", Fort Walton Beach, Florida
- WTTZ-LP/93.5: "The Maryland Transportation Channel", Baltimore, Maryland
- WJTI/1460: "100.7 The Wave", West Allis, Wisconsin (translator W273DQ on 102.5 FM, Milwaukee, Wisconsin)
- WDJZ/1590: South Daytona, Florida (translator W264DP on 100.7 FM, Daytona Beach, Florida)

=== Canada (excluding HD side channels) ===
- CIWV-FM/98.3: Vancouver, British Columbia

=== Cable/satellite/subscription ===
- City Lights (Mood Media - instrumentals only)
- Impressions (Mood Media - instrumentals and vocals)
- Smooth Jazz (iHeartRadio)
- Smooth Jazz (LiveXLive) Free with ads/premium ad free
- Smooth Jazz (Music Choice)
- Smooth Jazz (Stingray Music)
- Watercolors (SiriusXM)
