= List of jazz radio stations in the United States =

This is a list of terrestrial, satellite and internet radio stations which identify themselves as playing jazz in any of its forms (mainstream, traditional, fusion, acid, and smooth, among others), or have substantial jazz programming, that can be heard in the United States.

Call sign	Frequency	City	State	Licensed to/operated by
KAZI	88.7 FM	Austin	Texas	Austin Community Radio, Inc.
KBCU	88.1 FM	North Newton	Kansas	Bethel College
KBEM-FM	88.5 FM	Minneapolis	Minnesota	Minneapolis Public Schools
KBSK	89.9 FM	McCall	Idaho	Boise State University
KBSU-HD2	90.3-2 FM	Boise	Idaho	Boise State University
KCCK-FM	88.3 FM	Cedar Rapids	Iowa	Kirkwood Community College
KCME-HD2	88.7-2 FM	Colorado Springs	Colorado	Cheyenne Mountain Public Broadcast House, Inc.
KCSM	91.1 FM	San Mateo	California	San Mateo County Community College District
KCYI-LP	97.7 FM	Oklahoma City	Oklahoma	Edwards Broadcasting
KDKI-LP	103.9 FM	Twin Falls	Idaho	Tamarack Community Broadcasting Inc.
KEWU-FM	89.5 FM	Cheney	Washington	Eastern Washington University
KJEM	89.9 FM	Pullman	Washington	Washington State University
KJLU	88.9 FM	Jefferson City	Missouri	Lincoln University of Missouri
KJZA	89.5 FM	Drake	Arizona	K-Jazz Radio Network
KJZX-LP	89.1 FM	Austin	Texas	Jazz ATX, Inc.
KKJZ	88.1 FM	Long Beach	California	California State University, Long Beach
KMHD	89.1 FM	Gresham	Oregon	Mt. Hood Community College
KNKX-HD2	88.5 FM	Tacoma	Washington	Friends of 88.5 (Community ownership)
KNTU-HD2	88.1-2 FM	McKinney	Texas	University of North Texas
KOJH-LP	104.7 FM	Kansas City	Missouri	Mutual Musicians Foundation, Inc.
KRTU-FM	91.7 FM	San Antonio	Texas	Trinity University
KRWV-LP	99.3 FM	Gold Canyon	Arizona	Gold Canyon Public Radio Inc.
KSBR	88.5 FM	Mission Viejo	California	Saddleback College
KSDS	88.3 FM	San Diego	California	San Diego Community College District; San Diego City College
KTSU	90.9 FM	Houston	Texas	Texas Southern University
KUAZ-HD2	89.1-2 FM	Tucson	Arizona	University of Arizona
KUNV	91.5 FM	Las Vegas	Nevada	University of Nevada, Las Vegas
KUVO	89.3 FM	Denver	Colorado	Rocky Mountain Public Media, Inc.
KUWL	90.1 FM	Laramie	Wyoming	University of Wyoming
KWBR-LP	105.7 FM	St. George	Utah	Association of Community Resources and News
KWGS-HD2	89.5-2 FM	Tulsa	Oklahoma	University of Tulsa
WAEG	92.3 FM	Evans	Georgia	Perry Broadcasting
WAJH	91.1 FM	Birmingham	Alabama	Alabama Jazz Hall of Fame
WBGO	88.3 FM	Newark	New Jersey	Newark Public Radio
WBLV	90.3 FM	Twin Lake	Michigan	Blue Lake Fine Arts Camp
WBRH	90.3 FM	Baton Rouge	Louisiana	East Baton Rouge Parish Public Schools; Baton Rouge Magnet High School
WCLK	91.9 FM	Atlanta	Georgia	Clark Atlanta University
WCLV-HD2	90.3-2 FM	Cleveland	Ohio	Ideastream
WCSB	89.3 FM	Cleveland	Ohio	Cleveland State University, Ideastream
WDCB	90.9 FM	Glen Ellyn	Illinois	College of DuPage, District No. 502
WDNA	88.9 FM	Miami	Florida	Bascomb Memorial Broadcasting Foundation
WDPS	89.5 FM	Dayton	Ohio	Dayton Public Schools & Ponitz Career Technology Center
WEAA	88.9 FM	Baltimore	Maryland	Morgan State University
WEMU	89.1 FM	Ypsilanti	Michigan	Eastern Michigan University
WESM	91.3 FM	Princess Anne	Maryland	University of Maryland Eastern Shore
WETF-LP	105.7 FM	South Bend	Indiana	Latino Task Force For Education Inc.
WGMC	90.1 FM	Greece	New York	Greece Central School District; Greece Olympia High School
WGUC-HD2	90.9-2 FM	Cincinnati	Ohio	Cincinnati Public Radio, Inc.
WHRO-HD2	90.3-2 FM	Norfolk	Virginia	Hampton Roads Educational Telecommunications Association
WICN	90.5 FM	Worcester	Massachusetts	WICN Public Radio
WICR	88.7 FM	Indianapolis	Indiana	University of Indianapolis
WIPR-HD2	91.3-2 FM	San Juan	Puerto Rico	Puerto Rico Public Broadcasting Corporation
WJAB	90.9 FM	Huntsville	Alabama	Alabama A&M University
WJAZ	91.7 FM	Summerdale, Harrisburg	Pennsylvania	Temple University
WJSU-FM	88.5 FM	Jackson	Mississippi	Jackson State University
WJZP-LP	105.1 FM	Portland	Maine	All Inclusive
WMKV	89.3 FM	Reading	Ohio	Maple Knoll Communities
WMOT-HD2	89.5-2 FM	Murfreesboro	Tennessee	Middle Tennessee State University
WNCU	90.7 FM	Durham	North Carolina	North Carolina Central University
WPFW	89.3 FM	Washington, D.C.	District of Columbia	Pacifica Foundation
WQJC-LP	107.9 FM	Quincy	Illinois	Quincy Not For Profit Jazz Corp.
WRCJ-FM	90.9 FM	Detroit	Michigan	Detroit Classical & Jazz Educational Radio
WRTI	90.1 FM	Philadelphia	Pennsylvania	Temple University
WRTJ	89.3 FM	Coatesville	Pennsylvania	Temple University
WRTL	90.7 FM	Ephrata, Lancaster	Pennsylvania	Temple University
WRTQ	91.3 FM	Ocean City, Atlantic City	New Jersey	Temple University
WRTX	91.7 FM	Dover	Delaware	Temple University
WRTY	91.1 FM	Jackson Township, Mount Pocono	Pennsylvania	Temple University
WSAX-LP	98.5 FM	Columbus	Ohio	SEMM Foundation
WSBZ	106.3 FM	Miramar Beach	Florida	Carter Broadcasting, Inc.
WSIE	88.7 FM	Edwardsville	Illinois	Board of Trustees, Southern Illinois University; Southern Illinois University Edwardsville
WSNC	90.5 FM	Winston-Salem	North Carolina	Winston-Salem State University
WTTZ-LP	93.5 FM	Baltimore	Maryland	Maryland Department of Transportation
WTUS-LP	103.3 FM	Tuscaloosa	Alabama	Tuscaloosa City Schools
WUCF-FM	89.9 FM	Orlando	Florida	University of Central Florida
WUSF	89.7 FM	Tampa	Florida	University of South Florida
WVAS	90.7 FM	Montgomery	Alabama	Alabama State University
WVIA-HD3	89.9-3 FM	Pittston	Pennsylvania	WVIA-FM
WVID	90.3 FM	Añasco	Puerto Rico	Centro Colegial Cristiano
WVST-FM	91.3 FM	Petersburg	Virginia	Virginia State University
WWNO-HD3	89.9-3 FM	New Orleans	Louisiana	LSU New Orleans
WWOZ	90.7 FM	New Orleans	Louisiana	New Orleans Jazz & Heritage Foundation
WXTS-FM	88.3 FM	Toledo	Ohio	Toledo Public Schools
WYAR	88.3 FM	Yarmouth	Maine	Heritage Radio Society, Inc.
WZUM	1550 AM	Braddock	Pennsylvania	Pittsburgh Public Media
WZUM-FM	88.1 FM	Bethany	West Virginia	Pittsburgh Public Media

== Satellite ==
- Real Jazz (SiriusXM)
- Watercolors (Sirius XM)
