= WBTV (disambiguation) =

WBTV is a CBS television affiliate in Charlotte, North Carolina.

WBTV may also refer to:

- The WB, a defunct television network in the United States
- WBTV: The Warner Channel UK, an unrealised satellite channel in the United Kingdom
- Warner TV, a cable and satellite channel that also goes by "WBTV"
- Warner Bros. Television Studios, a television production and distribution company
- WBTV-LP, a low-power radio station (99.3 FM) licensed to serve Burlington, Vermont, United States
