= Bay FM =

Bay FM is the on-air name used by four unconnected Australian radio stations:

- Bay FM (Byron Bay): a community radio station in Byron Bay, New South Wales
- 93.9 Bay FM: an adult contemporary-formatted commercial radio station in Geelong, Victoria
- Bay FM 99.3: a classic hits-formatted narrowcast radio station in Nelson Bay, New South Wales
- Bay FM (Brisbane): a community radio station in Brisbane, Queensland

Bay FM is also used as an on-air call-sign for other radio stations throughout the world:

- Japan: BAY-FM (Chiba, Japan), or JOGV-FM, a radio station in Chiba City
- Malta: 897 Bay FM Malta (89.7 FM)
- South Africa: Bay FM 107.9, a community radio station base in Port Elizabeth
- United Kingdom: Bay FM Exmouth in Exmouth, Devon
- Canada: CKVB-FM (100.1 FM) in Corner Brook, Newfoundland, Canada; it is a community radio station that goes by 100.1 BayFM
- New Zealand : BayFM 100.7, a private radio station broadcasting from Hastings, Hawkes Bay. playing 70's, 80's and adult contemporary
