= KLOR =

KLOR may refer to:

- KLOR-FM, a radio station (99.3 FM) licensed to Ponca City, Oklahoma, United States
- Lowe Army Heliport
- KLOR-TV, a television station licensed to Portland, Oregon, United States, merged into KPTV in 1957
- KBYU-TV, a television station licensed to Provo, Utah, United States, which held the call sign KLOR-TV from 1958 to 1962
