= Eagle Township, Ohio =

Eagle Township, Ohio, may refer to:

- Eagle Township, Brown County, Ohio
- Eagle Township, Hancock County, Ohio
- Eagle Township, Vinton County, Ohio
