= WXRA (disambiguation) =

WXRA refers to the following broadcasting stations in the United States:

- WXRA, a radio station (FM 99.3 MHz) licensed to Inglis, Florida
- WUFO, a radio station (AM 1080 kHz) licensed to Amherst, New York, which held the call sign WXRA from 1948 to 1957
- WMAL-FM, a radio station (FM 105.9 MHz) licensed to Woodbridge, Virginia, which held the call sign WXRA from 1962 to 1981
- WWWT-FM, a radio station (FM 107.7 MHz) licensed to Manassas, Virginia, which held the call sign WXRA from 1981 to 1982
- WTLA, a radio station (AM 1200 kHz) licensed to North Syracuse, New York, which held the call sign WXRA from 1988 to 1991
- WPTI, a radio station (FM 94.5 MHz) licensed to Eden, North Carolina, which held the call sign WXRA from 1994 to 2001
- WWTF, a radio station (AM 1580 kHz) licensed to Georgetown, Kentucky, which held the call sign WXRA from 2002 to 2008
