= WVSU =

WVSU may refer to:

- West Virginia State University, located in Institute, West Virginia, United States
- West Visayas State University, located in Iloilo City, Philippines
- WAJH, a radio station (91.1 FM) licensed to serve Birmingham, Alabama, United States, which held the call sign WVSU-FM from 1978 to 2018
