= Union Township, Hancock County, Ohio =

Township in Ohio, US

- Township
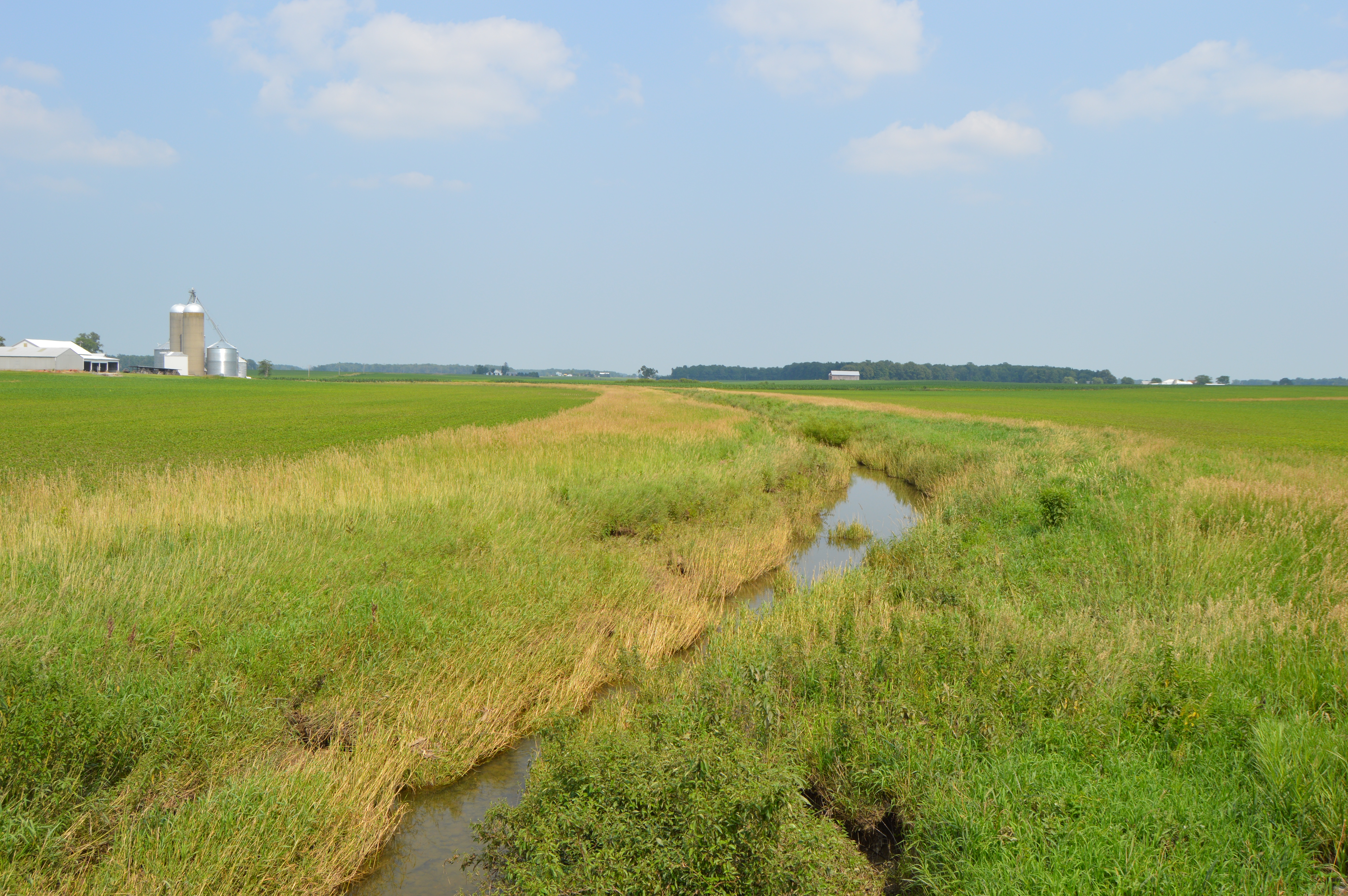
- Ottawa Creek south of Rawson

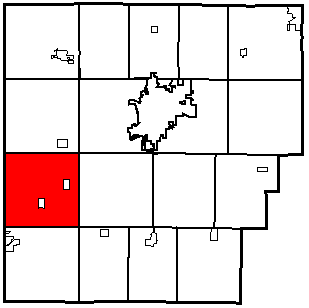
- Location of Union Township in Hancock County
- Coordinates: 40°56′52″N 83°48′47″W
- Country: United States
- State: Ohio
- County: Hancock

Area
  - Total: 35.6 sq mi (92.3 km^{2})
  - Land: 35.6 sq mi (92.2 km^{2})
  - Water: 0.039 sq mi (0.1 km^{2})
- Elevation: 820 ft (250 m)

Population (2020)
  - Total: 1,881
  - Density: 52.8/sq mi (20.4/km^{2})
- Time zone: UTC-5 (Eastern (EST))
  - Summer (DST): UTC-4 (EDT)
- FIPS code: 39-78330
- GNIS feature ID: 1086253

Union Township is one of the seventeen townships of Hancock County, Ohio, United States. As of the 2020 census, the population was 1,881.

== Geography ==
Located in the western part of the county, it borders the following townships:

- Blanchard Township - north
- Liberty Township - northeast corner
- Eagle Township - east
- Van Buren Township - southeast corner
- Orange Township - south
- Richland Township, Allen County - southwest
- Riley Township, Putnam County - west
- Blanchard Township, Putnam County - northwest corner

Two villages are located in Union Township: Mount Cory in the south, and Rawson in the east.

== Name and history ==
It is one of twenty-seven Union Townships statewide.

Union Township was organized in 1832.

== Government ==
The township is governed by a three-member board of trustees, who are elected in November of odd-numbered years to a four-year term beginning on the following January 1. Two are elected in the year after the presidential election and one is elected in the year before it. There is also an elected township fiscal officer, who serves a four-year term beginning on April 1 of the year after the election, which is held in November of the year before the presidential election. Vacancies in the fiscal officership or on the board of trustees are filled by the remaining trustees.
