= CFOR =

CFOR can mean:

- CFOR-FM, a Canadian radio station
- CICX-FM, a Canadian radio station formerly known as CFOR
- Conservative Friends of Russia, a UK political interest group
