= Bluffton Airport =

- IATA: none; ICAO: none; FAA LID: 5G7

Summary
- Airport type: Public
- Owner: Village of Bluffton
- Serves: Bluffton, Ohio
- Time zone: UTC−05:00 (-5)
  - Summer (DST): UTC−04:00 (-4)
- Elevation AMSL: 851 ft (259 m)
- Coordinates: 40°53′08″N 083°52′07″W

Map
- Location of airport in Ohio 5G7 (the United States)

Runways
Direction	Length		Surface
Direction	ft	m	Surface
5/23	4,126	1,258	Asphalt

Statistics (2022)
- Aircraft operations: 42,705
- Based aircraft: 19
- Source: Federal Aviation Administration

Bluffton Airport (FAA LID: 5G7) is a public use airport located one nautical mile (1.85 km) southeast of the central business district of Bluffton, in Hancock County, Ohio, United States. It is owned by the Village of Bluffton. According to the FAA's National Plan of Integrated Airport Systems for 2009–2013, it is categorized as a general aviation facility.

== History ==
Efforts to build an airport in Bluffton began as early as January 1944, when such a facility was proposed during two local club meetings by Clayton Bixel, an automobile dealer. Promoted as a way for returning servicemen to take advantage of their G.I. Bill benefits to learn to fly, work on the 80-acre (32 ha) field 1.5 miles (2.4 km) miles east of the city had begun by late July 1946. Plans called for the field to be opened a couple weeks after a 5,400-square-foot (500 m^{2}) hangar had been completed. The airport was officially dedicated on 5 July 1948 as part of Independence Day celebrations.

In 1958, a proposal was made by a businessmen's association to build one airport to serve Allen, Hancock, Hardin and Putnam counties. However, a bond issue to fund the idea was defeated at the polls in November. In late January 1965, the Bluffton Flying Service purchased 16 acres (6.5 ha) of land on the western border of the airport that had been separated from the remainder of a farm by the construction of I-75.

The airport received a state grant in March 1968 to build a 3,600-by-75-foot (1,097 m × 23 m) paved runway. A contract was awarded the following month. By late November 1969, a proposal had been made to create an industrial park on 500 acres (200 ha) of land surrounding the airport. The airport received an additional state grant in June 1971 to extend the runway to 4,200 feet (1,300 m). Construction on a two floor terminal with four service bays had begun by mid February 1972.

The airport received a federal grant to purchase 84 acres (34 ha) of land to lengthen the runway in September 1988.

A federal grant received in September 1994 paid for the relocation of a road at the end of the runway.

It was announced in September 1998 that Life Flight would be basing a helicopter at the airport starting the following month.

Approval was given by the city in August 2001 to purchase 2 acres (0.81 ha) of land to remove trees that were runway obstructions. The following May, council was in the process of accepting a bid to repave the runway.

The terminal was named for Dottie J. Anderson, a local pioneering female pilot, in 2017.

The airport received a federal grant to repave three taxiways in 2022.

=== Grob factory ===
In June 1982, the German manufacturer Grob Aircraft relocated the American subsidiary of their company from Spring Valley, New York to a building previously owned by Bixel Motor Sales. (Note: The building had been under construction by June 1976.) At the same time, it announced bidding had begun on construction of a facility to produce aircraft on 139 acres (56 ha) adjacent to the airport. However, nearly four years later, assembly of the company's G 115 airplane in the 18,000-square-foot (1,700 m^{2}) service center was still being planned.

Grob opened a 50,000-square-foot (4,600 m^{2}) machine tool plant on land next to the airport in October 1991. The factory expanded to 115,000-square-foot (10,700 m^{2}) in 1995. The company announced plans for a 46,365-square-foot (4,307.4 m^{2}) expansion in February 2012. A 90,000-square-foot (8,400 m^{2}) addition was under construction in 2014. Work on a new 45,918-square-foot (4,265.9 m^{2}) engineering and sales building was underway in January 2019. It broke ground on a 135,000-square-foot (12,500 m^{2}) expansion in December 2023.

== Facilities and aircraft ==
Bluffton Airport covers an area of 100 acres (40 ha) at an elevation of 851 feet (259 m) above mean sea level. It has one runway designated 5/23 with an asphalt surface measuring 4,126 by 75 feet (1,258 x 23 m).

For the 12-month period ending August 11, 2022, the airport had 42,705 aircraft operations, an average of 117 per day. It includes 93% general aviation, 7% air taxi, and <1% military. For the same time period, 19 aircraft were based at the airport: 18 single-engine airplanes and 1 helicopter. These numbers are down from 71,980 movements and 24 based aircraft in 2008.

The airport has a fixed-base operator that sells fuel, including both avgas and jet fuel. Limited services are available.

The airport received $90,000 from the Federal Aviation Administration in 2022 to rebuild three taxiways.

== Accidents and incidents ==
- On 23 August 1979, a Piper Navajo crashed while attempting to land at the airport, killing the pilot.
- On 4 October 1982, a Beechcraft Baron crashed while landing at the airport, injuring the four occupants. The pilot had mistakenly believed he was landing at the Putnam County Airport.
- On July 30, 2000, a Piper PA-24 impacted terrain while on approach to the Bluffton Airport. An airport employee who witnessed the accident said the pilot had made calls inquiring which runway was in use while on approach to the airport. Soon after, a van pulled up to inform the employee that the aircraft had crashed; there had been no distress call. Another witness reported that they had seen the aircraft approaching the airport when it had abruptly banked right and entered a vertical dive from an altitude of 300-500 feet, which they determined was too low for the aircraft's position on the approach. The probable cause of the accident was found to be the pilot's improper fuel calculations, which resulted in fuel exhaustion, as well as his abrupt maneuver during a forced landing, which resulted in an inadvertent stall.
- On August 3, 2002, a Piper PA-32 Cherokee Six was substantially damaged during a forced landing near the Bluffton Airport. After flying into another airport the day before and getting fuel, the pilot noticed that the fuel gauge for the right outboard tank indicated empty and the gauge for the right main tank indicated approximately 2/3. The pilot proceeded with a normal runup and found no anomalies; at that point, the fuel gauges indicated full. After a number of flights during the day, while on his last approach into Bluffton, the engine began running rough and subsequently died. The pilot selected a different fuel tank and made several unsuccessful attempts to troubleshoot the problem and restart the engine. He activated the lights for the airport, and turned directly towards the runway, but he subsequently decided he did not have enough altitude to make it to the airport and landed in a soybean field. All but one fuel tank were found to be at least 3/4 full, and the pilot reported he had used different fuel tanks on each of his three flights that day. The probable cause of the accident was found to be the pilot's fuel mismanagement with his failure to position the fuel selector to the proper tank which resulted in engine fuel starvation.
- On December 27, 2003, a Cessna 172R Skyhawk was substantially damaged while landing at the Bluffton Airport. The pilot reported that, during landing, the airplane was hit by an "unexpected wind gust." The airplane was lifted upward and then impacted the runway "very hard." The airplane then bounced and came to rest on the nose wheel first, causing the landing gear strut to bend and the propeller to impact the runway. The probable cause of the accident was found to be the pilot's improper flare and inadequate recovery from a bounced landing.
- On August 6, 2009, a Cessna 172S Skyhawk was damaged on landing at the Bluffton Airport. The airplane experienced a hard landing after encountering a gust of wind just prior to the landing flare during a student solo flight. The student pilot reported that, during the touchdown, the left main landing gear and nose landing gear impacted the runway. Unknown that the airplane was damaged, the student pilot executed a touch-and-go and flew the airplane back to his home airport. The probable cause of the accident was found to be the student pilot's failure to compensate for wind conditions and maintain aircraft control during the landing.
- On June 13, 2022, a Cessna 172 Skyhawk crashed just south of the Bluffton Airport. The pilot lost control of the aircraft, crashed into a field nose first, and flipped over.

== See also ==
- List of airports in Ohio
