= WJZP-LP =

- Portland, Maine; United States
- Frequency: 107.9 FM
- Branding: Jazz 107.9

Programming
- Format: Jazz

Ownership
- Owner: All Inclusive, Inc.

History
- First air date: April 5, 2005
- Former frequencies: 105.1 FM (2005–2015)
- Call sign meaning: Jazz Portland

Technical information
- Licensing authority: FCC
- Class: L1
- ERP: 31 watts
- HAAT: 53 meters
- Transmitter coordinates: 43.656944°N 70.263833°W

Links
- Public license information: LMS
- Website: https://www.wjzp.me

WJZP-LP (107.9 FM) is a low-power broadcast radio station in Portland, Maine, United States. The station broadcasts a community-based jazz, classic soul and urban gospel format. The station has been on the air since 2005.

The station plays jazz and classic R&B in the afternoon, and uptempo and dance tracks in the evening.

Dennis Ross, the founder, owner, and operator of WJZP, stated that Portland civil rights leader Gerald Talbot was his inspiration for founding a minority-owned radio station. In 2007, he spoke out at the Federal Communications Commission hearing on media ownership issues in Portland.

== See also ==
- List of jazz radio stations in the United States
- List of community radio stations in the United States
