= Orange, Ohio (disambiguation) =

Orange, Ohio is a village in Cuyahoga County.

Orange, Ohio may also refer to:

- Orange, Coshocton County, Ohio
- Orange, Delaware County, Ohio

== See also ==
- Orange Township, Ohio (disambiguation)
