= Bluffton, Ohio =

- Village
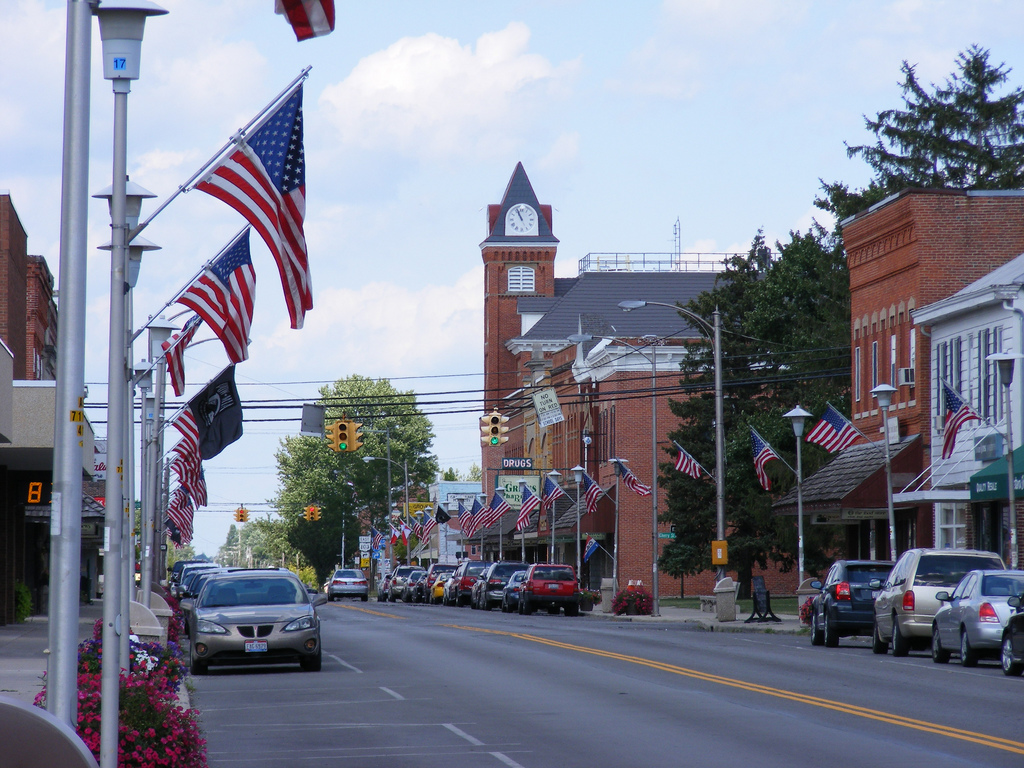
- Main Street in downtown

- Flag logo
- Motto: "150 Years Of Progress"
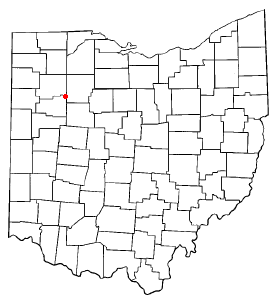
- Location in the state of Ohio

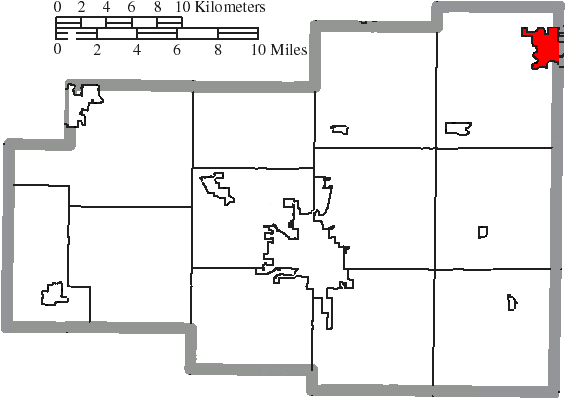
- Location of Bluffton in Allen County
- Coordinates: 40°53′22″N 83°52′45″W
- Country: United States
- State: Ohio
- Counties: Allen, Hancock
- Townships: Richland, Orange
- Established: 1861

Government
  - Mayor: Richard Johnson

Area
  - Total: 3.78 sq mi (9.78 km^{2})
  - Land: 3.69 sq mi (9.57 km^{2})
  - Water: 0.081 sq mi (0.21 km^{2})
- Elevation: 820 ft (250 m)

Population (2020)
  - Total: 3,967
  - Estimate (2023): 3,903
  - Density: 1,073.7/sq mi (414.57/km^{2})
- Time zone: UTC−5 (EST)
  - Summer (DST): UTC−4 (EDT)
- ZIP code: 45817
- Area code: 419, 567
- FIPS code: 39-07426
- GNIS feature ID: 2398144
- Website: www.bluffton-ohio.com

Bluffton, originally known as Shannon, is a village in Allen and Hancock counties in the U.S. state of Ohio. The population was 3,967 at the 2020 census. Bluffton is home to Bluffton University, a four-year educational institution affiliated with Mennonite Church USA. Bluffton is served by the Bluffton general aviation airport. Bluffton participates in the Tree City USA program.

The Allen County portion of Bluffton is part of the Lima, Ohio metropolitan area, while the Hancock County portion is part of the Findlay Micropolitan Statistical Area.

== History ==
The village was founded in 1831 by Swiss Mennonites, German Reformists and Irish Catholics. It was originally named 'Crogan's Corners' after the postmaster. When the citizens chose to incorporate as a village, the Irish suggested the name 'Shannon' because of the green fields around the area. As there was already a village named Shannon in the state, the town was renamed Bluffton for the hilly terrain of the town site.

Bank robber John Dillinger robbed the Bluffton Bank (now known as Citizens National Bank of Bluffton) of $6,000 on August 14, 1933.

In 2011, Bluffton celebrated its 150th birthday with a series of town-wide events.

== Geography ==
According to the United States Census Bureau, the village has a total area of 3.62 square miles (9.38 km^{2}), of which 3.55 square miles (9.19 km^{2}) is land and 0.07 square miles (0.18 km^{2}) is water.

Riley Creek flows through Bluffton.

== Demographics ==
Historical population
Census	Pop.	Note	%±
1870	489		—
1880	1,290		163.8%
1890	1,290		0.0%
1900	1,783		38.2%
1910	1,953		9.5%
1920	1,950		−0.2%
1930	2,035		4.4%
1940	2,077		2.1%
1950	2,423		16.7%
1960	2,591		6.9%
1970	2,935		13.3%
1980	3,310		12.8%
1990	3,367		1.7%
2000	3,896		15.7%
2010	4,125		5.9%
2020	3,967		−3.8%
2023 (est.)	3,903	▼	−1.6%
U.S. Decennial Census

=== 2020 census ===
As of the 2020 census, Bluffton had a population of 3,967. The median age was 38.1 years. 19.9% of residents were under the age of 18 and 21.7% of residents were 65 years of age or older. For every 100 females there were 87.7 males, and for every 100 females age 18 and over there were 87.1 males age 18 and over.

0.0% of residents lived in urban areas, while 100.0% lived in rural areas.

There were 1,430 households in Bluffton, of which 29.6% had children under the age of 18 living in them. Of all households, 52.7% were married-couple households, 14.2% were households with a male householder and no spouse or partner present, and 29.4% were households with a female householder and no spouse or partner present. About 32.8% of all households were made up of individuals and 16.7% had someone living alone who was 65 years of age or older.

There were 1,555 housing units, of which 8.0% were vacant. The homeowner vacancy rate was 1.2% and the rental vacancy rate was 9.3%.

Racial composition as of the 2020 census
Race	Number	Percent
White	3,596	90.6%
Black or African American	98	2.5%
American Indian and Alaska Native	4	0.1%
Asian	37	0.9%
Native Hawaiian and Other Pacific Islander	4	0.1%
Some other race	80	2.0%
Two or more races	148	3.7%
Hispanic or Latino (of any race)	90	2.3%

=== 2010 census ===
As of the census of 2010, there were 4,125 people, 1,428 households, and 913 families living in the village. The population density was 1,162.0 inhabitants per square mile (448.7/km^{2}). There were 1,522 housing units at an average density of 428.7 per square mile (165.5/km^{2}). The racial makeup of the village was 95.3% White, 1.6% African American, 0.2% Native American, 0.9% Asian, 0.8% from other races, and 1.2% from two or more races. Hispanic or Latino of any race were 1.5% of the population.

There were 1,428 households, of which 29.5% had children under the age of 18 living with them, 53.4% were married couples living together, 8.1% had a female householder with no husband present, 2.5% had a male householder with no wife present, and 36.1% were non-families. 33.2% of all households were made up of individuals, and 18.3% had someone living alone who was 65 years of age or older. The average household size was 2.31 and the average family size was 2.95.

The median age in the village was 34 years. 19.9% of residents were under the age of 18; 21.8% were between the ages of 18 and 24; 19.2% were from 25 to 44; 20% were from 45 to 64; and 19% were 65 years of age or older. The gender makeup of the village was 45.6% male and 54.4% female.

=== 2000 census ===
As of the census of 2000, there were 3,896 people, 1,329 households, and 851 families living in the village. The population density was 1,170.2 inhabitants per square mile (451.8/km^{2}). There were 1,427 housing units at an average density of 428.6 per square mile (165.5/km^{2}). The racial makeup of the village was 97.82% White, 0.77% African American, 0.05% Native American, 0.54% Asian, 0.18% from other races, and 0.64% from two or more races. Hispanic or Latino of any race were 1.18% of the population.

There were 1,329 households, out of which 28.3% had children under the age of 18 living with them, 54.3% were married couples living together, 7.3% had a female householder with no husband present, and 35.9% were non-families. 33.1% of all households were made up of individuals, and 18.9% had someone living alone who was 65 years of age or older. The average household size was 2.32 and the average family size was 2.99.

In the village, the population was spread out, with 19.7% under the age of 18, 22.3% from 18 to 24, 21.3% from 25 to 44, 16.8% from 45 to 64, and 20.0% who were 65 years of age or older. The median age was 33 years. For every 100 females there were 76.4 males. For every 100 females age 18 and over, there were 73.4 males.

The median income for a household in the village was $43,208, and the median income for a family was $54,948. Males had a median income of $40,208 versus $21,563 for females. The per capita income for the village was $18,711. About 4.9% of families and 5.7% of the population were below the poverty line, including 3.6% of those under age 18 and 10.6% of those age 65 or over.

== Economy ==
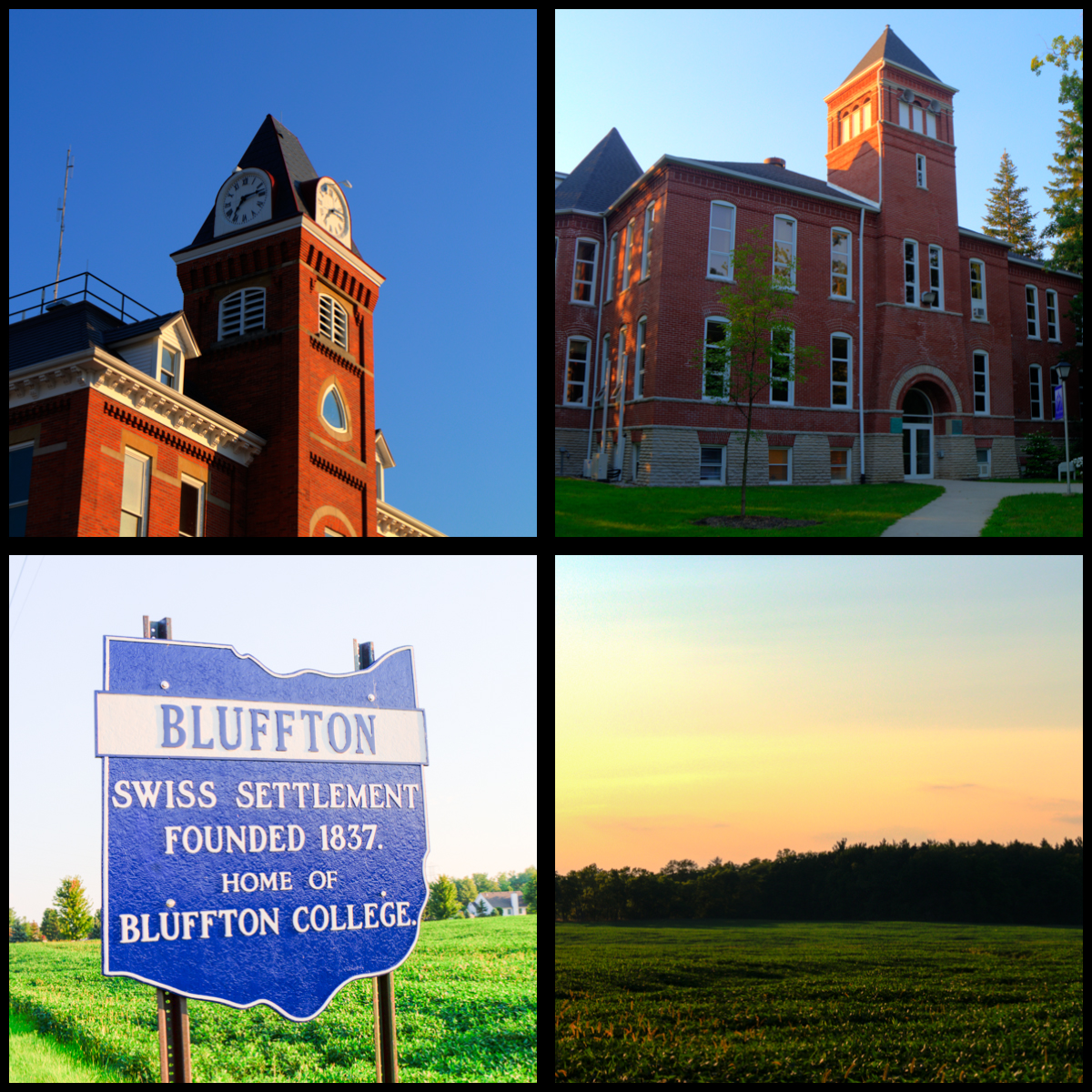
A Collage of Bluffton, Ohio

Bluffton is located approximately halfway between Lima and Findlay in northwest Ohio along Interstate 75.

Modern manufacturing in Bluffton includes the international firm Sumitomo Riko, a cooperative venture between Duramax and Tokai Rubber of Japan, that makes rubber components for the auto industry. GROB Systems, a division of the German company GROB Group, produces machining and automation systems at its plant in Bluffton.

The downtown area is anchored by the 19th century town hall and includes a local farmers market on Saturday mornings from May through October. With an average of 20 vendors, shoppers can choose from local foods and produce, as well as potted herbs, annuals, perennials, shrubs, and trees.

Ten Thousand Villages is a fair-trade retailer that was founded in Bluffton. The shop sells products made by artisans in developing countries.

== Education ==
=== Elementary and secondary ===
Bluffton High School sports participate in the Northwest Conference, an athletic body sanctioned by the Ohio High School Athletic Association (OHSAA) which includes the Ada Bulldogs, Allen East Mustangs, Bluffton Pirates, Columbus Grove Bulldogs, Convoy Crestview Knights, Delphos Jefferson Wildcats, Lincolnview Lancers, Paulding Panthers, and Spencerville Bearcats.

=== Higher education ===
Bluffton is home to Bluffton University, a four-year educational institution affiliated with the Mennonite Church USA.

== Media ==
WBWH-LP (96.1 FM) serves the Bluffton community as its only full-time radio station.

== Infrastructure ==
=== Transportation ===
The Bluffton Airport is located one nautical mile (1.2 mi; 1.9 km) southeast of Bluffton's central business district.

== Notable people ==
- Trevor Bassitt, American sprinter and 2024 Paris Olympics competitor
- Tommy Boutwell, American football player
- Tobias Buckell, science fiction writer
- Larry Cox, Major League baseball player
- D. Michael Crites, United States Attorney for the Southern District of Ohio
- Bob Latta, U.S. representative for Ohio
- James McIntire, Washington state treasurer
- John Travis, doctor and pioneer in the Wellness movement
