= KBCU =

- North Newton, Kansas; United States
- Broadcast area: Harvey County, Kansas
- Frequency: 88.1 MHz

Programming
- Languages: English; Spanish
- Format: Variety
- Affiliations: Pacifica Radio Network

Ownership
- Owner: Bethel College

History
- First air date: 1987
- Call sign meaning: Bethel College

Technical information
- Licensing authority: FCC
- Facility ID: 4987
- Class: A
- ERP: 150 watts
- HAAT: 17.0 meters
- Transmitter coordinates: 38°4′26.00″N 97°20′35.00″W

Links
- Public license information: Public file; LMS
- Webcast: Listen live
- Website: kbcu.bethelks.edu

KBCU (88.1 FM) is non-commercial, educational radio station, broadcasting a Variety and College Radio format from the campus of Bethel College (Kansas) in North Newton, Kansas, and serving the Newton area. The station was founded in the 1930s, and transmits a wide range of student programming, including rock, hip-hop, alternative, Latin, contemporary Christian and sports talk shows, and reaches all of Newton and much of Harvey County.

The radio station is operated and staffed by more than three dozen Bethel students and a faculty advisor, and allows Bethel College students to receive academic credit for their radio participation. There are facilities for broadcast and production for students, providing them with real-world experience which was the first mass-media broadcast experience for many Bethel alumni who went on to careers in mass media and broadcasting.

KBCU is affiliated with the Pacifica Radio Network.

== See also ==
- Campus radio
- List of college radio stations in the United States
- List of jazz radio stations in the United States
