= Richland Township, Allen County, Ohio =

Township in Ohio, US

- Township
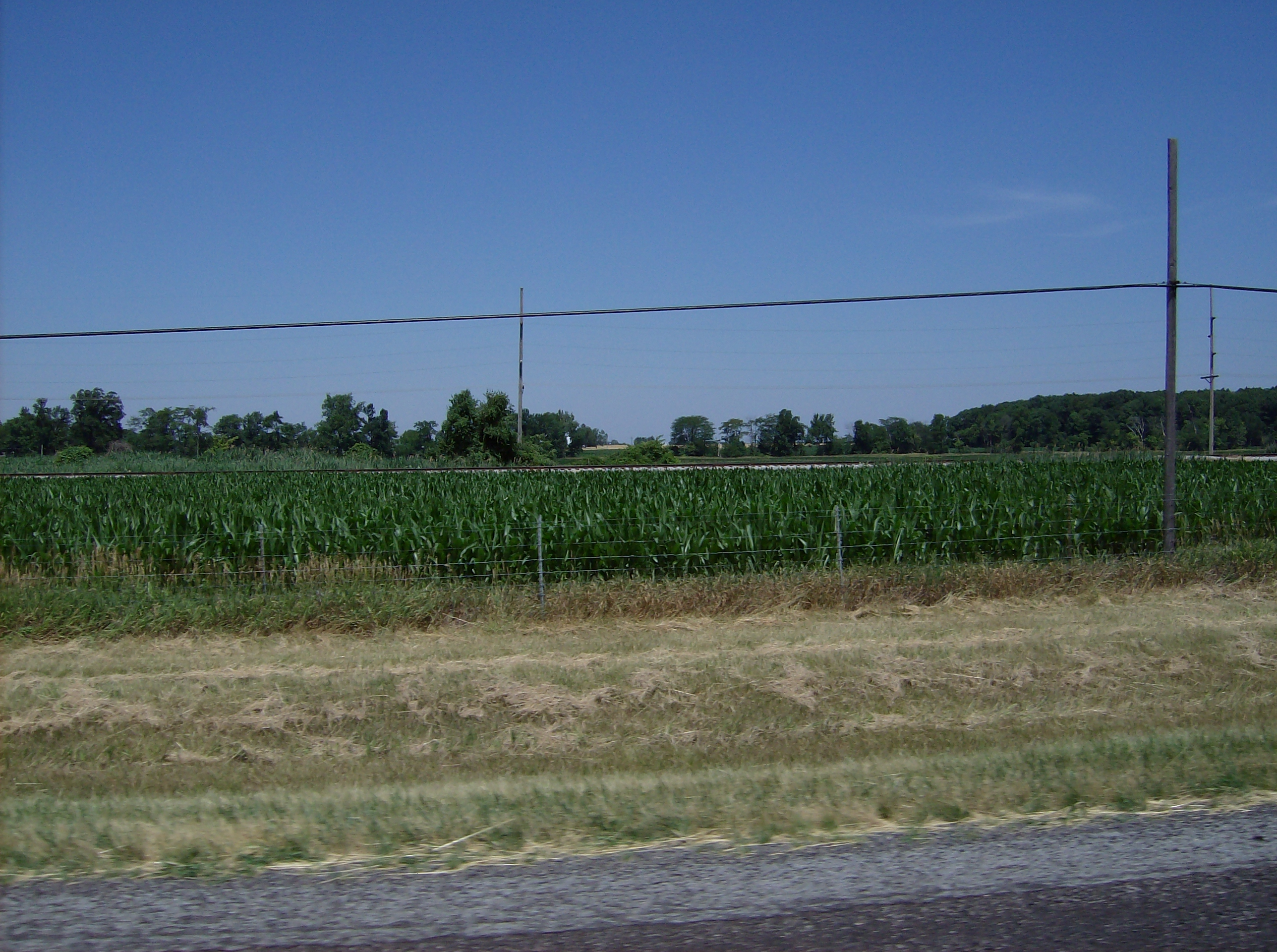
- Cornfields along Interstate 75

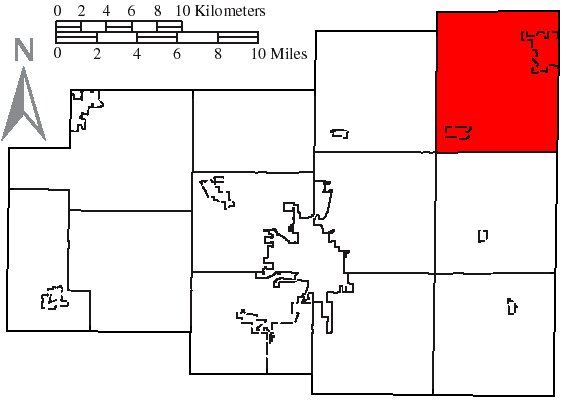
- Location of Richland Township, Allen County, Ohio.
- Coordinates: 40°52′34″N 83°55′46″W
- Country: United States
- State: Ohio
- County: Allen

Area
  - Total: 41.9 sq mi (108.6 km^{2})
  - Land: 41.7 sq mi (107.9 km^{2})
  - Water: 0.31 sq mi (0.8 km^{2})
- Elevation: 827 ft (252 m)

Population (2020)
  - Total: 5,871
  - Density: 151/sq mi (58.3/km^{2})
- Time zone: UTC-5 (Eastern (EST))
  - Summer (DST): UTC-4 (EDT)
- FIPS code: 39-66614
- GNIS feature ID: 1085698

Richland Township is one of the twelve townships of Allen County, Ohio, United States. The population at the 2020 census was 5,871.

== Geography ==
Located in the northeastern corner of the county, it borders the following townships:

- Riley Township, Putnam County - north
- Union Township, Hancock County - northeast
- Orange Township, Hancock County - east
- Liberty Township, Hardin County - southeast corner
- Jackson Township - south
- Bath Township - southwest corner
- Monroe Township - west
- Pleasant Township, Putnam County - northwest

Two villages are located in Richland Township: Beaverdam in the southwest, and part of Bluffton in the northeast.

== Name and history ==
It is one of twelve Richland Townships statewide.

== Government ==
The township is governed by a three-member board of trustees, who are elected in November of odd-numbered years to a four-year term beginning on the following January 1. Two are elected in the year after the presidential election and one is elected in the year before it. There is also an elected township fiscal officer, who serves a four-year term beginning on April 1 of the year after the election, which is held in November of the year before the presidential election. Vacancies in the fiscal officership or on the board of trustees are filled by the remaining trustees. Public meetings are held the second and fourth Tuesdays of each month at 8pm unless otherwise posted per Ohio Revised Code Requirements for public notifications.
