= Orange Township, Ohio =

Orange Township, Ohio may refer to:

- Orange Township, Ashland County, Ohio
- Orange Township, Carroll County, Ohio
- Orange Township, Delaware County, Ohio
- Orange Township, Hancock County, Ohio
- Orange Township, Meigs County, Ohio
- Orange Township, Shelby County, Ohio

== See also ==
- Orange, Ohio (disambiguation)
