= WICN =

Jazz music public radio station in Worcester, Massachusetts

- Worcester, Massachusetts; United States
- Broadcast area: Central Massachusetts
- Frequency: 90.5 MHz (HD Radio)
- Branding: 90.5 WICN

Programming
- Format: Public radio
- Affiliations: NPR

Ownership
- Owner: WICN Public Radio, Inc

History
- First air date: 1969
- Call sign meaning: "Worcester Inter-Collegiate Network"

Technical information
- Licensing authority: FCC
- Facility ID: 72379
- Class: B1
- ERP: 1,100 watts
- HAAT: 247 meters (810 ft)
- Transmitter coordinates: 42°18′11.3″N 71°53′50.3″W

Links
- Public license information: Public file; LMS
- Webcast: Listen live
- Website: www.wicn.org

WICN (90.5 FM) is a NPR member radio station in Worcester, Massachusetts. It broadcasts commercial-free, 24 hours a day to an audience of over 40,000. The programming is mostly jazz, with daily evening shows dedicated to soul, bluegrass, Americana, folk and blues, world music, and Sunday night public affairs programming. WICN's mission statement is as follows:

"Arts and culture contribute to a quality of life that keeps a community vibrant and economically alive. WICN Public Radio is committed to this ideal through the presentation of authentic, independent music, on the radio and in the concert halls, preserving America's living art forms of Jazz and Folk music for generations to enjoy."

== History ==
WICN began in 1969 as the Worcester Inter-Collegiate Network, comprising Worcester Polytechnic Institute and The College of the Holy Cross. In 1980, the station became a member of National Public Radio, and was accredited by the Corporation for Public Broadcasting in 1987. Through 2000, their studios were located at 6 Chatham Street. This location was formerly a YWCA and the swimming pool, now drained, housed the station's record collection. At this time the station's transmitter was 8,000 watts (directional) and located on the WUNI (channel 27) tower at Styles Hill in Boylston, Massachusetts. In March 2010, WICN completed another change making its signal less directional. It is now located on Asnebumskit Hill in Paxton, along with the antenna for WAAF (now WKVB).

== See also ==
- List of jazz radio stations in the United States
