= XHZAZ-FM =

Radio station in Zacatecas, Zacatecas, Mexico

- Zacatecas City, Zacatecas; Mexico
- Frequency: 99.3 FM
- Branding: Amor Es

Programming
- Format: Romantic

Ownership
- Owner: Grupo Radiorama; (XEZAZ-AM, S.A. de C.V.)
- Operator: Grupo Radiofónico ZER
- Sister stations: XHEXZ-FM, XHZER-FM, XHLK-FM

History
- First air date: November 30, 1994 (concession)
- Call sign meaning: Zacatecas, Zacatecas

Technical information
- Licensing authority: CRT
- Class: B1
- ERP: 10 kW
- HAAT: 136.2 m (447 ft)
- Transmitter coordinates: 22°46′30″N 102°34′29″W

Links
- Webcast: Listen live
- Website: grupozer.mx

XHZAZ-FM is a radio station on 99.3 FM in Zacatecas City, Zacatecas, Mexico. It is owned by Grupo Radiorama and operated by Grupo Radiofónico Zer, carrying a romantic format under the name Amor Es.

== History ==
Logo as Amor 99.3, with the ACIR Amor format, used until early 2017

XEZAZ-AM 1120, a 250-watt daytimer, received its concession on November 30, 1994. It was owned by Voz y Música, S.A., a Radiorama subsidiary. XEZAZ quickly moved to 970 with 1,000 watts day and 500 night.

XEZAZ was cleared to move to FM in November 2010.

From 2011 until early 2017, XHZAZ used ACIR's Amor romantic music format, which it dumped in February 2017 with a subtle name change to "Amor Es".
