= WXRY-LP =

Coordinates: 34.003°N 81.034°W

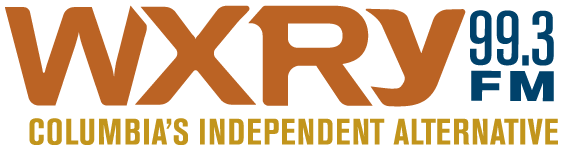
- Columbia, South Carolina; United States
- Broadcast area: Columbia, South Carolina
- Frequency: 99.3 FM
- Branding: "WXRY 99.3"

Programming
- Format: Adult Album Alternative-leaning Alternative Rock

Ownership
- Owner: IndieMedia LLC

Technical information
- Licensing authority: FCC
- Class: L1
- ERP: 17 watts
- HAAT: 71.5 meters (235 ft)

Links
- Public license information: LMS
- Website: http://www.wxryfm.org

WXRY-LP is a LPFM radio station, broadcasting at 99.3 FM. The station is owned by Gamecock Alumni Broadcasters, a nonprofit organization, dba a service of the Independent Media Foundation. The format is officially Adult Album Alternative, although it leans more toward alternative rock.

== Station history ==
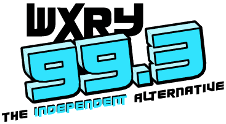
Former logo

The station started test authority on its new LPFM signal in 2005 with a loop of Dance-oriented songs and the brief on-air moniker "Yes 99" (a tribute to Columbia's former Dance-oriented CHR "Yes 97" (WYYS), now known as WLTY). When testing was complete in March 2005, the station stunted for a few hours with a brief snippet of "Revolution 9" from The Beatles's "White Album". The Adult Album Alternative format was unveiled at the end of the stunt.

The WXRY call letters were used once before in the Columbia radio market. The 93.5 frequency (now known as WARQ) had originally signed on as WXRY in 1971.

WXRY's live weekday show, Varholy and the Class, airs Monday through Friday 3pm to 7pm, with DJ Steve Varholy often hosting interviews with members of the community to increase awareness of local issues, upcoming events, and other opportunities. Occasionally, artists such as Barns Courtney have surprised listeners during the show, sitting for conversational interviews with Varholy during breaks, and performing stripped-down versions of their songs. The station's social media accounts will typically broadcast such visits simultaneously via the WXRY social channels. In addition, in 2005 the station started an Unsigned radio show on Sundays beginning at 8pm Eastern, hosted by Randy Borawski and Brent Lundy, which features interviews and live music by unsigned musicians and bands through the southeast. WXRY Unsigned is aired via remote broadcast on location from the British Bulldog Pub.

On April 6, 2012, WXRY was granted a construction permit for a move to 99.5 MHz. WXRY continues to broadcast from the historic Barringer building in downtown Columbia. The station's live feed can be streamed from its website, via the TuneIn Radio mobile app, and at three frequencies:

- 99.3FM: Can be picked up within approximately 10 miles of the WXRY studio
- 99.1FM: Irmo, Chapin, Ballentine, Harbison, and Lexington (affiliate)
- 98.1FM: Northeast, Sandhills, Blythewood, Lugoff/Elgin (affiliate)
