= WQJC-LP =

- Quincy, Illinois; United States
- Frequency: 107.9 MHz

Ownership
- Owner: Quincy Jazz Corporation

Technical information
- Licensing authority: FCC
- Facility ID: 125912
- Class: L1
- ERP: 30 watts
- HAAT: 54.0 meters (177.2 ft)
- Transmitter coordinates: 39°56′20.16559″N 91°24′3.54046″W

Links
- Public license information: LMS

WQJC-LP (107.9 FM) is a radio station licensed to Quincy, Illinois, United States. The station is currently owned by Quincy Jazz Corporation.

== See also ==
- List of jazz radio stations in the United States
