= Orange Township, Hancock County, Ohio =

Township in Ohio, US

- Township
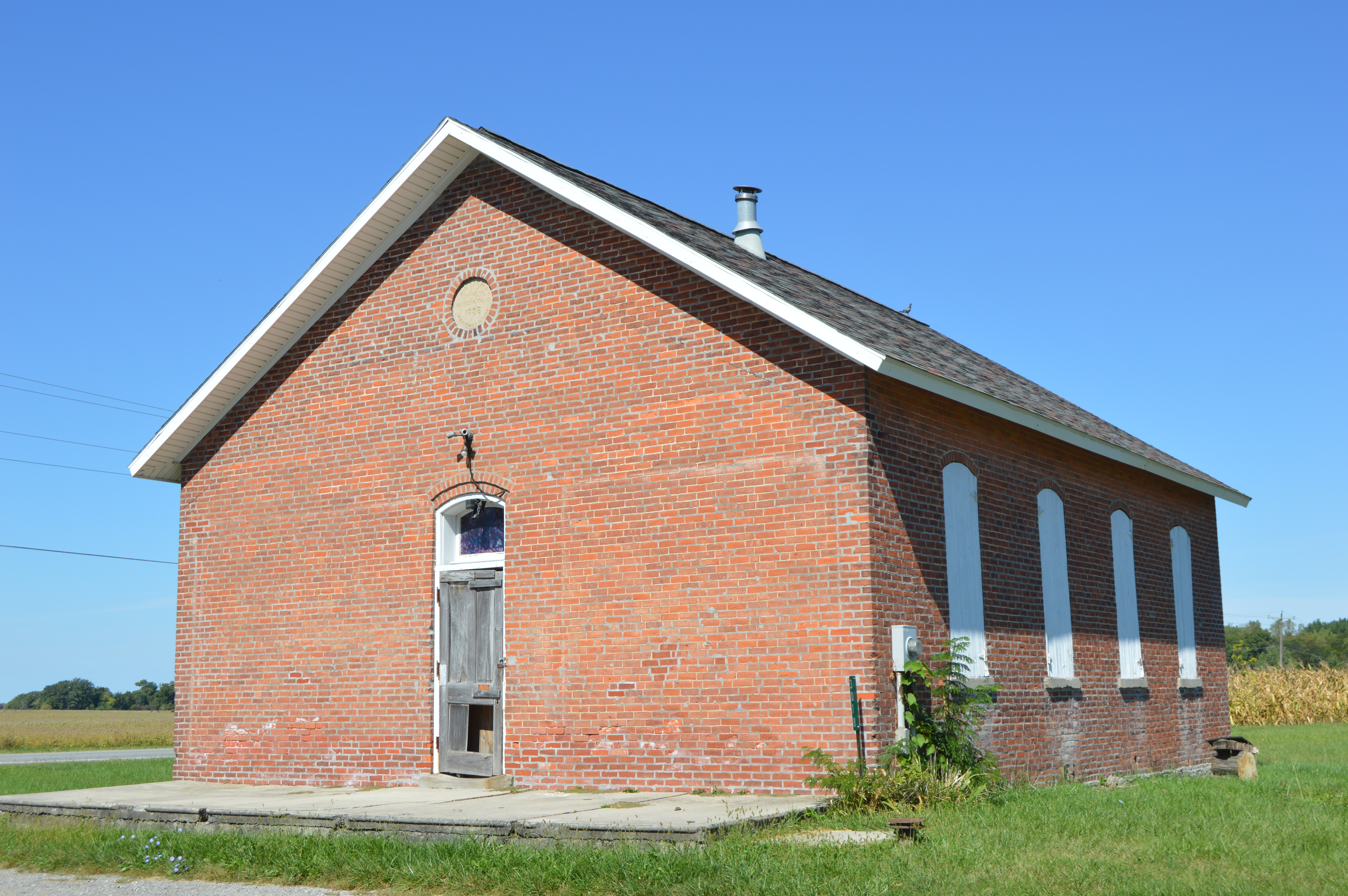
- School on State Route 103 east of Bluffton

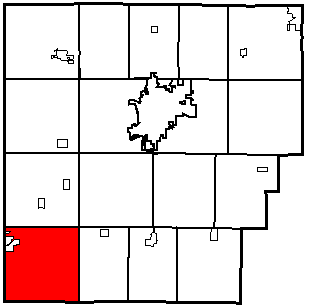
- Location of Orange Township in Hancock County
- Coordinates: 40°51′48″N 83°50′41″W
- Country: United States
- State: Ohio
- County: Hancock

Area
  - Total: 36.24 sq mi (93.86 km^{2})
  - Land: 36.22 sq mi (93.80 km^{2})
  - Water: 0.023 sq mi (0.06 km^{2})
- Elevation: 869 ft (265 m)

Population (2020)
  - Total: 1,301
  - Density: 35.92/sq mi (13.87/km^{2})
- Time zone: UTC-5 (Eastern (EST))
  - Summer (DST): UTC-4 (EDT)
- FIPS code: 39-58632
- GNIS feature ID: 1086250

Orange Township is one of the seventeen townships of Hancock County, Ohio, United States. As of the 2020 census, the population was 1,301.

== Geography ==
Located in the southwestern corner of the county, it borders the following townships:

- Union Township - north
- Eagle Township - northeast corner
- Van Buren Township - east
- Washington Township, Hardin County - southeast corner
- Liberty Township, Hardin County - south
- Jackson Township, Allen County - southwest corner
- Richland Township, Allen County - west

Part of the village of Bluffton is located in northwestern Orange Township.

== Name and history ==
It is one of six Orange Townships statewide.

Orange Township was organized in 1836.

== Government ==
The township is governed by a three-member board of trustees, who are elected in November of odd-numbered years to a four-year term beginning on the following January 1. Two are elected in the year after the presidential election and one is elected in the year before it. There is also an elected township fiscal officer, who serves a four-year term beginning on April 1 of the year after the election, which is held in November of the year before the presidential election. Vacancies in the fiscal officership or on the board of trustees are filled by the remaining trustees.
