= WNCU =

- Durham, North Carolina; United States
- Broadcast area: Raleigh–Durham
- Frequency: 90.7 MHz (HD Radio)

Programming
- Format: jazz; public radio
- Affiliations: National Public Radio; Pacifica Radio Network; Public Radio Exchange

Ownership
- Owner: North Carolina Central University

History
- First air date: August 1995
- Call sign meaning: North Carolina Central University

Technical information
- Licensing authority: FCC
- Facility ID: 49162
- Class: C2
- ERP: 50,000 watts
- HAAT: 132 meters (433 ft)
- Transmitter coordinates: 36°3′33.5″N 78°57′13″W

Links
- Public license information: Public file; LMS
- Webcast: Listen live
- Website: www.wncu.org

WNCU (90.7 FM) is a radio station broadcasting a jazz format. Licensed to Durham, North Carolina, United States, the station serves the Durham area. The station is owned by North Carolina Central University and features programming from National Public Radio and Public Radio Exchange.

WNCU broadcasts in the HD Radio format.

== See also ==
- List of jazz radio stations in the United States
- List of community radio stations in the United States
