= Van Buren Township, Hancock County, Ohio =

Township in Ohio, US

- Township
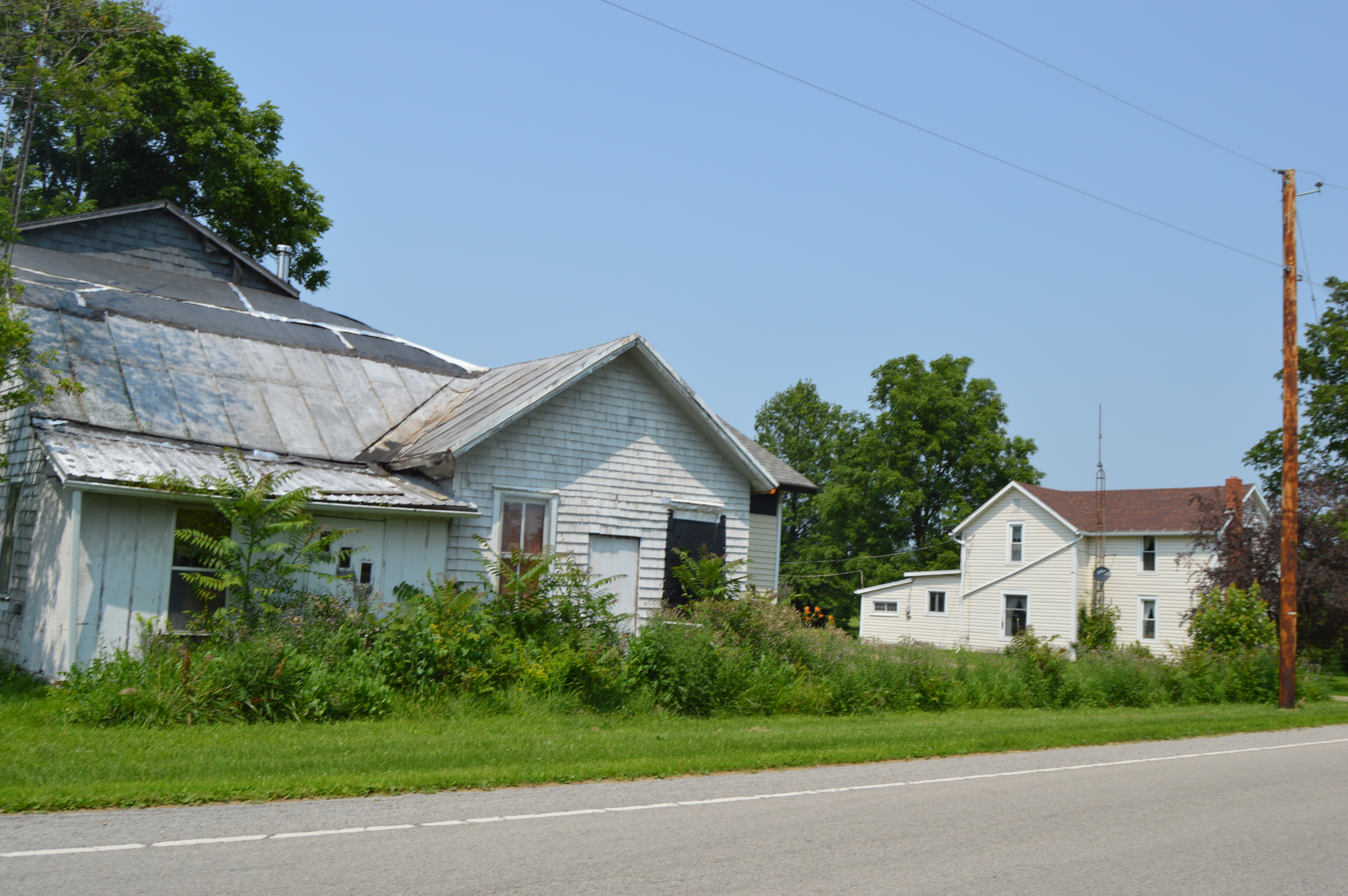
- On the Lincoln Highway in New Stark

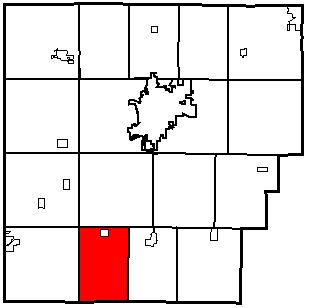
- Location of Van Buren Township in Hancock County
- Coordinates: 40°52′39″N 83°43′20″W
- Country: United States
- State: Ohio
- County: Hancock

Area
  - Total: 24.4 sq mi (63.2 km^{2})
  - Land: 24.4 sq mi (63.2 km^{2})
  - Water: 0 sq mi (0.0 km^{2})
- Elevation: 889 ft (271 m)

Population (2020)
  - Total: 1,024
  - Density: 42.0/sq mi (16.2/km^{2})
- Time zone: UTC-5 (Eastern (EST))
  - Summer (DST): UTC-4 (EDT)
- ZIP code: 45889
- Area code: 419
- FIPS code: 39-79408
- GNIS feature ID: 1086254

Van Buren Township is one of the seventeen townships of Hancock County, Ohio, United States. As of the 2020 census, the population was 1,024.

== Geography ==
Located in the southern part of the county, it borders the following townships:

- Eagle Township - north
- Madison Township - east
- Washington Township, Hardin County - south
- Liberty Township, Hardin County - southwest corner
- Orange Township - west
- Union Township - northwest corner

The village of Jenera is located in northern Van Buren Township.

== Name and history ==
Statewide, other Van Buren Townships are located in Darke, Putnam, and Shelby counties.

Van Buren Township was organized in 1831. It was named for Martin Van Buren, who had at that time served as Secretary of State, and who would go on to become President of the United States.

== Government ==
The township is governed by a three-member board of trustees, who are elected in November of odd-numbered years to a four-year term beginning on the following January 1. Two are elected in the year after the presidential election and one is elected in the year before it. There is also an elected township fiscal officer, who serves a four-year term beginning on April 1 of the year after the election, which is held in November of the year before the presidential election. Vacancies in the fiscal officership or on the board of trustees are filled by the remaining trustees.
