= XHORA-FM =

Radio station in Orizaba, Veracruz, Mexico

- Orizaba, Veracruz; Mexico
- Frequency: 99.3 FM
- Branding: Ori Stereo

Programming
- Format: Full-service

Ownership
- Owner: Grupo Peláez Domínguez; (PD Multimedios, S.A. de C.V.)

History
- First air date: July 7, 1993 (concession)
- Call sign meaning: ORizabA

Technical information
- Class: B
- ERP: 15.012 kW
- HAAT: 46.7 m
- Transmitter coordinates: 18°58′34.6″N 97°10′37.2″W

Links
- Webcast: Listen live
- Website: oristereo.com

XHORA-FM is a radio station on 99.3 FM in Orizaba, Veracruz, Mexico, known as Ori Stereo.

== History ==
XHORA received its concession on July 7, 1993.
