= WVID =

- Añasco, Puerto Rico; Puerto Rico
- Broadcast area: Puerto Rico
- Frequency: 90.3 MHz
- Branding: Vid 90

Programming
- Format: Jazz

Ownership
- Owner: Rev. Oscar Correa Agosto; (Centro Colegial Cristiano)

History
- First air date: 1982; 44 years ago

Technical information
- Licensing authority: FCC
- Facility ID: 10053
- Class: B
- ERP: 14,500 watts
- HAAT: 304.0 meters (997.4 ft)
- Transmitter coordinates: 18°19′50″N 67°10′59″W

Links
- Public license information: Public file; LMS
- Webcast: Listen Live
- Website: vid90.com

WVID (90.3 FM), branded on-air as Vid 90, is a radio station broadcasting a jazz format. Licensed to Añasco, Puerto Rico, it serves the Puerto Rico area. The station is currently owned by Centro Colegial Cristiano, Inc., which is presided by Rev. Oscar Correa Agosto. WVID is mainly dedicated to the various styles of jazz and educational programming. The station has an ERP of 14,500 watts which makes it the third most powerful station of its area. WVID is dedicated to various styles of jazz. WVID has an ultra target of 35, while it is very popular in the 25–49 demographic. The station shares around 7 percent of the area's total audience. (Similarly targeted stations usually share around 1.5 percent of their total market. Comparatively, the most popular station in the area shares around 11% of the total market.)

Because of its targeted audience and unique programming WVID was recently selected among the stations in the island, to showcase various features in the Central American and Caribbean games, an honor usually reserved for the largest stations. The station represented Puerto Rico's radio in the international media. WVID is also involved in sports. Its programming is available via the Internet on its website, www.vid90.com.

== See also ==
- List of jazz radio stations in the United States
