= Bay FM (Byron Bay) =

Community radio station in New South Wales, Australia

Coordinates: 28°38′40″S 153°36′46″E

Bay FM (call sign: 2BAY) is a community radio station serving the Byron Shire and beyond from Byron Bay, New South Wales, Australia.

Run entirely by volunteers, Bay FM aims to provide independent, community-responsive radio that informs and entertains both locally and globally.

Locally, the station's frequency is 99.9 MHz and it covers the Northern Rivers region of New South Wales.

In the late 1990s, Bay FM spawned the broadcasting of Byron's "Top 3 DJs", Soopa Kleen, GeeDay Jack Doff and Fresh Baby, each of whom made acclaimed appearances on a variety of Bay FM programs in the days of the "old building".

Within the group of presenters responsible, Bay FM experienced its first broadcasts using digital devices and equipment, originally and plugged straight into the desk via the hidden RCA connectors.

The "Knights Of Bullthingy" – DJ Michael Kenyon, The Milkshake Brothers, Grant Kenyon and Guano Thrust – were regulars during this period and remain active in their careers.
