= KFOH-LP =

- Saint Joseph, Missouri; United States
- Frequency: 99.3 MHz
- Branding: SJMF Radio

Programming
- Format: Variety

Ownership
- Owner: St. Joseph Music Foundation

Technical information
- Licensing authority: FCC
- Facility ID: 191941
- Class: L1
- ERP: 36 watts
- HAAT: 51 metres (167 ft)
- Transmitter coordinates: 39°46′37.28″N 94°49′45.33″W

Links
- Public license information: LMS
- Webcast: Listen Live
- Website: Official Website

KFOH-LP (99.3 FM) is a radio station licensed to serve the community of Saint Joseph, Missouri. The station is owned by St. Joseph Music Foundation. It airs a variety format.

The station was assigned the KFOH-LP call letters by the Federal Communications Commission on June 9, 2014.
