= CFOR-FM =

Coordinates: 46°24′08″N 75°56′45″W

- Maniwaki, Quebec, Canada; Canada
- Frequency: 99.3 FM
- Branding: Pur Rock 99,3

Programming
- Format: active rock

Ownership
- Owner: Radio CFOR Inc.

History
- First air date: 1975 (AM); 1993 (FM)

Technical information
- Class: A
- ERP: horizontal polarization only: 2.4 kWs
- HAAT: 99 meters (325 ft)

CFOR-FM is a Canadian radio station that broadcasts an active rock format at 99.3 FM in Maniwaki, Quebec.

The station originally signed on in 1975 at 1340 AM as CKMG until it moved to its current frequency in 1993. The CFOR call sign was adopted in 1999. (The CFOR call sign was formerly used at a radio station in Orillia, Ontario.)

The station is currently owned by Radio CFOR Inc.

On October 27, 2009, the station applied to add an FM transmitter at Mont-Laurier, Quebec and was denied by the CRTC on April 16, 2010. If approved, the new transmitter would have a broadcast on 98.3 MHz.

On July 31, 2020 in decision 2020-238 the CRTC chose not to renew this station's license which would expire on August 31, 2020.
