= KEFH =

- Clarendon, Texas; United States
- Broadcast area: Amarillo, Texas
- Frequency: 99.3 MHz
- Branding: Kool 99.3

Programming
- Format: Classic hits

Ownership
- Owner: Donna and Joe Davis; (Davis Broadcast Co., Inc.)

History
- First air date: 1999

Technical information
- Licensing authority: FCC
- Facility ID: 77849
- Class: C2
- ERP: 44,000 watts
- HAAT: 159 meters
- Transmitter coordinates: 35°4′36″N 100°53′33″W

Links
- Public license information: Public file; LMS

KEFH (99.3 FM) is a radio station broadcasting a classic hits format. Licensed to Clarendon, Texas, United States, it serves the Amarillo area. The station is currently owned by Donna and Joe Davis, through licensee Davis Broadcast Co., Inc.
