= WEIB =

- Northampton, Massachusetts; United States
- Broadcast area: Springfield, Massachusetts
- Frequency: 106.3 MHz
- Branding: 106.3 Smooth FM

Programming
- Format: Smooth jazz
- Affiliations: Compass Media Networks

Ownership
- Owner: Cutting Edge Broadcasting, Inc.

History
- First air date: 1999

Technical information
- Licensing authority: FCC
- Facility ID: 14771
- Class: A
- ERP: 3,000 watts
- HAAT: 88 m (289 ft)
- Transmitter coordinates: 42°22′24″N 72°40′23″W

Links
- Public license information: Public file; LMS
- Webcast: Listen live
- Website: www.weibfm.com

WEIB (106.3 FM) is a radio station broadcasting a smooth jazz format. Licensed to Northampton, Massachusetts, United States, the station serves the Springfield, Massachusetts, area. The only commercial smooth jazz radio station in the Northeastern United States, WEIB is owned by Cutting Edge Broadcasting, Inc., and maintains studios on King Drive in Northampton.

== History ==
The construction of a radio station on 106.3 MHz in Northampton took more than 15 years to accomplish. The first application for the frequency was filed on December 16, 1983, by a company controlled by Boston radio DJ Kenneth Carberry (known on air as Ken Carter). Three other applications were made, including one in 1984 by Carol Moore Cutting (then under the name of Cutter Broadcasting), and the Federal Communications Commission (FCC) designated the set for comparative hearing in April 1986. Cutting had been inspired to file for the frequency when she moved to Northampton in 1971 and noted a lack of variety in local radio as well as a lack of Black-owned stations regionally.

Mentoring is very important because I would not have this radio station if I had not turned on the television and saw another African American woman on the airwaves in Hartford, Connecticut.

— Carol Moore Cutting

All except the Cutting and Carberry applications left the field, and FCC administrative law judge Joseph Stirmer issued an initial decision in January 1988 favoring Cutter, which the FCC review board then affirmed. It was not until 1992 that a construction permit was issued, after Carberry exhausted appeals to the full FCC and a federal appeals court. The station then faced another seven years of delays regarding difficulties securing a tower site. Prolonged negotiations with local AM station WHMP were compounded by the need to replace that station's overloaded tower and, according to Cutting, by Robert F. X. Sillerman, who had allegedly made it "quite clear [she] wasn't going to be on the air any time soon". During this time, Cutting considered giving up but credited staying in the fight to seeing another Black woman on television: Gayle King, then an anchor at WFSB television in nearby Hartford, Connecticut, who provided her mentorship. Much of the studio equipment had been bought as much as five years before the station started broadcasting.

The station began broadcasting in mid-1999 with full commercial operation by year's end, airing its present mix of smooth jazz and adult contemporary music. The station cost $750,000 to start, financed by Cutting's savings and members of her family. By 2020, WEIB remained the only Black-owned radio station in New England.
