= WZRF-LP =

Coordinates: 35.882°N 78.716°W

- Wilmington, North Carolina; United States
- Frequency: 99.3 MHz
- Branding: "99.3 The Zurf"

Programming
- Format: Album-oriented rock

Ownership
- Owner: Neptune Radio Incorporated

History
- First air date: December 7, 2017
- Call sign meaning: "The ZuRF

Technical information
- Licensing authority: FCC
- Class: LP100
- ERP: 100 watts
- HAAT: 30 meters (98 ft)

Links
- Public license information: LMS
- Website: www.993thezurf.fm

WZRF-LP (99.3 FM) is a non-profit community low power FM ("LPFM") radio station in Wilmington, North Carolina. The station signed on December 3, 2017 with an album-oriented rock format.

Following the passing of the station's original owner, it has recently been revived and will continue to present the finest in Deep Cuts, AOR and Classic music to the Wilmington, Wrightsville Beach and Coastal Carolina area.
