= Riley Creek (Ohio) =

Stream in Ohio, United States

Coordinates: 41°00′41″N 83°59′54″W

Riley Creek is a 22.2-mile (35.7 km) long stream in the U.S. state of Ohio. It is a tributary of the Blanchard River.

Riley Creek was named for James W. Riley, a pioneer who drowned while crossing the stream.

== See also ==
- List of rivers of Ohio
