= WBTV: The Warner Channel UK =

Ownership
- Owner: WarnerMedia

WBTV: The Warner Channel UK was a satellite channel that was planned to be run by Warner Bros. for British Sky Broadcasting. It was slated for launch in 1996, but Warner bosses felt that the proposals for the network were "unrealistic" - and decided to axe the plans.
