= Rawson, Ohio =

- Village
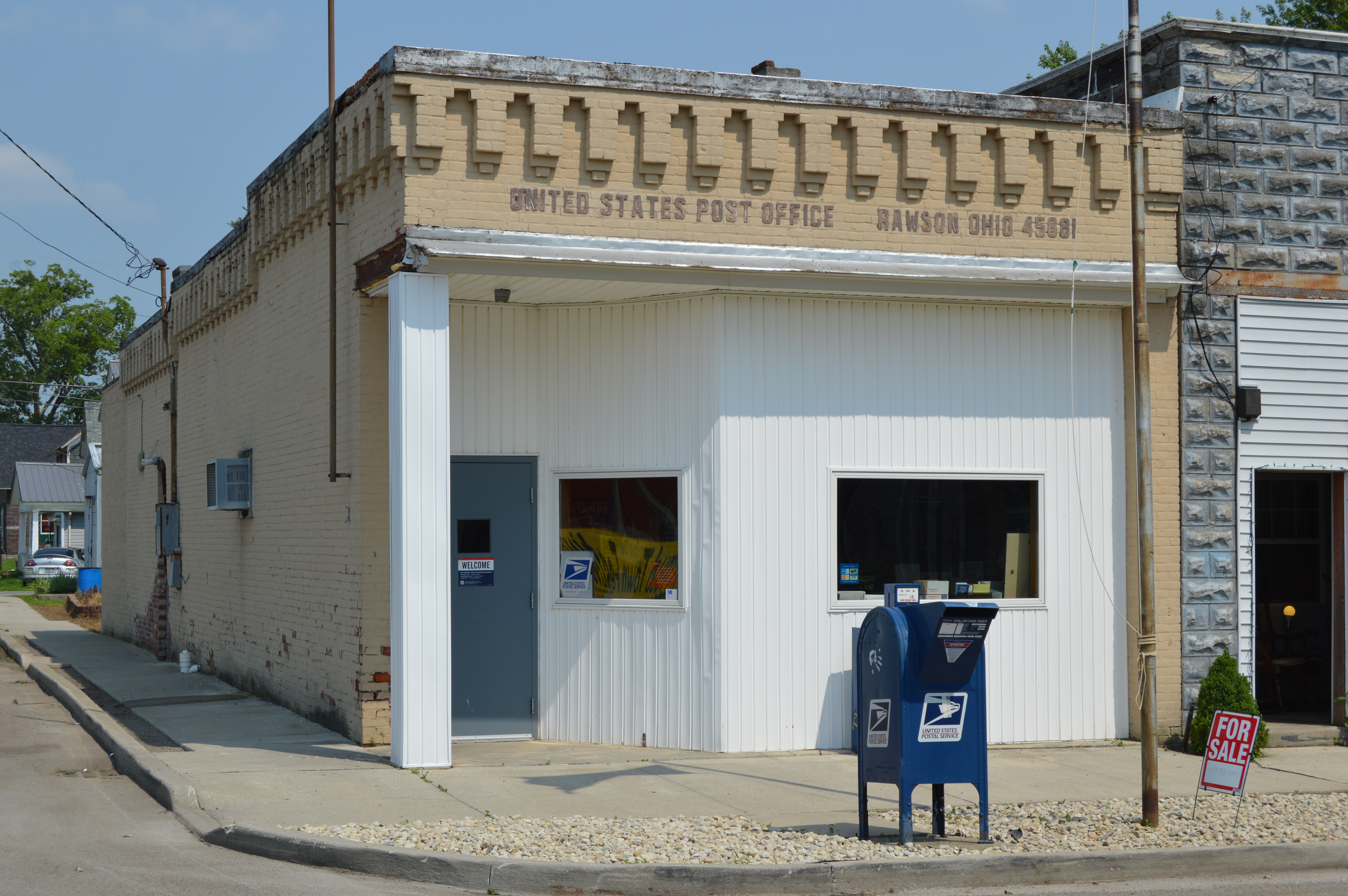
- Post office on Main Street

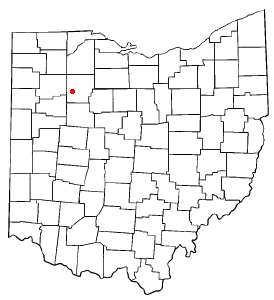
- Location of Rawson, Ohio

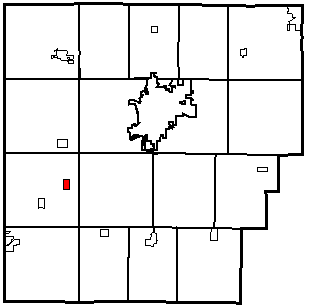
- Location within Hancock County
- Coordinates: 40°57′25″N 83°47′06″W
- Country: United States
- State: Ohio
- County: Hancock

Government
  - Type: Village council

Area
  - Total: 0.38 sq mi (0.99 km^{2})
  - Land: 0.38 sq mi (0.99 km^{2})
  - Water: 0 sq mi (0.00 km^{2})
- Elevation: 817 ft (249 m)

Population (2020)
  - Total: 567
  - Density: 1,483.5/sq mi (572.79/km^{2})
- Time zone: UTC-5 (Eastern (EST))
  - Summer (DST): UTC-4 (EDT)
- ZIP codes: 45841, 45881
- Area code: 419
- FIPS code: 39-65634
- GNIS feature ID: 2399047
- Website: https://rawsonvillage.org/

Rawson is a village in Hancock County, Ohio, United States. The population was 567 at the 2020 census.

== History ==
Rawson was laid out in 1855 when the railroad was extended to that point. The village was named for L. Q. Rawson, the president of the Fremont and Indiana Railroad. Rawson was incorporated in 1884. In 1889 White Caps were active in Rawson, twice destroying a Rawson saloon.

== Geography ==
According to the United States Census Bureau, the village has a total area of 0.40 square miles (1.04 km^{2}), all land.

== Demographics ==
Historical population
Census	Pop.	Note	%±
1880	227		—
1890	458		101.8%
1900	473		3.3%
1910	470		−0.6%
1920	416		−11.5%
1930	453		8.9%
1940	441		−2.6%
1950	407		−7.7%
1960	407		0.0%
1970	466		14.5%
1980	477		2.4%
1990	482		1.0%
2000	465		−3.5%
2010	570		22.6%
2020	567		−0.5%
U.S. Decennial Census

=== 2010 census ===
As of the census of 2010, there were 570 people, 191 households, and 152 families living in the village. The population density was 1,425.0 inhabitants per square mile (550.2/km^{2}). There were 209 housing units at an average density of 522.5 per square mile (201.7/km^{2}). The racial makeup of the village was 95.6% White, 1.9% African American, 0.9% Asian, 0.2% from other races, and 1.4% from two or more races. Hispanic or Latino of any race were 1.9% of the population.

There were 191 households, of which 45.5% had children under the age of 18 living with them, 63.4% were married couples living together, 12.6% had a female householder with no husband present, 3.7% had a male householder with no wife present, and 20.4% were non-families. 15.2% of all households were made up of individuals, and 3.1% had someone living alone who was 65 years of age or older. The average household size was 2.98 and the average family size was 3.28.

The median age in the village was 30.8 years. 33.5% of residents were under the age of 18; 7.6% were between the ages of 18 and 24; 29.1% were from 25 to 44; 21.7% were from 45 to 64; and 8.1% were 65 years of age or older. The gender makeup of the village was 49.1% male and 50.9% female.

=== 2000 census ===
As of the census of 2000, there were 465 people, 159 households, and 127 families living in the village. The population density was 1,168.6 inhabitants per square mile (451.2/km^{2}). There were 166 housing units at an average density of 417.2 per square mile (161.1/km^{2}). The racial makeup of the village was 97.85% White, 0.22% Native American, 0.22% Asian, 0.43% from other races, and 1.29% from two or more races. Hispanic or Latino of any race were 1.08% of the population.

There were 159 households, out of which 43.4% had children under the age of 18 living with them, 65.4% were married couples living together, 11.3% had a female householder with no husband present, and 19.5% were non-families. 16.4% of all households were made up of individuals, and 6.9% had someone living alone who was 65 years of age or older. The average household size was 2.92 and the average family size was 3.21.

In the village, the population was spread out, with 32.0% under the age of 18, 8.0% from 18 to 24, 32.3% from 25 to 44, 17.0% from 45 to 64, and 10.8% who were 65 years of age or older. The median age was 33 years. For every 100 females there were 101.3 males. For every 100 females age 18 and over, there were 96.3 males.

The median income for a household in the village was $42,969, and the median income for a family was $43,542. Males had a median income of $31,528 versus $22,500 for females. The per capita income for the village was $14,259. About 6.3% of families and 5.9% of the population were below the poverty line, including 4.5% of those under age 18 and none of those age 65 or over.

== Notable person ==
- Cassius Jackson Keyser, mathematician
