= WOWN =

- Shawano, Wisconsin; United States
- Broadcast area: Green Bay, Wisconsin
- Frequency: 99.3 MHz
- Branding: Classic Hits B99.3

Programming
- Format: Classic hits
- Affiliations: Jones Radio Network, Motor Racing Network

Ownership
- Owner: Results Broadcasting Inc.

History
- First air date: December 1966 (as WTCH-FM)
- Former call signs: WTCH-FM (1966–1979)

Technical information
- Licensing authority: FCC
- Facility ID: 72156
- Class: C3
- ERP: 14,000 watts
- HAAT: 134 meters
- Transmitter coordinates: 44°45′14.00″N 88°20′1.00″W

Links
- Public license information: Public file; LMS
- Webcast: Listen live
- Website: WOWN Online

WOWN (99.3 FM) is a radio station broadcasting a classic hits format. Licensed to Shawano, Wisconsin, United States, the station serves the Green Bay area. Depending on conditions, WOWN can be heard as far east as Manistee, Michigan. The station is currently owned by Results Broadcasting Inc. and features programming from Jones Radio Network and Motor Racing Network. Its priginal call letters were WTCH-FM.

WOWN broadcasts from a transmitter 10 miles northwest of Pulaski. The Transmitter is located in Shawano County, Angelica Township N 4701 County C Road and Nichols Drive. The 4.91 acres of land, as well as the tower, is owned by EIP HOLDINGS II LLC (2 Allegheny Centre Nova, Tower OVA uiteITE 1002ittsburghURGH, PA 1). Its studios are located in a Chrysler/Dodge/Jeep S&L Motors Dealership just 6.9 Miles South of Pulaski, at the Intersection oghw Hiwayand 9 gw Hiway 32.
