= WDUK =

Country music radio station in Havana, Illinois

- Havana, Illinois; United States
- Frequency: 99.3 MHz

Programming
- Language: English
- Format: Country music

Ownership
- Owner: Illinois Valley Radio

History
- First air date: November 23, 1969
- Call sign meaning: Duck

Technical information
- Licensing authority: FCC
- Facility ID: 28313
- Class: A
- ERP: 3,000 watts
- HAAT: 91 meters (299 ft)
- Transmitter coordinates: 40°18′43.2″N 90°3′18″W

Links
- Public license information: Public file; LMS

WDUK (99.3 FM) is a commercial radio station broadcasting a country music format in Havana, Illinois, United States.

== History ==
The construction permit for WDUK was issued on October 1, 1969, to the Illinois Valley Broadcasting Company, owned by M. Kent Whitten and Lawrence and Robert Martin. The station was licensed on December 1, 1970. The station was acquired by Edwin G. Stimpson Jr., doing business as Illinois Valley Radio, in 1973.
