= Eagle Township, Hancock County, Ohio =

Township in Ohio, US

- Township
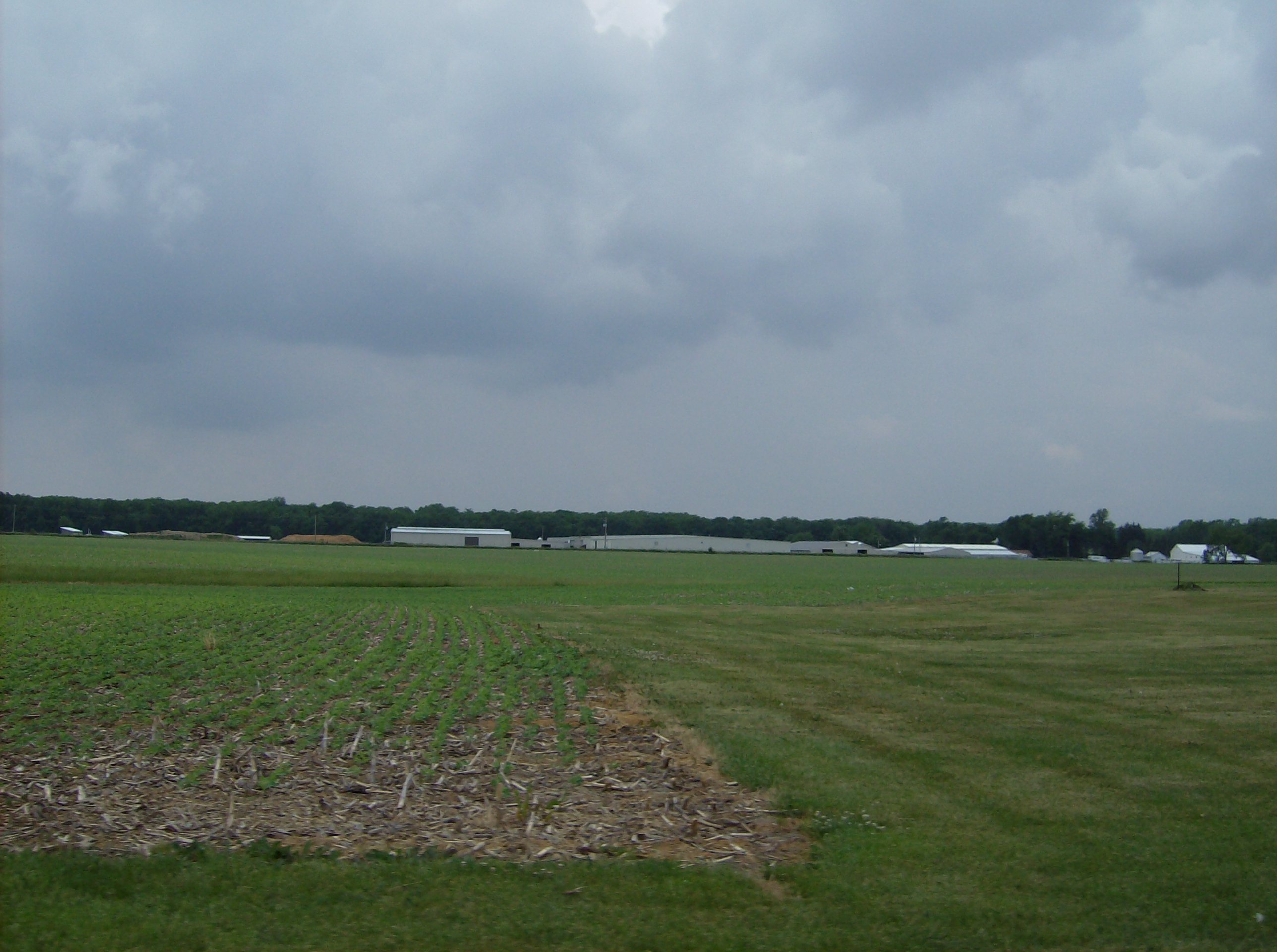
- University of Findlay equestrian complex, on U.S. Route 68

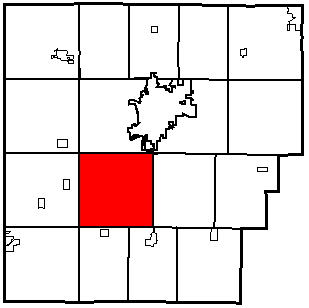
- Location of Eagle Township in Hancock County
- Coordinates: 40°57′33″N 83°42′46″W
- Country: United States
- State: Ohio
- County: Hancock

Area
  - Total: 35.8 sq mi (92.8 km^{2})
  - Land: 35.8 sq mi (92.7 km^{2})
  - Water: 0.039 sq mi (0.1 km^{2})
- Elevation: 830 ft (253 m)

Population (2020)
  - Total: 1,084
  - Density: 30.3/sq mi (11.7/km^{2})
- Time zone: UTC-5 (Eastern (EST))
  - Summer (DST): UTC-4 (EDT)
- FIPS code: 39-23086
- GNIS feature ID: 1086244

Eagle Township is one of the seventeen townships of Hancock County, Ohio, United States. As of the 2020 census the population was 1,084.

== Geography ==
Located in the central part of the county, it borders the following townships:

- Liberty Township - north
- Marion Township - northeast corner
- Jackson Township - east
- Madison Township - southeast
- Van Buren Township - south
- Orange Township - southwest corner
- Union Township - west
- Blanchard Township - northwest corner

No municipalities are located in Eagle Township.

== Name and history ==
Statewide, other Eagle Townships are located in Brown and Vinton counties.

== Government ==
The township is governed by a three-member board of trustees, who are elected in November of odd-numbered years to a four-year term beginning on the following January 1. Two are elected in the year after the presidential election and one is elected in the year before it. There is also an elected township fiscal officer, who serves a four-year term beginning on April 1 of the year after the election, which is held in November of the year before the presidential election. Vacancies in the fiscal officership or on the board of trustees are filled by the remaining trustees.
