= KPSM =

Coordinates: 31°43′10″N 99°00′57″W

- Brownwood, Texas; United States
- Frequency: 99.3 MHz
- Branding: The Rock

Programming
- Format: Contemporary Christian music

Ownership
- Owner: BLM of Brownwood, Inc.
- Sister stations: KBUB

Technical information
- Licensing authority: FCC
- Facility ID: 73699
- Class: C1
- ERP: 100,000 watts
- HAAT: 136 meters (446 ft)

Links
- Public license information: Public file; LMS
- Webcast: Listen live
- Website: kpsm.net

KPSM is a radio station airing a Contemporary Christian music format licensed to Brownwood, Texas, broadcasting on 99.3 FM. The station is owned by BLM of Brownwood, Inc.
