= CHSB-FM =

Christian radio station in Bedford, Nova Scotia

Coordinates: 44°44′13″N 63°39′10″W

- Bedford, Nova Scotia; Canada
- Broadcast area: Halifax Regional Municipality, Nova Scotia
- Frequency: 99.3 MHz
- Branding: Hilltop FM

Programming
- Format: Christian radio

Ownership
- Owner: Bedford Baptist Church

History
- First air date: July 26, 2006
- Call sign meaning: Canada Halifax Sackville Bedford

Technical information
- Class: LP
- ERP: 50 watts

Links
- Website: bedfordbaptist.ca

CHSB-FM is a Canadian radio station that broadcasts a Christian Radio format on the frequency 99.3 FM in Bedford, Nova Scotia and serving the northern suburbs of Halifax. The station is branded as Hilltop FM.

Owned by the Bedford Baptist Church, the station originally received CRTC approval on July 26, 2006, to operate on 89.1 FM; however, a technical change to broadcast at its current frequency 99.3 FM received approval on September 26, 2008, due to potential interference from a nearby radio station in Kentville, CIJK-FM 89.3, which received CRTC approval to broadcast in 2007.
