= WZLT =

Radio station in Tennessee, United States

- Lexington, Tennessee; United States
- Frequency: 99.3 MHz
- Branding: Z 99.3 FM

Programming
- Format: Country
- Affiliations: CBS Radio Network

Ownership
- Owner: Lexington Broadcasting Services, Inc

History
- Former call signs: WDXL-FM (1978–1979)

Technical information
- Licensing authority: FCC
- Facility ID: 37197
- Class: A
- ERP: 5,000 watts
- HAAT: 46 meters (151 ft)
- Transmitter coordinates: 35°38′5.00″N 88°23′34.00″W

Links
- Public license information: Public file; LMS
- Webcast: Listen Live
- Website: wzlt993.com

WZLT (99.3 FM, "New Country 99.3") is a radio station broadcasting a country music format. Licensed to Lexington, Tennessee, United States, the station is currently owned by Lexington Broadcasting Services, Inc. and features programming from CBS Radio Network.
