= WNRX =

- Jefferson City, Tennessee; United States
- Broadcast area: Knoxville, Tennessee
- Frequency: 99.3 MHz
- Branding: 99.3 The Lake

Programming
- Format: Classic rock

Ownership
- Owner: Lakeway Broadcasting, LLC

History
- First air date: February 1, 1977 (as WSBM)
- Former call signs: WSBM (1977–1984); WKJQ (1984–1987); WJFC-FM (1987–1992); WNDD (1992–1994); WUSK (2/1994-9/1994); WEZG (1994–2004)

Technical information
- Licensing authority: FCC
- Facility ID: 18403
- Class: A
- ERP: 950 watts
- HAAT: 84 meters (276 ft)

Links
- Public license information: Public file; LMS

WNRX (99.3 FM) is a radio station in Jefferson City, Tennessee and is owned by Lakeway Broadcasting, LLC and airs a classic rock format. The format is known as 99.3 The Lake.

== History ==
WSBM played gospel music in 1979. WKJQ Q-99 was adult contemporary and WJFC-FM played country music. WNDD played smooth jazz along with WNOX-FM, with the two stations calling themselves "Double 99". Then WNDD played country again with the letters WUSK "US-99". As WEZG, the station was adult contemporary "Easy 99", then CHR "Electric 99", and country once again as "I-99", followed by oldies and Spanish.

According to RadioDiscussions.com, WNRX is currently silent. On April 11, 2014, it was reported that Cumulus Media had sold WNRX to Lakeway Broadcasting for $15,000. On October 22, 2014 WNRX launched a classic rock format. WNRX is currently broadcasting "Classic Rock and Sports" with the sports emphasis being on University of Tennessee and Jefferson County Schools athletics.

The station is an affiliate of the syndicated Pink Floyd program "Floydian Slip."
