= WSCH =

Radio station in Aurora, Indiana, serving Cincinnati, Ohio

- Aurora, Indiana; United States
- Broadcast area: Southeastern Indiana, Boone County and nearby areas of Northern Kentucky, and western Hamilton County, Ohio
- Frequency: 99.3 MHz
- Branding: Eagle Country 99.3

Programming
- Format: Country
- Affiliations: Fox News Radio

Ownership
- Owner: Wagon Wheel Broadcasting, LLC.

History
- First air date: October 29, 1970 (54 Years Ago)

Technical information
- Licensing authority: FCC
- Facility ID: 16256
- Class: A
- ERP: 1,150 Watts
- HAAT: 160 meters (520 ft)
- Transmitter coordinates: 38°57′55″N 84°56′51″W

Links
- Public license information: Public file; LMS
- Webcast: Listen Live
- Website: eaglecountryonline.com

WSCH (99.3 FM) is a radio station broadcasting a Country format. It is licensed to Aurora, Indiana, United States, and serves the Cincinnati area. The station is owned by Wagon Wheel Broadcasting, LLC. The stations transmitter is located near Hartford, Indiana in Ohio County. The stations studios are located at 20 East High Street, in Lawrenceburg, Indiana.
