= Northside Radio =

Northside Radio (2NSB)
- Chatswood, New South Wales; Australia
- Broadcast area: North Shore of Sydney
- Frequency: FM: 99.3 MHz

Programming
- Language: English
- Format: Community radio
- Affiliations: CBAA

Ownership
- Owner: Northside Broadcasting Inc.

History
- First air date: May 1983
- Former frequencies: 91.5 MHz
- Call sign meaning: Northside Broadcasting

Technical information
- Licensing authority: ACMA
- ERP: 200 watts
- Transmitter coordinates: 33.795617°S 151.185329°E

Links
- Public licence information: Profile

Northside Radio 99.3 is a radio station based in Chatswood, Sydney, Australia. The station operates on the FM 99.3 frequency and is referred to as Northside Radio 99.3FM on-air and for business purposes. The station transmits to Sydney's North Shore, covering the Willoughby, Lane Cove, North Sydney, Mosman and Ku-ring-gai Council areas.

== Programming ==
Northside Radio 99.3 plays a wide range of Aussie music and genres from soul, funk, jazz and blues to electronic, rock, pop and dance, as well as Latin and world music.

In late 2026 it adopted the tagline 'the rhythm of the North Shore'.

The station also offers programs in languages other than English.

== Events ==
The station hosts an annual Radiothon, which is the station's main on air funding generator. During Radiothon, Northside Radio offers prizes for those who choose to subscribe to the station.

Northside Radio FM99.3 holds various Outside Broadcasts (OBs) throughout the year, supporting local community events such as The Emerge Festival, The Bobbin Head Classic Charity Bike Ride and The St Ives Food and Wine Festival.

== Organisation ==
The station is managed by a committee of nine volunteer members, currently Phil Dobbie (chair), Terry Hogan (secretary), Kennedy Potter (treasurer), John Ogier, April Pressler, Merren Regan, Brian Haverty, Shaun Alexander and Guy Brooks.

The station is operated by around 50 volunteers many of whom are presenters and/or program producers.

The station is funded by business sponsors, donations and grants as well as subscribers and supporters of the station.

== History ==
The station received its incorporation certificate on 12 October 1981 and began broadcasting in May 1983 from East Chatswood, transmitting to Sydney's North Shore - an area that covers the Willoughby, Lane Cove, North Sydney, Mosman and Ku-ring-gai Council areas. The station transferred it's incorporation to become an incorporated association on 1 September 2023.

The station was originally broadcasting on FM91.5, playing from a jazz-oriented playlist. Following a move to the FM99.3 frequency in 2003, the station was re-branded Rhythm & Jazz, encompassing a range of genres from traditional jazz to smooth jazz, funk, soul, blues and world music.

From January 2010 the station began restructuring its programs and music content to reflect the expressed wishes of the North Shore community. This was confirmed during a 2011 survey of listeners, supporters and subscribers, who asked for more music they couldn't hear anywhere else, music that was not played on other radio stations and more local news, views and matters of local interest.

A grant in 2014 allowed the station to add a second studio (Studio 2), enabling presenters to broadcast live to air in one studio, while people conducted interviews or recorded programs in the other.
