= WBWH-LP =

Radio station at Bluffton University in Bluffton, Ohio

Coordinates: 40.897°N 83.903°W

- Bluffton, Ohio; United States
- Broadcast area: The Village of Bluffton and its surrounding communities between Lima, Ohio and Findlay, Ohio
- Frequency: 96.1 MHz
- Branding: "Smooth 96-1" "New Rock Alternative 96-1"

Programming
- Format: Smooth jazz with soul, R&B, sophisti-pop, chill, nu-jazz, & acid jazz (Primary) alternative rock/modern rock (Secondary)

Ownership
- Owner: Bluffton University; (Bluffton College)

History
- First air date: 2003
- Call sign meaning: Beavers With Headphones

Technical information
- Licensing authority: FCC
- Class: L1
- ERP: 66 watts
- HAAT: 37 meters (121 ft)

Links
- Public license information: LMS
- Webcast: Listen Live
- Website: BlufftonConnection.com

WBWH-LP is a low-power FM radio station operating at 96.1 MHz in Bluffton, Ohio. It is the campus and community radio station owned and operated by Bluffton University. WBWH-LP offers a diversified programming schedule geared to university students and the residents of Bluffton. Its power output of 66 watts serves the community of Bluffton exclusively. WBWH-LP broadcasts many of the athletic events on campus, including football, volleyball, basketball, and baseball games. The call letters WBWH-LP stand for Beavers With Headphones-a tribute to the Bluffton mascot, which is a beaver.

== 96.1 WBWH Your Bluffton Connection ==
WBWH-LP's primary music format is New AC (NAC)/Smooth Jazz (making it the only station in Northwest Ohio to have Smooth Jazz as its primary format). During this format, Smooth Jazz is the basis and Vocals from a wide variety of genres such as sophisti-pop, blue-eyed soul, and R&B/soul music as well as chill or chill-out music along with nu-jazz and acid Jazz is normally sprinkled in. WBWH-LP flipped to the Smooth Jazz format in October 2011. As of August 18, 2012 WBWH-LP brands its Smooth Jazz-based programming as "Smooth 96.1."

WBWH-LP reports its Smooth Jazz playlist to SmoothJazz.com weekly. More specifics on the music and segments heard on WBWH-LP can be found at its website.

WBWH-LP switched frequencies from 99.3 FM to 96.1 FM. The switch took place on August 18, 2012. WBWH-LP went off the air August 18, 2012, and returned to the airwaves at 96.1 FM on August 24, 2012.

=== Syndicated shows produced at WBWH-LP ===
WBWH is currently the place of production for two internationally syndicated radio shows. The first show to be syndicated from WBWH-LP was The Chillout Sessions, hosted by Donald Isaac. The Chillout Sessions is heard on many online and FM stations in places such as New York City, Orlando, Cincinnati, London, Nicosia, Cyprus, Newcastle upon Tyne, in addition to West Virginia. Most recently, The Alternative Project, hosted by Evan Skilliter, became the second show to be syndicated from WBWH-LP. The Alternative Project is currently heard on many FM and online stations in locations such as Porirua, New Zealand, Boston, and West Virginia.

=== The Smooth 96.1 ===
Smooth 96.1 strives to keep the sounds of Smooth Jazz as the noticeable basis when the format is on the air. This means that the basis of what is played will be Smooth Jazz instrumentals, and the other songs will be Smooth Vocals (from a wide variety of genres, listed above) as well as Chill and Nu-Jazz tracks. Smooth 96.1 does not strive to play Adult Contemporary and Urban Adult Contemporary songs as its basis as some former Smooth Jazz stations are currently doing, as seen here: Smooth Jazz Stations turning into Smooth AC stations. Smooth 96.1 currently serves as Northwest Ohio's only Smooth Jazz based station.

=== Sample Playlist During The Smooth 96.1 Format ===
- "Private Party" - Pamela Williams
- "Shine" - John Legend
- "Camden Town" - Marc Antoine
- "By The Fireplace" - Brian Bromberg
- "Look Again" - Nelson Rangell
- "In My Bed" - Amy Winehouse
- "Shine" - Chieli Minucci
- "Roll On" - Four80East
- "It's Go Time" - Pieces of a Dream
- "Running" - Jessie Ware
- "Ooh La La" - Jeff Lorber
- "Talkin' Bout Love" - Peter White
- "Sure Thing" - St. Germain
- "Listen To Your Heart" - Alicia Keys
