= KLOR-FM =

- Ponca City, Oklahoma; United States
- Broadcast area: Ponca City, Oklahoma
- Frequency: 99.3 MHz
- Branding: KLOR 99.3

Programming
- Format: Classic hits

Ownership
- Owner: Team Radio LLC

History
- First air date: 1965

Technical information
- Licensing authority: FCC
- Facility ID: 52678
- Class: A
- ERP: 3,000 watts
- HAAT: 88 meters (289 ft)
- Transmitter coordinates: 36.78306°N 97.07083°W

Links
- Public license information: Public file; LMS
- Webcast: Listen live
- Website: www.poncacitynow.com

KLOR-FM (99.3 MHz) is a radio station licensed to Ponca City, Oklahoma. The station broadcasts a classic hits format and is owned by Team Radio LLC.

Previous logo
