= KWBR-LP =

KWBR
- St. George, Utah; United States
- Frequency: 105.7 MHz
- Branding: Smooth Jazz 105.7

Programming
- Format: Smooth jazz

Ownership
- Owner: Association of Community Resources and News

History
- First air date: 2003

Technical information
- Licensing authority: FCC
- Facility ID: 123781
- Class: L1
- ERP: 250watts
- HAAT: 125.1 meters (410 ft)
- Transmitter coordinates: 37°3′48″N 113°34′23″W

Links
- Public license information: Public file; LMS
- Webcast: Listen Live
- Website: KWBR-LP Website

KWBR (105.7 FM) is a radio station broadcasting a Smooth Jazz music format. Licensed to St. George, Utah, United States, the station is currently owned by Association of Community Resources and News (A.C.O.R.N.). Voted America's Top Smooth Jazz Radio Station. America's Top Voice Talent on line at www.smoothjazzutah.com
