= WSBZ =

- Miramar Beach, Florida; United States
- Broadcast area: Fort Walton Beach metropolitan area
- Frequency: 106.3 MHz
- Branding: Seabreeze 106.3

Programming
- Format: Smooth jazz
- Affiliations: Compass Media Networks; United Stations Radio Networks

Ownership
- Owner: Carter Broadcasting, Inc.

History
- First air date: October 18, 1994
- Call sign meaning: Sea BreeZe

Technical information
- Licensing authority: FCC
- Facility ID: 40200
- Class: A
- ERP: 6,000 watts
- HAAT: 100 meters
- Transmitter coordinates: 30°23′7″N 86°18′3″W

Links
- Public license information: Public file; LMS
- Webcast: Listen live
- Website: seabreezelive.com

WSBZ (106.3 FM) is a commercial radio station broadcasting a smooth jazz format. Licensed to Miramar Beach, Florida, United States, the station serves the Ft Walton Beach metropolitan area. The station is owned by Carter Broadcasting, Inc.

The studios and offices are on Bay Drive in Santa Rosa Beach, Florida and the transmitter is near Mack Bayou Road.

Former logo
