= WXRA =

- Inglis, Florida; United States
- Frequency: 99.3 MHz

Programming
- Format: Christian Worship
- Affiliations: Air1

Ownership
- Owner: Educational Media Foundation

Technical information
- Licensing authority: FCC
- Facility ID: 164174
- Class: A
- ERP: 3,700 watts
- HAAT: 128 meters (420 ft)
- Transmitter coordinates: 29°09′19.91″N 82°27′0.36″W

Links
- Public license information: Public file; LMS
- Webcast: Listen Live
- Website: air1.com

WXRA (99.3 FM) is a radio station licensed to Inglis, Florida, United States and airing a Christian worship format with programming from Air1. The station is currently owned by Educational Media Foundation
