= Bay FM 99.3 =

Bay FM 88.0

Australia
- Broadcast area: Tomaree and Tilligerry peninsulas of Port Stephens, New South Wales, Australia
- Frequency: 88.0 MHz

Programming
- Language: English
- Format: Classic hits

History
- First air date: 29 April 1998
- Former frequencies: 98.3 MHz (1998–2003) 99.3 MHz (2003–2015)

Technical information
- HAAT: 170 m (558 ft)
- Transmitter coordinates: 32°43′58.8″S 152°7′47.8″E

Links
- Webcast: Listen Live
- Website: bayfmnelsonbay.net radiobayfm.com.au

Bay FM 88.0 is a narrowcast FM radio station serving the Tomaree and Tilligerry Peninsulas of Port Stephens in New South Wales, Australia. The station's licence was granted on 29 April 1998 and it transmits from Gan Gan Hill in Nelson Bay. Originally broadcasting on 98.3 MHz, the station's frequency was changed to 99.3 MHz on 8 August 2003. The frequency was changed again on 26 February 2015 to 88.0 MHz.
