= WAJH =

Smooth jazz radio station in Birmingham, Alabama, United States

- Birmingham, Alabama; United States
- Frequency: 91.1 MHz
- Branding: Jazz Hall Radio

Programming
- Format: Jazz

Ownership
- Owner: Alabama Jazz Hall of Fame, Inc.

History
- First air date: December 1, 1978
- Former call signs: WVSU-FM (1978–2018)
- Call sign meaning: Alabama Jazz Hall of Fame

Technical information
- Licensing authority: FCC
- Facility ID: 58757
- Class: A
- ERP: 400 watts
- HAAT: 126 meters 420 feet
- Transmitter coordinates: 33°27′N 86°48′W

Links
- Public license information: Public file; LMS
- Webcast: Listen live
- Website: jazzhall.com

WAJH (91.1 FM) is a non-commercial, listener-supported radio station licensed to Birmingham, Alabama, and owned and operated by the Alabama Jazz Hall of Fame, Inc. The station broadcasts smooth jazz and other music programs. The station's antenna is located on Shades Mountain in Homewood, Alabama. The broadcast studio is on the Samford University campus.

The station's owner is the nonprofit corporation that operates the Alabama Jazz Hall of Fame, located in the Carver Theatre in Birmingham.

== History ==
The station began operating in 1978 as WVSU-FM. It was staffed by students in the Samford University journalism and mass communication program, under the direction of a hired general manager. In 2007, WVSU became the flagship station of a newly formed Samford University sports radio network.

The Alabama Jazz Hall of Fame began operating the station on February 1, 2018, under a "Program Servicing Agreement" with Samford University. Effective May 3, 2018, Samford University sold WVSU-FM to the Alabama Jazz Hall of Fame, Inc. for $50,000. The new licensee changed the station's call sign to WAJH the same day.
