= WBTV-LP =

Low-power FM radio station in Burlington, Vermont

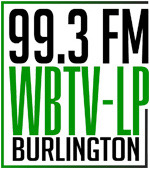

Burlington, Vermont; United States
- Frequency: 99.3 MHz
- Branding: 99.3 WBTV-LP

Programming
- Format: Variety
- Affiliations: Pacifica Network

Ownership
- Owner: Vermont Community Access Media (VCAM)

History
- First air date: September 8, 2017
- Call sign meaning: Burlington, Vermont

Technical information
- Licensing authority: FCC
- Facility ID: 192571
- Class: L1
- ERP: 100 watts
- HAAT: −14.1 meters (−46 ft)
- Transmitter coordinates: 44°27′23.1″N 73°13′3.4″W

Links
- Public license information: LMS
- Webcast: Listen live
- Website: 993wbtv.org

WBTV-LP (99.3 FM) is a radio station licensed to serve the community of Burlington, Vermont. The station is owned by Vermont Community Access Media (VCAM). It airs a variety radio format.

The station was assigned the WBTV-LP call letters by the Federal Communications Commission on December 2, 2014. It signed on September 8, 2017, though its programming had already been available through an Internet radio feed for nearly a year.
