= KRWV-LP =

- Gold Canyon, Arizona; United States
- Frequency: 99.3 MHz
- Branding: 99.3 The Wave

Programming
- Format: Smooth jazz

Ownership
- Owner: Gold Canyon Public Radio, Inc.

History
- First air date: 2014
- Call sign meaning: "Wave"

Technical information
- Licensing authority: FCC
- Facility ID: 191648
- Class: L1
- ERP: 100 watts
- HAAT: −52 meters (−171 ft)
- Transmitter coordinates: 33°20′31″N 111°25′58″W

Links
- Public license information: LMS
- Webcast: Listen live
- Website: www.krwv.org

KRWV-LP is a low-power FM radio station in Gold Canyon, Arizona. Broadcasting on 99.3 FM, KRWV is owned by Gold Canyon Public Radio and carries a smooth jazz format known as 99.3 The Wave.
