= Cordelia (disambiguation) =

Cordelia is a given name, most notably referring to:

- Cordelia (King Lear), a character in Shakespeare's play King Lear

Cordelia may also refer to:

== Arts and entertainment ==
- Cordélia (film), a 1980 Canadian film directed by Jean Beaudin
- Monte Carlo (2011 film), an American adventure rom-com
- Cordelia (2019 film), a British film starring Michael Gambon
- Cordelia (novel), a 1949 novel by Winston Graham
- Cordelia, a comics series by Ilah
- "Cordelia", a song by the Tragically Hip from Road Apples, 1991

== Places ==
- Cordelia, Queensland, Australia
- Cordelia, California, US
- Cordelia, Ohio, US
- Cordelia Township, Bottineau County, North Dakota, US
- Cordelia A. Culbertson House, on the US National Register of Historic Places in Pasadena, California
- Cordelia Lutheran Church, on the US National Register of Historic Places in Latah County, Idaho
- Cordelia Slough, a tidal watercourse in California

== Science ==
- Cordelia (moon), a moon of Uranus
- 2758 Cordelia, an asteroid

== Other uses ==
- Cordelia (butterfly), a genus of butterflies
- HMS Cordelia, four ships of the Royal Navy

== See also ==
- "Cordelia Malone", a song by Billy Jerome and Jean Schwartz, 1904
- Cordelia's Dad, American band
