= List of memorials to Martin Van Buren =

Among the memorials to Martin Van Buren, the eighth president of the United States, are the following:

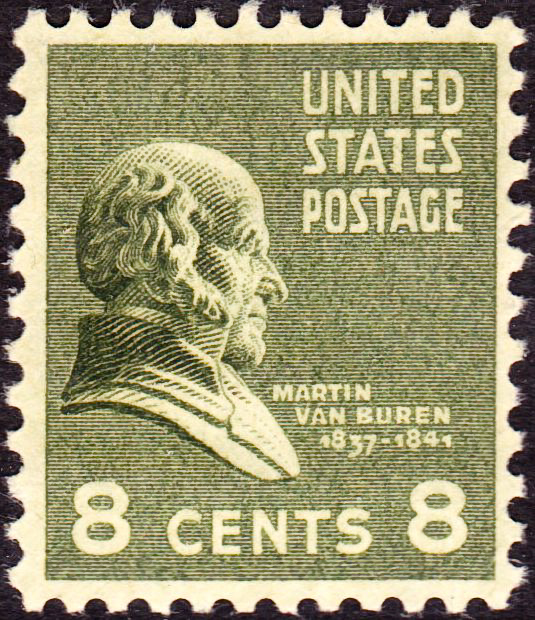
Martin Van Buren appears on the 8-cent U.S. postage stamp of the 1938 Presidential Issue.

== Homes ==
Van Buren's home in Kinderhook, New York, which he called Lindenwald, is now the Martin Van Buren National Historic Site. Lindenwald remained a privately owned residence, and eventually passed out of the hands of the Van Buren family. It was declared a National Historic Landmark in 1961, and was established as a National Historic Site under the care of the National Park Service in 1974.

In 1936, the New York State Education Department installed a commemorative plaque at 90 State Street in Albany, the site of Van Buren's residence during his service as governor of New York.

== Counties ==
Counties are named for Martin Van Buren in Michigan, Iowa, Arkansas, and Tennessee. Cass County, Missouri was originally named for Van Buren, and was renamed in 1849 to honor Lewis Cass because Missouri allowed slavery, and Van Buren had opposed slavery as the presidential candidate of the Free Soil Party in 1848.

== Cities and towns ==
Cities and towns named for Van Buren include:

Arkansas

- Van Buren, Arkansas

Indiana

- Van Buren, Indiana
- Van Buren Township, Clay County, Indiana
- Van Buren Township, Brown County, Indiana
- Van Buren Township, Monroe County, Indiana
- Van Buren Township, Grant County, Indiana
- Van Buren Township, Pulaski County, Indiana
- Van Buren Township, Fountain County, Indiana
- Van Buren Township, LaGrange County, Indiana
- Van Buren Township, Madison County, Indiana
- Van Buren Township, Kosciusko County, Indiana
- Van Buren Township, Daviess County, Indiana
- Van Buren Township, Shelby County, Indiana
- In addition, Van Buren Township in LaPorte County, Indiana was later merged with Noble Township.

Iowa

- Van Buren Township, Jackson County, Iowa; Van Buren Township, Lee County, Iowa

Kentucky

- Van Buren, Anderson County. This small community was abandoned due to the construction and flooding of Taylorsville Lake from 1974 to 1983.

Louisiana

- Van Buren, Livingston Parish. The original parish seat, it is now abandoned.

Maine

- Van Buren, Maine

Michigan

- Van Buren Charter Township, Michigan
- Also, Martin, Michigan (Allegan County), and the now-defunct village of Martinsville in Sumpter Township were named for him.

Missouri

- Van Buren, Missouri

Minnesota

- Van Buren Township, St. Louis County, Minnesota

Mississippi

- Van Buren, Mississippi (defunct)

New York

- Van Buren, New York

Ohio

- Van Buren (a village in Hancock County)
- Van Buren Township, Shelby County, Ohio. This township started to be populated by white settlers in the early 1830s. It was incorporated in 1835, and its government organized in 1841.
- Van Buren Township, Putnam County, Ohio. Originally part of Blanchard Township, it was surveyed in 1821, became home to its first white settlers in 1835, and was organized in 1843.
- Van Buren Township, Darke County, Ohio
- Van Buren Township, Hancock County, Ohio

Tennessee

- Van Buren, Hardeman County (unincorporated) Established in 1831, this unincorporated populated area is located at the intersection of Van Buren and Lake Hardeman Roads, and shares a ZIP code with Hickory Valley.

Wisconsin

- Van Buren, Grant County In 1841 this unincorporated area was combined with unincorporated areas named for Lafayette and Osceola to form the incorporated town of Potosi.

== State parks ==
Van Buren State Park and Van Buren Trail State Park in Michigan, and Ohio's Van Buren State Park and its Van Buren Lake are named for him.

== Mountains ==
Mount Van Buren on the Palmer Land portion of Antarctica was named for Martin Van Buren.

== Islands ==
Van Buren Island in the St. Lawrence River, part of the Thousand Islands, sits at latitude 44.404339N, 75.892119W. Though named for the U.S. president, this island is in Canadian waters.

== Ships ==
USS Van Buren, a United States Navy schooner in service from 1839 to 1847 was also named for Martin Van Buren.

== Schools ==
- Van Buren Elementary School, located in Groves, Texas. Part of the Port Neches-Groves Independent School District.
- Martin Van Buren High School, Queens Village, New York
- Martin Van Buren Elementary School, located on Van Buren Street in Indio, California.

== See also ==
- Presidential memorials in the United States
