= Van Buren High School (Ohio) =

Location
- 217 South Main Street; Van Buren, (Hancock County), Ohio 45889; United States
- Coordinates: 41°8′8″N 83°38′54″W

Information
- Type: Public, Coeducational high school
- School district: Van Buren Local Schools
- Superintendent: Jason Inkrott
- Principal: Kevin Shoup
- Teaching staff: 22.00 (FTE)
- Grades: 9-12
- Enrollment: 316 (2023-2024)
- Student to teacher ratio: 14.36
- Colors: Orange and Black
- Athletics conference: Blanchard Valley Conference
- Mascot: Kylo The Knight
- Nickname: Knights
- Team name: Black Knights
- Rival: Liberty-Benton, North Baltimore
- Newspaper: The Knight Writer
- Yearbook: The Knight
- Website: https://www.vbschools.net/

Van Buren High School is a public high school in Van Buren, Ohio, the only high school in the Van Buren Local Schools district. They are a member of the Blanchard Valley Conference.

== History ==
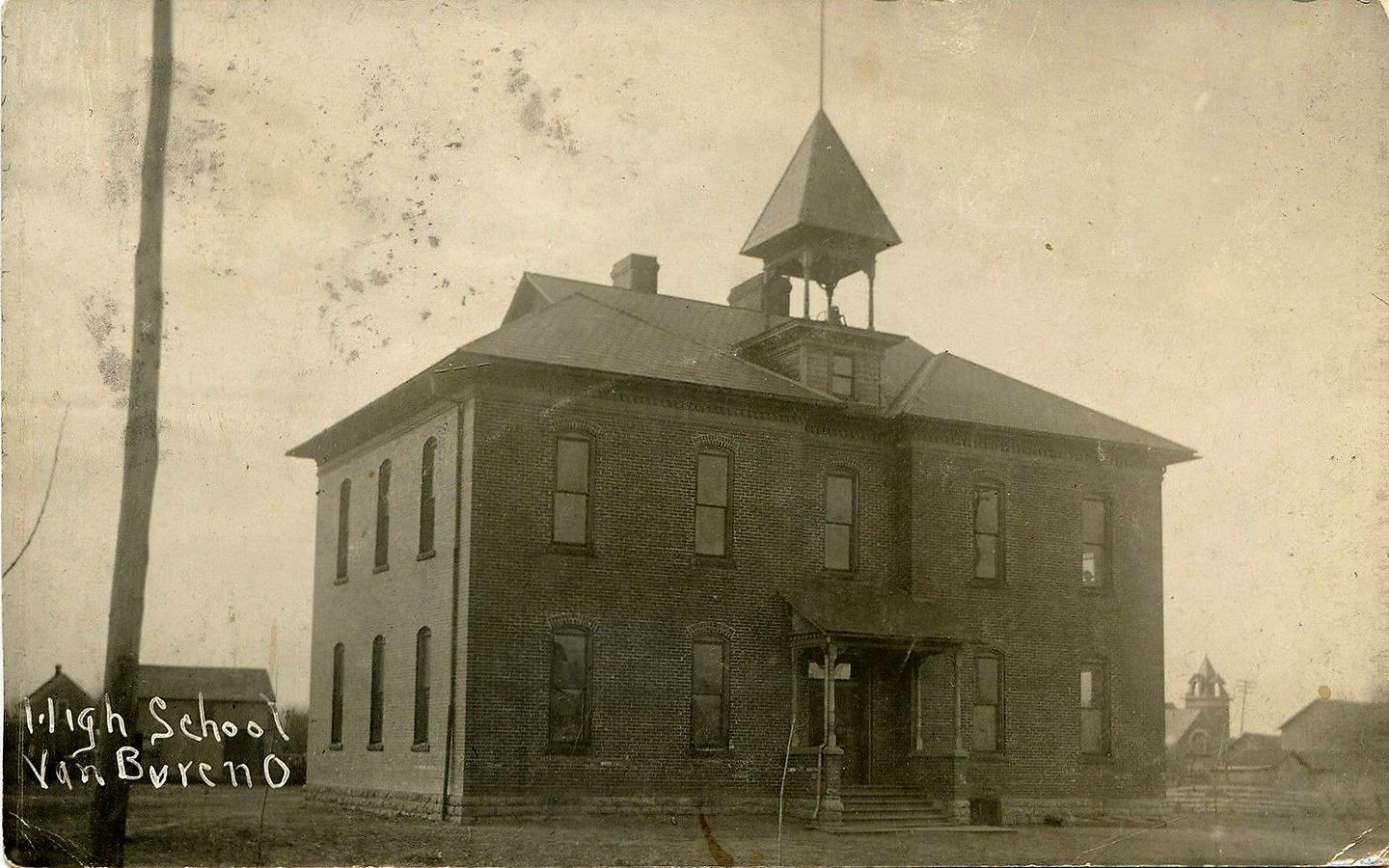
The four-room school building used till 1917

The first schoolhouse in Allen Township was a small log structure built in 1836. It was built of round logs covered with a clapboard roof, had greased paper windows and a huge fireplace at one end. About 1870 a two-room brick building was built on East Market Street. This building was later condemned and a four-room school was erected and used till 1917 when the schools of Allen Township were centralized and the present school, Van Buren High School, was erected.

In the fall of 2017 Van Buren Schools had a centennial celebration of the 1917 addition still in use today.

== Ohio High School Athletic Association State Championships ==
- Boys Golf – 1984, 1990

== Athletics ==
The Black Knights compete in the following sports:

- Football (Division VI)
- Soccer (Boys' and Girls' - Division III)
- Golf (Boys and the first Girls team in the history of Hancock County)
- Cross Country (Boys' and Girls')
- Volleyball (Girls' - Division III)
- Basketball (Boys' and Girls' - Division III)
- Wrestling (Boys', was coed 2004-2005)
- Track & Field (Boys' and Girls')
- Baseball (Division III)
- Softball (Division IV)
- Indoor Track

The Black Knight Football team won the Valley Division of the BVC in 2014 & 2015 and advanced to the state playoffs each of the last 2 seasons with 3 playoff wins to their credit.

The Black Knights are well known for their success on the golf course, in which they have won or shared a BVC title since 2007. The Black Knights have also advanced to the state tournament in 2010, 2011, 2012, 2013, 2014, 2015, 2016 receiving State Runner Up in 2016.

The Boys Soccer team won the North Central Ohio Soccer Association League Title in 2015, 2016, and 2017.

== Musical tradition ==
Van Buren High School is known in Ohio for its music department, mainly in vocals. The concert choir has received multiple Superior ratings at state contest. Along with the choir, Van Buren is home of the decorated show choir group "The Association," which competed in class C. Although The Association is no longer a competitive ensemble, they still remain quite active in the community and now perform multiple shows each year including: Fall Show, Christmas Show, and their annual Spring Cabaret. In the fall of 2018, an a cappella group known as Knightlife Acappella (KLA) was created by their choir director, Will Baughman. The ensemble is composed of The Association's 17 most elite musicians.

The Van Buren Black Knight Marching Band on November 6, 2009, traveled to Dublin, OH to compete in State Marching Band Finals for the first time in Van Buren history. They received a "II" (Excellent) rating and missed a "I" (Superior) rating by one point. The BKMB has since competed at State Finals five times: 2014, 2015, 2016, 2017, 2018, and 2019.

== Notable alumni ==
- Doug Martin, PGA golfer 1992,1994–99
- Michael Holmes (saxophonist), acclaimed saxophonist
- Ryan Parker (Musician/Actor)
