= Cannonsburg =

Cannonsburg can refer to a place in the United States:

- Cannonsburg, Kentucky
- Cannonsburg, Michigan
- Cannonsburg, Ohio

See also

- Canonsburg, Pennsylvania
