= Portage Center, Ohio =

Unincorporated community in Ohio, U.S.

Coordinates: 41°07′27″N 83°43′38″W

Portage Center is an unincorporated community in Hancock County, in the U.S. state of Ohio.

== History ==
A post office called Portage Centre was established in 1857, the name was changed to Portage Center in 1893, and the post office closed in 1900. The community has the name of the township in which it is located, Portage Township.
