= Mortimer, Ohio =

Unincorporated community in Ohio, U.S.

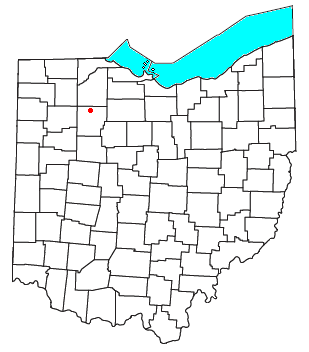
- Location of Mortimer, Ohio
- Coordinates: 41°06′34″N 83°39′01″W
- Established: 1883
- Founder: Addison Silverwood

Mortimer is an unincorporated community located in central Allen Township, Hancock County, Ohio, United States. It sits between the village of Van Buren to the north and the city of Findlay to the south.

== History ==
Mortimer was originally called Silverwood, and under the latter name was laid out in 1883 by Addison Silverwood, and named for him. A post office called Mortimer was established in 1883, and remained in operation until 1911.
