= Shawtown =

Shawtown may refer to:

- Shawtown, North Carolina, an unincorporated community
- Shawtown, Hancock County, Ohio, an unincorporated community
- Shawtown, Morrow County, Ohio, an unincorporated community
- Shawtown, Wisconsin, a former community now a neighborhood in Eau Claire, Wisconsin
