= Van Buren State Park =

Van Buren State Park can refer to:

- Van Buren State Park (Michigan)
- Van Buren State Park (Ohio)
