= Amanda Township, Ohio =

Amanda Township, Ohio may refer to:

- Amanda Township, Allen County, Ohio
- Amanda Township, Fairfield County, Ohio
- Amanda Township, Hancock County, Ohio
