= Deweyville =

Deweyville may refer to:

- Deweyville, California, former name of Wasco, California
- Deweyville, Ohio
- Deweyville, Texas
- Deweyville, Utah
