= Blanchard Township =

Blanchard Township may refer to:

- Blanchard Township, Hancock County, Ohio
- Blanchard Township, Hardin County, Ohio
- Blanchard Township, Putnam County, Ohio
