= Martin Memorial =

Martin Memorial may refer to the following:

== Buildings and structures ==
- Ava Bill Martin Memorial Airport in Ava, Missouri
- Josephine Martin Glidden Memorial Chapel in Sioux Falls, South Dakota
- Kuala Klawang Memorial in Kuala Klawang, Malaysia; also known as the Martin Lister Memorial
- Malcolm W. Martin Memorial Park in East St. Louis, Illinois

== Sculptures ==
- Death and the Sculptor, a bronze sculpture also known as the Martin Milmore Memorial
- General Jose de San Martin Memorial

== See also ==
- Martin Luther King Jr. Memorial
- Martin Luther King Jr. Memorial Library
- Memorials to Martin Luther King Jr.
- List of streets named after Martin Luther King Jr.
- List of memorials to Martin Van Buren
