= Liberty Township, Hancock County, Ohio =

Township in Ohio, US

- Township
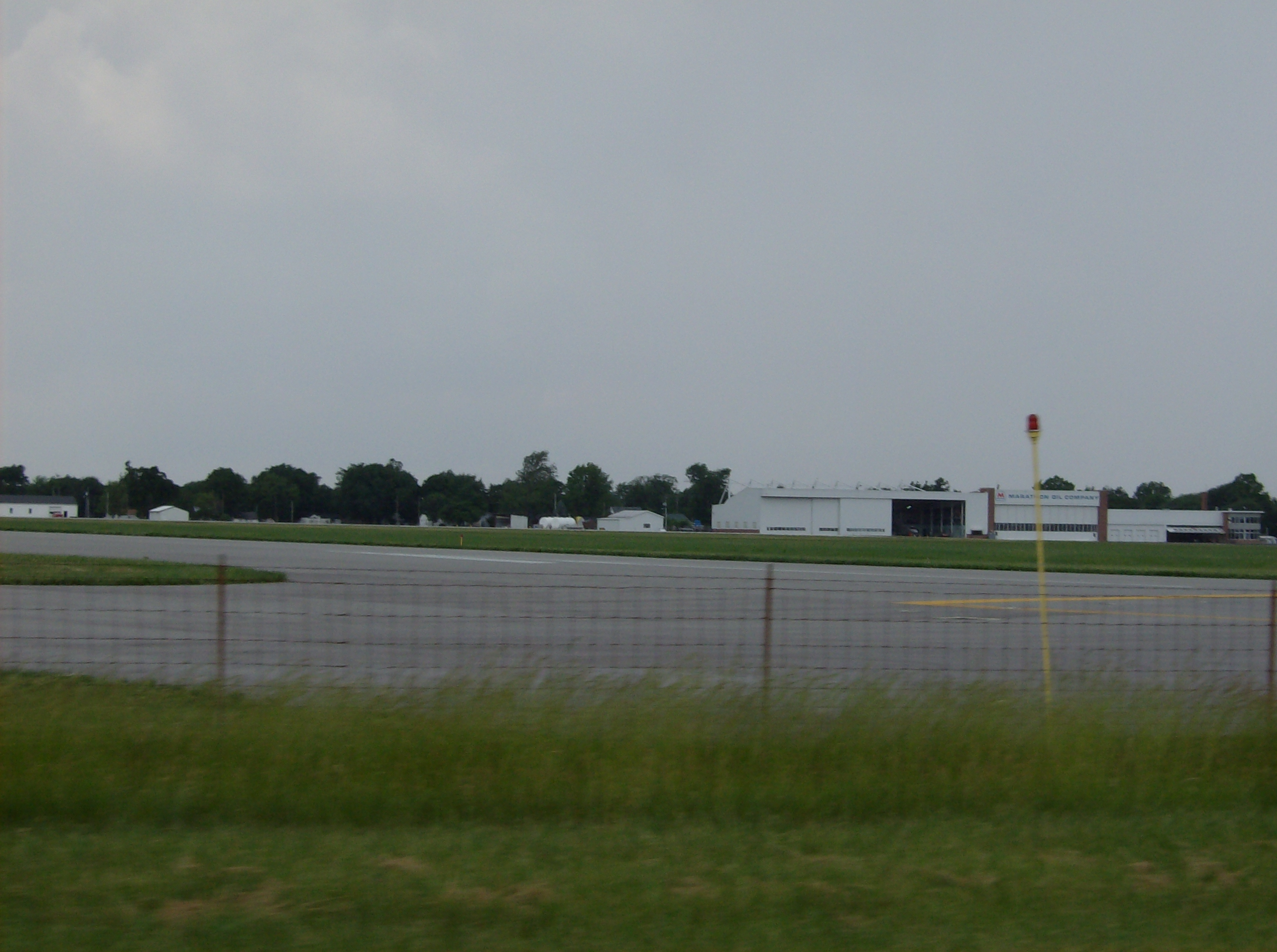
- Overview of Findlay Airport

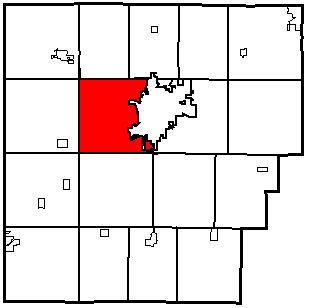
- Location of Liberty Township in Hancock County
- Coordinates: 41°2′23″N 83°41′55″W
- Country: United States
- State: Ohio
- County: Hancock

Area
  - Total: 29.3 sq mi (76.0 km^{2})
  - Land: 29.3 sq mi (75.9 km^{2})
  - Water: 0.039 sq mi (0.1 km^{2})
- Elevation: 764 ft (233 m)

Population (2020)
  - Total: 7,044
  - Density: 240/sq mi (92.8/km^{2})
- Time zone: UTC-5 (Eastern (EST))
  - Summer (DST): UTC-4 (EDT)
- FIPS code: 39-43148
- GNIS feature ID: 1086247
- Website: libertytwphan.org

Liberty Township is one of the seventeen townships of Hancock County, Ohio, United States. As of the 2020 census, the population was 7,044. Liberty Township Has a fire department Called Liberty TWP FD and has a highschool named Liberty Benton Highshcool

== Geography ==
Located in the central part of the county, it borders the following municipalities:

- Portage Township - north
- Allen Township - northeast
- City of Findlay - east (county seat)
- Jackson Township - southeast corner
- Eagle Township - south
- Union Township - southwest corner
- Blanchard Township - west
- Pleasant Township - northwest corner

== Name and history ==
It is one of twenty-five Liberty Townships statewide.

== Parks ==
Liberty township has two Hancock Park District parks, Litzenberg Memorial Woods and Oakwoods Nature Preserve. In addition, it has the Liberty Landing canoe access to the Blanchard River. The 20-mile Heritage Trail runs through Liberty township.

== Government ==
The township is governed by a three-member board of trustees, who are elected in November of odd-numbered years to a four-year term beginning on the following January 1. Two are elected in the year after the presidential election and one is elected in the year before it. There is also an elected township fiscal officer, who serves a four-year term beginning on April 1 of the year after the election, which is held in November of the year before the presidential election. Vacancies in the fiscal officership or on the board of trustees are filled by the remaining trustees.
