= Allen Township, Ohio =

Allen Township, Ohio, may refer to:

- Allen Township, Darke County, Ohio
- Allen Township, Hancock County, Ohio
- Allen Township, Ottawa County, Ohio
- Allen Township, Union County, Ohio
