= KFDY =

KFDY may refer to:

- Findlay Airport (ICAO code KFDY)
- KFDY-LD, a low-power television station (channel 27, virtual 27) licensed to serve Lincoln, Nebraska, United States
