= FDY =

FDY may refer to:

- Findlay Airport, serving Findlay, Ohio, United States
- Southern Airways Express, an American airline
- Sun Air Express, a defunct American airline
