= Hoytville, Ohio =

- Village
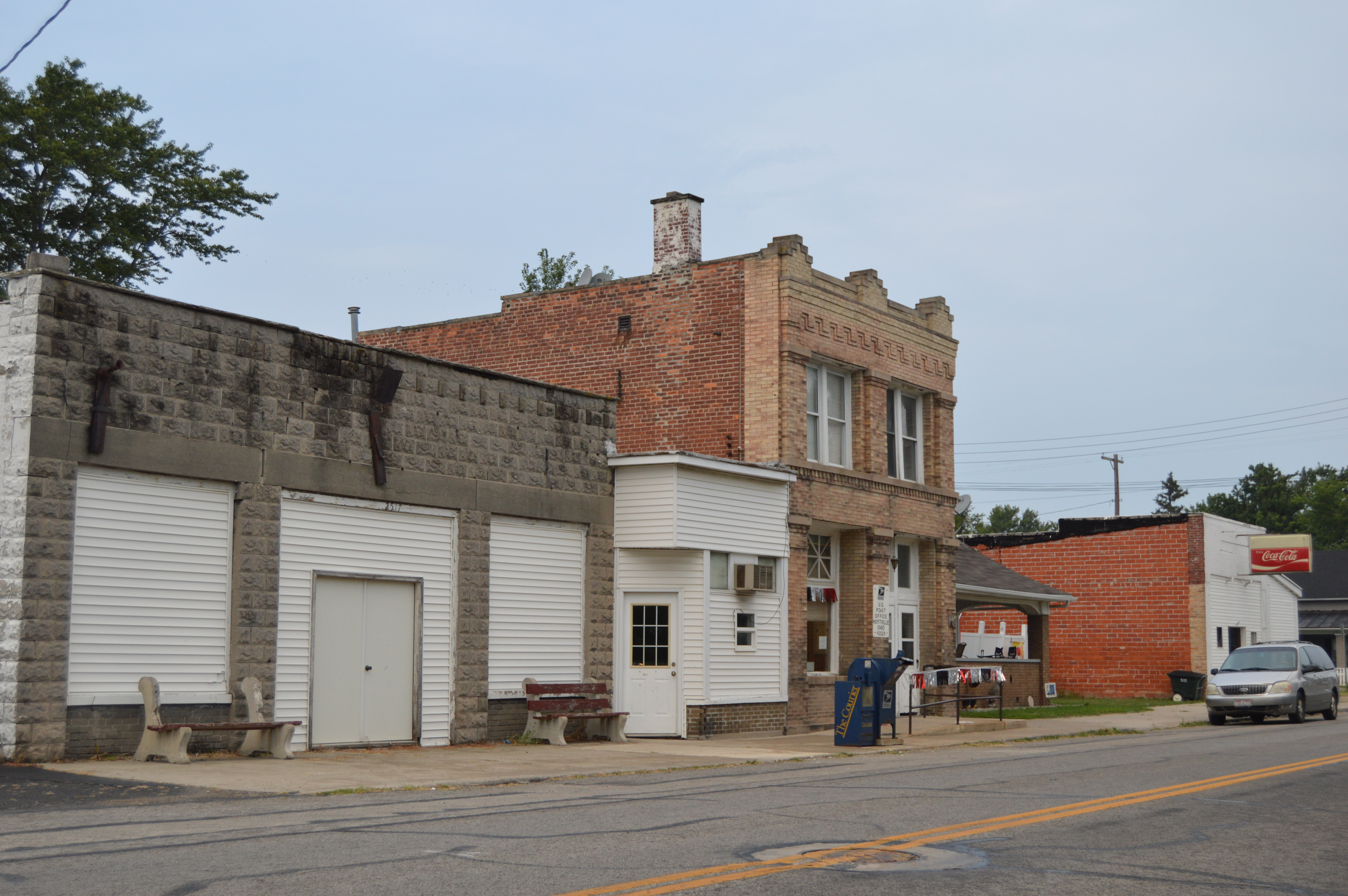
- Main Street (State Routes 18/235)

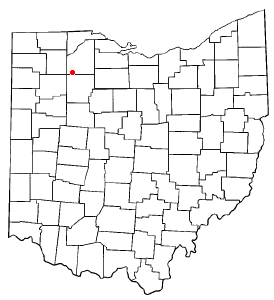
- Location of Hoytville, Ohio

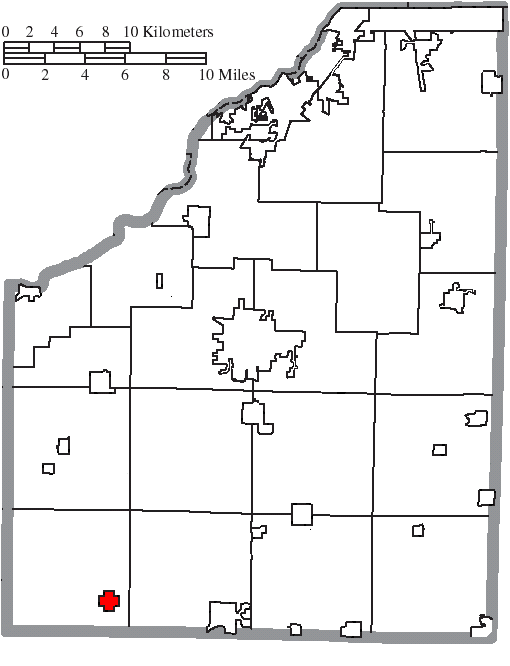
- Location of Hoytville in Wood County
- Coordinates: 41°11′24″N 83°47′04″W
- Country: United States
- State: Ohio
- County: Wood
- Township: Jackson

Area
  - Total: 0.75 sq mi (1.95 km^{2})
  - Land: 0.74 sq mi (1.92 km^{2})
  - Water: 0.012 sq mi (0.03 km^{2})
- Elevation: 709 ft (216 m)

Population (2020)
  - Total: 220
  - Density: 296.7/sq mi (114.57/km^{2})
- Time zone: UTC-5 (Eastern (EST))
  - Summer (DST): UTC-4 (EDT)
- ZIP code: 43529
- Area code: 419
- FIPS code: 39-36568
- GNIS feature ID: 2398551

Hoytville is a village in Wood County, Ohio, United States. The population was 220 at the 2020 census.

== History ==
Hoytville was platted in 1873 when the railroad was extended to that point. The village was named after William Hoyt, an original proprietor of the town site. A former variant name was Hoyts Corners. A post office called Hoyts Corners was established in 1872, and the name was changed to Hoytville in 1874. The village was incorporated in 1886.

== Geography ==
According to the United States Census Bureau, the village has a total area of 0.75 square miles (1.94 km^{2}), of which 0.74 square miles (1.92 km^{2}) is land and 0.01 square miles (0.03 km^{2}) is water.

== Demographics ==
Historical population
Census	Pop.	Note	%±
1890	395		—
1900	431		9.1%
1910	404		−6.3%
1920	367		−9.2%
1930	341		−7.1%
1940	361		5.9%
1950	340		−5.8%
1960	334		−1.8%
1970	403		20.7%
1980	315		−21.8%
1990	301		−4.4%
2000	296		−1.7%
2010	303		2.4%
2020	220		−27.4%
U.S. Decennial Census

=== 2010 census ===
As of the census of 2010, there were 303 people, 96 households, and 77 families living in the village. The population density was 409.5 inhabitants per square mile (158.1/km^{2}). There were 105 housing units at an average density of 141.9 per square mile (54.8/km^{2}). The racial makeup of the village was 89.8% White, 1.3% African American, 1.7% Native American, 0.7% Asian, 5.3% from other races, and 1.3% from two or more races. Hispanic or Latino of any race were 15.8% of the population.

There were 96 households, of which 50.0% had children under the age of 18 living with them, 52.1% were married couples living together, 14.6% had a female householder with no husband present, 13.5% had a male householder with no wife present, and 19.8% were non-families. 15.6% of all households were made up of individuals, and 6.3% had someone living alone who was 65 years of age or older. The average household size was 3.16 and the average family size was 3.52.

The median age in the village was 33.8 years. 33.3% of residents were under the age of 18; 8.3% were between the ages of 18 and 24; 25.1% were from 25 to 44; 24.4% were from 45 to 64; and 8.9% were 65 years of age or older. The gender makeup of the village was 50.2% male and 49.8% female.

=== 2000 census ===
As of the census of 2000, there were 296 people, 90 households, and 73 families living in the village. The population density was 397.9 inhabitants per square mile (153.6/km^{2}). There were 100 housing units at an average density of 134.4 per square mile (51.9/km^{2}). The racial makeup of the village was 82.43% White, 1.35% Asian, 14.53% from other races, and 1.69% from two or more races. Hispanic or Latino of any race were 16.22% of the population.

There were 90 households, out of which 52.2% had children under the age of 18 living with them, 62.2% were married couples living together, 13.3% had a female householder with no husband present, and 17.8% were non-families. 12.2% of all households were made up of individuals, and 4.4% had someone living alone who was 65 years of age or older. The average household size was 3.29 and the average family size was 3.62.

In the village, the population was spread out, with 41.2% under the age of 18, 4.7% from 18 to 24, 32.1% from 25 to 44, 12.8% from 45 to 64, and 9.1% who were 65 years of age or older. The median age was 27 years. For every 100 females there were 89.7 males. For every 100 females age 18 and over, there were 97.7 males.

The median income for a household in the village was $41,250, and the median income for a family was $39,000. Males had a median income of $28,750 versus $21,875 for females. The per capita income for the village was $13,642. About 11.4% of families and 10.7% of the population were below the poverty line, including 13.7% of those under the age of eighteen and 23.8% of those 65 or over.

== Education ==
It is in the McComb Local School District.
