= Williamstown, Ohio =

Unincorporated community in Ohio, U.S.

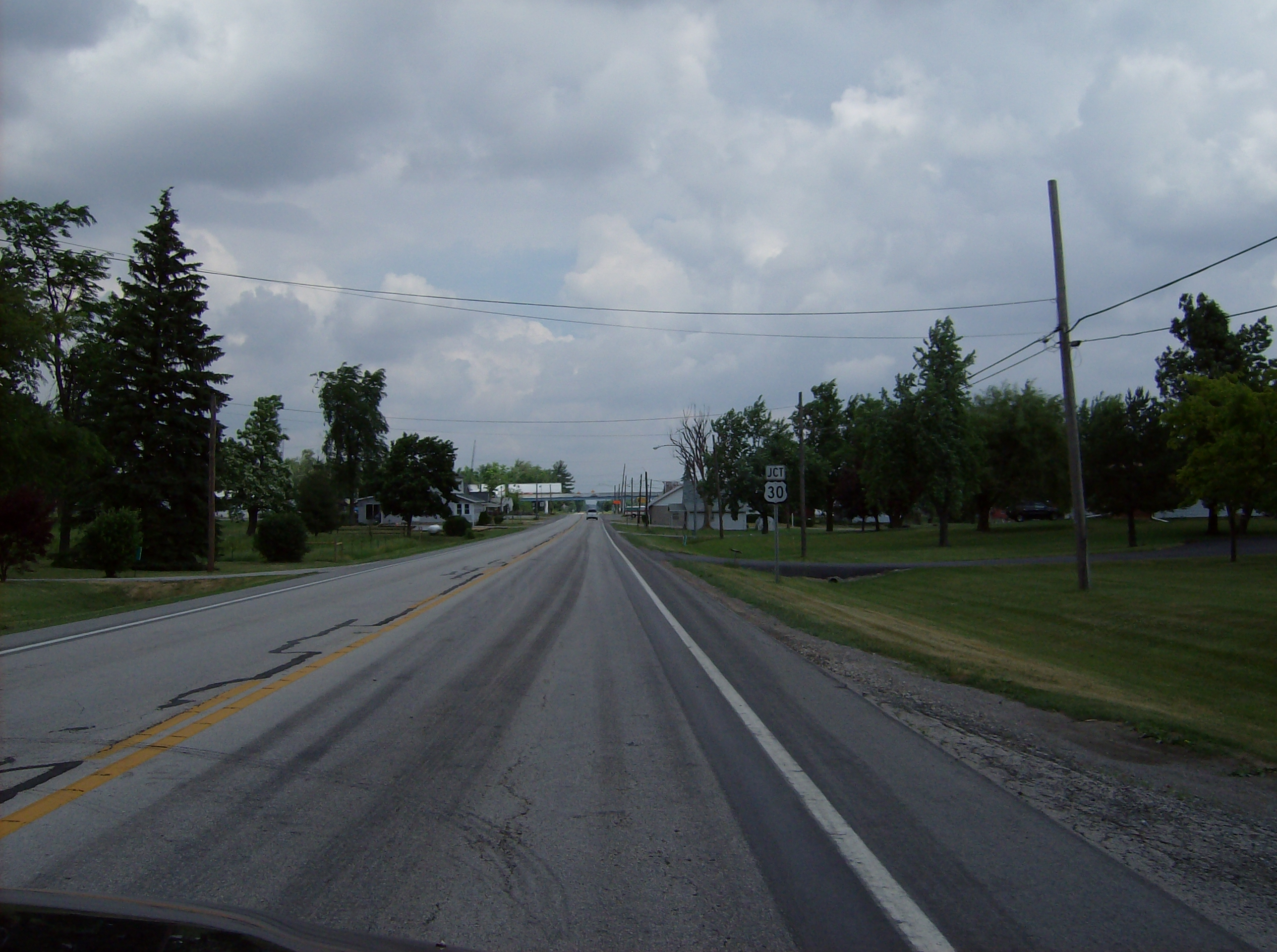
- Coming into Williamstown from the south
- Nickname: Billtown
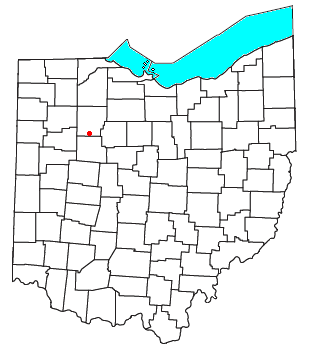
- Location of Williamstown, Ohio
- Coordinates: 40°50′02″N 83°39′03″W
- Country: US
- U.S. state: Ohio
- County: Hancock County
- Township: Madison Township
- Established: 1834
- Founder: John W. Williams

Williamstown is an unincorporated community in southern Madison Township, Hancock County, Ohio, United States. Although it is unincorporated, it has its own zip code of 45897. It lies at the intersection of U.S. Routes 30 and 68.

== History ==
Williamstown was laid out in 1834 by John W. Williams, and named for him. A post office called Eagle was established in 1834, and the name was changed to Williamstown in 1868. The post office service was suspended in 2007 and it was discontinued in 2009.
