= Jackson Township, Wood County, Ohio =

Township in Ohio, US

- Township
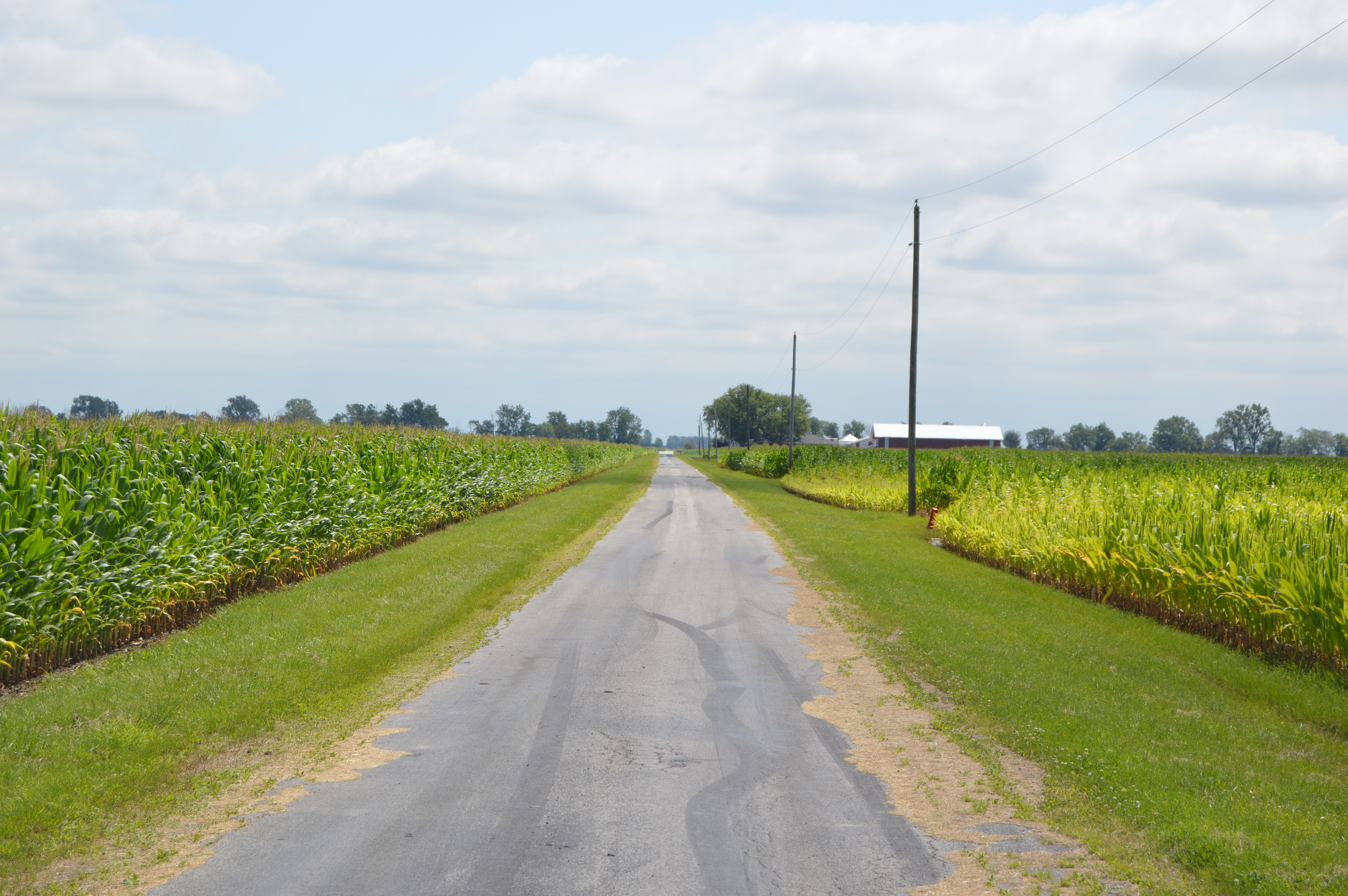
- Cornfields along Dunn Road by the Henry County line

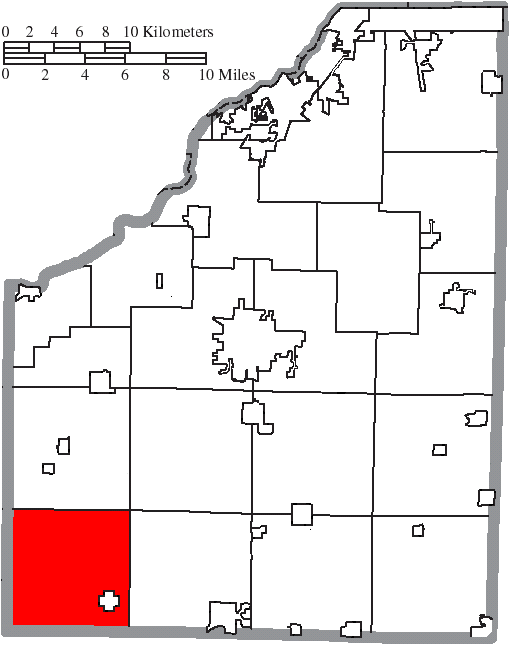
- Location of Jackson Township in Wood County
- Coordinates: 41°11′59″N 83°49′4″W
- Country: United States
- State: Ohio
- County: Wood

Area
  - Total: 36.5 sq mi (94.5 km^{2})
  - Land: 36.5 sq mi (94.5 km^{2})
  - Water: 0 sq mi (0.0 km^{2})
- Elevation: 702 ft (214 m)

Population (2020)
  - Total: 702
  - Density: 19.2/sq mi (7.43/km^{2})
- Time zone: UTC-5 (Eastern (EST))
  - Summer (DST): UTC-4 (EDT)
- FIPS code: 39-38164
- GNIS feature ID: 1087185

Jackson Township is one of the nineteen townships of Wood County, Ohio, United States. The 2020 census found 702 people in the township.

== Geography ==
Located in the southwestern corner of the county and possessing Wood County's share of a "four corners" boundary, it borders the following townships:

- Milton Township - north
- Liberty Township - northeast corner
- Henry Township - east
- Portage Township, Hancock County - southeast corner
- Pleasant Township, Hancock County - south
- Van Buren Township, Putnam County - southwest corner
- Bartlow Township, Henry County - west
- Richfield Township, Henry County - northwest corner

The village of Hoytville is located in southeastern Jackson Township.

== Name and history ==
Jackson Township was established in 1840. The township was named for Andrew Jackson, seventh President of the United States (1829–1837). It is one of thirty-seven Jackson Townships statewide.

== Government ==
The township is governed by a three-member board of trustees, who are elected in November of odd-numbered years to a four-year term beginning on the following January 1. Two are elected in the year after the presidential election and one is elected in the year before it. There is also an elected township fiscal officer, who serves a four-year term beginning on April 1 of the year after the election, which is held in November of the year before the presidential election. Vacancies in the fiscal officership or on the board of trustees are filled by the remaining trustees.
