= Jackson Township, Hancock County, Ohio =

Township in Ohio, US

- Township
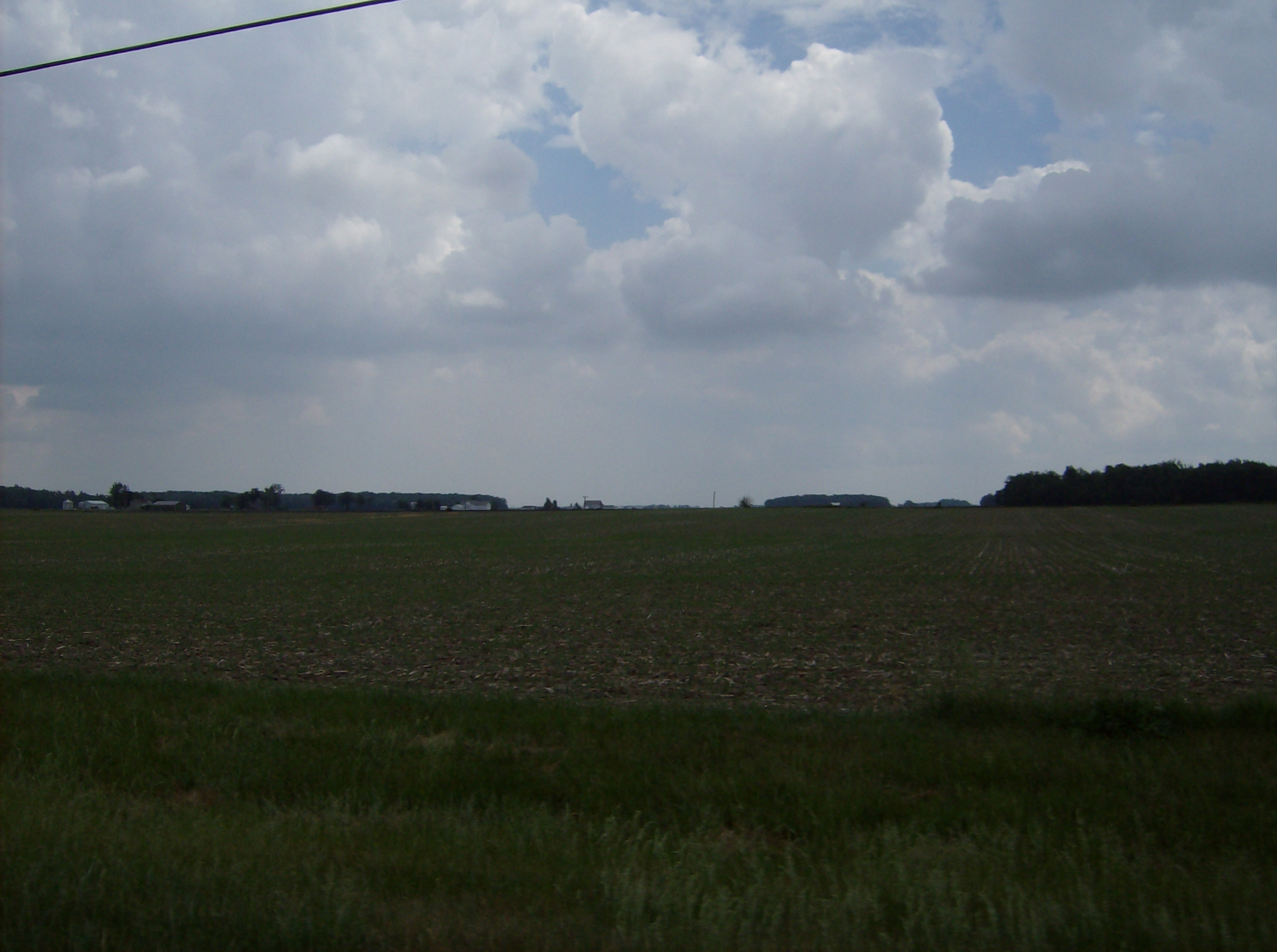
- Fields along U.S. Route 68

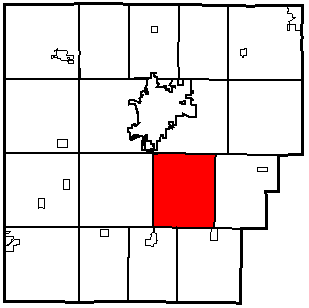
- Location of Jackson Township in Hancock County
- Coordinates: 40°57′36″N 83°35′58″W
- Country: United States
- State: Ohio
- County: Hancock

Area
  - Total: 29.7 sq mi (76.9 km^{2})
  - Land: 29.6 sq mi (76.7 km^{2})
  - Water: 0.077 sq mi (0.2 km^{2})
- Elevation: 820 ft (250 m)

Population (2020)
  - Total: 1,031
  - Density: 34.8/sq mi (13.4/km^{2})
- Time zone: UTC−5 (Eastern (EST))
  - Summer (DST): UTC−4 (EDT)
- FIPS code: 39-37800
- GNIS feature ID: 1086246

Jackson Township is one of the seventeen townships of Hancock County, Ohio, United States. As of the 2020 census the population was 1,031.

== Name and history ==
It is one of thirty-seven Jackson Townships statewide.

Jackson Township was organized in 1829 and named for Andrew Jackson, who had been elected President of the United States the previous year.

== Geography ==
Located in the central part of the county, it borders the following townships:

- Marion Township—north
- Amanda Township—east
- Delaware Township—southeast
- Madison Township—southwest
- Eagle Township—west
- Liberty Township—northwest corner

No municipalities are located in Jackson Township.

== Government ==
The township is governed by a three-member board of trustees, who are elected in November of odd-numbered years to a four-year term beginning on the following January 1. Two are elected in the year after the presidential election and one is elected in the year before it. There is also an elected township fiscal officer, who serves a four-year term beginning on April 1 of the year after the election, which is held in November of the year before the presidential election. Vacancies in the fiscal officership or on the board of trustees are filled by the remaining trustees.
