= Pleasant Township, Hancock County, Ohio =

Township in Ohio, US

- Township
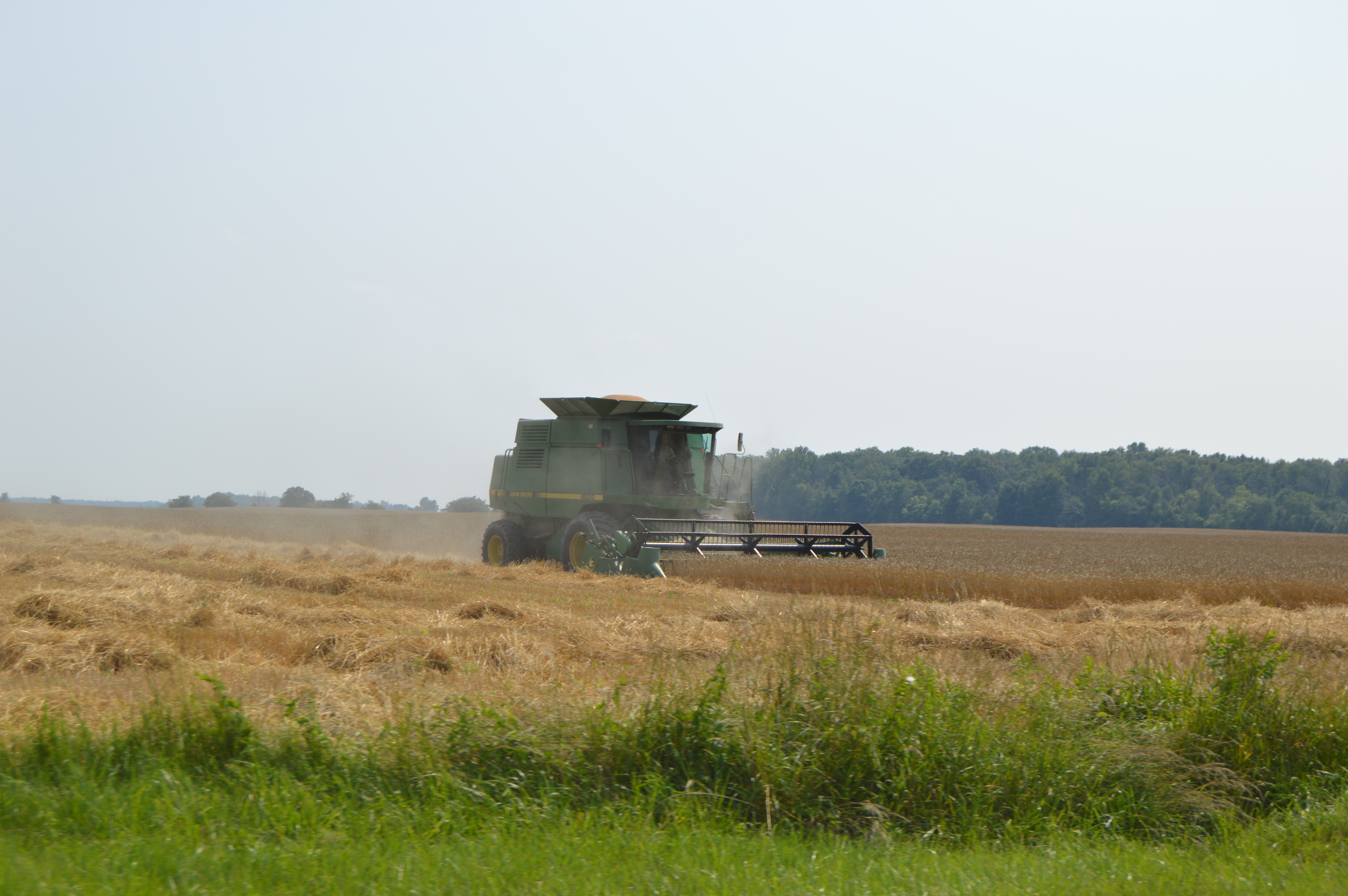
- Harvesting wheat outside of McComb

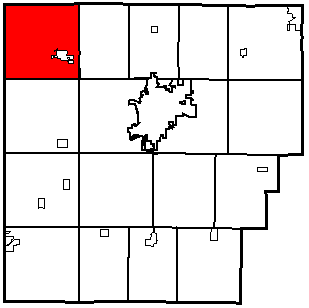
- Location of Pleasant Township in Hancock County
- Coordinates: 41°6′44″N 83°49′13″W
- Country: United States
- State: Ohio
- County: Hancock

Area
  - Total: 36.5 sq mi (94.6 km^{2})
  - Land: 36.5 sq mi (94.5 km^{2})
  - Water: 0.039 sq mi (0.1 km^{2})
- Elevation: 751 ft (229 m)

Population (2020)
  - Total: 2,377
  - Density: 65.1/sq mi (25.2/km^{2})
- Time zone: UTC-5 (Eastern (EST))
  - Summer (DST): UTC-4 (EDT)
- FIPS code: 39-63268
- GNIS feature ID: 1086251

Pleasant Township is one of the seventeen townships of Hancock County, Ohio, United States. As of the 2020 census, the population was 2,377.

== Geography ==
Located in the northwestern corner of the county, it borders the following townships:

- Jackson Township, Wood County - north
- Henry Township, Wood County - northeast corner
- Portage Township - east
- Liberty Township - southeast corner
- Blanchard Township - south
- Blanchard Township, Putnam County - southwest corner
- Van Buren Township, Putnam County - west
- Bartlow Township, Henry County - northwest corner

The village of McComb is located in eastern Pleasant Township.

== Name and history ==
It is one of fifteen Pleasant Townships statewide.

Pleasant Township was organized in 1835.

== Government ==
The township is governed by a three-member board of trustees, who are elected in November of odd-numbered years to a four-year term beginning on the following January 1. Two are elected in the year after the presidential election and one is elected in the year before it. There is also an elected township fiscal officer, who serves a four-year term beginning on April 1 of the year after the election, which is held in November of the year before the presidential election. Vacancies in the fiscal officership or on the board of trustees are filled by the remaining trustees.
