= Delaware Township, Hancock County, Ohio =

Township in Ohio, US

- Township
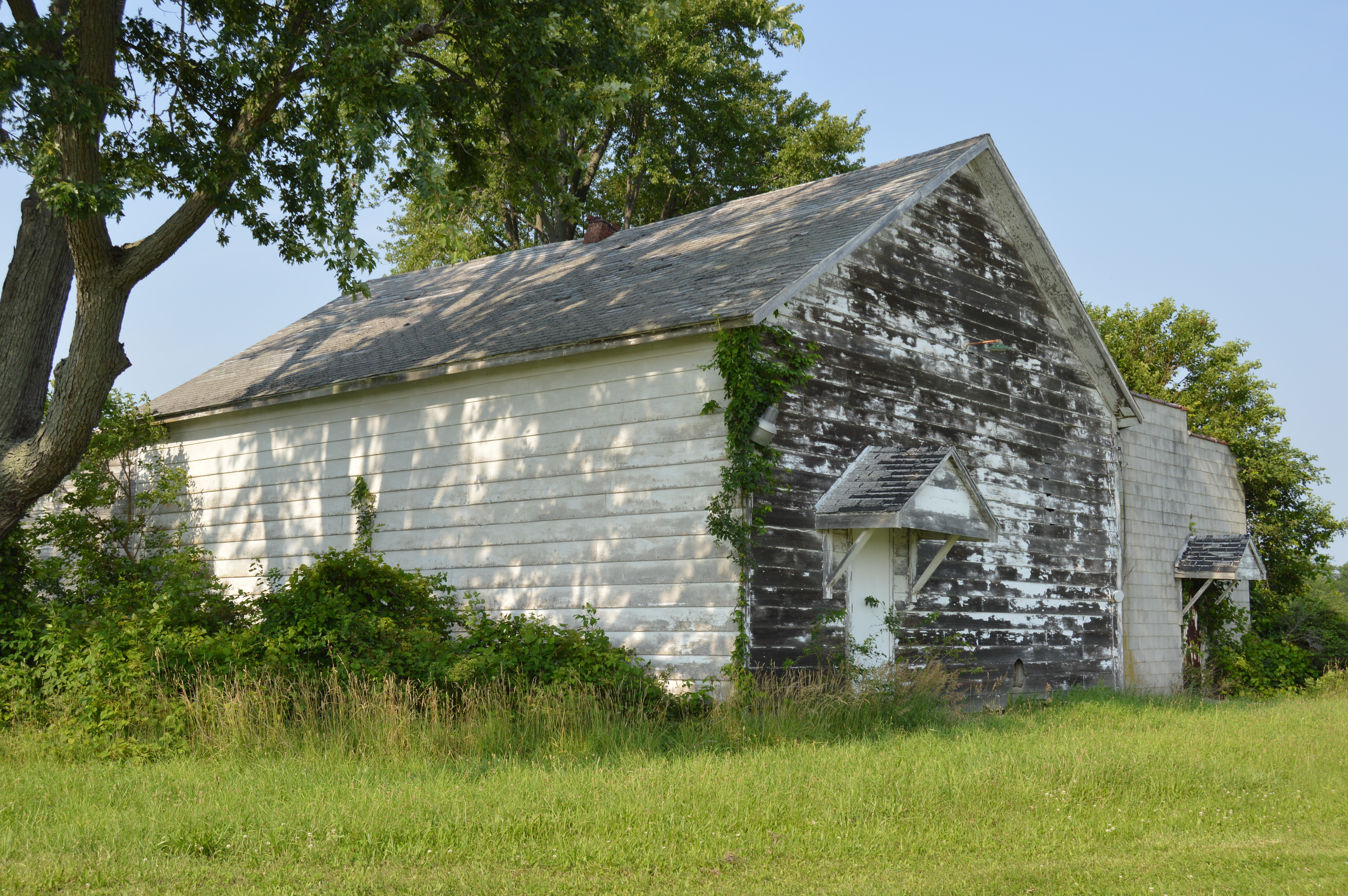
- Old grange hall southeast of Mount Blanchard

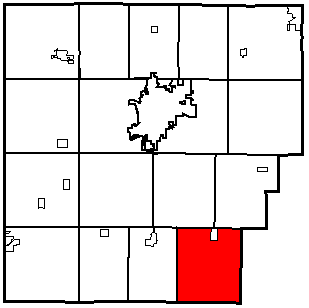
- Location of Delaware Township in Hancock County
- Coordinates: 40°52′33″N 83°33′51″W
- Country: United States
- State: Ohio
- County: Hancock

Area
  - Total: 31.2 sq mi (80.7 km^{2})
  - Land: 31.1 sq mi (80.6 km^{2})
  - Water: 0.039 sq mi (0.1 km^{2})
- Elevation: 837 ft (255 m)

Population (2020)
  - Total: 1,208
  - Density: 38.8/sq mi (15.0/km^{2})
- Time zone: UTC-5 (Eastern (EST))
  - Summer (DST): UTC-4 (EDT)
- FIPS code: 39-21462
- GNIS feature ID: 1086243

Delaware Township is one of the seventeen townships of Hancock County, Ohio, United States. As of the 2020 census the population was 1,208.

== Geography ==
Located in the southeastern corner of the county, it borders the following townships:

- Amanda Township - northeast
- Richland Township, Wyandot County - east
- Jackson Township, Hardin County - south
- Blanchard Township, Hardin County - southwest
- Madison Township - west
- Jackson Township - northwest

The village of Mount Blanchard is located in northern Delaware Township.

== Name and history ==
Statewide, other Delaware Townships are located in Defiance and Delaware counties.

== Government ==
The township is governed by a three-member board of trustees, who are elected in November of odd-numbered years to a four-year term beginning on the following January 1. Two are elected in the year after the presidential election and one is elected in the year before it. There is also an elected township fiscal officer, who serves a four-year term beginning on April 1 of the year after the election, which is held in November of the year before the presidential election. Vacancies in the fiscal officership or on the board of trustees are filled by the remaining trustees.
