= Madison Township, Hancock County, Ohio =

Township in Ohio, US

- Township
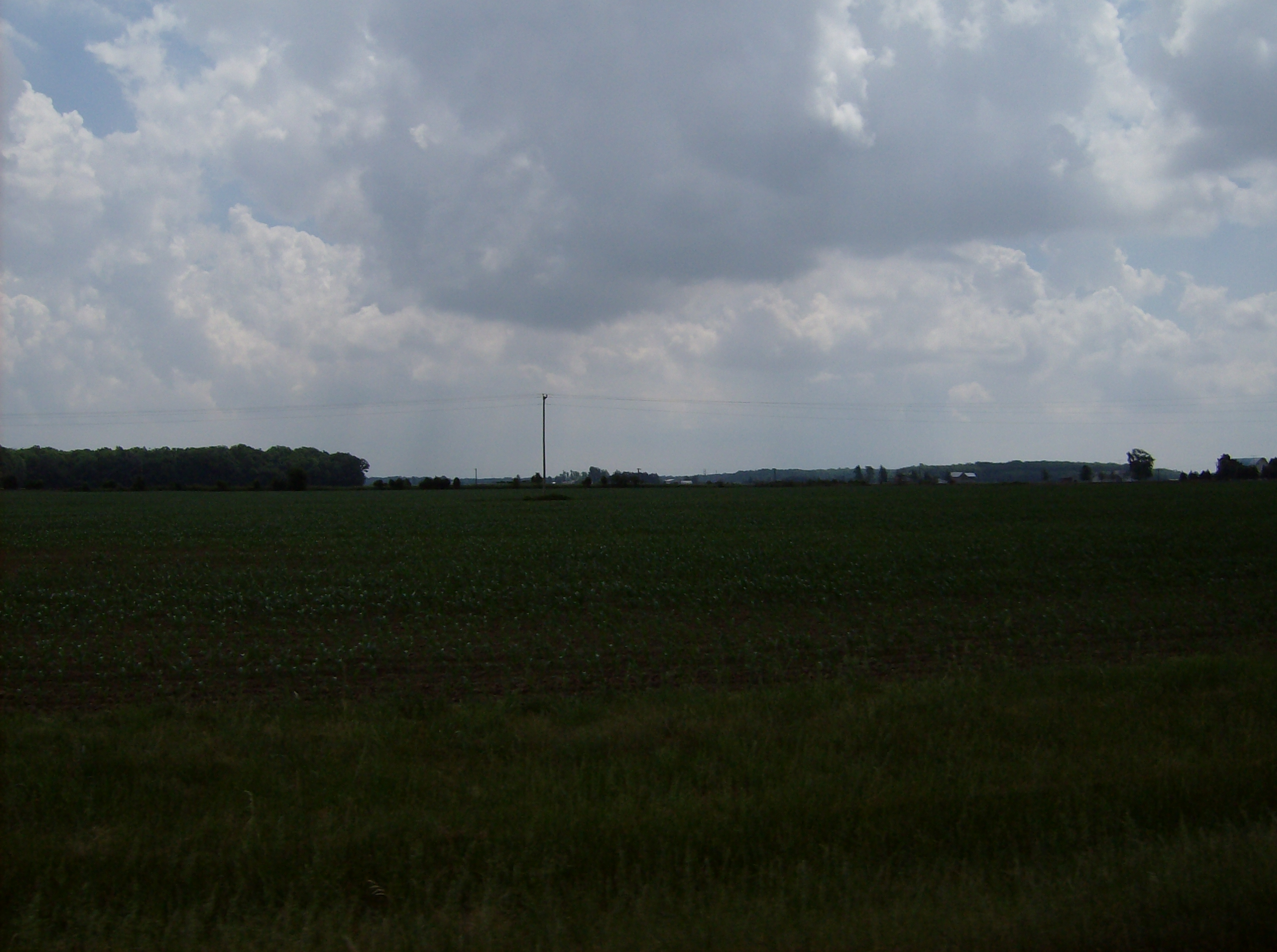
- Madison Township contains wide farmlands interspersed with small woods.

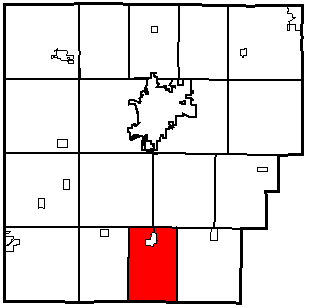
- Location of Madison Township in Hancock County
- Coordinates: 40°52′47″N 83°38′57″W
- Country: United States
- State: Ohio
- County: Hancock

Area
  - Total: 22.94 sq mi (59.42 km^{2})
  - Land: 22.92 sq mi (59.36 km^{2})
  - Water: 0.027 sq mi (0.07 km^{2})
- Elevation: 876 ft (267 m)

Population (2020)
  - Total: 869
  - Density: 37.9/sq mi (14.6/km^{2})
- Time zone: UTC-5 (Eastern (EST))
  - Summer (DST): UTC-4 (EDT)
- FIPS code: 39-46438
- GNIS feature ID: 1086248

Madison Township is one of the seventeen townships of Hancock County, Ohio, United States. As of the 2020 census, the population was 869.

== Geography ==
Located in the southern part of the county, it borders the following townships:

- Jackson Township - northeast
- Delaware Township - east
- Blanchard Township, Hardin County - southeast
- Washington Township, Hardin County - southwest
- Van Buren Township - west
- Eagle Township - northwest

The village of Arlington is located in northern Madison Township, and the unincorporated community of Williamstown lies in the southern part of the township.

== Name and history ==
It is one of twenty Madison Townships statewide.

Madison Township was organized in 1840. It was named for James Madison, fourth President of the United States.

== Government ==
The township is governed by a three-member board of trustees, who are elected in November of odd-numbered years to a four-year term beginning on the following January 1. Two are elected in the year after the presidential election and one is elected in the year before it. There is also an elected township fiscal officer, who serves a four-year term beginning on April 1 of the year after the election, which is held in November of the year before the presidential election. Vacancies in the fiscal officership or on the board of trustees are filled by the remaining trustees.
