= Henry Township, Wood County, Ohio =

Township in Ohio, US

- Township
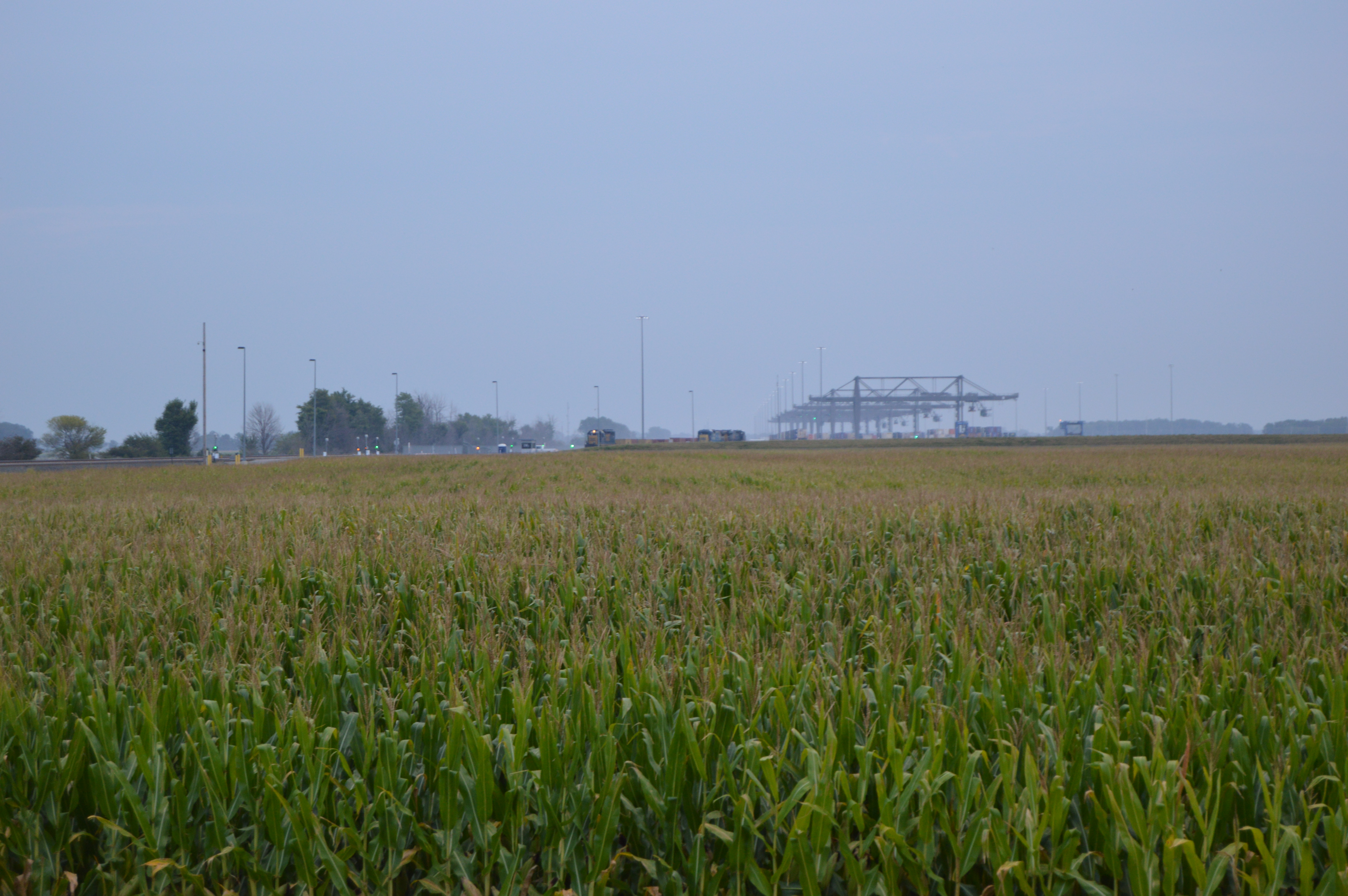
- Fields east of Hoytville

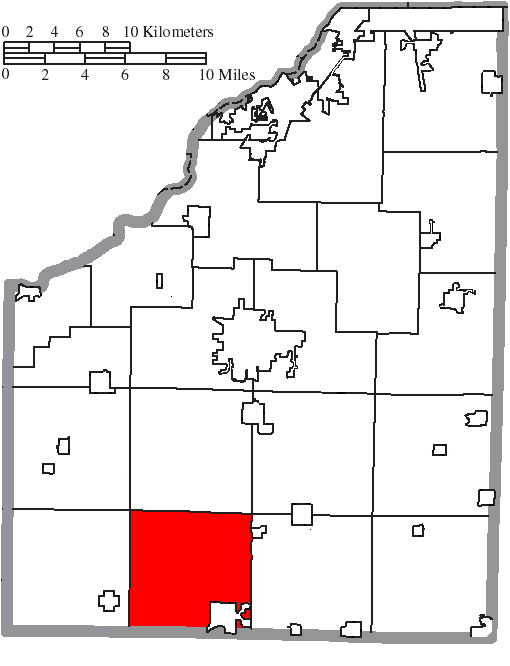
- Location of Henry Township in Wood County
- Coordinates: 41°11′37″N 83°41′0″W
- Country: United States
- State: Ohio
- County: Wood

Area
  - Total: 36.1 sq mi (93.4 km^{2})
  - Land: 36.0 sq mi (93.2 km^{2})
  - Water: 0.077 sq mi (0.2 km^{2})
- Elevation: 732 ft (223 m)

Population (2020)
  - Total: 4,079
  - Density: 113/sq mi (43.8/km^{2})
- Time zone: UTC-5 (Eastern (EST))
  - Summer (DST): UTC-4 (EDT)
- FIPS code: 39-34986
- GNIS feature ID: 1087184

Henry Township is one of the nineteen townships of Wood County, Ohio, United States. The 2020 census found 4,079 people in the township.

== Geography ==
Located in the southern part of the county, it borders the following townships:

- Liberty Township - north
- Portage Township - northeast corner
- Bloom Township - east
- Allen Township, Hancock County - southeast
- Portage Township, Hancock County - south
- Pleasant Township, Hancock County - southwest corner
- Jackson Township - west
- Milton Township - northwest

The village of North Baltimore is located in southeastern Henry Township.

== Name and history ==
Henry Township was established in 1836, and named after Henry Shaw, a county official. It is the only Henry Township statewide.

== Government ==
The township is governed by a three-member board of trustees, who are elected in November of odd-numbered years to a four-year term beginning on the following January 1. Two are elected in the year after the presidential election and one is elected in the year before it. There is also an elected township fiscal officer, who serves a four-year term beginning on April 1 of the year after the election, which is held in November of the year before the presidential election. Vacancies in the fiscal officership or on the board of trustees are filled by the remaining trustees.
