= West Independence, Ohio =

Unincorporated community in Ohio, U.S.

Coordinates: 41°04′36″N 83°26′28″W

West Independence is an unincorporated community in Hancock County, in the U.S. state of Ohio.

== History ==
West Independence was laid out in 1849 on the Findlay—Tiffin road. A post office called West Independence was established in 1854, and remained in operation until 1908.
