= Amanda Township, Hancock County, Ohio =

Township in Ohio, US

- Township
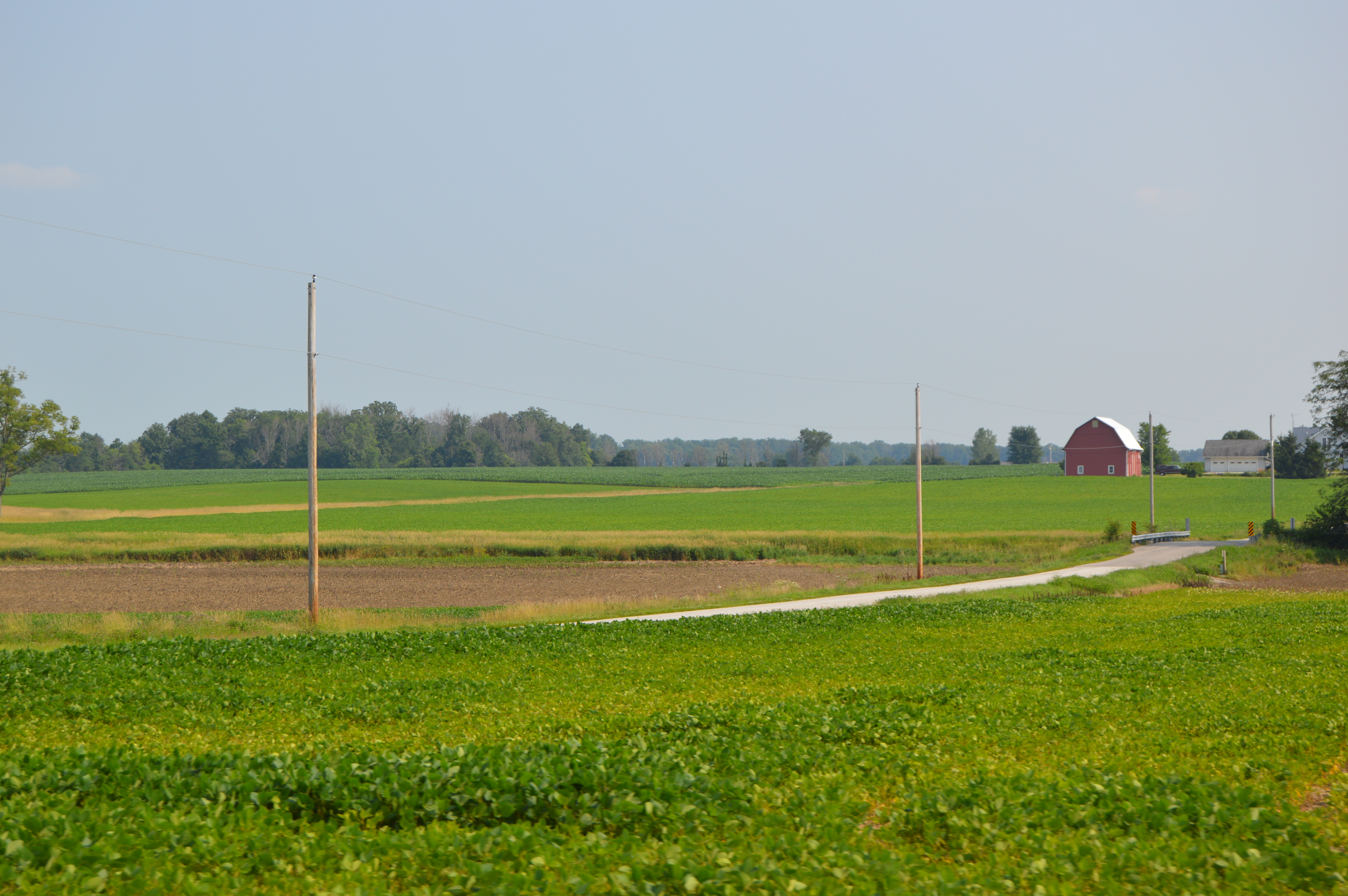
- Soybean fields south of Vanlue on County Road 26

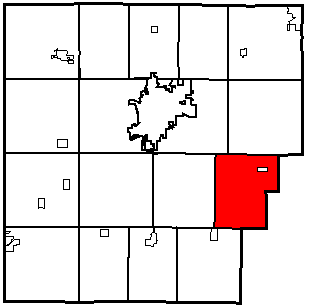
- Location of Amanda Township in Hancock County
- Coordinates: 40°57′17″N 83°30′23″W
- Country: United States
- State: Ohio
- County: Hancock

Area
  - Total: 27.8 sq mi (71.9 km^{2})
  - Land: 27.7 sq mi (71.8 km^{2})
  - Water: 0.039 sq mi (0.1 km^{2})
- Elevation: 814 ft (248 m)

Population (2020)
  - Total: 1,036
  - Density: 37.4/sq mi (14.4/km^{2})
- Time zone: UTC-5 (Eastern (EST))
  - Summer (DST): UTC-4 (EDT)
- FIPS code: 39-01644
- GNIS feature ID: 1086239

Amanda Township is one of the seventeen townships of Hancock County, Ohio, United States. As of the 2020 census, the township population was 1,036.

== Geography ==
Located in the eastern part of the county, it borders the following townships:

- Biglick Township – north
- Ridge Township, Wyandot County – east
- Richland Township, Wyandot County – southeast
- Delaware Township – southwest
- Jackson Township – west
- Marion Township – northwest

The village of Vanlue is located in northeastern Amanda Township.

== Name and history ==
Statewide, other Amanda Townships are located in Allen and Fairfield counties.

Amanda Township was first settled on February 25, 1822, by Thomas Thompson. Thompson built a cabin in 1823 and planted the township's first crop that year. He brought his family to the township from Pickaway County in 1824. In 1829, Thompson became Hancock County's first Justice of the Peace. Thompson lived in Amanda Township until his death in Vanlue on October 26, 1873.

== Government ==
The township is governed by a three-member board of trustees, who are elected in November of odd-numbered years to a four-year term beginning on the following January 1. Two are elected in the year after the presidential election and one is elected in the year before it. There is also an elected township fiscal officer, who serves a four-year term beginning on April 1 of the year after the election, which is held in November of the year before the presidential election. Vacancies in the fiscal officership or on the board of trustees are filled by the remaining trustees.
