= HMS Cordelia =

Four ships of the Royal Navy have borne the name HMS Cordelia, named after the legendary Queen of the Britons:

- HMS Cordelia (1808) was a 10-gun Cherokee-class brig-sloop launched in 1808. She was sold in 1833.
- HMS Cordelia (1856) was an 11-gun Racer-class wooden screw sloop launched in 1856. She was sold in 1870.
- HMS Cordelia (1881) was a Comus-class screw corvette launched in 1881. She was sold in 1904.
- HMS Cordelia (1914) was a C-class light cruiser launched in 1914. She was sold in 1921.
