= Cordelia, Ohio =

Unincorporated community in Ohio, U.S.

Coordinates: 40°53′58″N 83°47′09″W

Cordelia is an unincorporated community in Hancock County, in the U.S. state of Ohio.

== History ==
A post office was established at Cordelia in 1883, and remained in operation until 1895. William M. McKinley was the first postmaster.
