= Allen Township, Hancock County, Ohio =

Township in Ohio, US

- Township
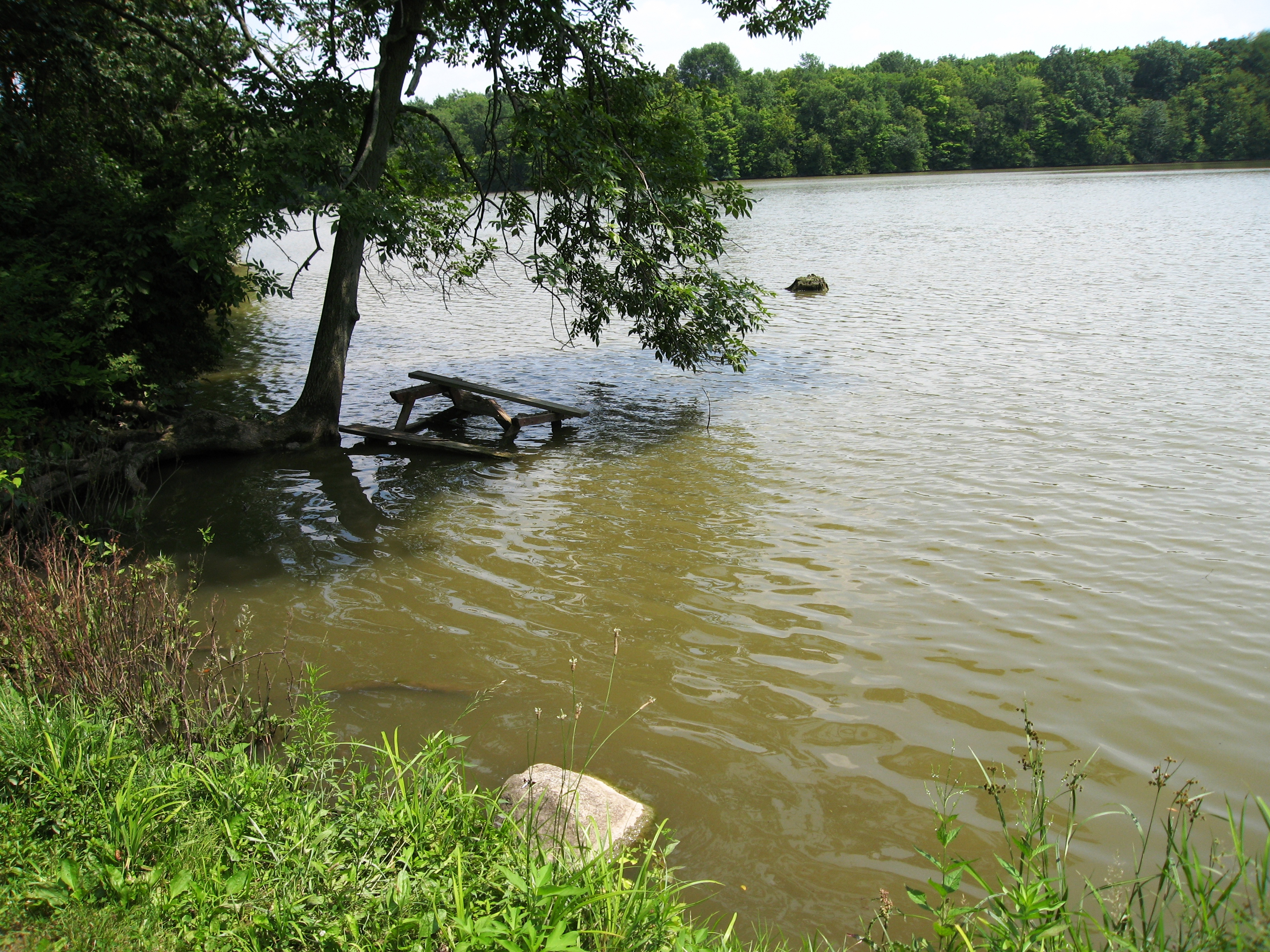
- Lake at Van Buren State Park

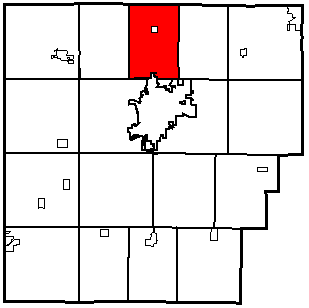
- Location of Allen Township in Hancock County.
- Coordinates: 41°7′13″N 83°38′51″W
- Country: United States
- State: Ohio
- County: Hancock

Area
  - Total: 23.3 sq mi (60.4 km^{2})
  - Land: 23.2 sq mi (60.1 km^{2})
  - Water: 0.12 sq mi (0.3 km^{2})
- Elevation: 794 ft (242 m)

Population (2020)
  - Total: 2,754
  - Density: 119/sq mi (45.8/km^{2})
- Time zone: UTC-5 (Eastern (EST))
  - Summer (DST): UTC-4 (EDT)
- FIPS code: 39-01308
- GNIS feature ID: 1086238
- Website: www.allentownship.com

Allen Township is one of the seventeen townships of Hancock County, Ohio, United States. As of the 2020 census the population was 2,754.

== Geography ==
Located in the northern part of the county, it borders the following townships:

- Bloom Township, Wood County - northeast
- Cass Township - east
- Marion Township - southeast
- Liberty Township - southwest
- Portage Township - west
- Henry Township, Wood County - northwest

Several populated places are located in Allen Township:

- Part of Findlay, a city and the county seat of Hancock County, in the south
- Van Buren, a village in the north
- Mortimer, an unincorporated community in the center

== Name and history ==
Statewide, other Allen Townships are located in Darke, Ottawa, and Union counties.

== Government ==
The township is governed by a three-member board of trustees, who are elected in November of odd-numbered years to a four-year term beginning on the following January 1. Two are elected in the year after the presidential election and one is elected in the year before it. There is also an elected township fiscal officer, who serves a four-year term beginning on April 1 of the year after the election, which is held in November of the year before the presidential election. Vacancies in the fiscal officership or on the board of trustees are filled by the remaining trustees.
