= Portage Township, Hancock County, Ohio =

Township in Ohio, US

- Township
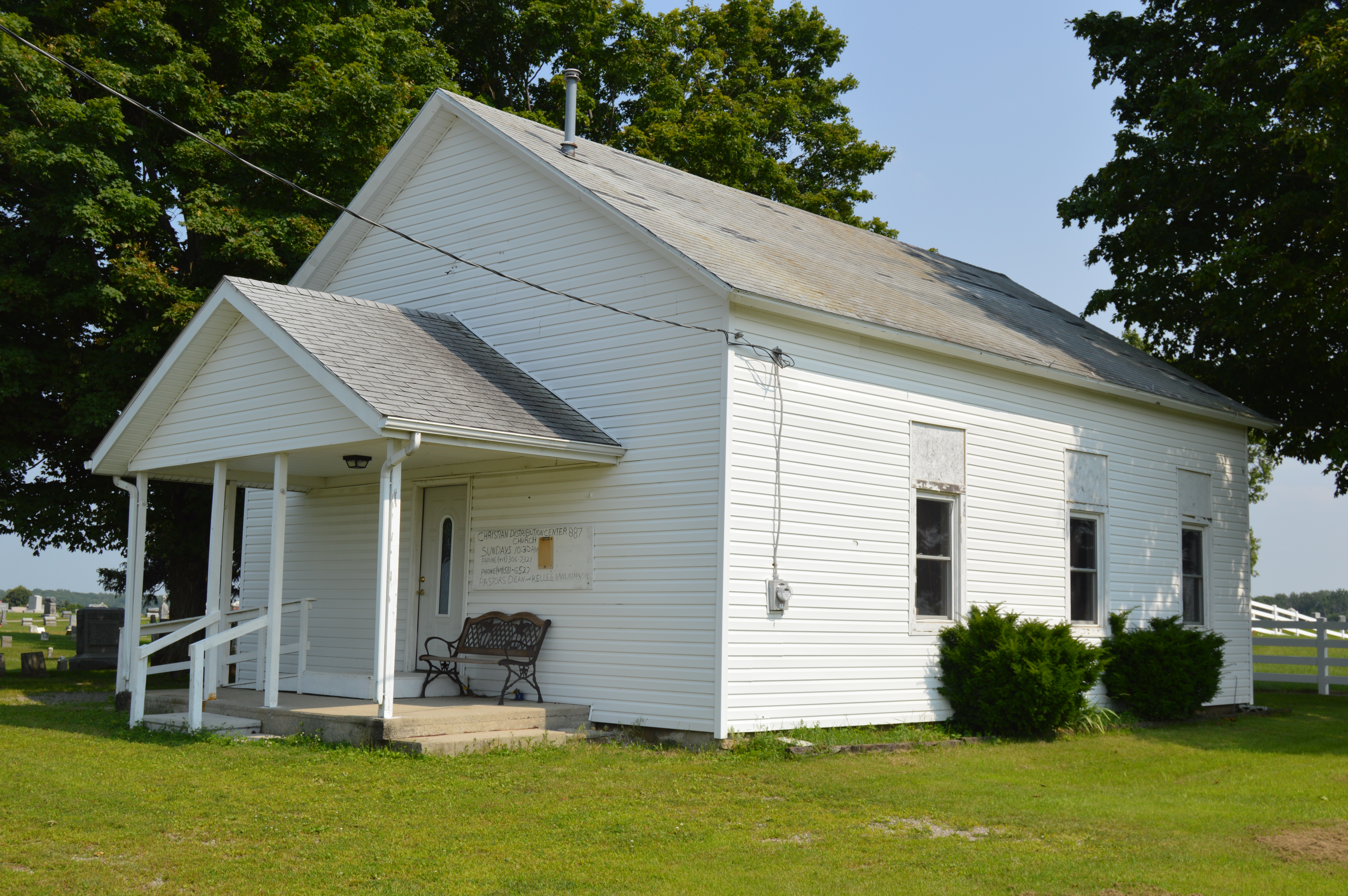
- Christian Distribution Center Church, Township Road 109

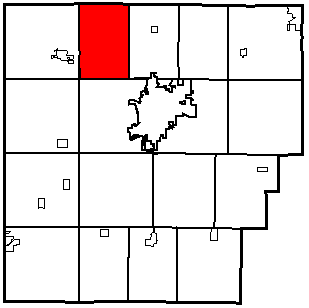
- Location of Portage Township in Hancock County
- Coordinates: 41°7′18″N 83°43′21″W
- Country: United States
- State: Ohio
- County: Hancock

Area
  - Total: 24.13 sq mi (62.50 km^{2})
  - Land: 24.12 sq mi (62.46 km^{2})
  - Water: 0.015 sq mi (0.04 km^{2})
- Elevation: 758 ft (231 m)

Population (2020)
  - Total: 734
  - Density: 30.4/sq mi (11.8/km^{2})
- Time zone: UTC-5 (Eastern (EST))
  - Summer (DST): UTC-4 (EDT)
- FIPS code: 39-64066
- GNIS feature ID: 1086252

Portage Township is one of the seventeen townships of Hancock County, Ohio, United States. As of the 2020 census, the population was 734.

== Geography ==
Located in the northern part of the county, it borders the following townships:

- Henry Township, Wood County - north
- Allen Township - east
- Liberty Township - south
- Blanchard Township - southwest corner
- Pleasant Township - west
- Jackson Township, Wood County - northwest corner

No municipalities are located in Portage Township.

== Name and history ==
Statewide, other Portage Townships are located in Ottawa and Wood counties.

Portage Township was organized in 1833. The township was named for a river that runs through it.

== Government ==
The township is governed by a three-member board of trustees, who are elected in November of odd-numbered years to a four-year term beginning on the following January 1. Two are elected in the year after the presidential election and one is elected in the year before it. There is also an elected township fiscal officer, who serves a four-year term beginning on April 1 of the year after the election, which is held in November of the year before the presidential election. Vacancies in the fiscal officership or on the board of trustees are filled by the remaining trustees.
