= Shawtown, Hancock County, Ohio =

Unincorporated community in Ohio, U.S.

Coordinates: 41°06′29″N 83°52′19″W

Shawtown is an unincorporated community in Hancock County, in the U.S. state of Ohio.

== History ==
Shawtown was laid out in 1882 when the New York, Chicago and St. Louis Railroad was extended to that point. A post office was established at Shawtown in 1881, and remained in operation until 1923.
