= Cordelia A. Culbertson House =

Historic house in California, United States

- U.S. National Register of Historic Places
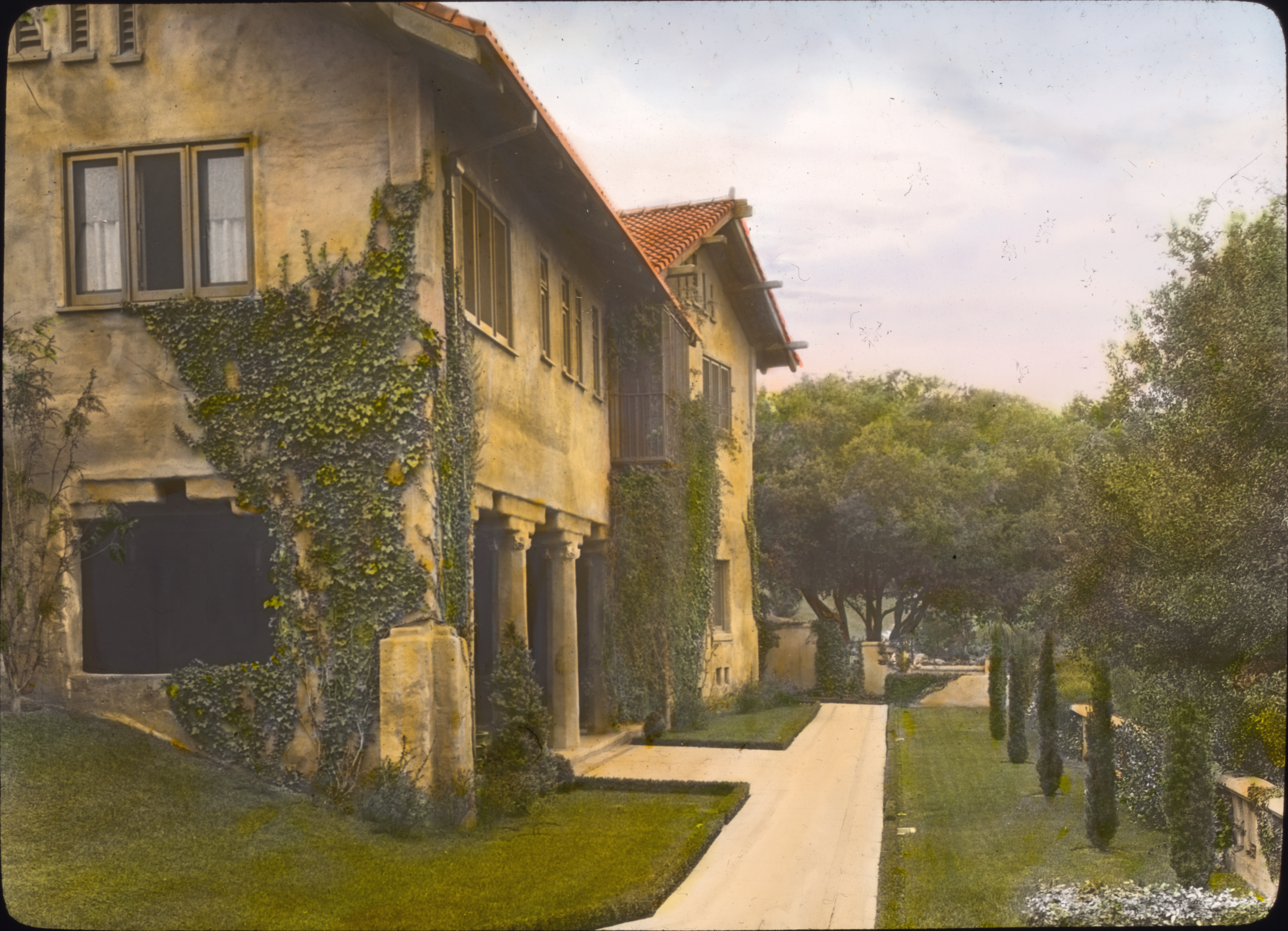
- The house in 1917

- Location within the Los Angeles metropolitan area Location within California Location within the United States
- Location: 1188 Hillcrest Ave., Pasadena, California
- Coordinates: 34°7′40″N 118°7′56″W
- Area: 0.7 acres (0.28 ha)
- Built: 1911
- Architect: Greene & Greene
- Architectural style: Craftsman, Oriental
- NRHP reference No.: 85002198
- Added to NRHP: September 12, 1985

The Cordelia A. Culbertson House is a historic house located at 1188 Hillcrest Ave. in Pasadena, California.

== History ==
The house was built for Cordelia, Kate, and Margaret Culbertson, three unmarried sisters; Cordelia, the eldest sister, officially commissioned the house. In 1917 the house was purchased by the wealthy widow Mrs. Dudley P. Allen of Cleveland, Ohio. She purchased it as a summer home that she enjoyed with her second husband Francis F. Prentiss, who later died there in 1937.

The house was added to the National Register of Historic Places on September 12, 1985.

== Architecture ==
Built in 1911, the house was designed by prominent Pasadena architects Charles and Henry Greene.

The Greenes designed the house in the Craftsman style; the design also features Chinese elements throughout, particularly on the south side of the home. Both styles frequently appeared in Greene and Greene's designs, and the house's U-shaped floor plan can also be seen in the brothers' other houses. However, the home features gunite exterior walls and a tile roof, a unique combination among the Greenes' works. An Italian garden is situated at the center of the home.

=== Ceramics ===
The building and property feature exterior ceramics from five significant historical manufacturers. Small tiling from the Grueby Faience Company depicts floral designs and solid colors are installed in the gunite walls, column capitals with crouching musicians were made by the Batchelder Tile Company, and the building's red and green roof tiles were made by the Ludowici-Celadon Company. The property's grounds were ornamented with large planters and animals by Gladding, McBean and the courtyard fountain was designed with tiles by Pewabic Pottery.
