= Cannonsburg, Ohio =

Unincorporated community in Ohio, U.S.

Coordinates: 40°54′53″N 83°47′06″W

Cannonsburg is an unincorporated community in Hancock County, in the U.S. state of Ohio.

== History ==
Cannonsburg was laid out in 1839. A post office called Cannonsburgh was established in 1840, the name was changed to Cannonsburg in 1894, and the post office closed in 1902.

== See also ==
Dellroy, Ohio, a village once known as Cannonsburg.
