= Deweyville, Ohio =

Unincorporated community

Coordinates: 41°07′54″N 83°49′12″W

Deweyville is an unincorporated community in Hancock County, in the U.S. state of Ohio.

== History ==
Deweyville was laid out in 1880. A post office called Deweyville was established in 1880, and remained in operation until 1927.
