= Findlay Airport =

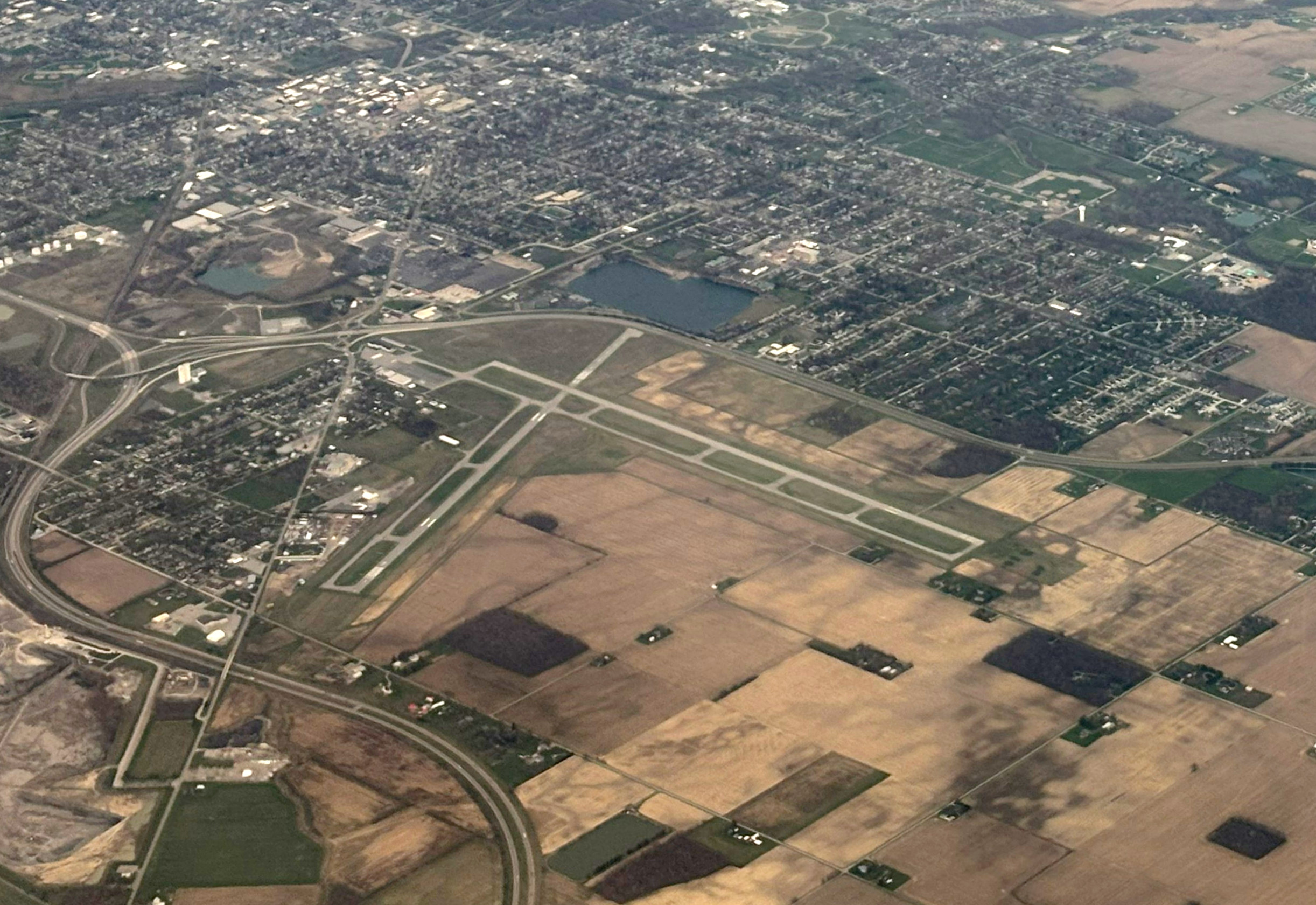
- IATA: FDY; ICAO: KFDY; FAA LID: FDY

Summary
- Airport type: Public
- Owner: City of Findlay
- Serves: Findlay, Ohio
- Location: Hancock County, Ohio
- Time zone: UTC−05:00 (-5)
  - Summer (DST): UTC−04:00 (-4)
- Elevation AMSL: 813 ft (248 m)
- Coordinates: 41°00′43″N 083°40′07″W

Map
- Location within Ohio Location within the United States

Runways
Direction	Length		Surface
Direction	ft	m	Surface
18/36	6,499	1,981	Asphalt
7/25	5,883	1,793	Asphalt

Statistics (2021)
- Aircraft operations: 24,550
- Based aircraft: 26
- Source: Federal Aviation Administration

Findlay Airport (IATA: FDY, ICAO: KFDY, FAA LID: FDY) is 1 mile (1.6 km) southwest of Findlay, in Hancock County, Ohio.

== History ==
In 1933, the Ohio Oil Company leased the 120-acre (49 ha) Rummel Airport for ten years, renaming it Findlay Airport. Plans at the time called for the construction of 2,400-foot (730 m) and 2,100-foot (640 m) runways in an X layout.

Operation of the airport was taken over by Ray B. Vaughn in mid 1941 after the previous manager, Mike Murphy, was called up by the Army Air Corps. The Ohio Oil Company moved to a new hangar at the airport in November 1946.

A project to lengthen the runway to 5,000 feet (1,500 m) and add hangar space was underway in December 1953. The construction of twelve new hangars was almost complete in December 1959.

Lake Central Airlines scheduled flights to Findlay from 1961 until 1965-66. In the late 1960s, Northern Airlines provided commuter service to Findlay. The airline provided 6 weekday departures (fewer on weekends). Three of the flights were nonstop to Cleveland Hopkins International and three to Lima, Ohio, continuing to St. Mary's, Ohio and Dayton, Ohio.

Due to the lack of a passenger terminal, the airport's facilities were deemed to be inadequate for scheduled air service in 1961 and again in 1964.An effort to obtain a state grant for such a building failed in 1970 when it was ruled that public funds could not be used for a privately owned airport. Another attempt begun in 1973 was successful, after it was agreed to build the 1,800 sq ft (170 m^{2}) structure on county-owned land. Dedication of the Hancock Air Terminal was announced in October 1975.

The city considered purchasing the airport in 1992. The airport was operated by Marathon Oil Company until 1993. The following year, over twenty companies were vying to operate the airport and a 1,275-foot (389 m) extension for the north-south runway, which would partially offset a reduction in length, was being planned. Crow Executive Air of Metcalf Field was selected in January 1995. However, the offer was rescinded five months later when the city instead favored Cooper Tire. Crow subsequently sued for breach of contract.

The airport received a grant for a runway and taxiway extension in August 2000. After initially being allocated $4.95 million from the federal stimulus in April 2009 for the construction of a taxiway, a government watchdog said the airport should not receive the funding because it does not see enough traffic.

The airport did receive nearly $2 million from the US Department of Transportation in 2022 to build a new aircraft parking area, allowing the airport to receive larger aircraft, improve drainage, and improve pavement markings. An adjacent tie-down apron and the taxilane to the airport's t-hangars were also upgraded. Some federal funds were provided by the Bipartisan Infrastructure Law, and additional funds were provided by the State of Ohio and the city of Findlay.

== Facilities and aircraft ==
=== Facilities ===
Findlay Airport covers 338 acres (137 ha) at an elevation of 813 feet (248 m). It has two runways: runway 18/36 is 6,499 by 100 ft (1,981 x 30 m) and runway 7/25 is 5,883 by 100 ft (1,793 x 30 m.

The airport has a fixed-base operator that offers fuel, both avgas and jet fuel, and amenities such as courtesy transportation, WiFi, a conference room, a crew lounge, and more.

=== Aircraft ===
In the year ending July 15, 2021, the airport had 24,550 aircraft operations, average 67 per day: 98% general aviation, 2% air taxi and <1% military. For the same period, 26 aircraft were based at the airport: 20 airplanes, including 19 single-engine and 1 multi-engine, and 6 jets.

== Accidents and incidents ==
- On 3 August 1930, a cabin airplane crashed into a tent during a carnival at the airport, killing a child and injuring a woman on the ground and injuring the pilot and four passengers.
- On 28 May 1936, a Waco crashed while preparing to land at the airport, killing the pilot.
- On December 10, 1963 a Douglas A-26 Invader stalled and crashed during a landing approach, killing 3 in the plane.
- On November 3, 1967, a Cessna 421 Golden Eagle crashed while on a demonstration flight for new customers. While on approach to Findlay, the aircraft got too low, and the pilot did not correct. The aircraft struck trees short of the runway. The probable cause of the accident was found to be the improper IFR operation on part of the pilot-in-command who misjudged altitude and misread instruments/altimeter settings.
- On December 12, 1972, a Hawker-Siddeley HS.125-3A crashed on approach to Findlay. The crew encountered below minima weather conditions with fog and low ceiling. Unable to locate the runway, the captain decided to abandon the approach and initiated a go-around. The second approach was also missed, but on the third approach, the pilots descended below minimums on the instrument approach. The aircraft struck tree tops, stalled, and crashed into a wooded area a few yards short of the airport.
- On 20 December 1997, a Beechcraft A36 Bonanza crashed after taking off from the airport, killing the three occupants.
- On February 22, 2022, a Piper PA32 Cherokee Six crashed while attempting an instrument approach at Findlay. Witnesses reported hearing a loud engine or low RPM noise followed by silence, while others said the plane's lights disappeared into houses around 150-250 AGL. An investigation is ongoing.

== See also ==
- List of airports in Ohio
