= Van Buren, Ohio =

- Village
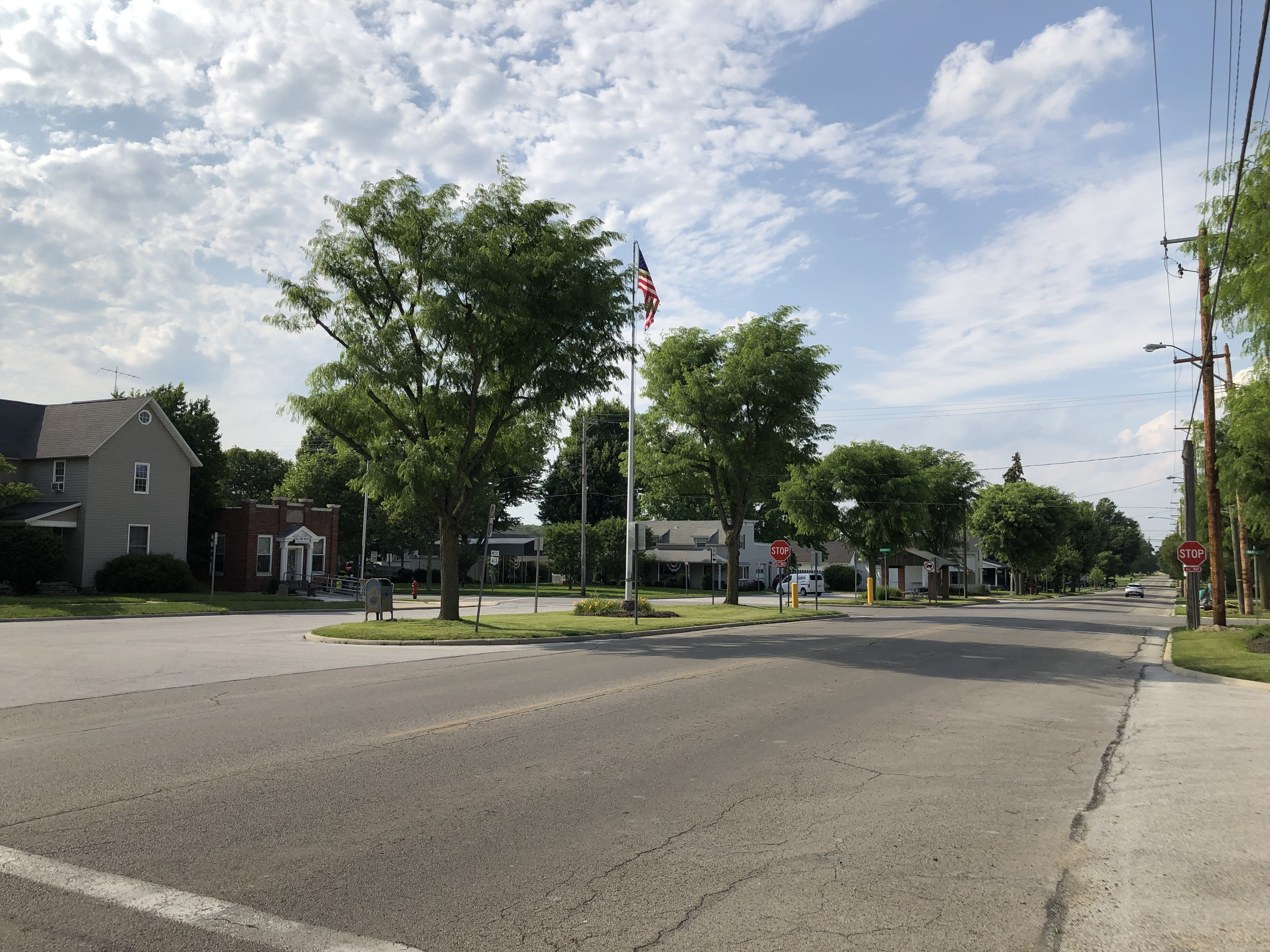
- Main Street in Van Buren, Ohio

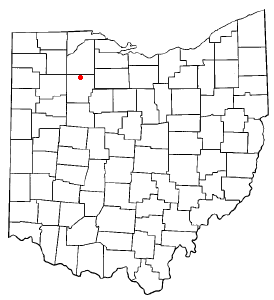
- Location of Van Buren, Ohio

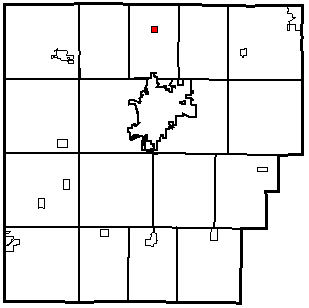
- Location within Hancock County
- Coordinates: 41°08′19″N 83°38′58″W
- Country: United States
- State: Ohio
- County: Hancock

Government
  - Type: Village council

Area
  - Total: 0.26 sq mi (0.67 km^{2})
  - Land: 0.26 sq mi (0.67 km^{2})
  - Water: 0 sq mi (0.00 km^{2})
- Elevation: 768 ft (234 m)

Population (2020)
  - Total: 396
  - Density: 1,536.9/sq mi (593.39/km^{2})
- Time zone: UTC-5 (Eastern (EST))
  - Summer (DST): UTC-4 (EDT)
- ZIP code: 45889
- Area code: 419
- FIPS code: 39-79394
- GNIS feature ID: 2400043

Van Buren is a village in Hancock County, Ohio, United States. The population was 396 at the 2020 census.

== History ==
Van Buren was laid out in 1833, and named after Martin Van Buren, who was then the incumbent Vice President (1833–1837) and later became President of the United States (1837–1841). The village was incorporated in 1866.

The first schoolhouse in Allen Township was a small log structure built in 1836. It was built of round logs with a clapboard roof, had greased paper windows and a huge fireplace at one end. About 1870 a two-room brick building was built on East Market Street. This building was later condemned and a four-room school was erected and used till 1917 when the schools of Allen Township were centralized and the present school, Van Buren High School, was erected.

A post office called Van Buren has been in operation since 1835.

Van Buren is also home to the Van Buren State Park. Van Buren State Park's history traces back to its origins as a designated wildlife preserve. In 1939, the construction of a dam on Rocky Ford Creek was undertaken to enhance the area's fish and wildlife resources. By 1950, the stewardship of this land was transferred to Ohio State Parks, where it has remained as a cherished state park ever since. This park bears the name of Martin Van Buren, the nation's eighth President.

Once home to the Shawnee people, the environment surrounding Van Buren State Park is characterized by woodlands and agricultural lands. Comprising 296 acres, the park serves as a green space, available year-round for visitors to partake in activities such as camping, fishing, hiking, horseback riding, and picnicking.

== Geography ==
According to the United States Census Bureau, the village has a total area of 0.26 square miles (0.67 km^{2}), all land.

== Demographics ==
Historical population
Census	Pop.	Note	%±
1840	74		—
1850	122		64.9%
1870	157		—
1880	130		−17.2%
1890	268		106.2%
1900	367		36.9%
1910	303		−17.4%
1920	273		−9.9%
1930	279		2.2%
1940	307		10.0%
1950	308		0.3%
1960	374		21.4%
1970	319		−14.7%
1980	342		7.2%
1990	337		−1.5%
2000	313		−7.1%
2010	328		4.8%
2020	396		20.7%
U.S. Decennial Census

=== 2010 census ===
As of the census of 2010, there were 328 people, 119 households, and 98 families living in the village. The population density was 1,261.5 inhabitants per square mile (487.1/km^{2}). There were 128 housing units at an average density of 492.3 per square mile (190.1/km^{2}). The racial makeup of the village was 97.3% White, 1.8% from other races, and 0.9% from two or more races. Hispanic or Latino of any race were 4.3% of the population.

There were 119 households, of which 41.2% had children under the age of 18 living with them, 64.7% were married couples living together, 10.9% had a female householder with no husband present, 6.7% had a male householder with no wife present, and 17.6% were non-families. 14.3% of all households were made up of individuals, and 4.2% had someone living alone who was 65 years of age or older. The average household size was 2.76 and the average family size was 3.01.

The median age in the village was 34.5 years. 30.5% of residents were under the age of 18; 4.5% were between the ages of 18 and 24; 28.3% were from 25 to 44; 23.8% were from 45 to 64; and 12.8% were 65 years of age or older. The gender makeup of the village was 49.7% male and 50.3% female.

=== 2000 census ===
As of the census of 2000, there were 313 people, 113 households, and 91 families living in the village. The population density was 1,257.5 inhabitants per square mile (485.5/km^{2}). There were 116 housing units at an average density of 466.0 per square mile (179.9/km^{2}). The racial makeup of the village was 97.12% White, 0.32% African American, 0.96% from other races, and 1.60% from two or more races. Hispanic or Latino of any race were 4.15% of the population.

There were 113 households, out of which 43.4% had children under the age of 18 living with them, 69.0% were married couples living together, 6.2% had a female householder with no husband present, and 18.6% were non-families. 16.8% of all households were made up of individuals, and 8.0% had someone living alone who was 65 years of age or older. The average household size was 2.77 and the average family size was 3.12.

In the village, the population was spread out, with 29.1% under the age of 18, 5.8% from 18 to 24, 30.0% from 25 to 44, 25.9% from 45 to 64, and 9.3% who were 65 years of age or older. The median age was 36 years. For every 100 females there were 93.2 males. For every 100 females age 18 and over, there were 93.0 males.

The median household income in the village was $48,750, while the median family income was $55,625. Males had a median income of $42,188 versus $26,250 for females. The per capita income for the village was $20,061. About 1.1% of families and 1.7% of the population were below the poverty line, including none of those under the age of eighteen or sixty-five or over.

== See also ==
- Van Buren State Park
- Van Buren High School
