= Blanchard Township, Hancock County, Ohio =

Township in Ohio, US

- Township
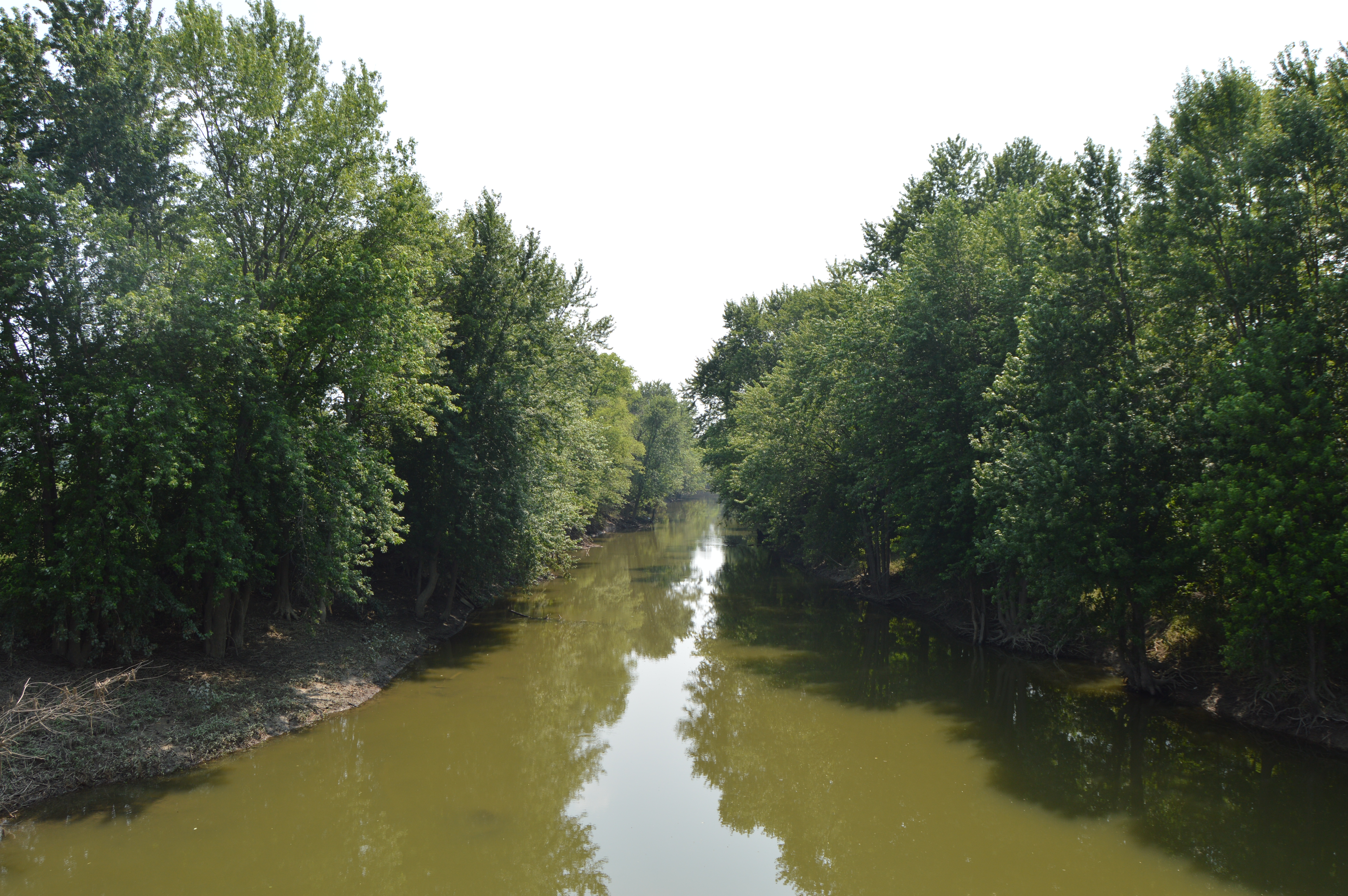
- The Blanchard River north of Benton Ridge

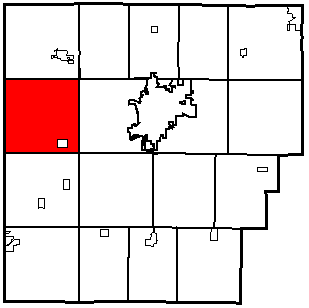
- Location of Blanchard Township in Hancock County
- Coordinates: 41°1′7″N 83°48′23″W
- Country: United States
- State: Ohio
- County: Hancock

Area
  - Total: 36.27 sq mi (93.94 km^{2})
  - Land: 36.24 sq mi (93.87 km^{2})
  - Water: 0.027 sq mi (0.07 km^{2})
- Elevation: 751 ft (229 m)

Population (2020)
  - Total: 1,130
  - Density: 31.2/sq mi (12.0/km^{2})
- Time zone: UTC-5 (Eastern (EST))
  - Summer (DST): UTC-4 (EDT)
- FIPS code: 39-06838
- GNIS feature ID: 1086241

Blanchard Township is one of the seventeen townships of Hancock County, Ohio, United States. As of the 2020 census the population was 1,130.

== Geography ==
Located in the western part of the county, it borders the following townships:

- Pleasant Township - North
- Portage Township - Northeast corner
- Liberty Township - East
- Eagle Township - Southeast corner
- Union Township - South
- Riley Township, Putnam County - Southwest corner
- Blanchard Township, Putnam County - West
- Van Buren Township, Putnam County - Northwest corner

The village of Benton Ridge is located in southeastern Blanchard Township.

== Name and history ==
Statewide, other Blanchard Townships are located in Hardin and Putnam counties.

Blanchard Township was organized in 1831. The township was named for a stream that runs through it.

== Government ==
The township is governed by a three-member board of trustees, who are elected in November of odd-numbered years to a four-year term beginning on the following January 1. Two are elected in the year after the presidential election and one is elected in the year before it. There is also an elected township fiscal officer, who serves a four-year term beginning on April 1 of the year after the election, which is held in November of the year before the presidential election. Vacancies in the fiscal officership or on the board of trustees are filled by the remaining trustees.
