= Van Buren State Park (Ohio) =

Park in Ohio, USA

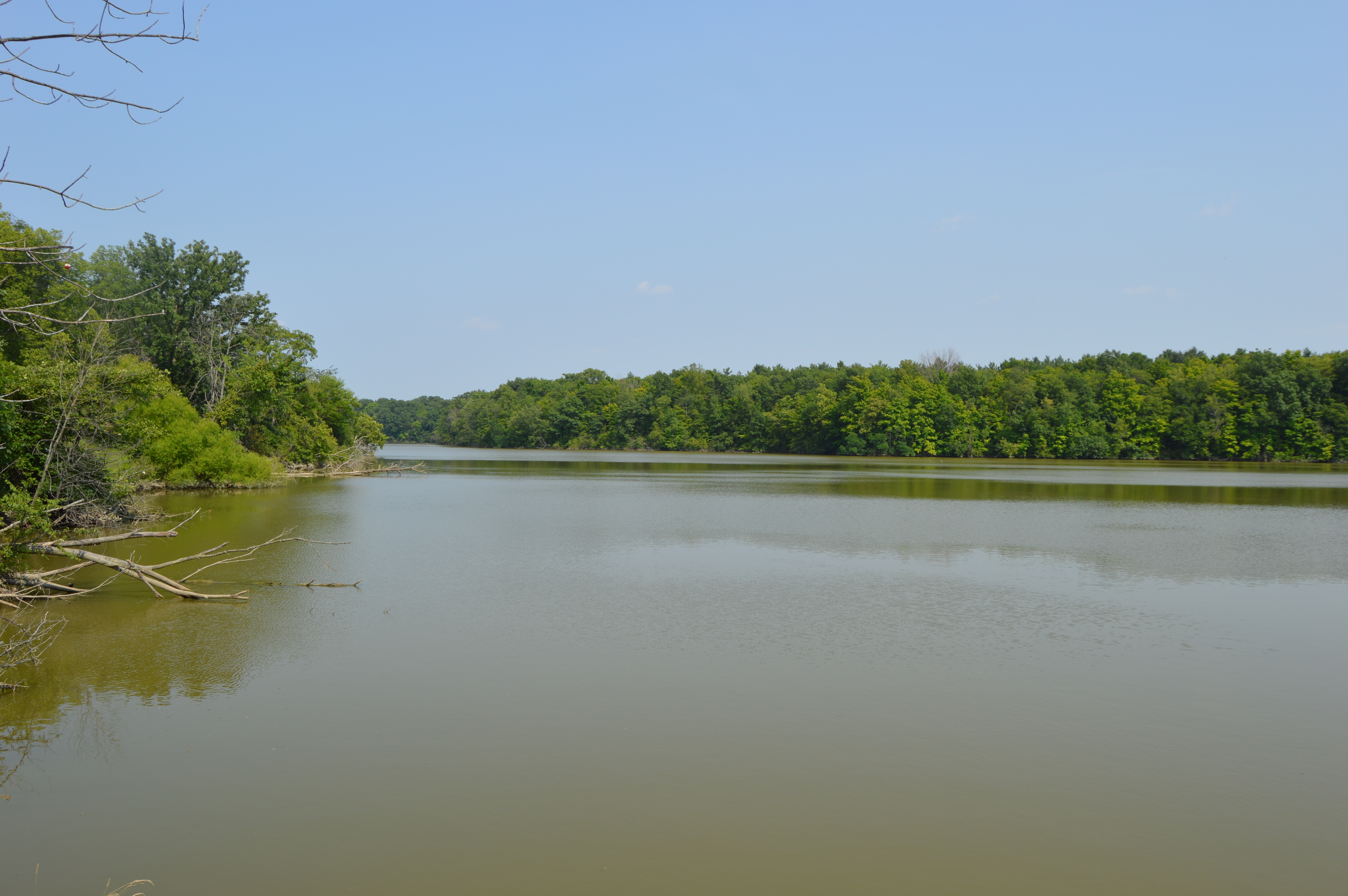
- Van Buren Lake

- Location within Ohio Location within the United States
- Location: Hancock County, Ohio, United States
- Coordinates: 41°08′00″N 83°38′39″W
- Area: 296 acres (120 ha)
- Elevation: 751 feet (229 m)
- Established: 1950
- Administrator: Ohio Department of Natural Resources
- Designation: Ohio state park
- Website: Van Buren State Park

Van Buren State Park is a public recreation area in Hancock County, Ohio, in the United States. The state park covers 296 acres (120 ha) abutting the southern boundary of the village of Van Buren and offers camping, hiking, bicycling and other recreational activities.

== History ==
The process of creating the park began in 1939 when a dam was built over Rocky Ford Creek creating Van Buren Lake as part of a private wildlife preserve. The lake and preserve were transferred to the state of Ohio for use as a state park in 1950. The dam was notched and removed in August 2025, draining the lake as part of the Rocky Ford Creek restoration.

== Ecology ==
Van Buren State Park is in a rich agricultural area. Northwest Ohio is part of the Interior Plains region of North America. The land is largely flat with a few hills that are a remnant of the last ice age. Beneath the topsoil lies a layer of dolomitic limestone.

The park is in a small patch of woods surrounded by thousands of acres of fields of corn, wheat and soybeans. The land was largely forested before it was cleared by farmers. A small patch of woodland, made mostly of beech and sugar maple trees, remains at Van Buren State Park. Typical woodland mammals found in the park include white-tailed deer, red fox, red squirrel, skunk, and opossum. Bird species include the cowbird, woodcock, eastern bluebird, short-eared owl and eastern meadowlark. The park is also home to garter snakes and spring peepers. Wildflowers in the area include chicory, spring beauty, Dutchman's breeches, daisy fleabane and thimbleweed.

== Activities and amenities ==
The park features trails for hikers, mountain bikers and horseback riders, and primitive, full-service and equestrian camping. Hunting is limited to bowhunting.
