= Hancock County, Ohio =

County in Ohio, United States

- County
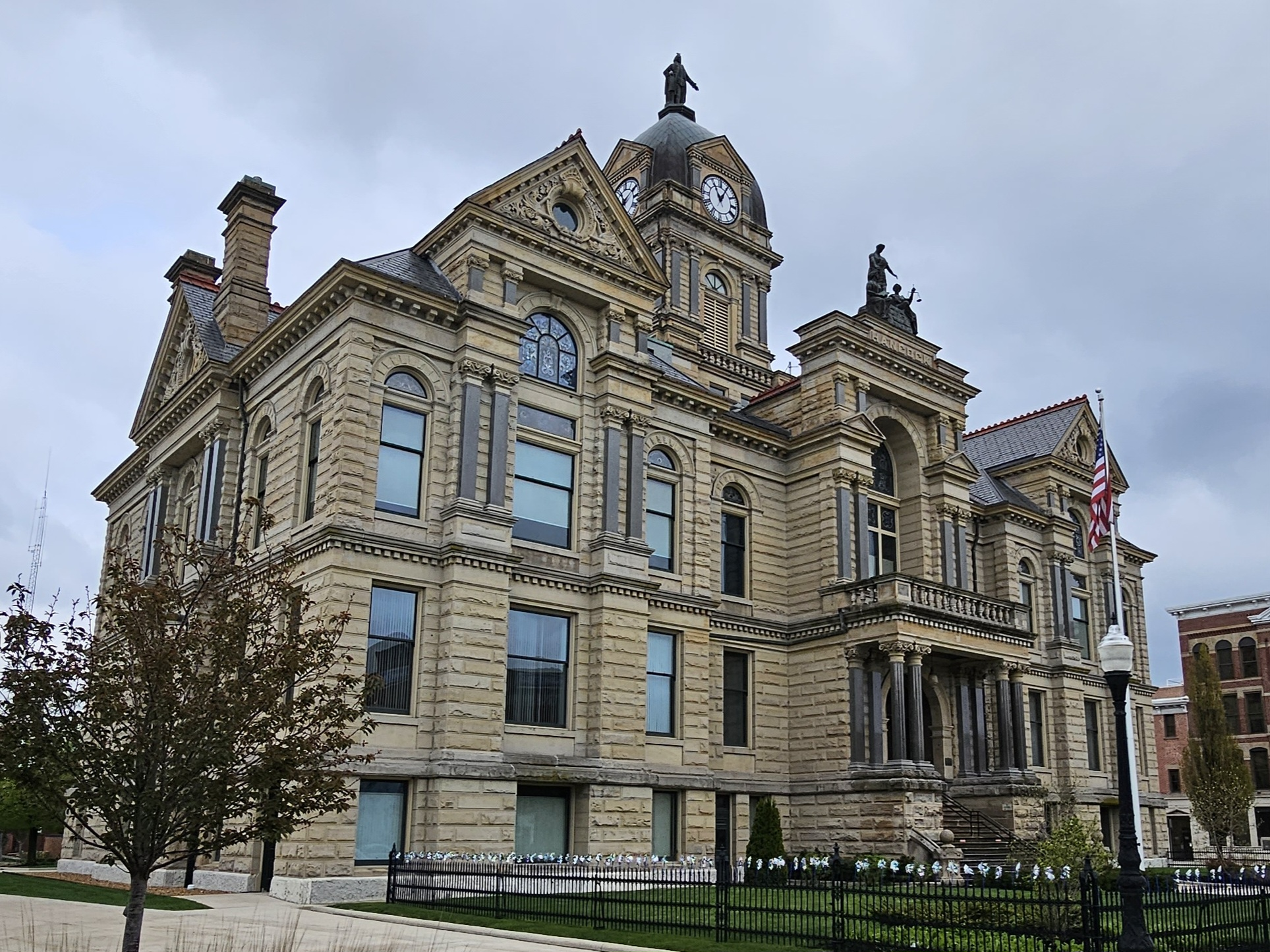
- The Hancock County Courthouse in Findlay

- Flag Seal

- Location within the U.S. state of Ohio
- Coordinates: 41°00′N 83°40′W
- Country: United States
- State: Ohio
- Founded: March 1, 1828
- Named for: John Hancock
- Seat: Findlay
- Largest city: Findlay

Area
  - Total: 534 sq mi (1,380 km^{2})
  - Land: 531 sq mi (1,380 km^{2})
  - Water: 2.3 sq mi (6.0 km^{2}) 0.4%

Population (2020)
  - Total: 74,920
  - Estimate (2025): 75,034 ▲
  - Density: 141/sq mi (54.5/km^{2})
- Time zone: UTC−5 (Eastern)
  - Summer (DST): UTC−4 (EDT)
- Congressional district: 5th
- Website: www.co.hancock.oh.us

Hancock County is a county located in the U.S. state of Ohio. As of the 2020 census, the population was 74,920. Its county seat and largest city is Findlay. The county was created in 1820 and later organized in 1828. It was named for John Hancock, the first signer of the Declaration of Independence. Hancock County comprises the Findlay, Ohio Micropolitan Statistical Area.

== History ==
Hancock County was established on January 21, 1828, by the Ohio General Assembly from the southern portions of Wood County. Originally containing only Findlay Township, the county would add Amanda and Welfare (now Delaware) townships later in April of that year. Additional townships were laid out as follows: Jackson in 1829; Liberty and Marion in December 1830; Big Lick, Blanchard, and Van Buren in 1831; Washington, Union, and Eagle in 1832; Cass and Portage in 1833; Pleasant in 1835; Orange in 1836; Madison in 1840, and finally Allen in 1850. Originally nearly 24 miles square, Hancock County would lose some of its southeast portion in 1845 to the new Wyandot County.

== Geography ==
According to the U.S. Census Bureau, the county has a total area of 534 square miles (1,380 km^{2}), of which 531 square miles (1,380 km^{2}) is land and 2.3 square miles (6.0 km^{2}) (0.4%) is water.

=== Adjacent counties ===
- Wood County (north)
- Seneca County (northeast)
- Wyandot County (southeast)
- Hardin County (south)
- Allen County (southwest)
- Putnam County (west)
- Henry County (northwest)

== Demographics ==
Historical population
Census	Pop.	Note	%±
1830	813		—
1840	9,986		1,128.3%
1850	16,751		67.7%
1860	22,886		36.6%
1870	23,847		4.2%
1880	27,784		16.5%
1890	42,563		53.2%
1900	41,993		−1.3%
1910	37,860		−9.8%
1920	38,394		1.4%
1930	40,404		5.2%
1940	40,793		1.0%
1950	44,280		8.5%
1960	53,686		21.2%
1970	61,217		14.0%
1980	64,581		5.5%
1990	65,536		1.5%
2000	71,295		8.8%
2010	74,782		4.9%
2020	74,920		0.2%
2025 (est.)	75,034	▲	0.2%
U.S. Decennial Census; 1790–1960 1900–1990; 1990–2000 2020

=== 2020 census ===
As of the 2020 census, the county had a population of 74,920. The median age was 40.3 years. 22.0% of residents were under the age of 18 and 18.6% of residents were 65 years of age or older. For every 100 females there were 96.5 males, and for every 100 females age 18 and over there were 94.3 males age 18 and over.

The racial makeup of the county was 88.9% White, 1.9% Black or African American, 0.2% American Indian and Alaska Native, 1.9% Asian, <0.1% Native Hawaiian and Pacific Islander, 1.7% from some other race, and 5.4% from two or more races. Hispanic or Latino residents of any race comprised 5.6% of the population.

68.2% of residents lived in urban areas, while 31.8% lived in rural areas.

There were 31,107 households in the county, of which 27.2% had children under the age of 18 living in them. Of all households, 48.5% were married-couple households, 19.3% were households with a male householder and no spouse or partner present, and 25.0% were households with a female householder and no spouse or partner present. About 30.8% of all households were made up of individuals and 12.4% had someone living alone who was 65 years of age or older.

There were 33,655 housing units, of which 7.6% were vacant. Among occupied housing units, 70.2% were owner-occupied and 29.8% were renter-occupied. The homeowner vacancy rate was 1.5% and the rental vacancy rate was 10.2%.

=== Racial and ethnic composition ===
Hancock County, Ohio – racial and ethnic composition Note: the US Census treats Hispanic/Latino as an ethnic category. This table excludes Latinos from the racial categories and assigns them to a separate category. Hispanics/Latinos may be of any race.
Race / ethnicity (NH = Non-Hispanic)	Pop 1980	Pop 1990	Pop 2000	Pop 2010	Pop 2020	% 1980	% 1990	% 2000	% 2010	% 2020
White alone (NH)	62,299	62,808	66,733	67,888	65,107	96.47%	95.84%	93.60%	90.78%	86.90%
Black or African American alone (NH)	510	562	756	1,084	1,363	0.79%	0.86%	1.06%	1.45%	1.82%
Native American or Alaska Native alone (NH)	62	81	119	127	79	0.10%	0.12%	0.17%	0.17%	0.11%
Asian alone (NH)	191	383	865	1,258	1,393	0.30%	0.58%	1.21%	1.68%	1.86%
Native Hawaiian or Pacific Islander alone (NH)	x	x	11	11	26	x	x	0.02%	0.01%	0.03%
Other race alone (NH)	87	22	45	68	220	0.13%	0.03%	0.06%	0.09%	0.29%
Mixed-race or multiracial (NH)	x	x	579	983	2,534	x	x	0.81%	1.31%	3.38%
Hispanic or Latino (any race)	1,432	1,680	2,187	3,363	4,198	2.22%	2.56%	3.07%	4.50%	5.60%
Total	64,581	65,536	71,295	74,782	74,920	100.00%	100.00%	100.00%	100.00%	100.00%

=== 2010 census ===
As of the 2010 United States census, there were 74,782 people, 30,197 households, and 19,884 families living in the county. The population density was 140.7 inhabitants per square mile (54.3/km^{2}). There were 33,174 housing units at an average density of 62.4 units per square mile (24.1 units/km^{2}). The racial makeup of the county was 93.4% white, 1.7% Asian, 1.5% black or African American, 0.2% American Indian, 1.4% from other races, and 1.8% from two or more races. Those of Hispanic or Latino origin made up 4.5% of the population. In terms of ancestry, 43.1% were German, 11.0% were Irish, 10.3% were English, and 6.6% were American.

Of the 30,197 households, 30.7% had children under the age of 18 living with them, 51.3% were married couples living together, 10.0% had a female householder with no husband present, 34.2% were non-families, and 27.9% of all households were made up of individuals. The average household size was 2.42 and the average family size was 2.94. The median age was 38.5 years.

The median income for a household in the county was $49,070 and the median income for a family was $59,600. Males had a median income of $42,479 versus $31,631 for females. The per capita income for the county was $25,158. About 8.5% of families and 11.4% of the population were below the poverty line, including 15.2% of those under age 18 and 5.7% of those age 65 or over.

=== 2000 census ===
As of the census of 2000, there were 71,295 people, 27,898 households, and 19,138 families living in the county. The population density was 134 inhabitants per square mile (52/km^{2}). There were 29,785 housing units at an average density of 56 units per square mile (22/km^{2}). The racial makeup of the county was 95.14% White, 1.11% Black or African American, 0.18% Native American, 1.22% Asian, 0.02% Pacific Islander, 1.22% from other races, and 1.12% from two or more races. 3.07% of the population were Hispanic or Latino of any race.

There were 27,898 households, out of which 32.60% had children under the age of 18 living with them, 56.40% were married couples living together, 8.70% had a female householder with no husband present, and 31.40% were non-families. 26.00% of all households were made up of individuals, and 9.80% had someone living alone who was 65 years of age or older. The average household size was 2.49 and the average family size was 3.01.

In the county, the population was spread out, with 25.70% under the age of 18, 9.70% from 18 to 24, 28.70% from 25 to 44, 22.60% from 45 to 64, and 13.20% who were 65 years of age or older. The median age was 36 years. For every 100 females there were 94.30 males. For every 100 females age 18 and over, there were 91.20 males.

The median income for a household in the county was $43,856, and the median income for a family was $51,490. Males had a median income of $37,139 versus $24,374 for females. The per capita income for the county was $20,991. About 5.20% of families and 7.50% of the population were below the poverty line, including 8.80% of those under age 18 and 6.10% of those age 65 or over.

== Communities ==
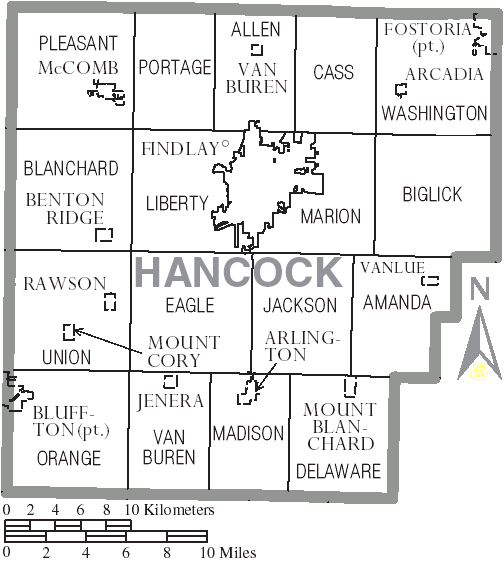
Map of Hancock County, with municipal and township labels

=== Cities ===
- Findlay (county seat)
- Fostoria

=== Villages ===
- Arcadia
- Arlington
- Benton Ridge
- Bluffton
- Jenera
- McComb
- Mount Blanchard
- Mount Cory
- Rawson
- Van Buren
- Vanlue

=== Townships ===
- Allen
- Amanda
- Biglick
- Blanchard
- Cass
- Delaware
- Eagle
- Jackson
- Liberty
- Madison
- Marion
- Orange
- Pleasant
- Portage
- Union
- Van Buren
- Washington

=== Unincorporated communities ===
- Cannonsburg
- Cordelia
- Deweyville
- Houcktown
- Mortimer
- New Stark
- Portage Center
- Shawtown
- West Independence
- Williamstown

=== Ghost town ===
- Moffit

== Government ==
Seal of the auditor of Hancock County

== Politics ==
Although in the period up to World War I Hancock County's German heritage caused it to lean Democratic, since that war – when German Americans were driven from the Democratic Party by Woodrow Wilson’s postwar settlement policies and James M. Cox’s refusal to accept German language instruction – the county has been powerfully Republican. Since 1920, no Democratic presidential candidate has obtained an absolute majority of Hancock County's vote, although Franklin D. Roosevelt did win narrow pluralities in his 1932 and 1936 landslides. It was one of just five Ohio counties that voted for Barry Goldwater over Lyndon B. Johnson in 1964. Although Goldwater won by just sixty-three votes, no Democratic presidential nominee since has cracked three-eighths (37.5%) of the county's vote.

United States presidential election results for Hancock County, Ohio
Year	Republican		Democratic		Third party(ies)	
Year	No.	%	No.	%	No.	%
1856	1,773	47.23%	1,944	51.78%	37	0.99%
1860	2,135	47.70%	2,301	51.41%	40	0.89%
1864	2,178	48.64%	2,300	51.36%	0	0.00%
1868	2,279	47.41%	2,528	52.59%	0	0.00%
1872	2,311	48.52%	2,449	51.42%	3	0.06%
1876	2,811	46.59%	3,215	53.28%	8	0.13%
1880	3,124	47.94%	3,350	51.41%	42	0.64%
1884	3,245	47.32%	3,497	50.99%	116	1.69%
1888	4,634	48.49%	4,539	47.49%	384	4.02%
1892	4,780	46.44%	4,931	47.91%	582	5.65%
1896	5,591	49.66%	5,546	49.26%	121	1.07%
1900	5,559	50.14%	5,322	48.01%	205	1.85%
1904	5,766	55.30%	4,148	39.79%	512	4.91%
1908	4,899	45.44%	5,420	50.27%	462	4.29%
1912	2,241	24.79%	4,309	47.66%	2,491	27.55%
1916	4,268	42.78%	5,416	54.29%	292	2.93%
1920	9,746	59.46%	6,386	38.96%	258	1.57%
1924	9,167	57.03%	5,111	31.80%	1,796	11.17%
1928	13,151	75.54%	4,158	23.88%	101	0.58%
1932	9,260	48.58%	9,370	49.16%	431	2.26%
1936	9,816	47.23%	9,929	47.77%	1,039	5.00%
1940	14,174	64.64%	7,755	35.36%	0	0.00%
1944	13,450	68.27%	6,252	31.73%	0	0.00%
1948	11,427	63.21%	6,598	36.50%	54	0.30%
1952	14,999	73.65%	5,366	26.35%	0	0.00%
1956	15,713	74.82%	5,289	25.18%	0	0.00%
1960	17,059	71.76%	6,712	28.24%	0	0.00%
1964	11,610	50.14%	11,547	49.86%	0	0.00%
1968	15,032	61.08%	6,918	28.11%	2,659	10.80%
1972	18,111	70.68%	6,084	23.74%	1,429	5.58%
1976	15,983	63.09%	8,548	33.74%	802	3.17%
1980	18,264	67.62%	6,843	25.34%	1,903	7.05%
1984	22,169	78.34%	5,758	20.35%	370	1.31%
1988	19,896	71.97%	7,435	26.90%	312	1.13%
1992	16,821	52.63%	7,944	24.85%	7,198	22.52%
1996	17,252	57.68%	9,334	31.21%	3,322	11.11%
2000	20,985	68.54%	8,798	28.74%	834	2.72%
2004	25,105	70.48%	10,352	29.06%	162	0.45%
2008	22,420	60.50%	13,870	37.43%	765	2.06%
2012	22,443	62.72%	12,564	35.11%	776	2.17%
2016	24,183	66.74%	9,609	26.52%	2,442	6.74%
2020	26,310	67.86%	11,757	30.32%	704	1.82%
2024	26,052	68.53%	11,467	30.16%	499	1.31%

United States Senate election results for Hancock County, Ohio1
Year	Republican		Democratic		Third party(ies)	
Year	No.	%	No.	%	No.	%
2024	23,803	63.44%	12,170	32.44%	1,547	4.12%

== See also ==
- National Register of Historic Places listings in Hancock County, Ohio
