= Toledo Zoo & Aquarium =

Zoo in Toledo, Ohio, US

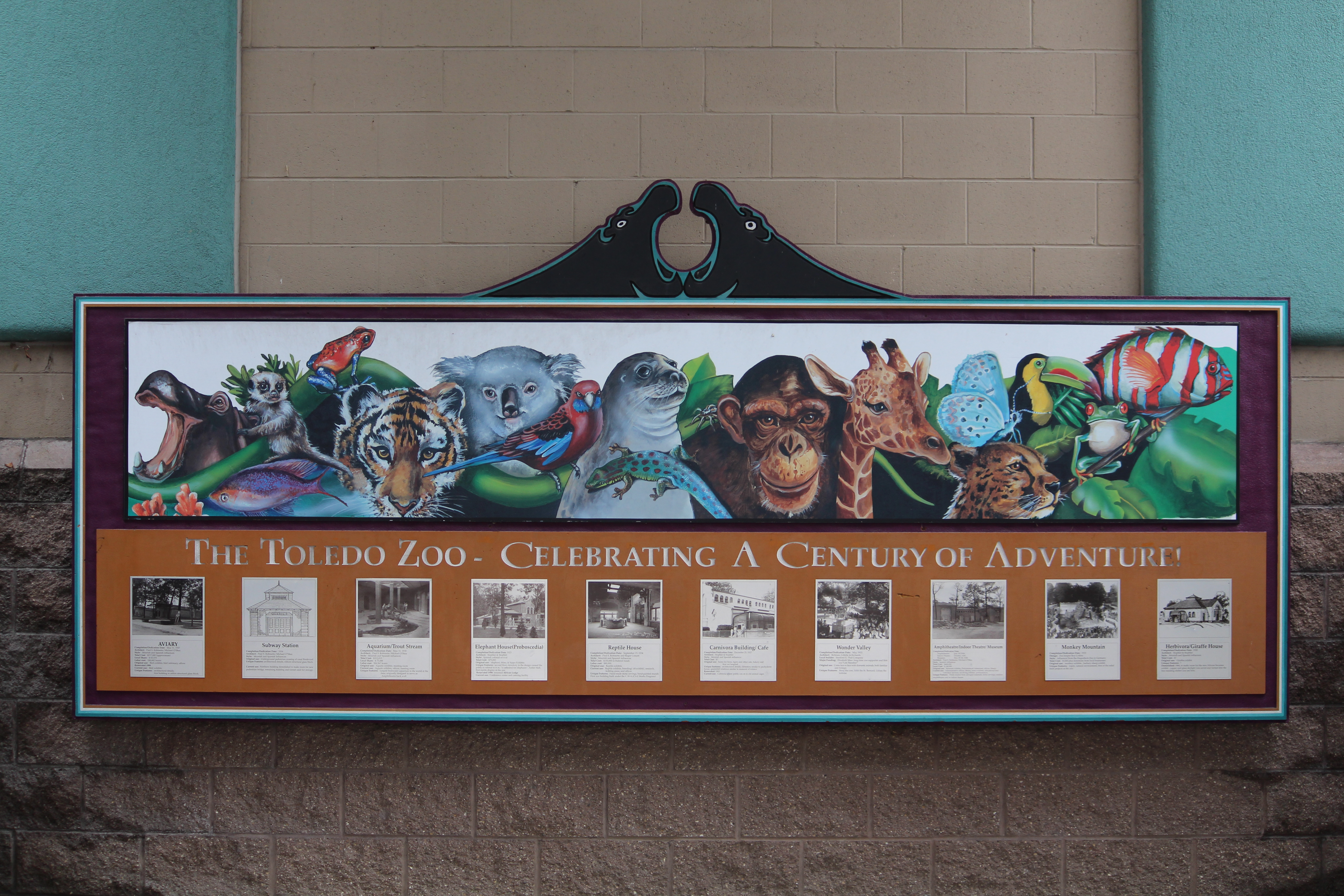
- Interactive map of Toledo Zoo & Aquarium
- 41.6191°N 83.5807°W
- Date opened: 1900
- Location: Toledo, Ohio, United States
- Land area: 51 acres (21 ha) on south side
- No. of animals: 10,000 +
- No. of species: 720
- Memberships: AZA, WAZA, BFCI
- Major exhibits: Africa!, Aquarium, Arctic Encounter, Aviary, Maned Wolf, Bald Eagles, The Valley, Nature's Neighborhood, ProMedica Museum of Natural History, Primate Forest, Reptile House, Snow Leopards, Flamingo Key, Tiger Terrace, Ziems Conservatory, Tembo Trail, Penguin Beach, Cassowary Crossing, Galapagos Gardens
- Public transit: TARTA
- Website: www.toledozoo.org

The Toledo Zoo & Aquarium, located in Toledo, Ohio is a member of the World Association of Zoos and Aquariums (WAZA), and is accredited by the Association of Zoos and Aquariums (AZA). The Toledo Zoo & Aquarium, rated the top zoo in the country, houses over 10,000 individual animals from 720 species and participates in around 80 species survival programs.

== History ==
=== 1900–1920 ===
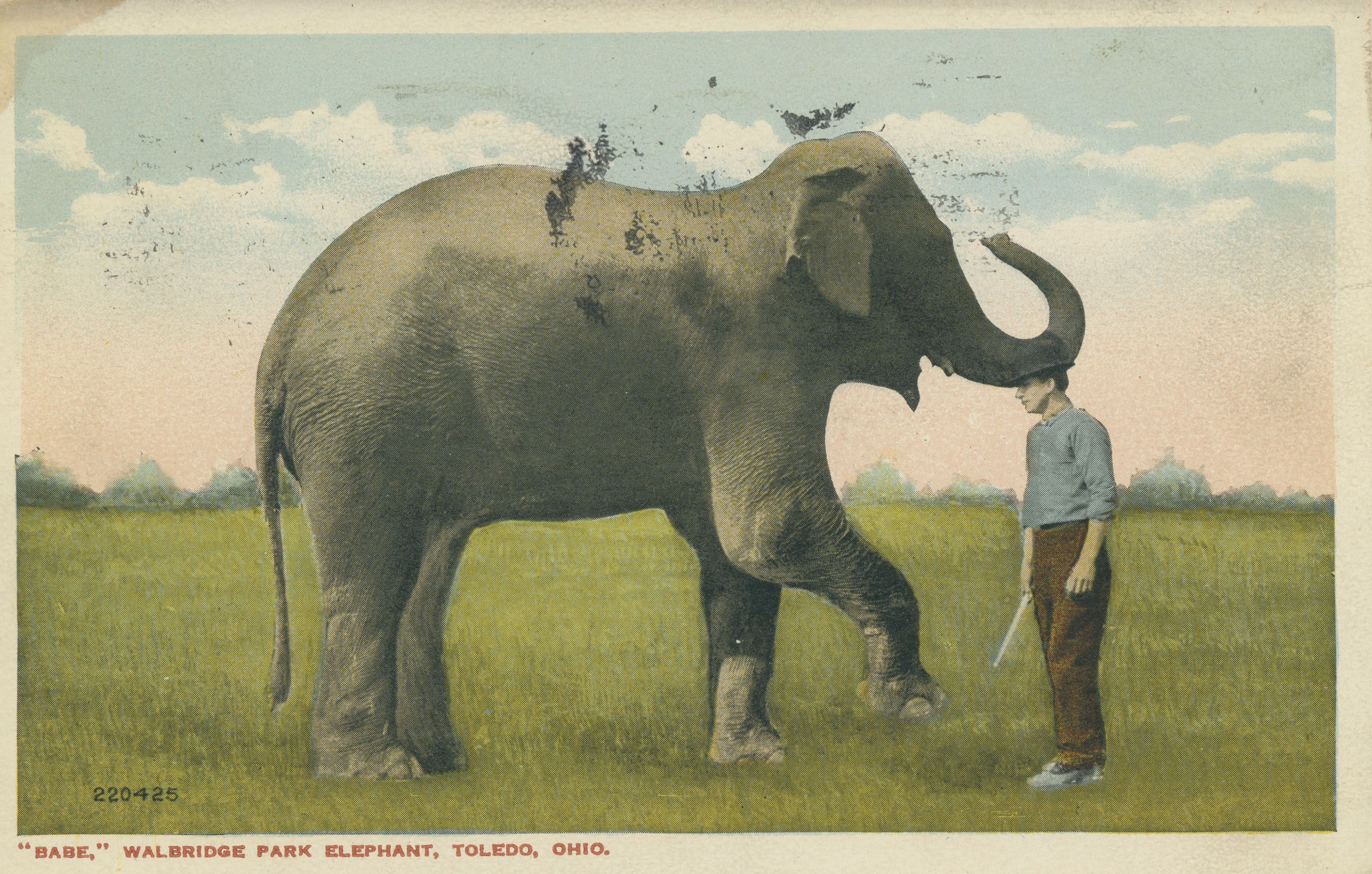
Babe the elephant at Walbridge Park, 1916.

The Toledo Zoo began in 1900 when a woodchuck was donated by Megan Cole to the Walbridge Park. By the end of its first year, the Toledo Zoo had a collection of 39 animals, most of which were donated. The park was unprepared for these donations and was forced to use temporary housing such as ravines and boxes for exhibits. In November 1901, the Toledo Zoo nearly lost its entire collection when the winter housing for the animals caught fire. As a result, in 1907, the Toledo Zoo built its first brick building for housing animals, known as the Lion House. During the early years at the Toledo Zoo, most animals were acquired through donations and circuses, and, due to a lack of proper housing, animal escapes were common. In June 1913, the Toledo Zoological Society (TZS) was founded to spur development with William H. Roemer serving as the first president. By 1916, the Toledo Zoo had grown to a population of 471 animals. In 1922, a change to the organizational structure of the zoo occurred when Percy Jones, the TZS president, created the role of Zoo Director, also known as the Curator of the Toledo Zoo & Aquarium. Frank Skeldon was the first curator for the zoo. Jones and Skeldon pushed the zoo towards national recognition.

=== 1920–1929: Before the Great Depression ===
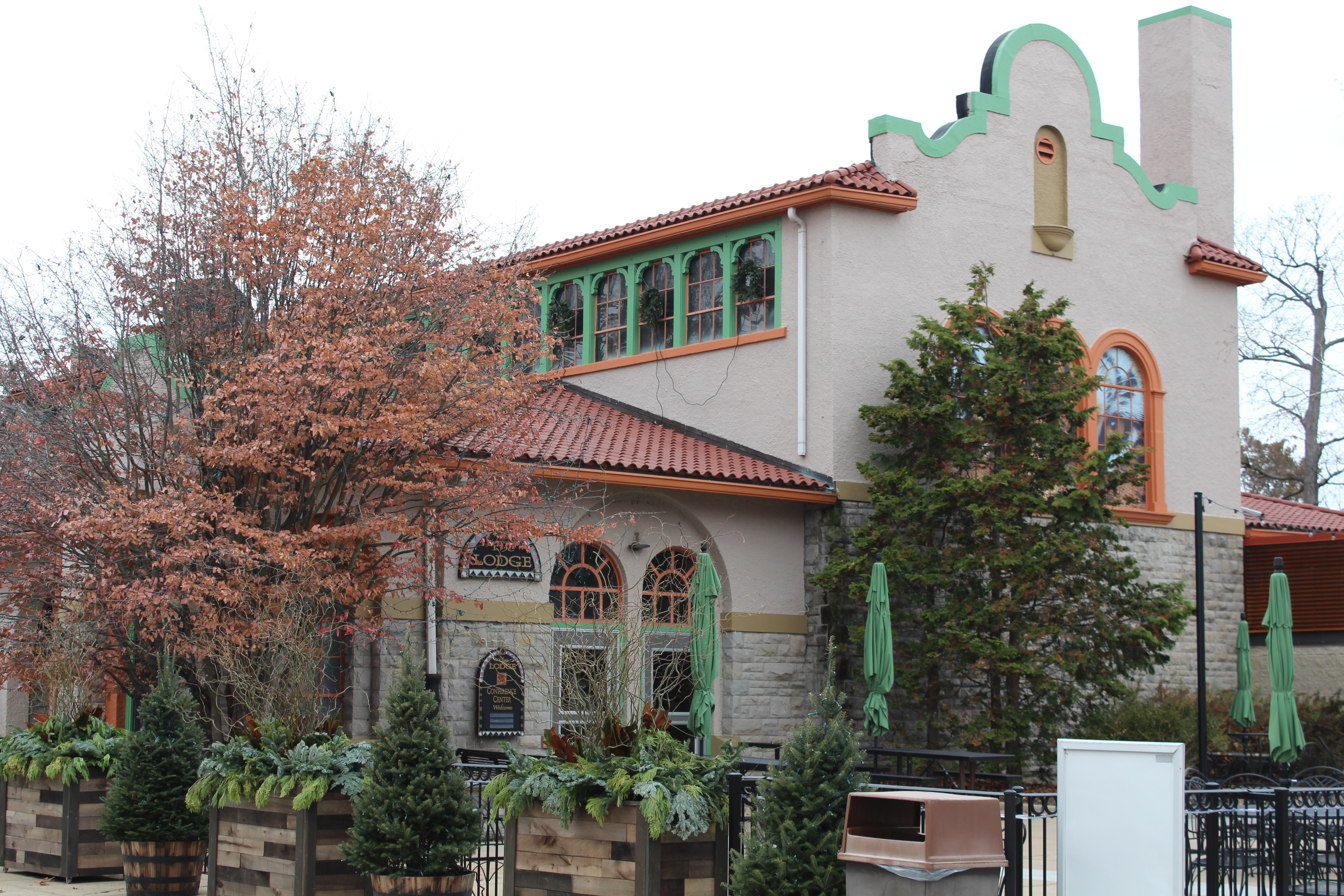
The Elephant House - now used as event space

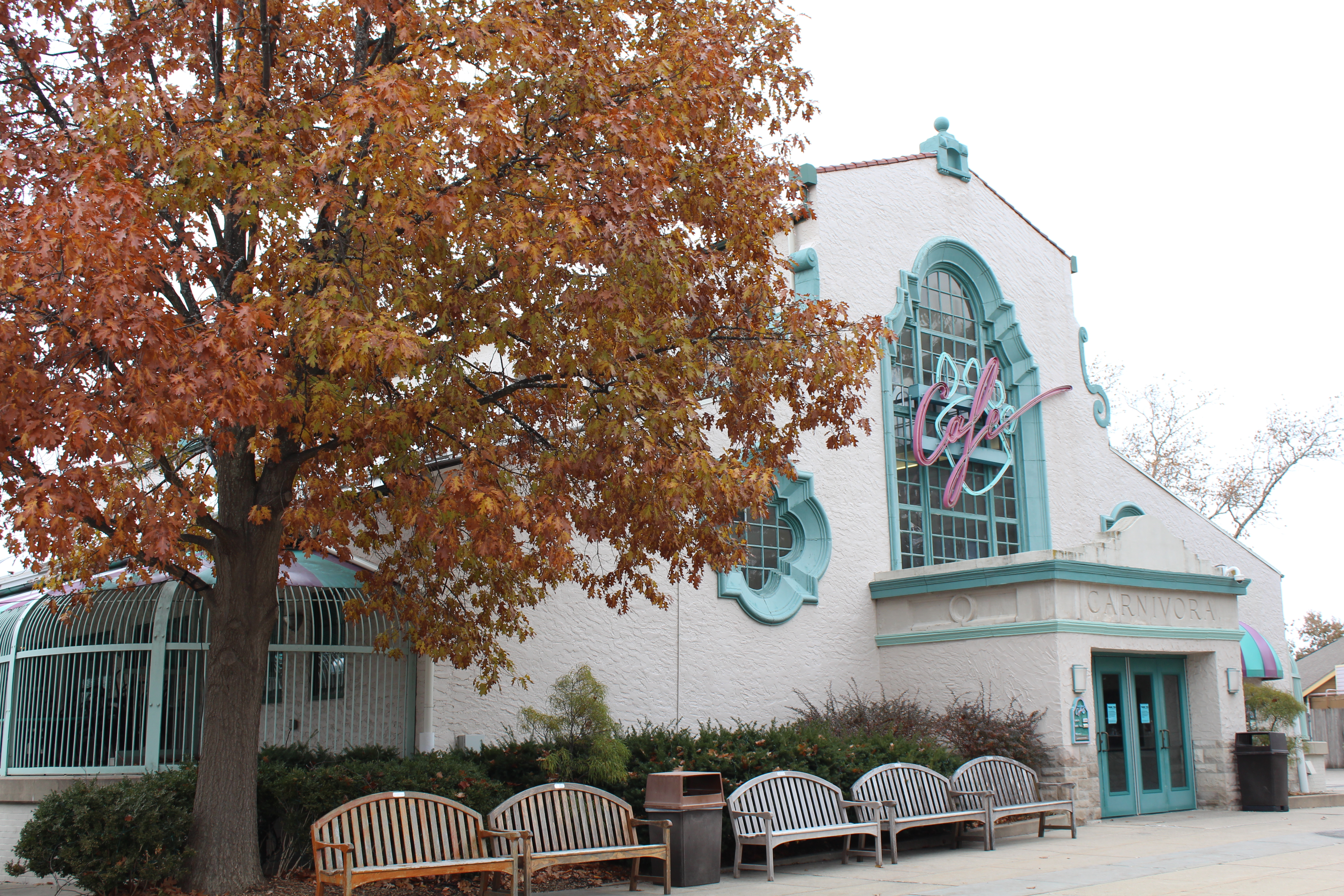
The Original Carnivora House - now used as the Carnivore Cafe

The architectural style used in the first strategic plan for the zoo was inspired by the Spanish architecture of the city's namesake, Toledo, Spain. By 1924, they had completed the first building of their master plan, the Elephant House. To maintain funding for the zoo, Jones had brokered a deal with the City of Toledo so that it could be managed similarly to the Bronx Zoo. The Toledo Zoo became a public/private venture in 1926, allowing financial support from the city while leaving operations in the hands of the TZS. In 1928, they completed their second building, the Herbivora (Giraffe House). On Christmas Day 1927, the Carnivora Building was opened to the public, after groundbreaking was done by Kermit Roosevelt. In 1929, the Toledo Zoo completed its last building before the WPA Era, the Primate House.

=== 1930–1940: The WPA era ===
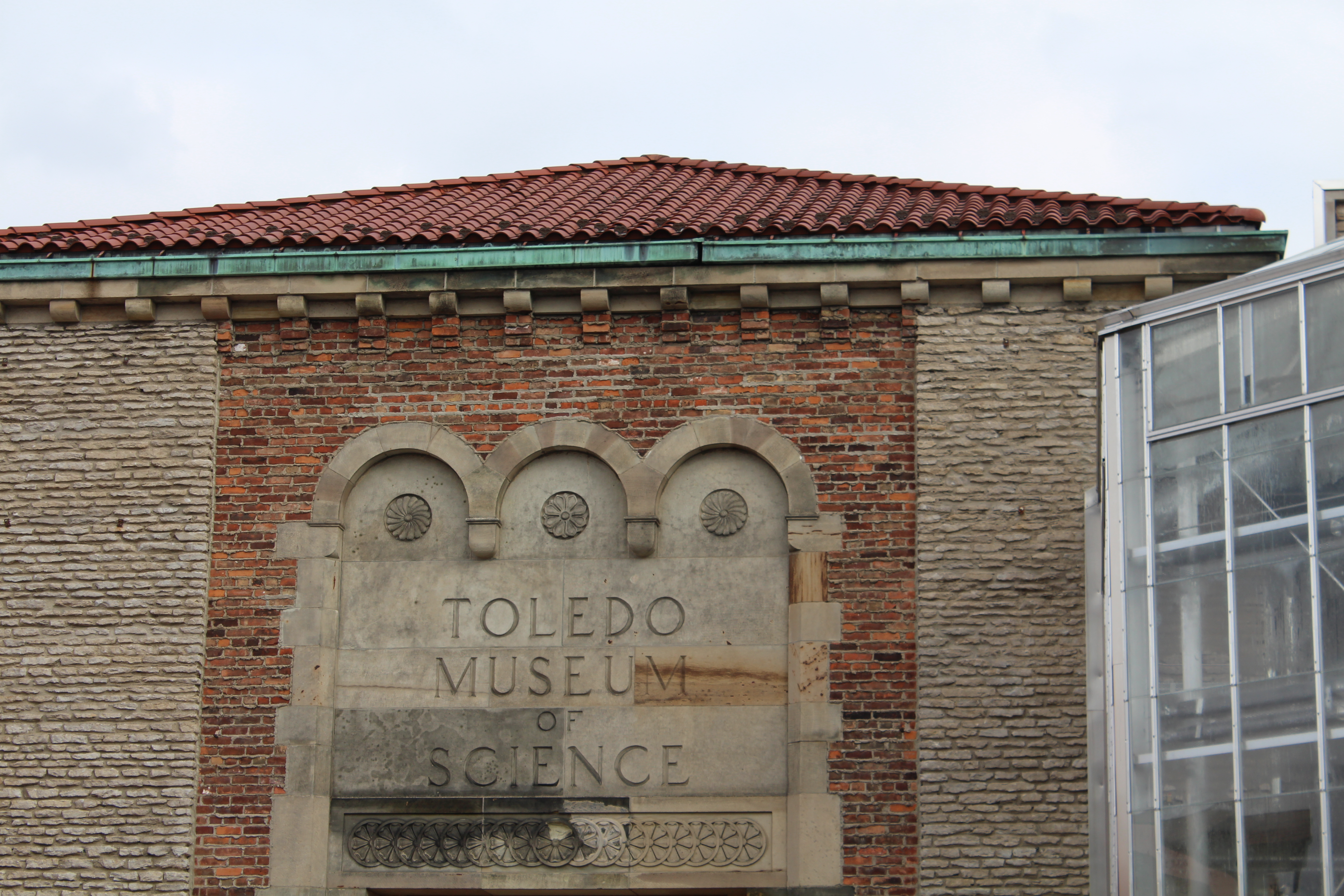
The original Museum of Science prior to renovations

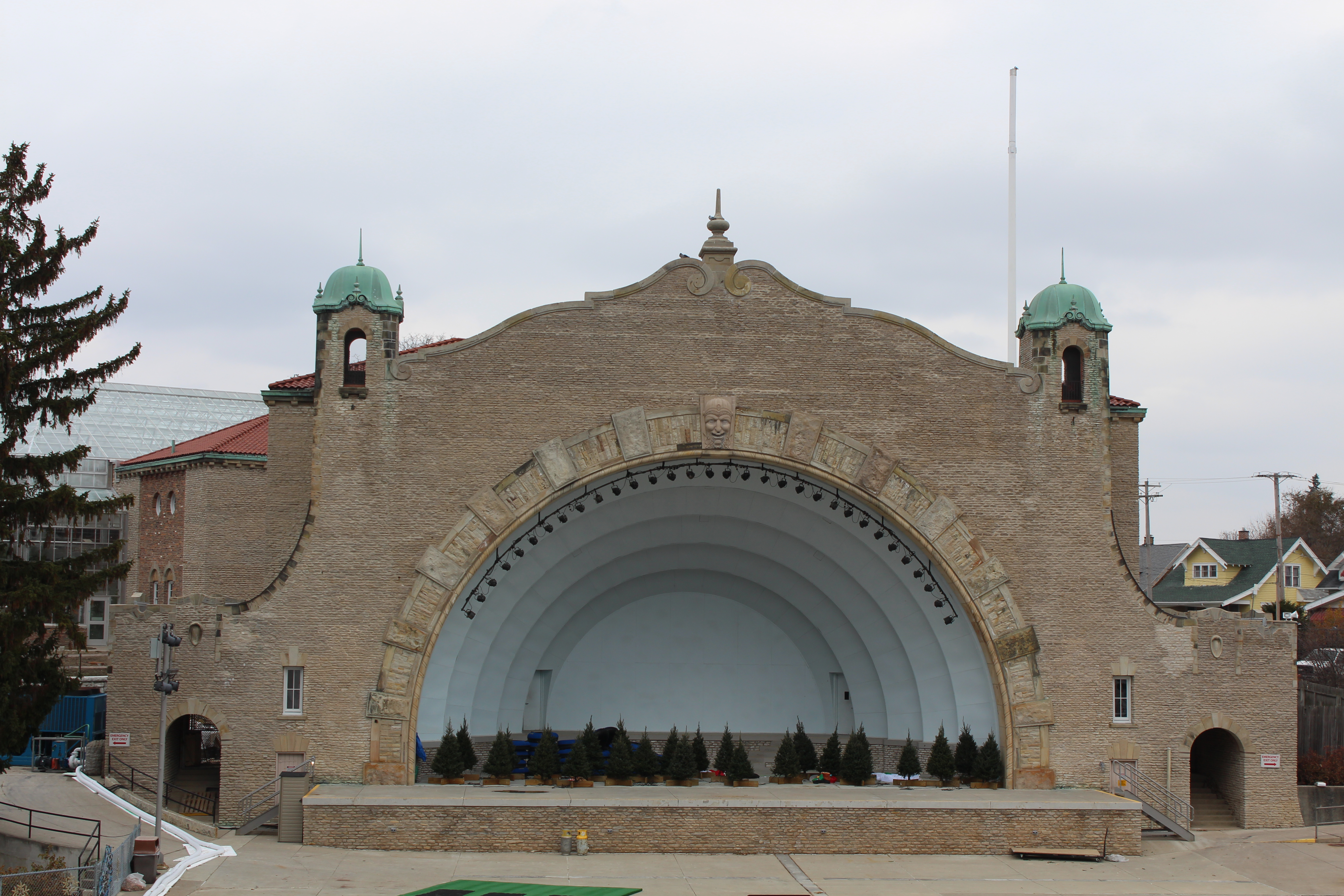
The Toledo Zoo Amphitheater

During the Great Depression, the Toledo Zoo was able to take advantage of government programs to provide labor. With the remainder of their master plan nearing completion, Skeldon, Jones, and Colonel John S. Shelter brokered a deal with the federal government to use depression-era relief efforts to create jobs. In 1934, construction began on the first Works Progress Administration (WPA) building in the zoo, the Reptile House. Federal funding would only cover labor costs, so the Toledo Zoo had to salvage parts from unused structures. Skeldon created multiple agreements that allowed the Toledo Zoo the right to salvage as long as they cleared the land. In the end, the Toledo Zoo was able to salvage all the stonework, lumber, and radiators needed to begin construction of the Reptilia (Reptile House). The Reptile House was officially opened in September 1934, to house over 485 reptiles and amphibians. The same day, groundbreaking took place for the next two relief effort buildings, the Museum of Science and the attached Amphitheater. In July 1936, the outdoor Amphitheater was completed, followed closely behind by the indoor theater in October 1936, and the Museum of Science in May 1938. The Aves (Aviary) started construction in 1935 and was officially opened to the public in May 1937. Like other WPA buildings, it was also built from salvaged material but was the first building in the nation to use glass blocks for walls. The final WPA project to open was the Aquarium. It was the first public aquarium in the state of Ohio, the largest freshwater aquarium in the world, and the 30,000th completed WPA project in the state. All of these structures remain in use at the Toledo Zoo & Aquarium today, and it may be the largest collection of these Depression Era relief buildings still in place today. Additional WPA projects at the zoo included new entrances, the Anthony Wayne Subway, and a wall dividing the Amphitheater from the zoo.

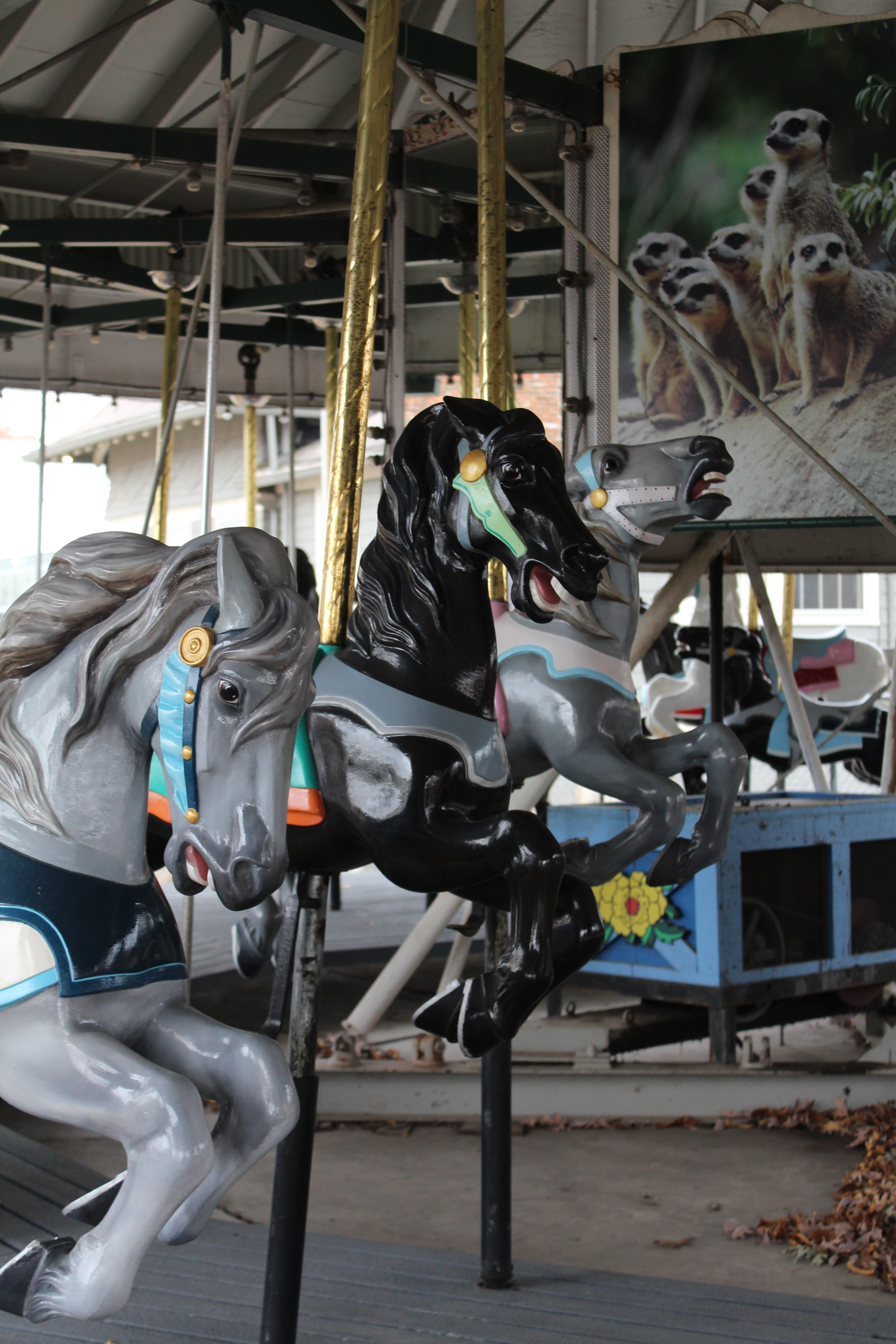
Carousel horses on the original zoo carousel

=== 1940–1980: Post-war era ===
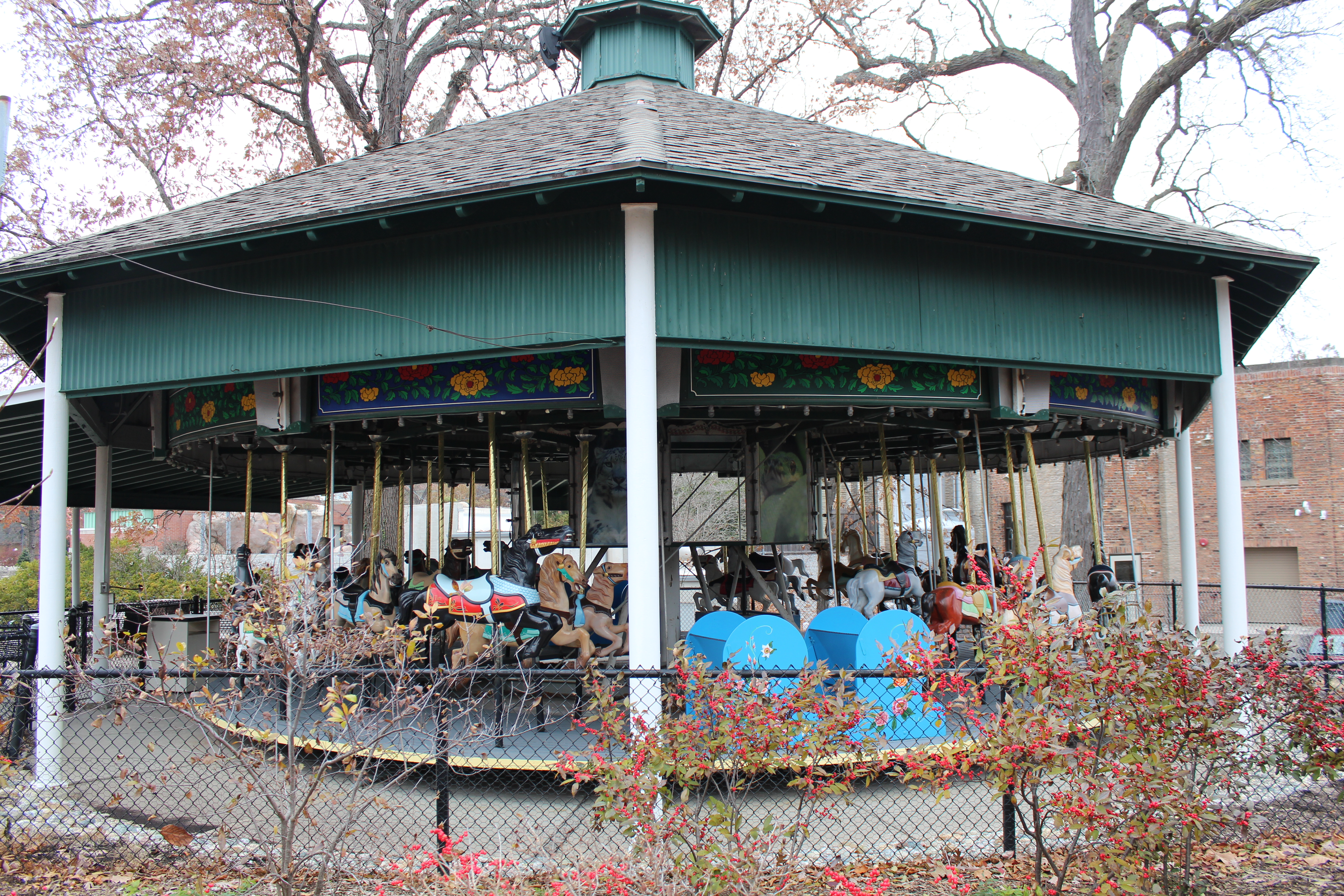
Original Carousel located on the South Campus

At the end of the WPA era, with the passing of Percy Jones and Frank Skeldon in the 1940s, the Toledo Zoo was ushered into a new post-war era. In 1946, the Toledo Zoo began to invest in amusement with a ridable miniature railway. In honor of the 50th anniversary in 1949–1950, the Toledo Zoo launched its current publication, Safari Magazine. In 1953, the Toledo Zoo housed 3,537 animals. By the end of the 1950s, the Toledo Zoo had created new pens, a gibbon run, and new exhibits along the northern edge of the zoo. A highlight was the indoor trout run, thought to be the only one in America, opened in 1959. In 1963, they continued to expand with the development of interconnecting water pools for waterfowl and a pond for flamingos. The 1960s also sent the Toledo Zoo on safari to South America to help celebrate the 125th anniversary of the Toledo Blade. It was during that safari that the staff of the Toledo Zoo were able to capture 75 new species for display.

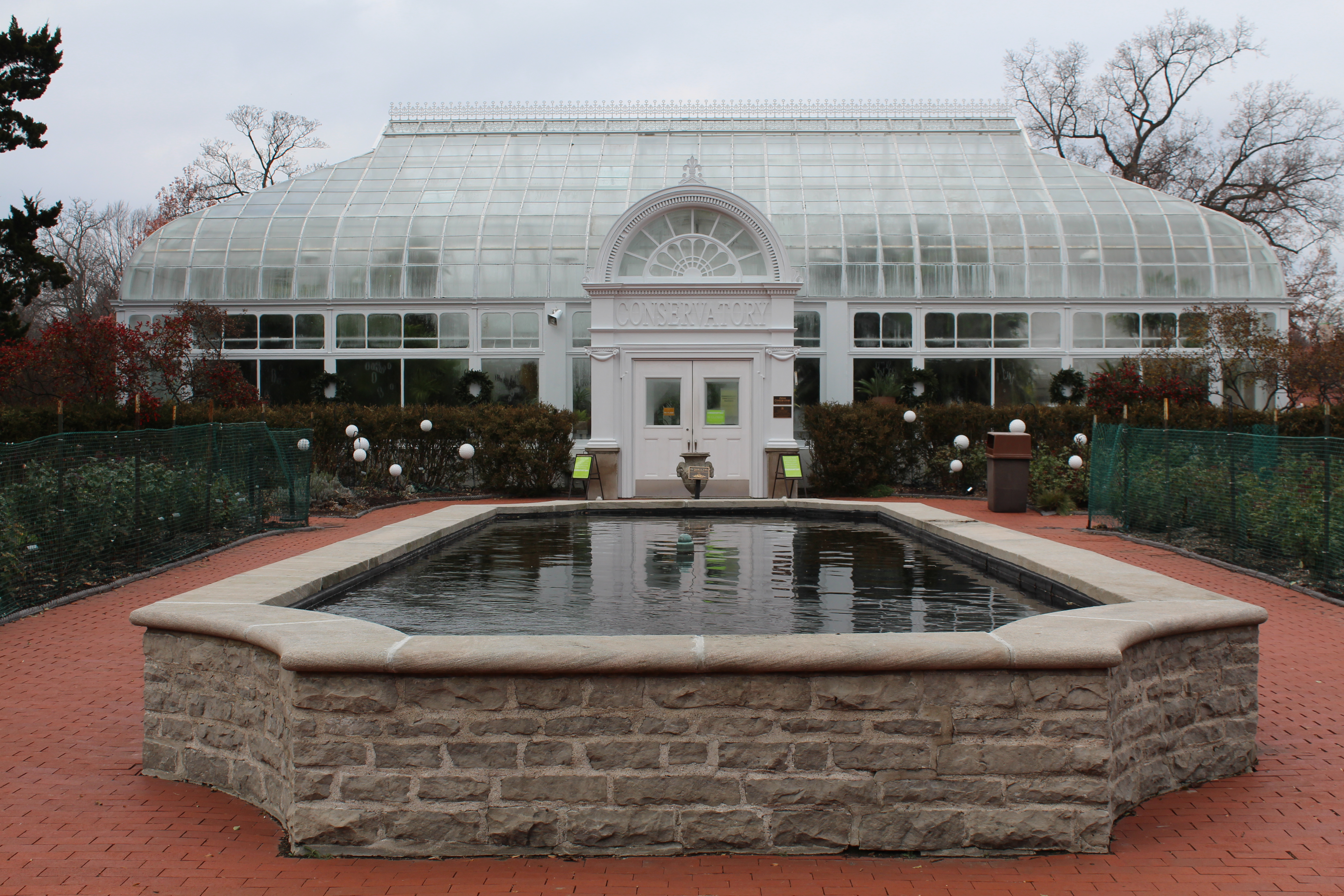
The Conservatory/Greenhouse

=== 1980–2000: Renaissance ===
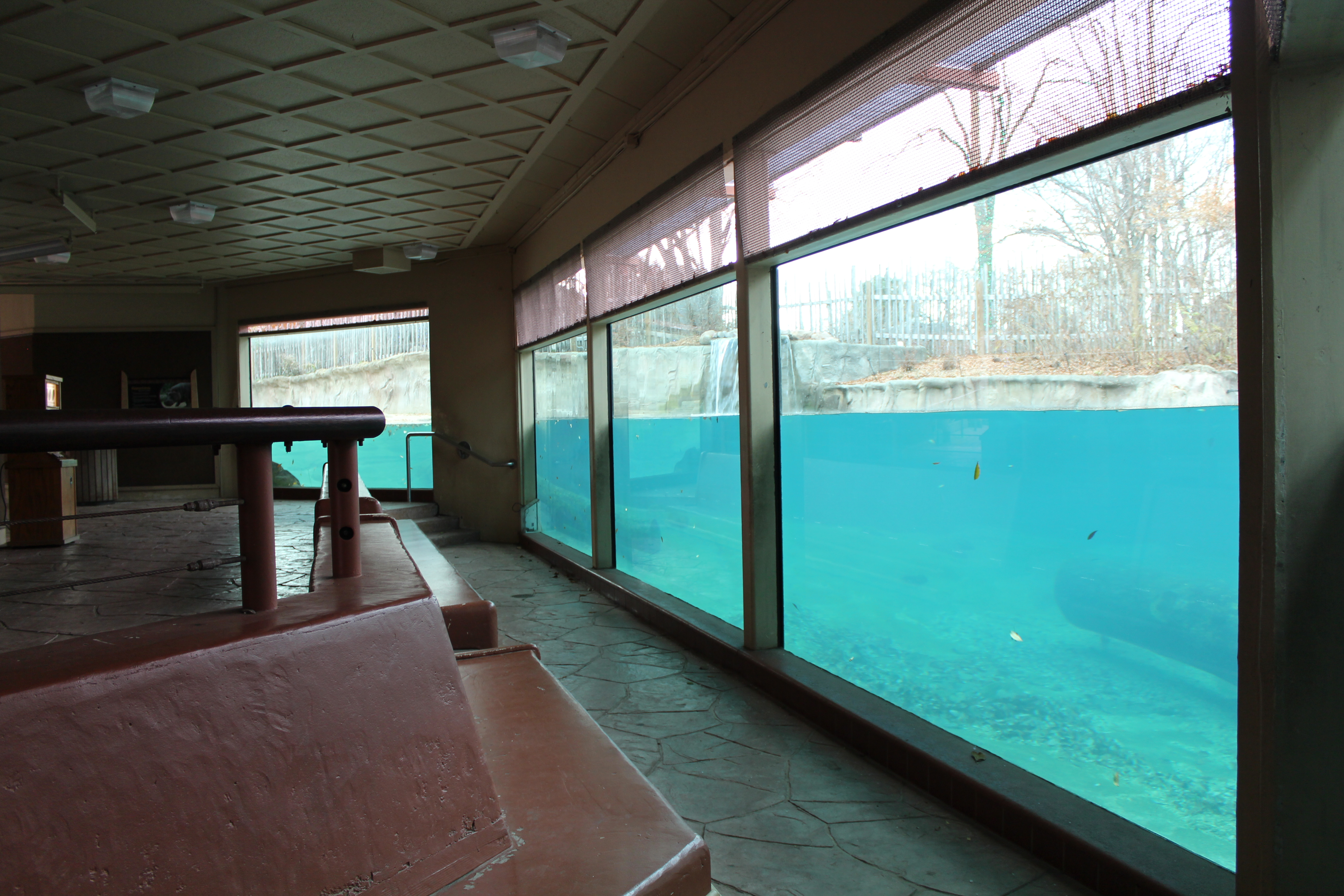
The Hippoquarium at the Toledo Zoo

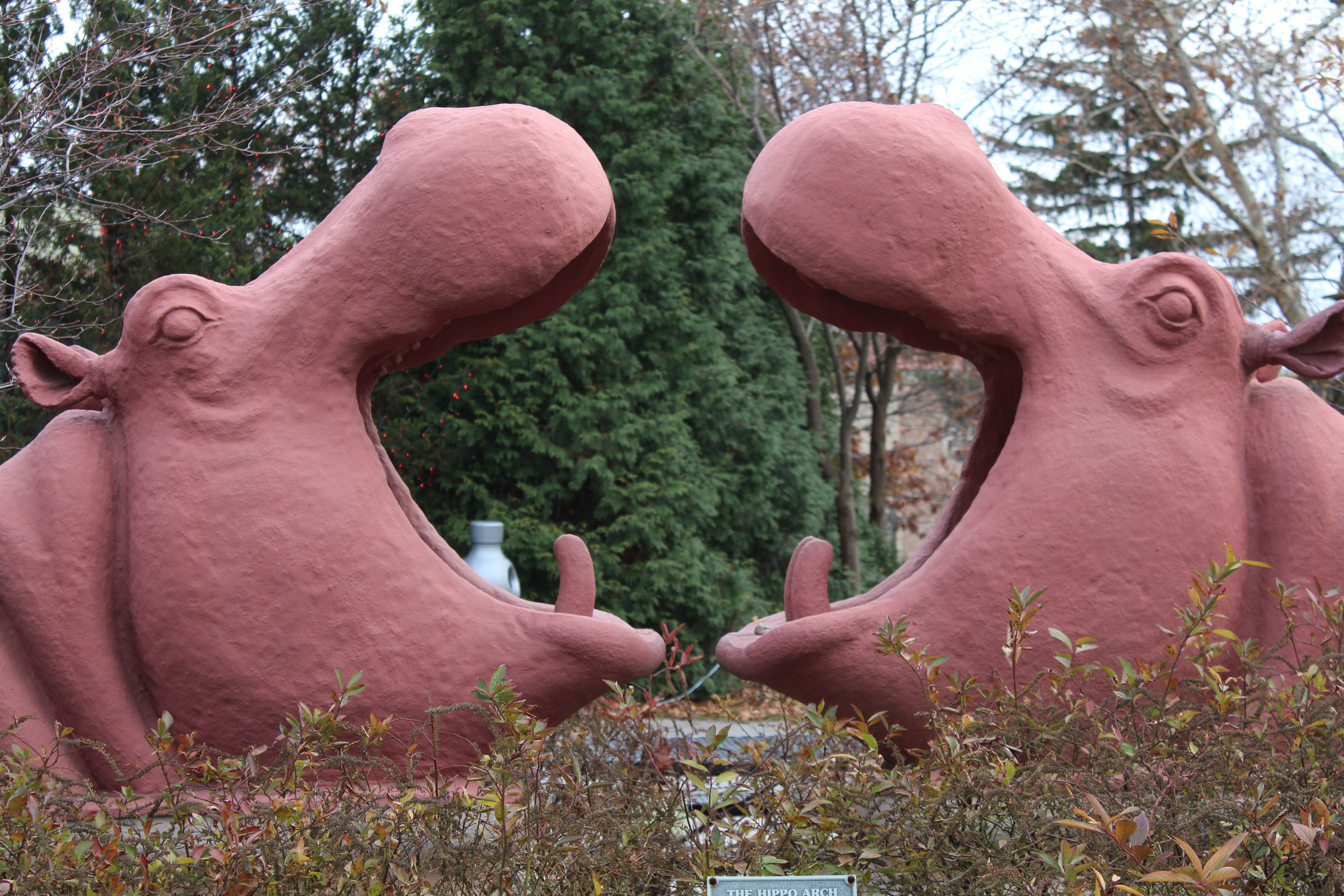
The famed hippos from the original entrance of the African Savanna exhibit

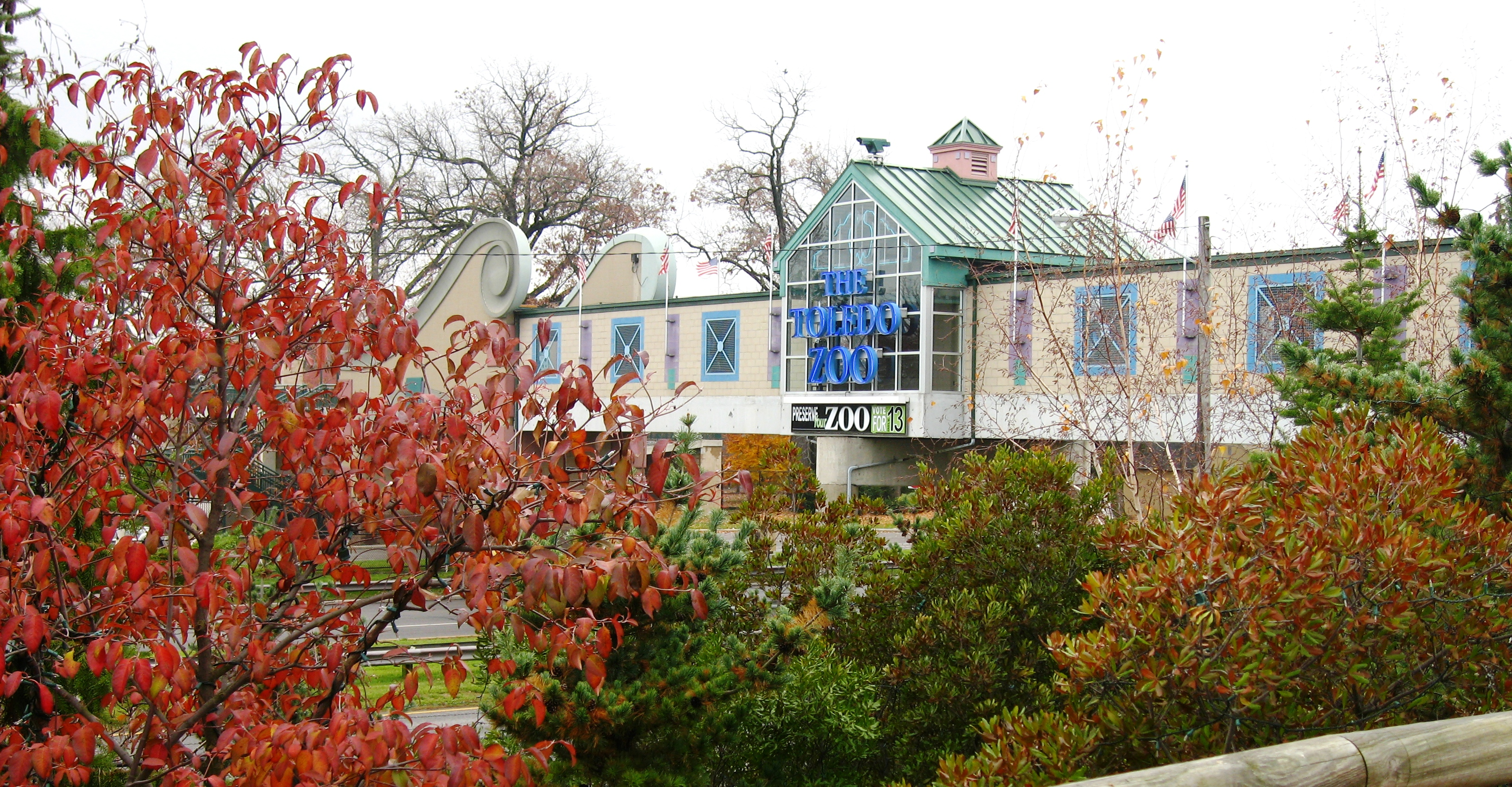
Pedestrian bridge at the Toledo Zoo

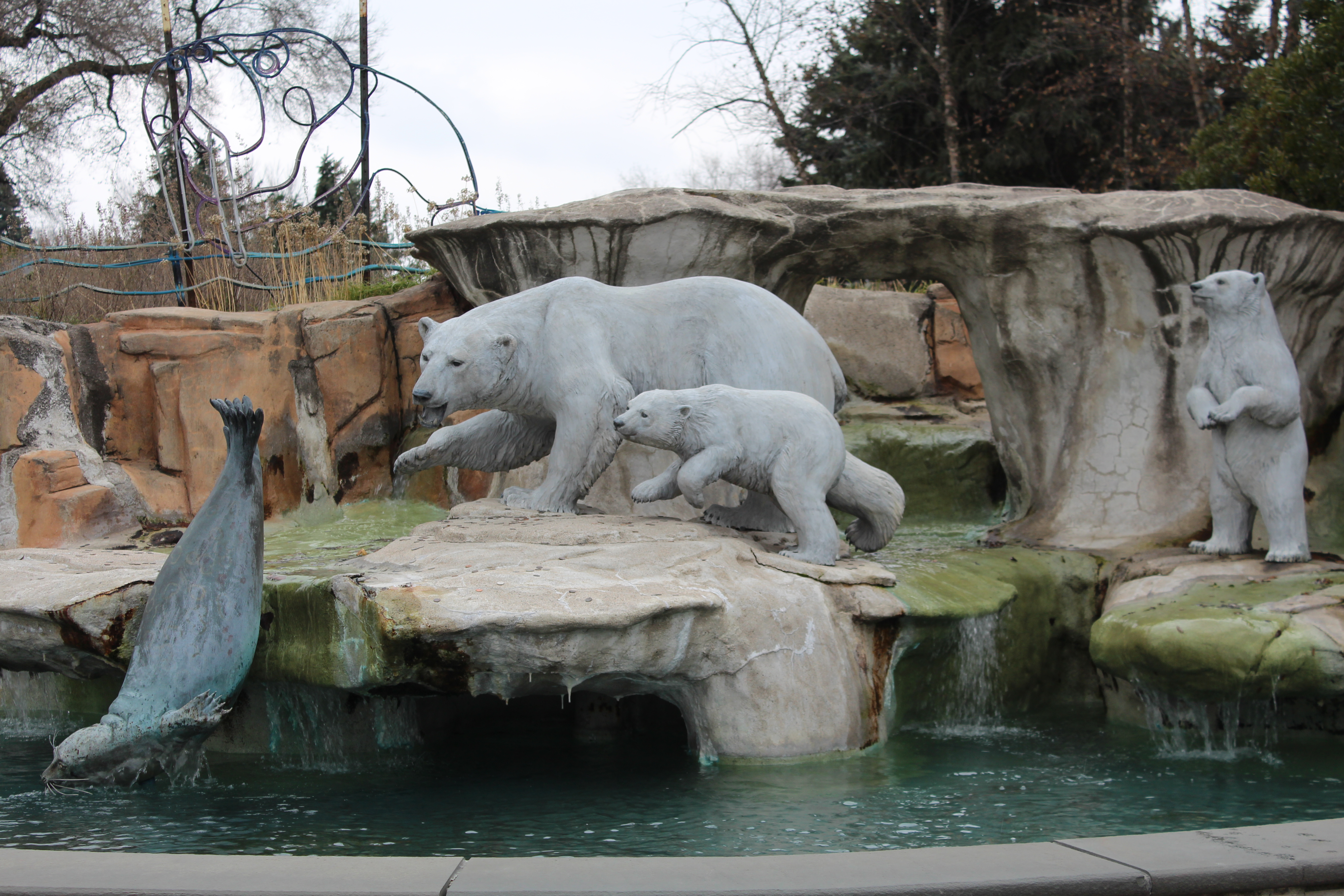
Entrance to Arctic Encounter

At the beginning of the 1980s the Toledo Zoo faced a potential closure. With an agreement created by Jones, the zoo was financially tied to a city in a financial crisis. Massive layoffs ensued and a staff of 70 was reduced to 24. With the passage of a zoo levy in November 1980, they were still left in the face of probable closure. The levy was for capital improvements only, so the money could not be used on animal care, staff members, or other items needed to run the zoo. As a result, the Museum of Science and the conservatory were closed. To add to the problems, Skeldon was set to retire at the end of the year, and they had not yet found a replacement director. In January 1981, William "Bill" Dennler accepted the position and became the director of the Toledo Zoo. In the early 80s, the WPA buildings were carefully restored, and in 1983 a children's zoo was opened. The Aquarium had two major incidents occur during the 1980s. Because of the success of the Hippoquarium exhibit and a hippo birth caught on tape, the Toledo Zoo was allowed to exhibit two giant pandas on loan from the People's Republic of China. The panda pair arrived in May 1988 and were exhibited through October 1988. The loan was challenged by the World Wildlife Fund, as well as the American Zoo and Aquarium Association, through a lawsuit against the U.S. Fish and Wildlife service. Additional lawsuits followed, but the loan of the pandas remained intact and the lawsuits were settled. This outcry of debate dissolved the relationship with the People's Republic of China, and it was not until 1998 that they allowed another loan of pandas to the US, via the San Diego Zoo.

=== 2000–current ===
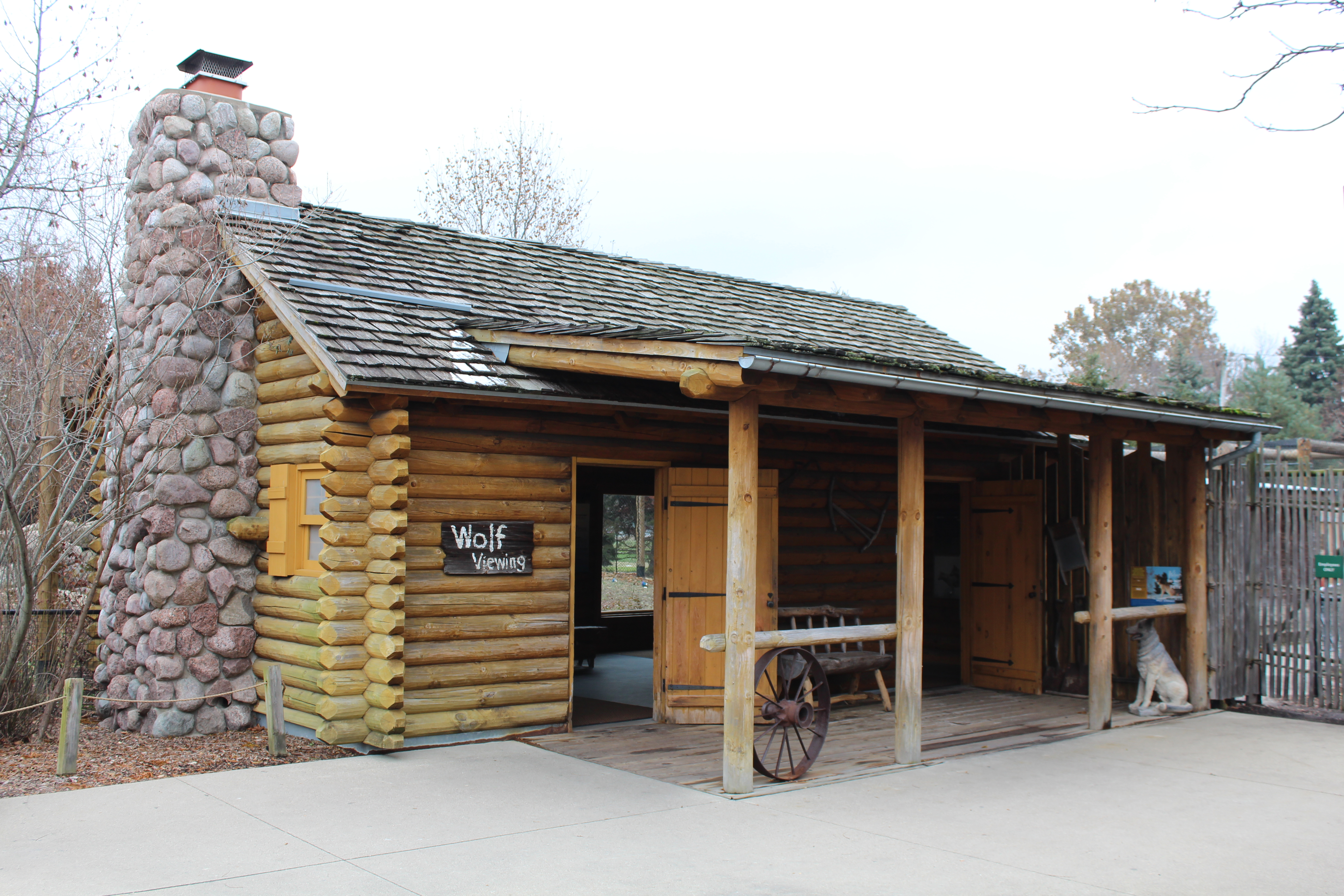
Wolf viewing area at the Toledo Zoo

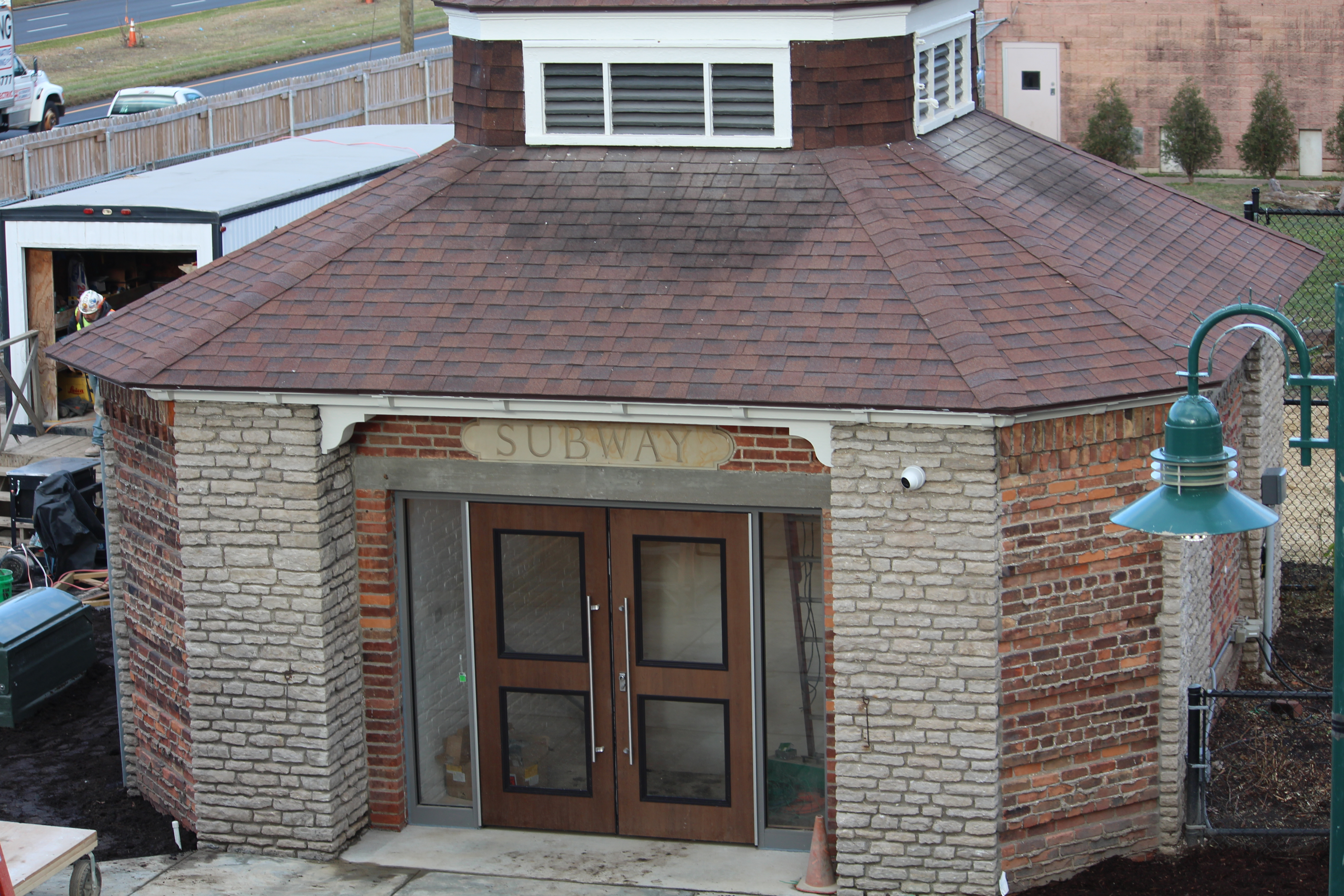
Subway renovations for 2018 re-opening

After celebrating the centennial anniversary of the Toledo Zoo, the zoo faced controversy after the death of a female sloth bear by dehydration in 2000. After investigation, the zoo was fined by the FDA and was required to put into effect an animal reporting system to better track any issues on animal concerns. The Toledo Zoo opened the Africa! exhibit in 2001 and a wolf exhibit expected to be finished the following year. By 2003, the Toledo Zoo breeding programs took off, with the births of sloth bears, elephants, tigers, and other animals. The successful birth of the African elephant was historic as there had only been 12 births in the US since 1995. The projects at the zoo have continued with the redesigning of the Museum of Science from 2017 to 2019. Upon breaking ground, ProMedica donated $3.5 million to the project. In 2018, the Toledo Zoo & Aquarium reopened its underground subway crossing during the Lights Before Christmas.

== Exhibits ==
=== Africa ===
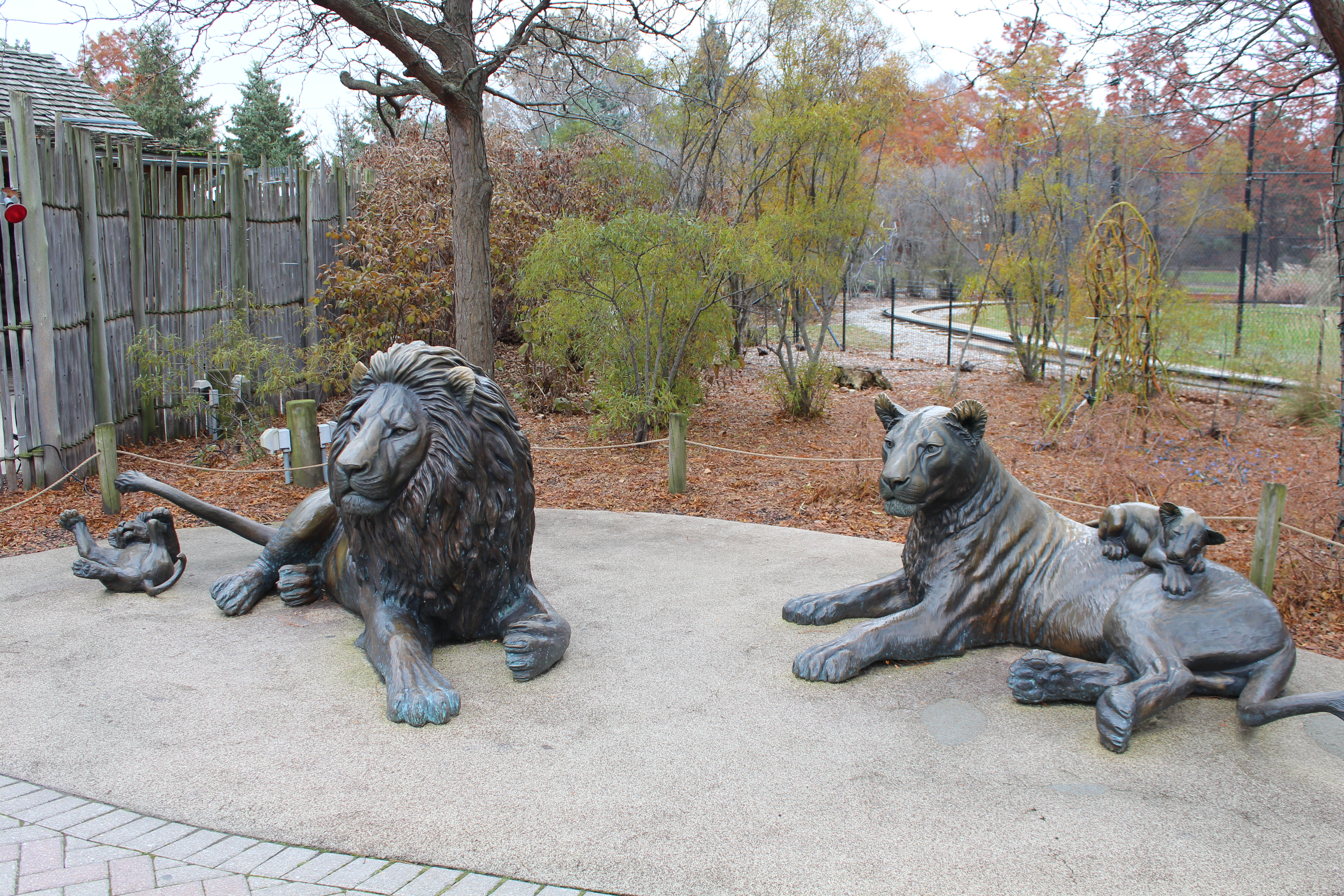
Statues welcoming visitors to Africa

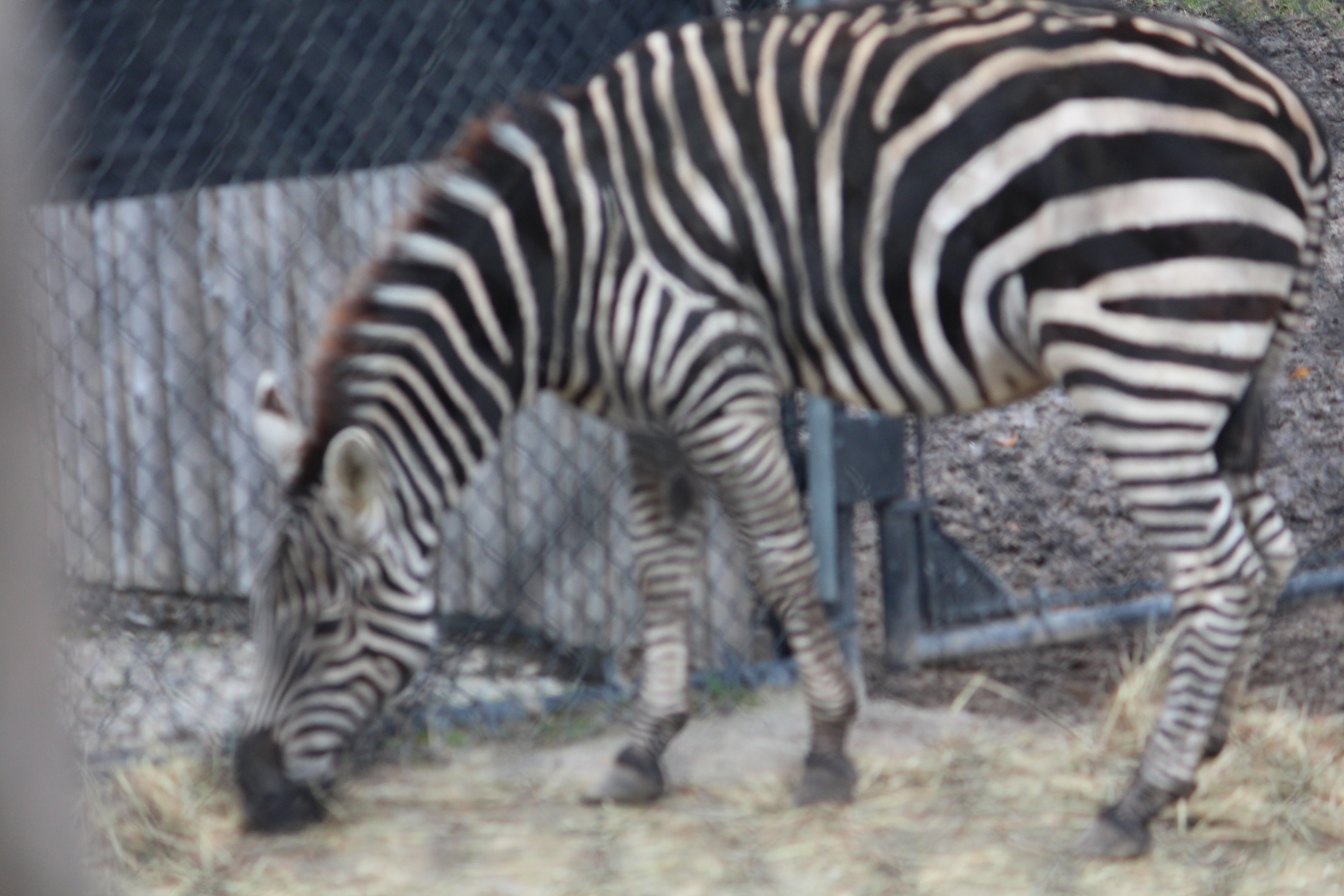
A zebra in the Africa! exhibit

Africa opened on May 1, 2004, and is 12 acres (4.9 ha) large. The main exhibit, the African plains, is 5 acres (2.0 ha) in size. It has artificial termite mounds for the free-roaming African animals, such as the Grant's zebra, greater kudu, helmeted guineafowl, Dama gazelles, Masai giraffe, white-backed vulture, ostrich, watusi cattle, warthogs, and blue wildebeest. There is also a 0.6-acre (2,400 m^{2}) section for cheetahs. The exhibit has an observation deck. The exhibit houses the Safari Railway, which circles Africa! The exhibit also has an African animal carousel. Africa! was built on the site of the original gravel parking lot that existed before the bridge was built. In March 2010, a male baby giraffe named Enzi was born. Enzi's father, Mowgli, is another famous giraffe at the zoo. In 2016, the Houston Zoo needed the African wild dogs for a breeding recommendation so the zoo replaced them with three young, male cheetahs from the Columbus Zoo. In 2017, two female Masai giraffes were born at the zoo named Kipenzi and Binti. In 2017, the Malawi event center was added in between the indoor Giraffe Exhibit and the children's carousel. It is a rentable space seating 900+ people. It also contains a 14,000 US gallon (52,996 L) aquarium housing native African fish, mostly cichlids.

=== Aquarium ===
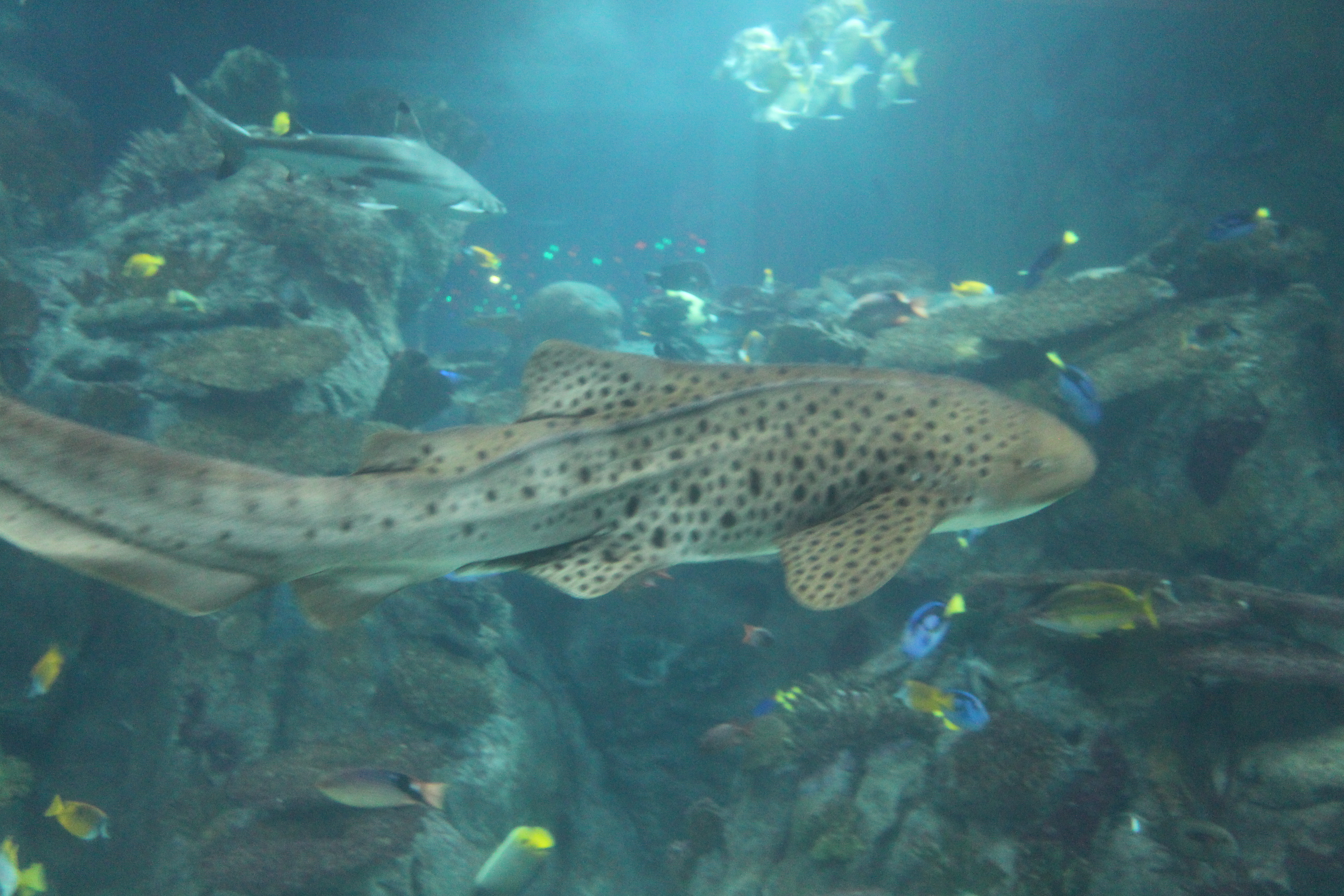
A zebra shark in the Aquarium

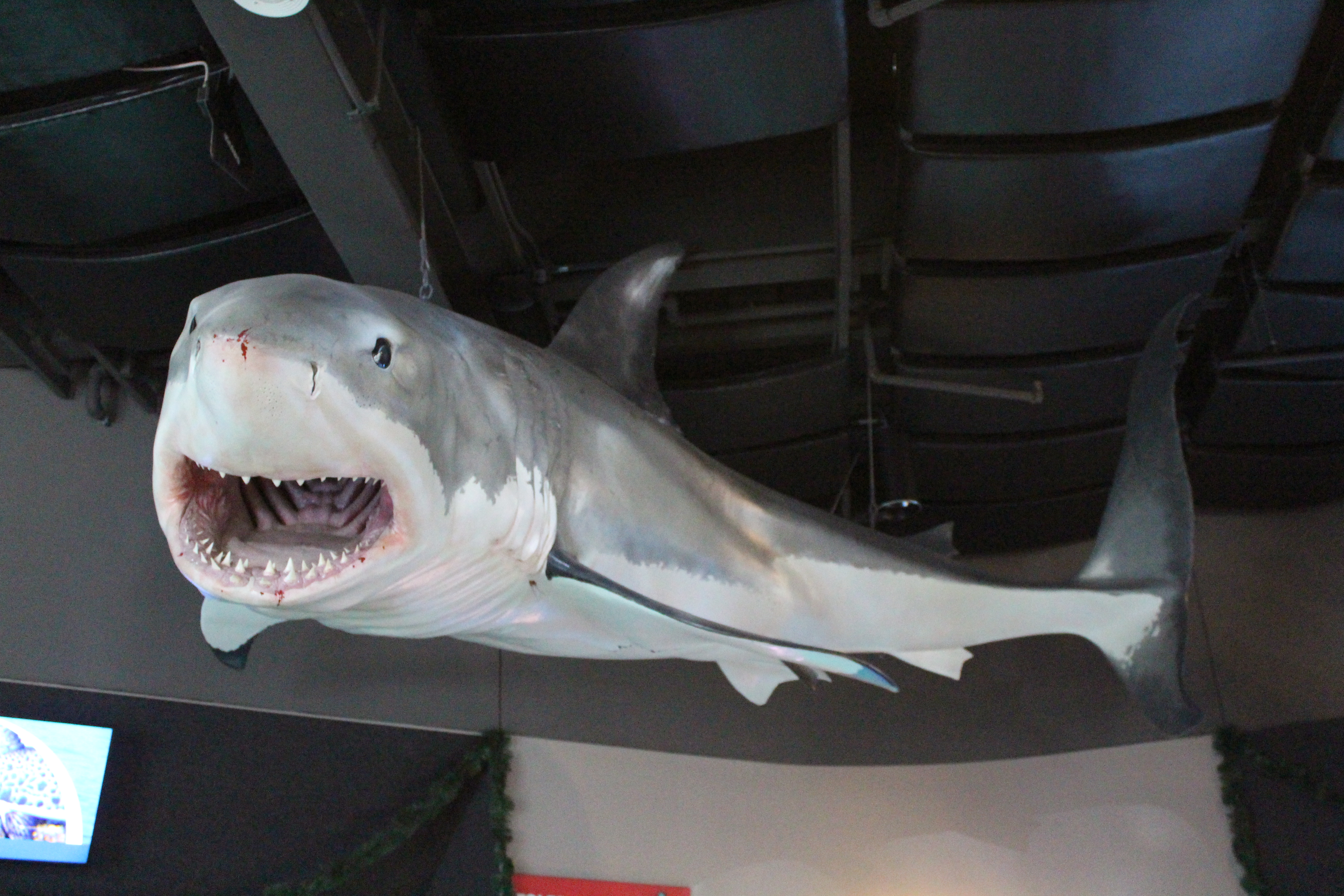
A great white shark model hanging from the Aquarium ceiling

The Toledo Zoo & Aquarium has one of the most diverse collections of any zoo-aquarium in the United States. The aquarium closed in October 2012 for renovations and re-opened in March 2015. The updated aquarium contains 3000+ aquatic animals in 178,000 US gal (670,000 L) of water, including the largest tank with 90,000 US gal (340,000 L). The total water volume is nearly four times as much as the previous aquarium. Two new additions are a large touch tank containing various stingrays and small sharks and a smaller touch tank housing invertebrates, such as multiple species of starfish, a wide variety of hermit crabs, horseshoe crabs, and pencil sea urchins. The renovations took two and half years and preserved the exterior of the Works Progress Administration era structure. This area also includes goldfish, zebra sharks, an alligator snapping turtle, blacktip reef sharks, isopods, walleye, clownfish, electric eels, bichir, southern stingrays, channel catfish, epaulette sharks, cownose rays, a giant Pacific octopus, horn sharks, neon tetras, Australian lungfish, flashlight fish, arowanas, Japanese spider crabs, African lungfish, a shoal of red-bellied piranhas, gar, Atlantic stingrays, arapaima, a giant gourami, yellow-spotted rays, common carp, South American lungfish, discus, seahorses, a wolf eel, as well as jellyfish, leopard sharks, garden eels, and a green turtle named Tink.

=== Arctic Encounter ===
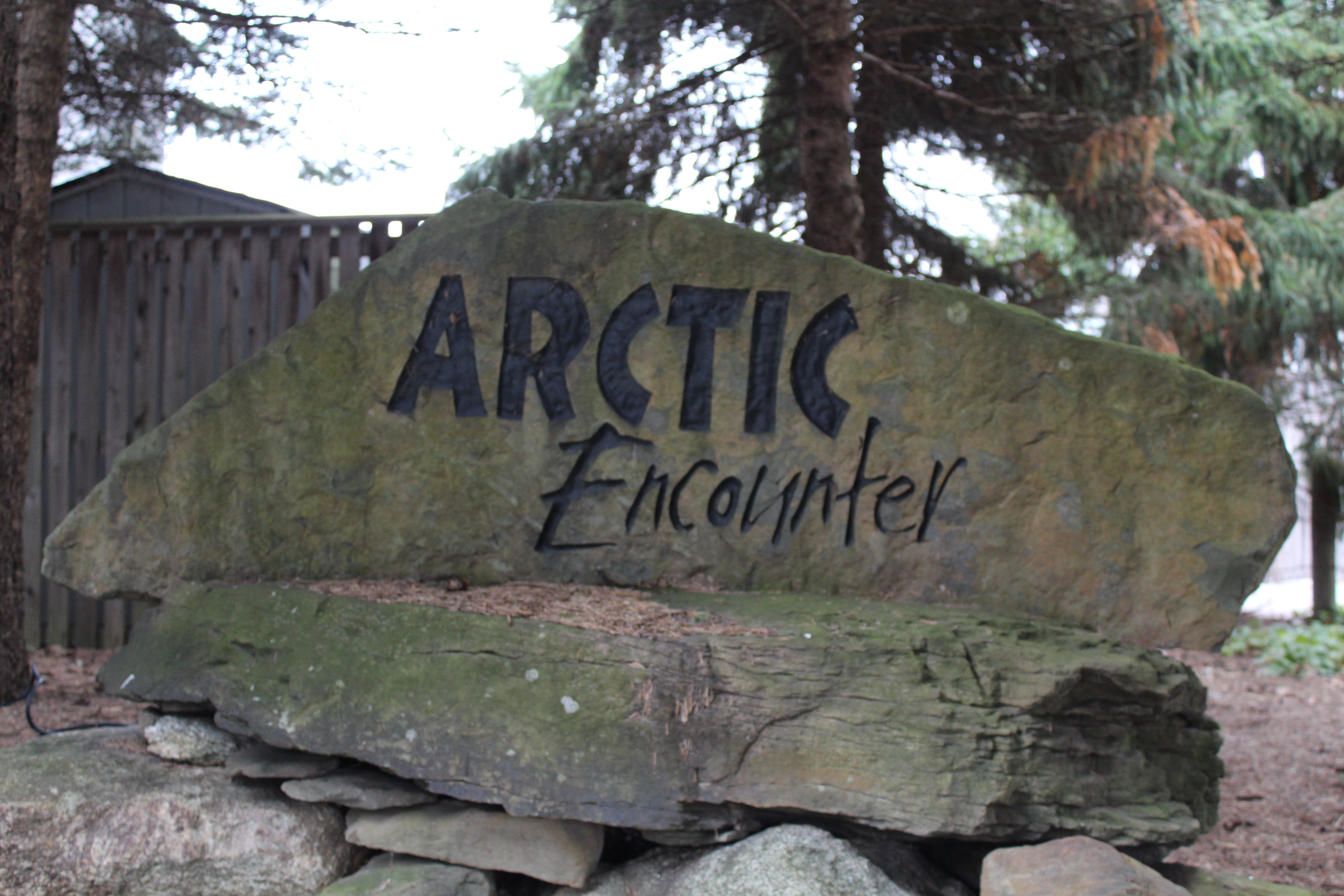

The Arctic Encounter includes grey wolves, gray and harbor seals, California sea lions, and polar bears. Two waterfalls and seven saltwater streams are featured in this exhibit.

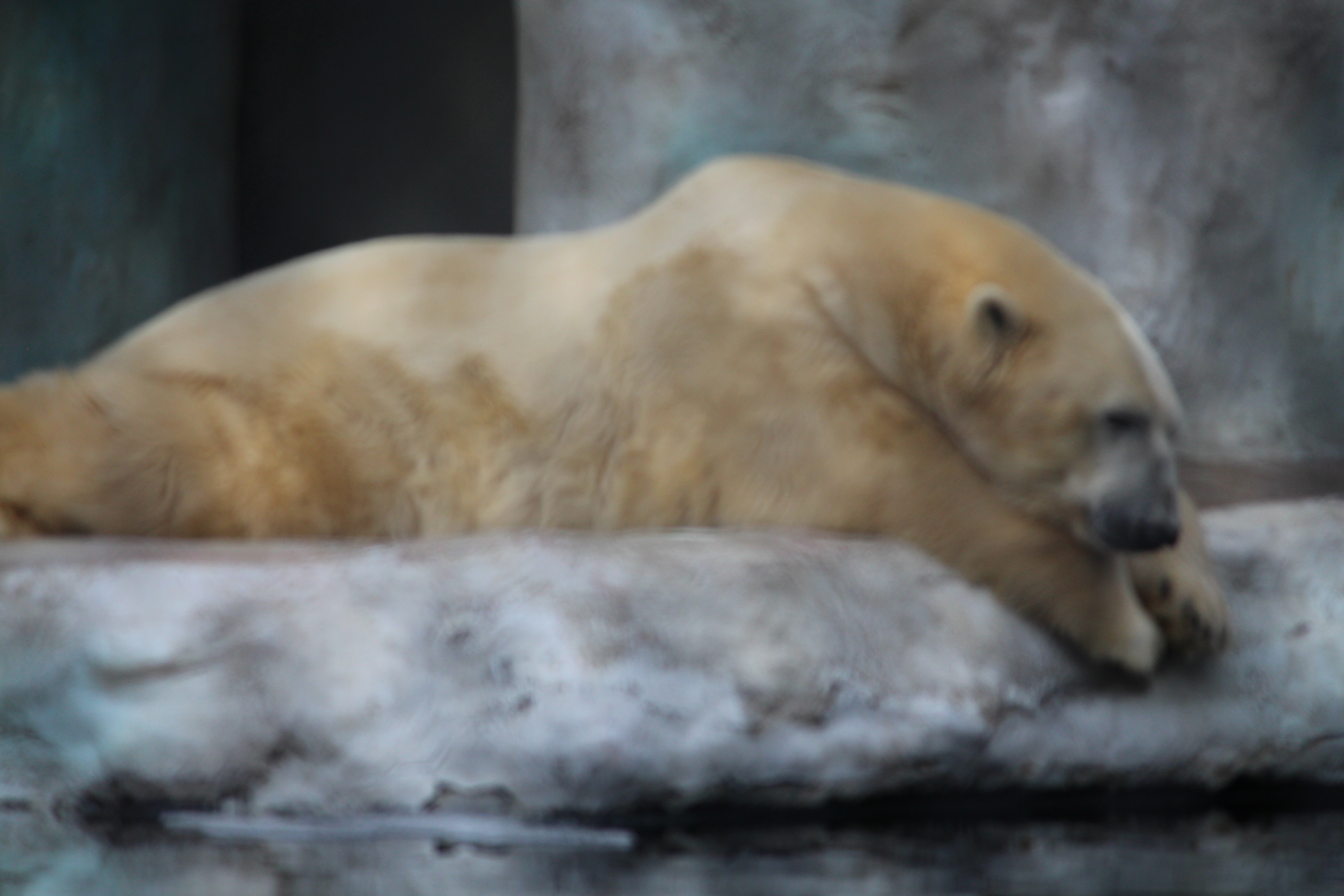

The seals have 4,000 square feet (370 m^{2}) of land and 3,000 square feet (280 m^{2}) of salt water. The polar bear exhibit includes 6,000 square feet (560 m^{2}) of land and 1,600 square feet (150 m^{2}) of water. There is a freshwater stream filled with fish during regular times. A "kids' cave" shows children and adults what it is like to be a polar bear. On January 12, 2015, three more juvenile wolves were added to the zoo after the passing of two of the female wolves. The new male wolves are named Loki, Lobo, and Tundra. On December 1, 2022, it was announced that two cubs were born at the facility for the first time since 2012.

=== Aviary ===
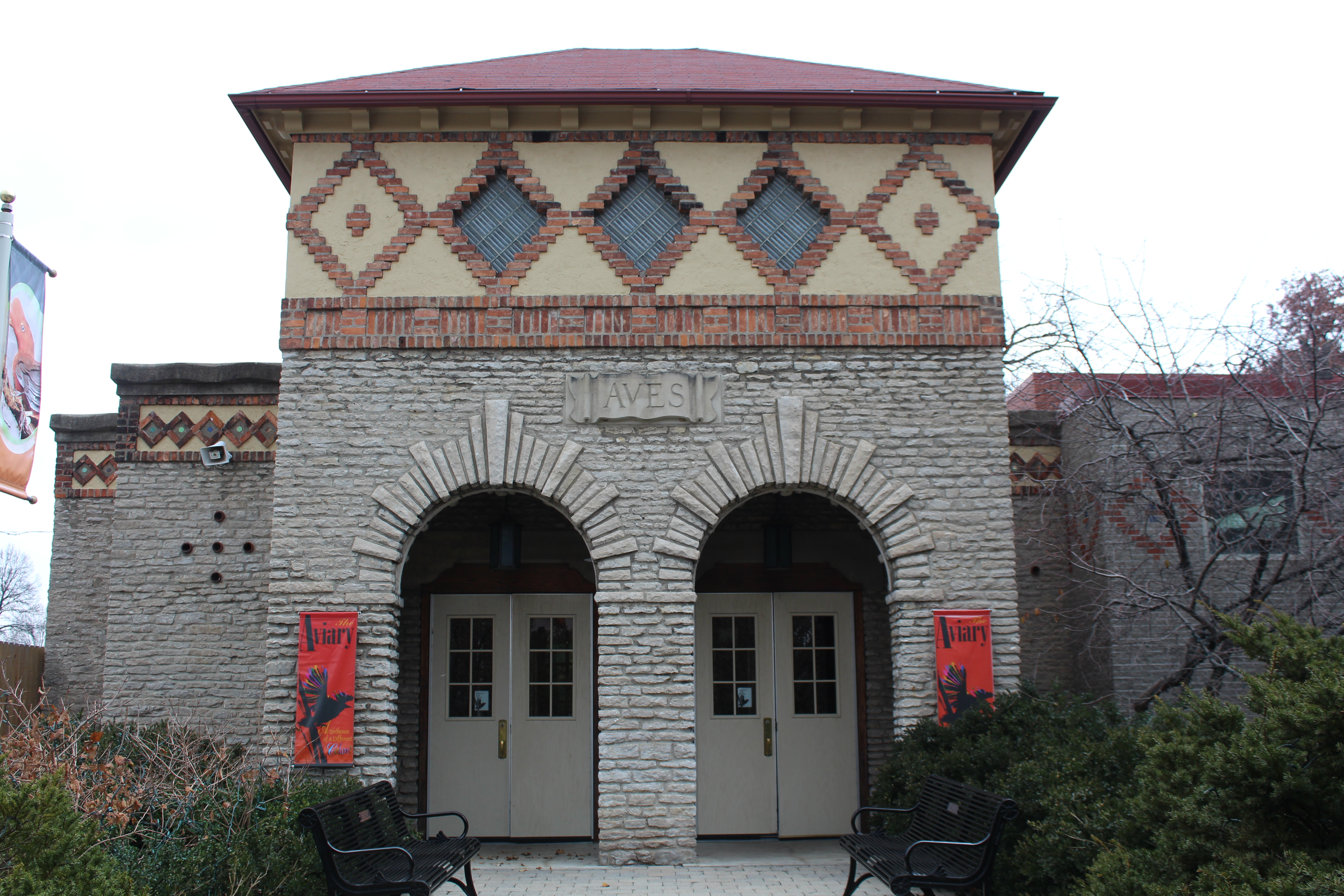

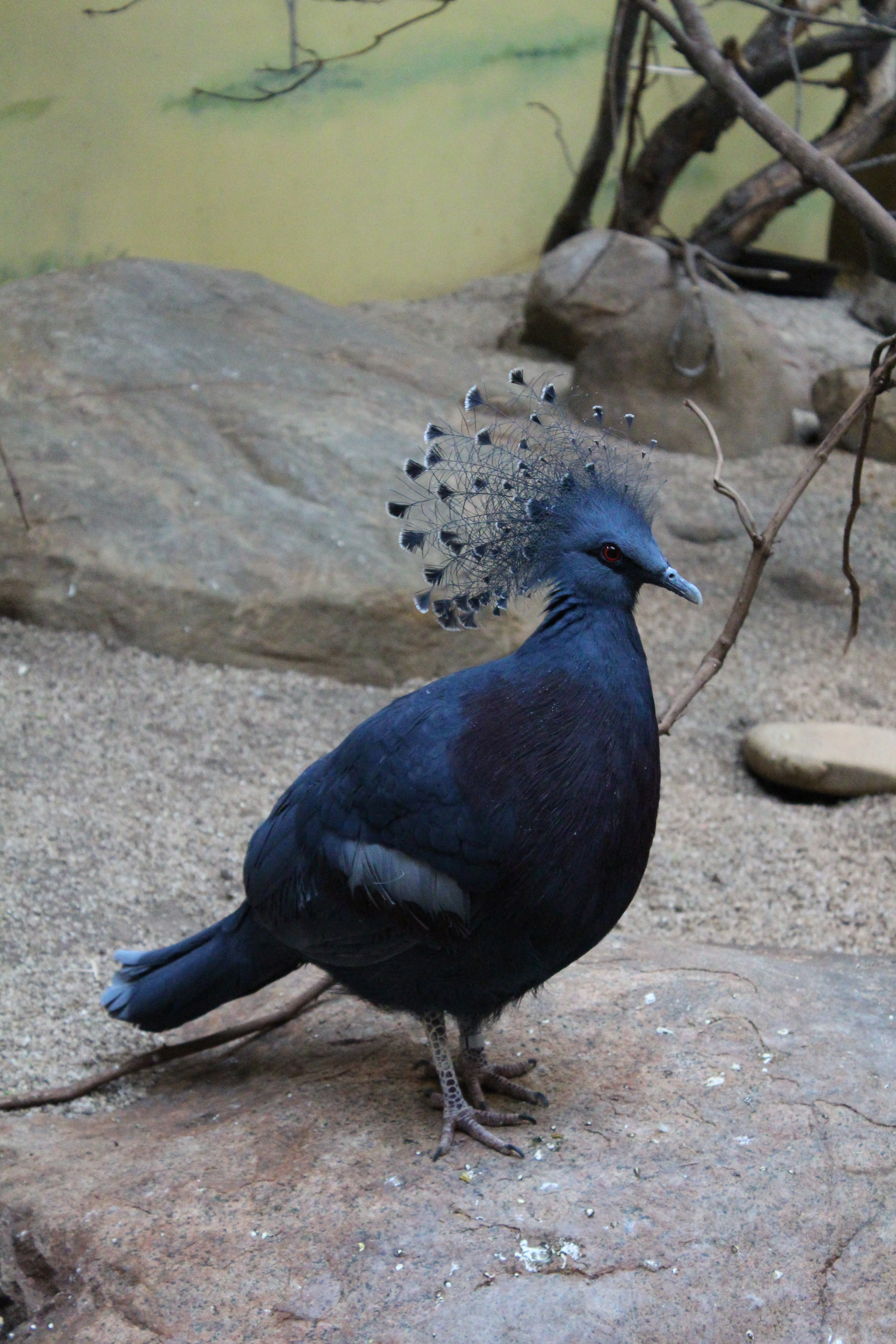

Located in the first room of the Aviary are the demoiselle crane, blue-throated macaws, Southern pudu, birds from the Amazon rainforest, and rhinoceros hornbills. There is an Australian walkthrough exhibit where people feed either budgerigars or many of the other bird species in the room. This currently features birds from either Australia, Asia, or Africa, such as Victoria crowned pigeons, Gouldian finches, spur-winged plover, long-tailed finch, red-throated parrotfinch, Raggiana bird-of-paradise, blue-faced parrot finch, kagu, pheasant pigeons, Nicobar pigeon, scarlet-chested parrot, owl finch, star finch, pink-necked fruit dove, thick-billed ground pigeon, Luzon bleeding-heart dove, plum-headed finch, Pekin robin, crested wood partridge, great argus, bearded barbet, violet-backed starling, Madagascar buttonquail, emerald starling, golden-breasted starling, superb starling, and blue-bellied rollers. The children's area includes emperor tamarins, lowland pacas, southern three-banded armadillos, and Linnaeus's two-toed sloths.

=== The Rescue Roost ===
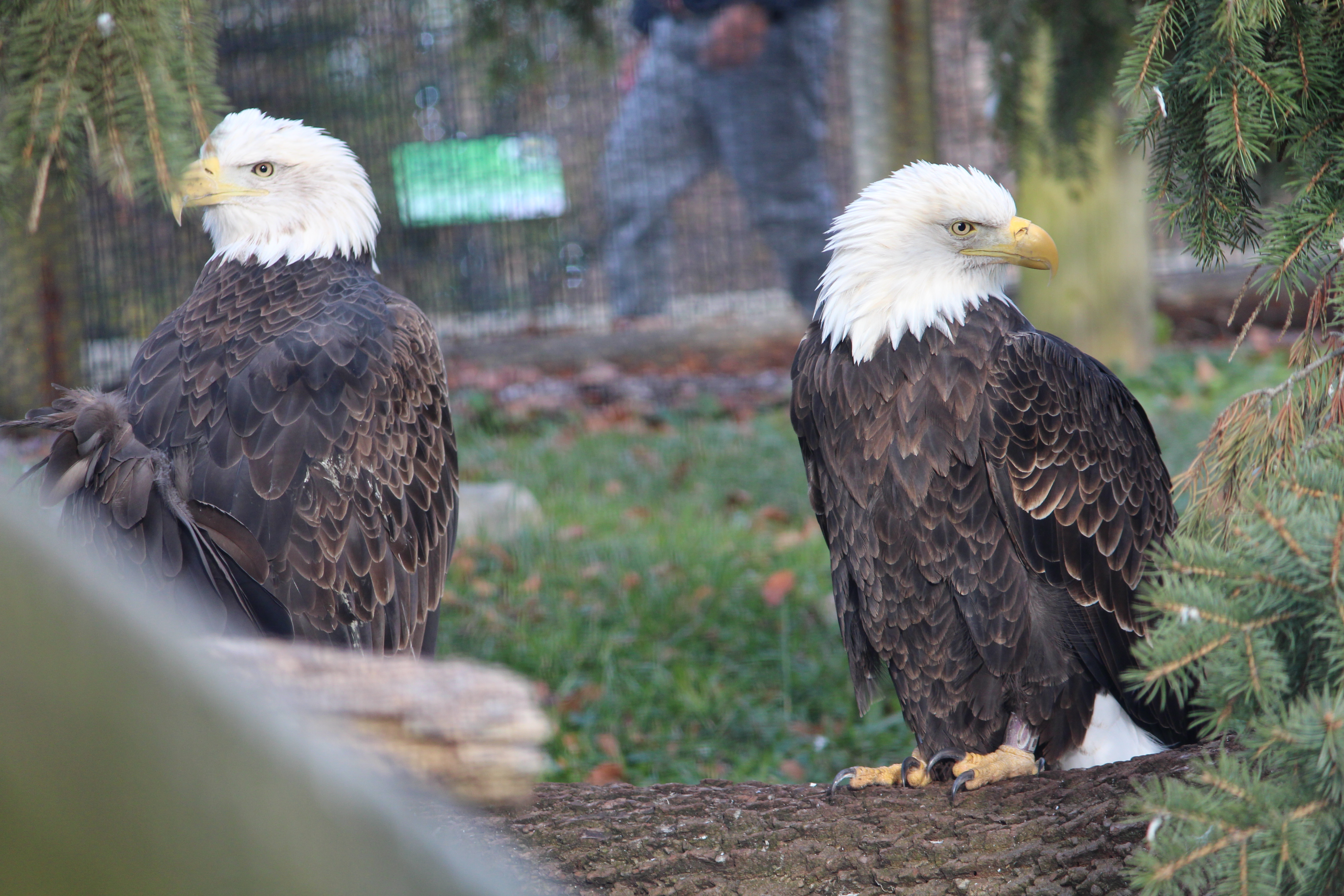

The bald eagle exhibit and rescue is located in the middle of the north side pedestrian ramp to the bridge. The first inhabitants had an injured wing and a blind eye respectively.

=== Cassowary Crossing ===
Cassowary Crossing is located near the south-side ramp for the Anthony Wayne Trail Footbridge. The exhibit features the southern cassowary.

=== Ziems Conservatory ===
Ziems Conservatory is available year-round for guests to view and learn about plant life. It is also the winter home to the Galapagos tortoise.

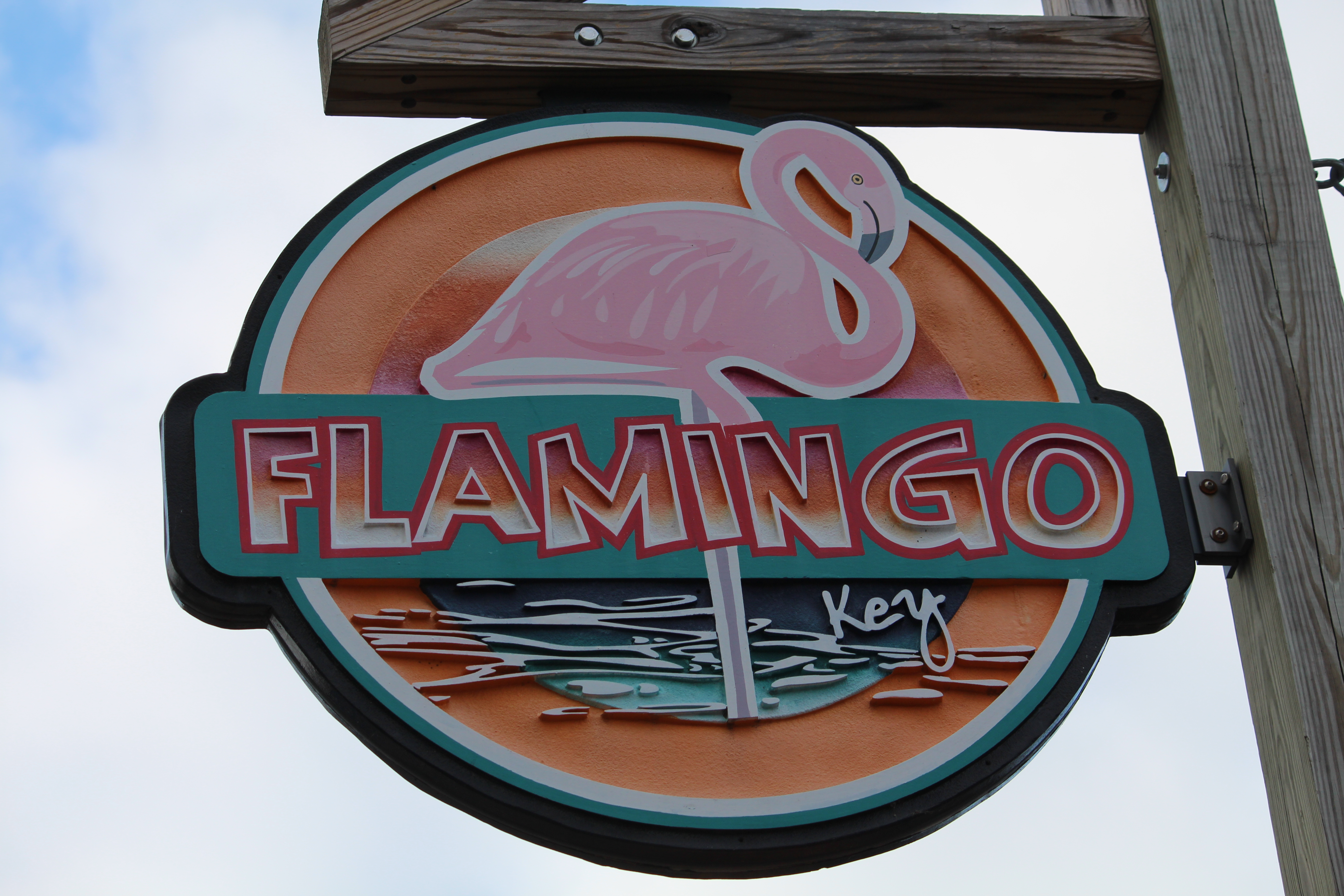

=== Flamingo Key ===
An outdoor pond area consisting of flamingos, Dalmatian pelicans, scarlet ibises, roseate spoonbills, white-breasted cormorants, and other local native and exotic waterfowl including a mudhen.

=== Kingdom of the Apes ===
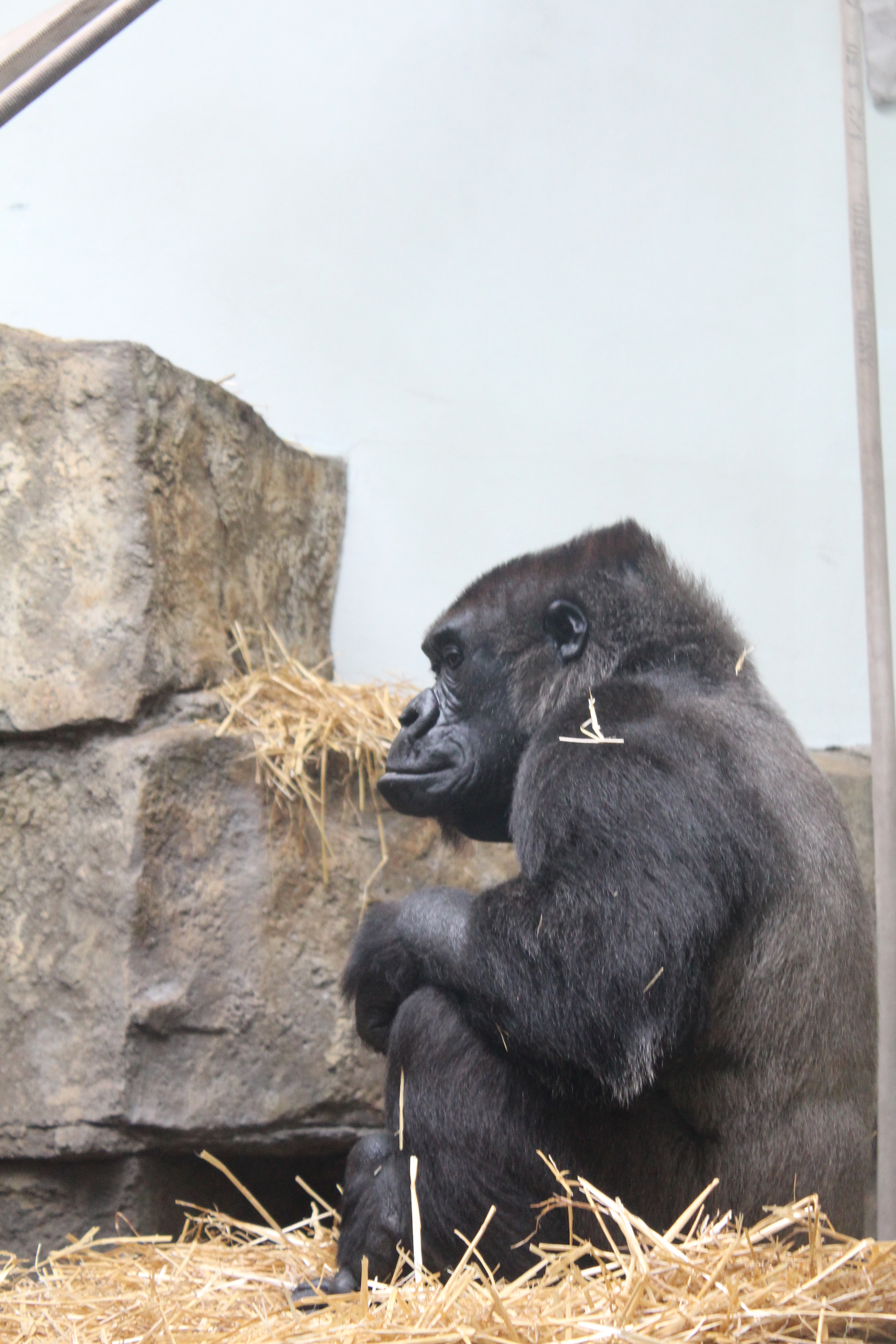

In 1993, the Kingdom of the Apes exhibit opened. It now holds Bornean orangutans and western lowland gorillas. The gorillas have Gorilla Meadow, which has an area of 0.3 acres (1,200 m^{2}). The orangutan exhibit has a pool in the outdoor space and climbing structures. Two chimpanzees, named Fifi and Harvey, used to be on exhibit at the Toledo Zoo. After the death of the chimpanzees from old age in 2009 and 2011, the zoo chose not to continue the chimpanzee exhibit.

=== ProMedica Museum of Natural History ===
Opened in 1938 as the Museum of Science, this museum focuses on natural history. The Museum of Science closed in 2017 for a major renovation and reopened on May 31, 2019, as the ProMedica Museum of Natural History. A two-story tropical rainforest atrium that is surrounded by 30-foot trees, bushes, and orchids was added as part of the renovation.

The main-level exhibits include Ohio: After the Ice, Rivers & Streams, and Wetland & Lakes.

Ohio: After the Ice features dioramas of animals that roamed the land, such as woolly mammoths, saber-tooth cats, stag moose, ground sloths, giant beavers and American lions. Oak Forest lets visitors see life from an ant's perspective and features creatures that are hidden such as an American toad, red-backed salamander, ring-necked snake. Rivers & Streams features salamanders, an Eastern hellbender, and a touch tank containing lake sturgeon. Wetland & Lakes features a rotunda of creatures who live in Lake Erie including the common watersnake, sunfishes, minnows, American bullfrog, and Blanding's turtle.

The upper level focuses on venomous creatures and the exhibits on this floor include Arthodpods, Hall of Venom, Venomous Snakes, and Komodo Dragon.

The Komodo Dragon exhibit features two enclosures for the zoo's Komodo dragons. Arthropods feature tarantulas, velvet ants, black widow, walking sticks, beetles, and coconut crab. Hall of Venom features the Burmese vine snake, Gila monster, false water cobra, Paradise flying snake, ribbed newts, lionfish, stonefish and blue-banded sea krait. Venomous Snakes features such as the king cobra, black-tailed rattlesnake, Western diamondback rattlesnake, Arizona black rattlesnake, Russell's viper, variable bush viper, eastern massasauga, rhinoceros viper and Santa Catalina rattlesnake.

=== Nature's Neighborhood ===
Nature's Neighborhood is located next to the Museum of Science. It currently contains African pygmy goats, silkie chickens, honeybees, leafcutter ants, feathertail gliders, a tamandua, guinea pigs, crayfish, corn snakes, cockatiels, rats, macaws, an opossum as well as various cats and rabbits. The structure features are a Play Stream, Contact Yard, and a large playground. The area is designed with child safety in mind, featuring a "one-way in, one-way out" construction.

=== Penguin Beach ===
The Penguin Beach was built in 2014 and features African penguins and multiple species of duck including the long-tailed duck, Baer's pochard, spectacled eider, and the harlequin duck. This is an outdoor exhibit with a little overhead bridge and an underwater viewing area. This exhibit has produced multiple offspring since its opening.

=== Pheasantry ===
Located from the right of the Historic Carousel and north from the playground, this exhibit was built during the aquarium renovation to house kiwi but has also an outdoor viewing of many birds, especially gamebirds including the Elliot's pheasant, green junglefowl, Berlioz's silver pheasant, Mikado pheasant, Reeves's pheasant, Himalayan monal, Swinhoe's pheasant, and Edwards's pheasant. Non-gamebirds include the North Island brown kiwi, crested pigeon, white-rumped shama, tawny frogmouth, chestnut-breasted malkoha, spectacled owl, blue-faced honeyeater, Chinese hwamei, red-billed blue magpie, crested coua, mandarin duck, lesser bird-of-paradise, snowy owl, fawn-breasted bowerbird, laughing kookaburra, and the Australian magpie.

=== Primate Forest ===
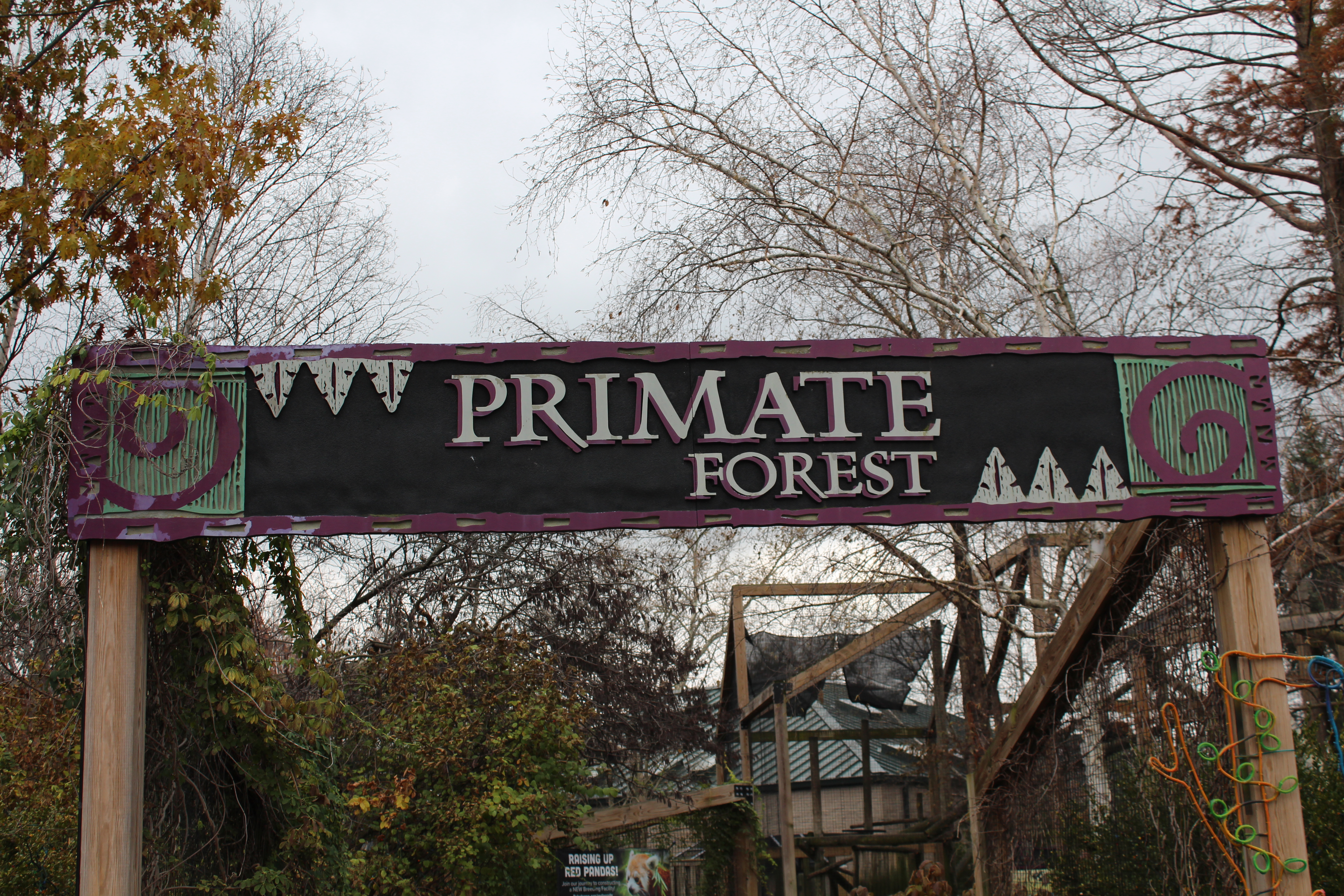

Located in the Main Plaza, this exhibit holds ring-tailed lemurs, mongoose lemurs, black-and-white colobuses, Allen's swamp monkeys, François' langurs, red pandas, and white-cheeked gibbons. Located near the Primate Forest is the aviary breeding center, which is home to cinereous vultures, waldrapp ibises, scaly-sided mergansers, crested guineafowl, kori bustards, white storks, capercaillies, and saddle-billed storks.

=== Reptile House ===
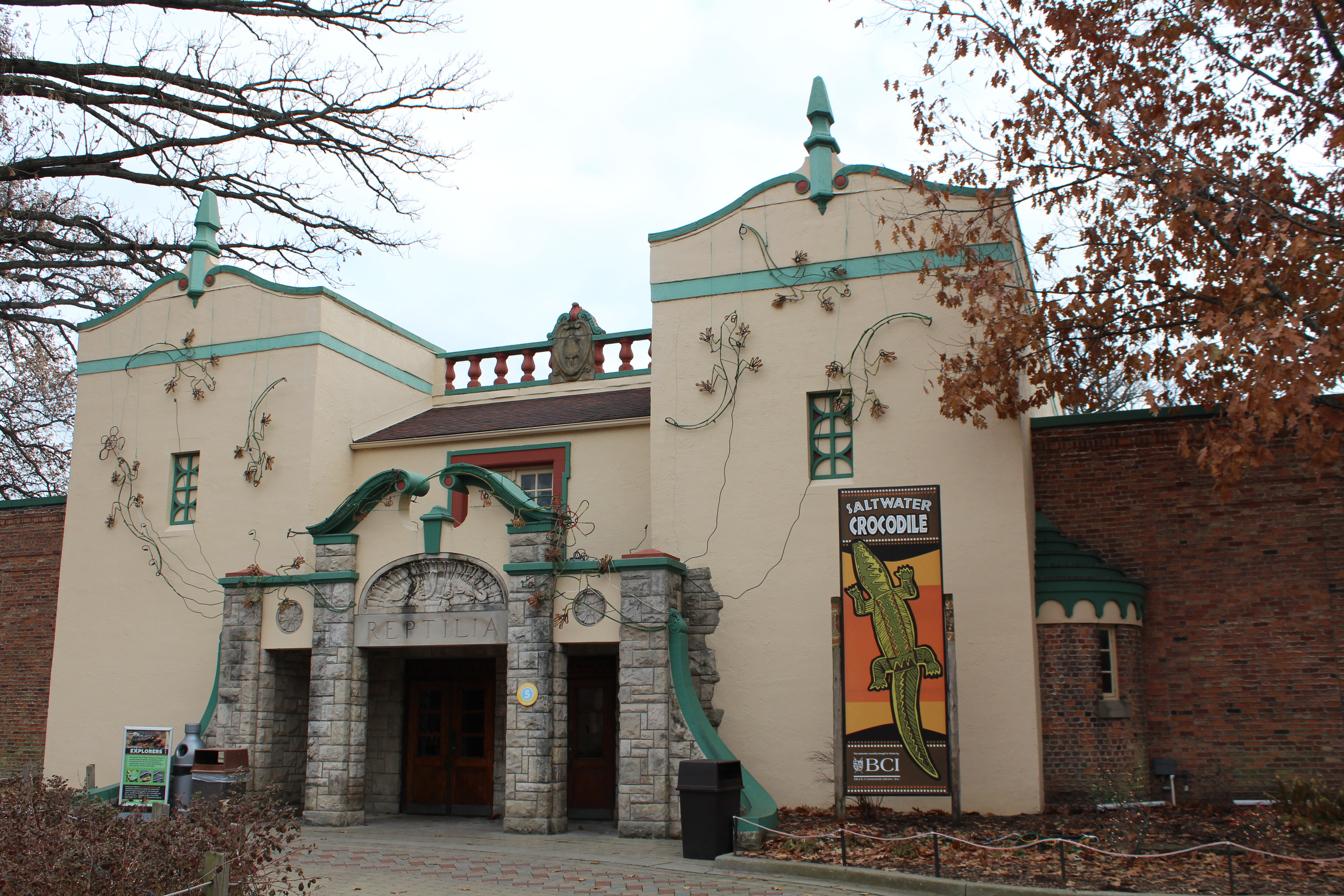

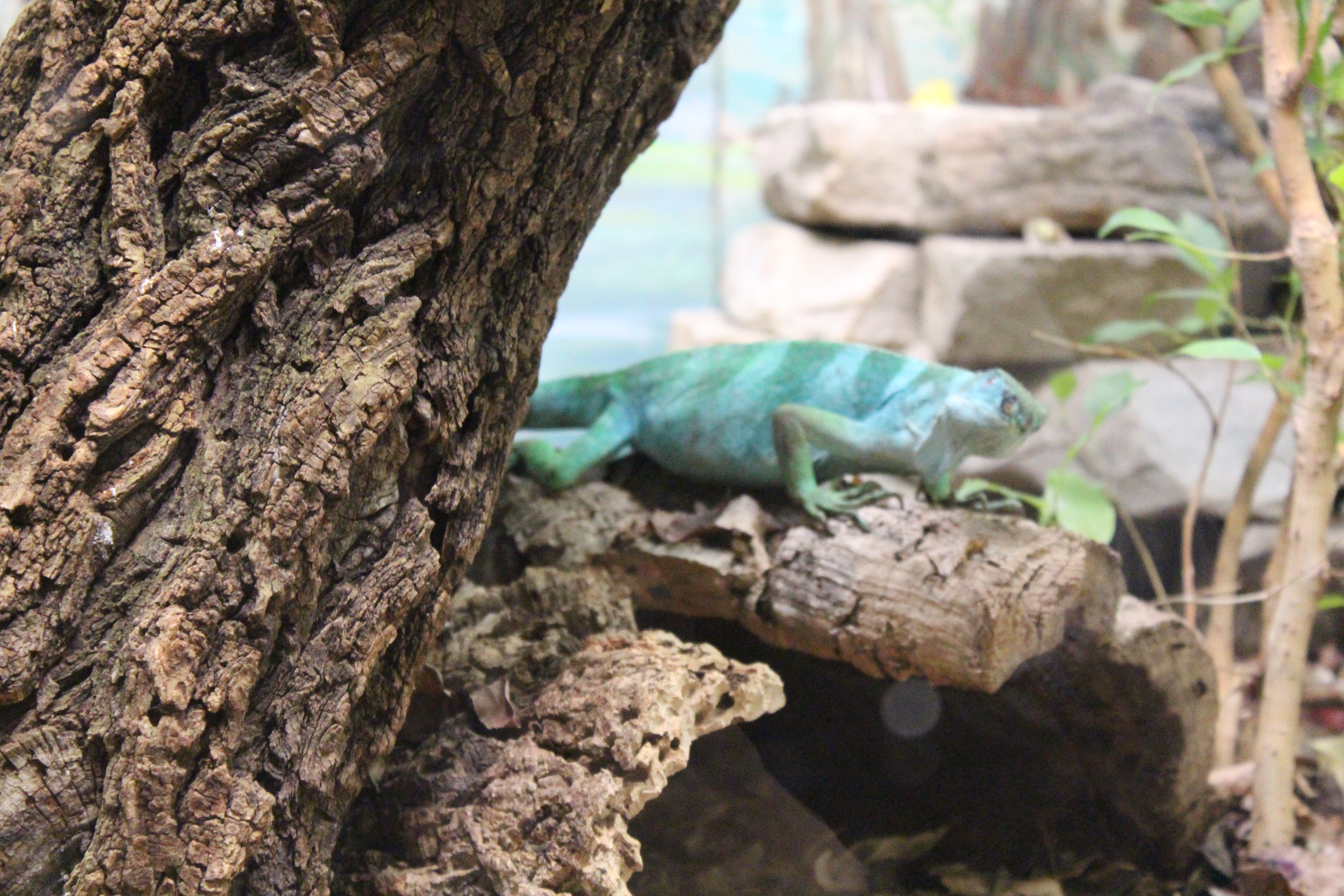

The Reptile House currently holds 1000 species of snakes, lizards, and a saltwater crocodile. Behind it was a Native Ohio Species Area, featuring natural wetland structures and native turtles such as spiny softshell turtles and spotted turtles. Near it is a raptor barn and at the exit is an exhibit for red-footed tortoises and leopard tortoises. Former species include the Cuban crocodile, Burmese mountain tortoises, Chinese alligators, and tegus. It closed in 2025 and will be remodeled and opened in 2026.

=== Tembo Trail ===
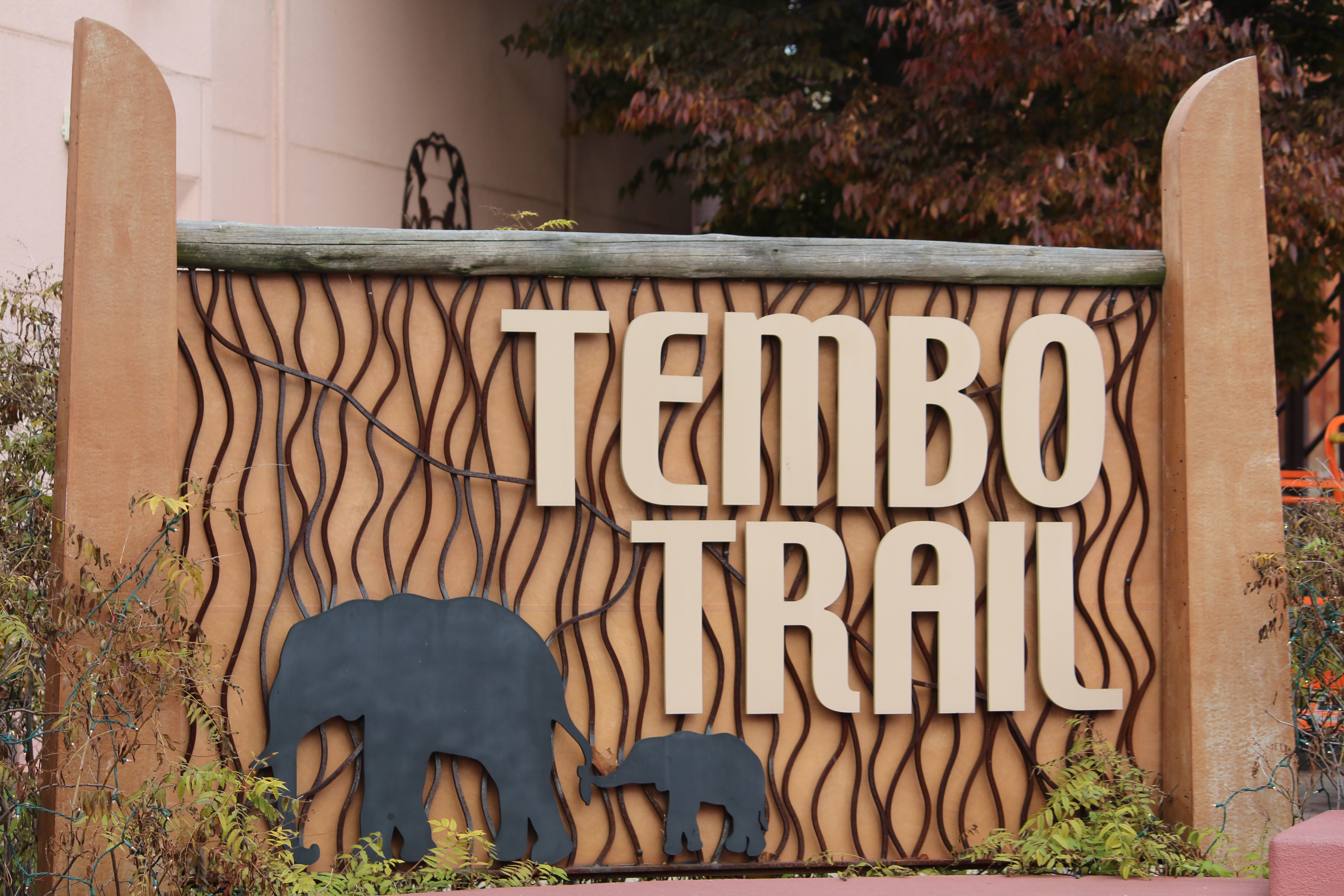

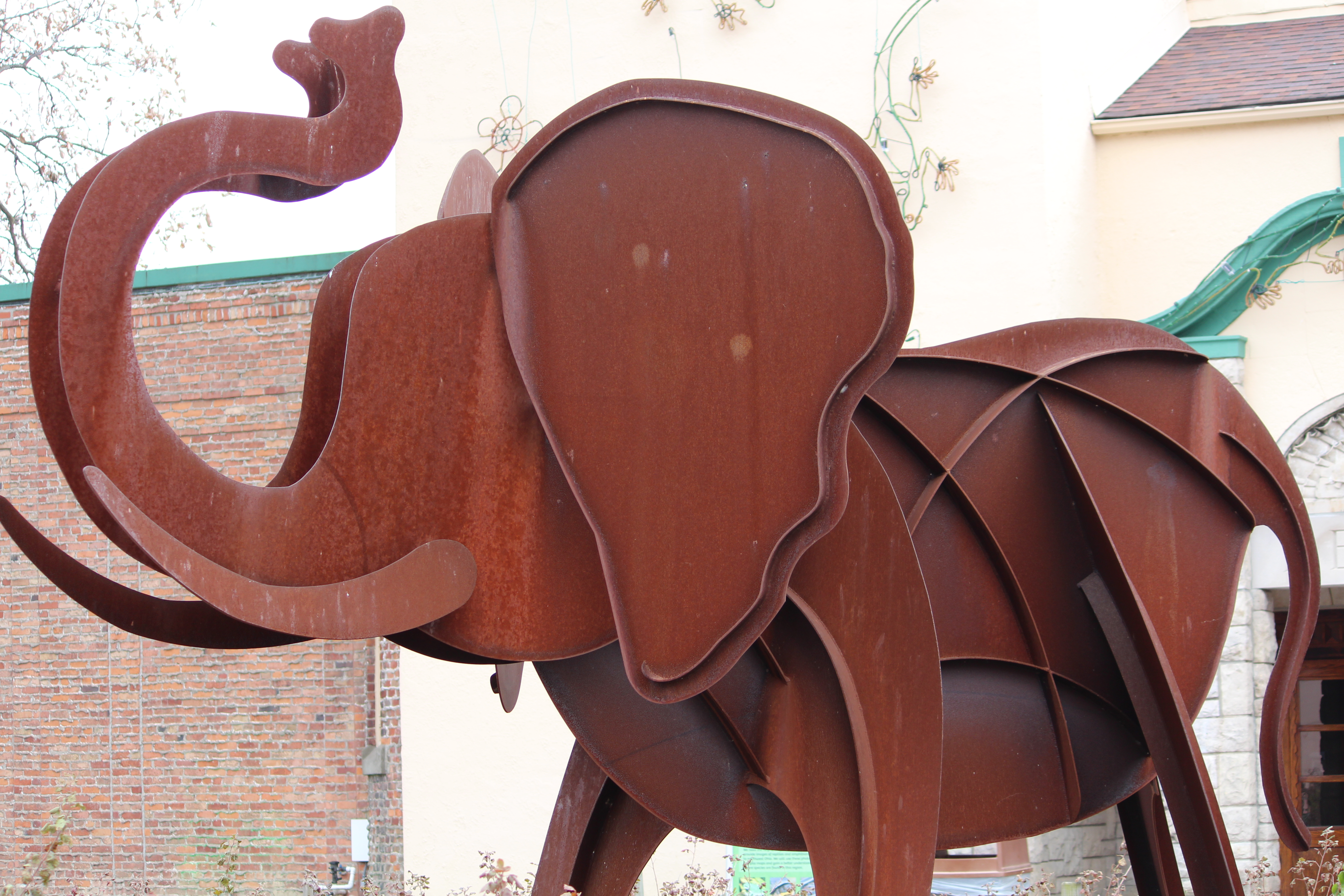

Tembo Trail is located on the south side of the zoo and is one of the largest areas within the zoo. Tembo Trail currently features African elephants, hippos, North American river otters, grizzly bears, Tasmanian devils, meerkats, Bactrian camels, yaks, naked mole rats, and a Kodiak bear named Dodge. In the recent past, Tembo Trail has also featured slender-snouted crocodiles, spotted-necked otters, southern white rhinos, dromedaries, and white lions on loan from Siegfried and Roy. Tembo Trail exhibits an Indian rhinoceros named Aashish who was acquired from The Wilds in early 2018.

One of the most famous exhibits within Tembo Trail is the Hippoquarium. The Hippoquarium houses the zoo's two hippopotamuses, which can be viewed underwater. The Toledo Zoo was the first to have such viewing of hippos and was also the first to film the underwater birth of a hippopotamus.

=== Tiger Terrace ===
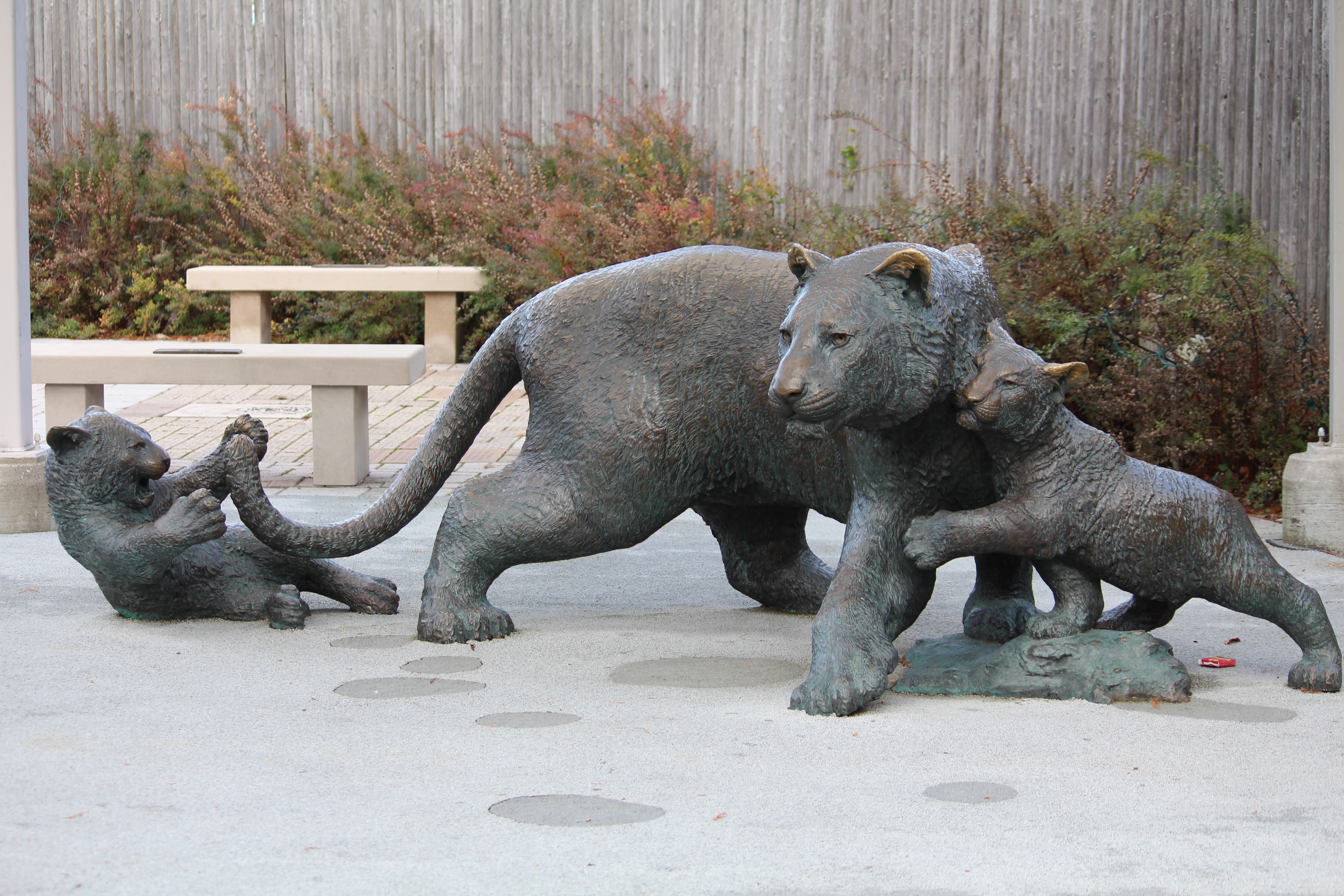

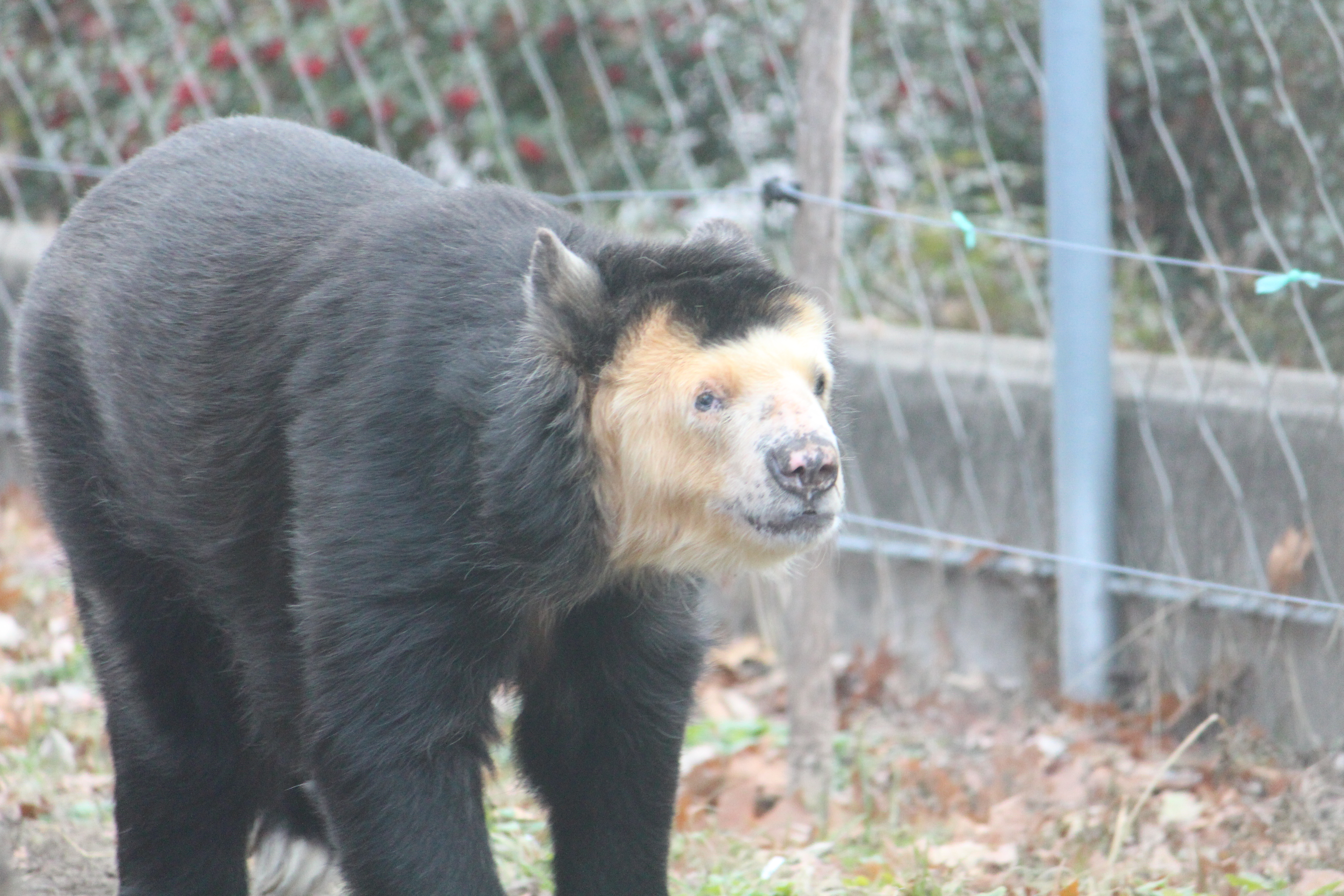

Tiger Terrace includes Amur tigers, Patagonian maras, and North American cougars. It also holds maned wolves and dingoes that are located near the ramp for the Anthony Wayne Trail Footbridge. Former species have included white-naped cranes, sloth bears, and an Andean bear named Nieve, who at 29 years old was the oldest recorded female Andean bear on the planet. She died in 2022.

=== Snow Leopards ===
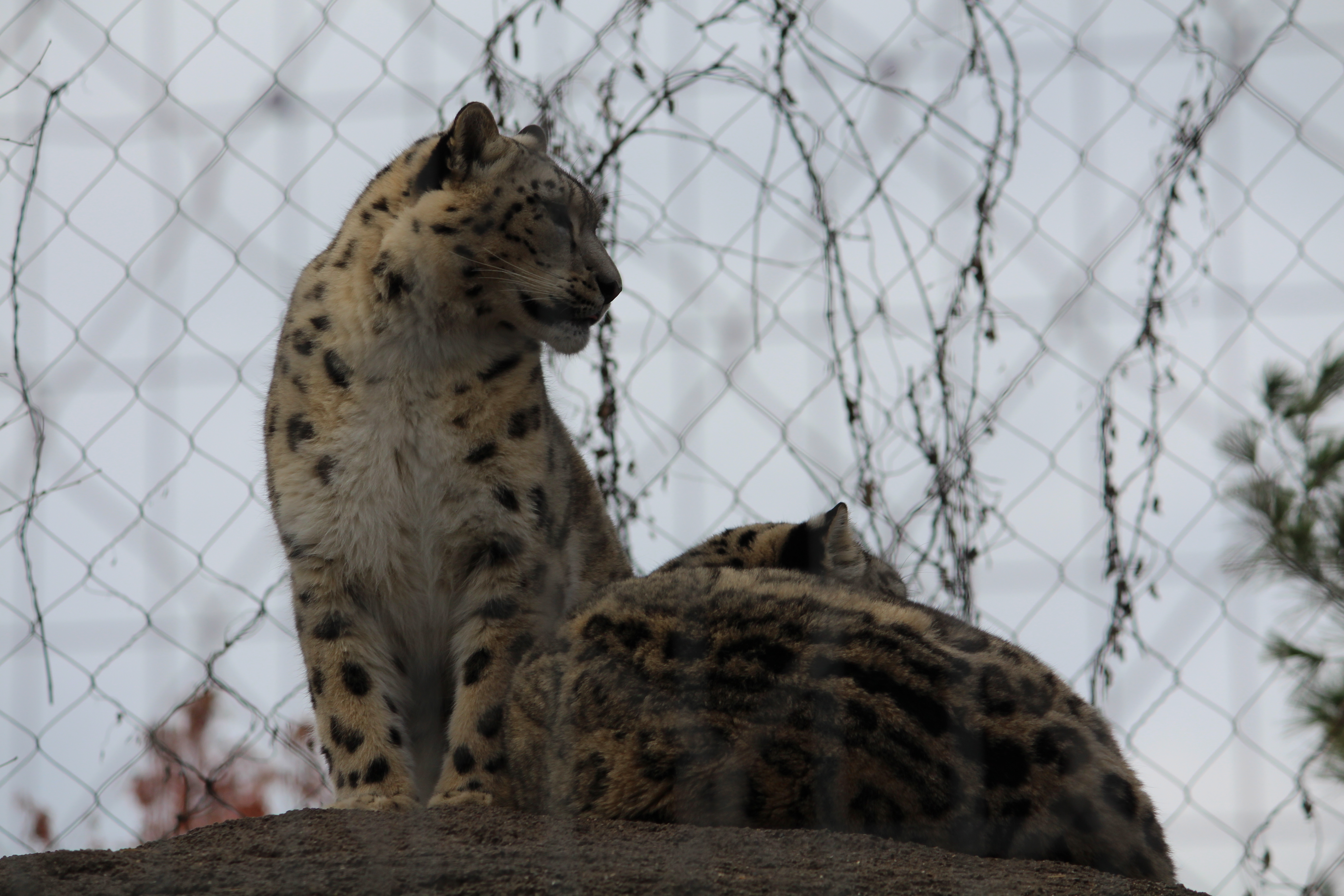

The exhibit features two connected mesh/chain link enclosures. The zoo's breeding pair have produced multiple cubs. A female cub, named Dariga, was born in October 2017. Another female cub, named Babochka, was born in May 2019.

== Events and attractions ==
=== Aerial Adventure Course ===
Guests of the zoo can participate in various above-ground adventures in Africa! The Aerial Adventure course includes zip lining, a sky bridge, a quick jump, a flight line, and a challenge course.

=== African Carousel ===
Located in Africa!, the merry-go-round is decorated with hand-crafted African animals.

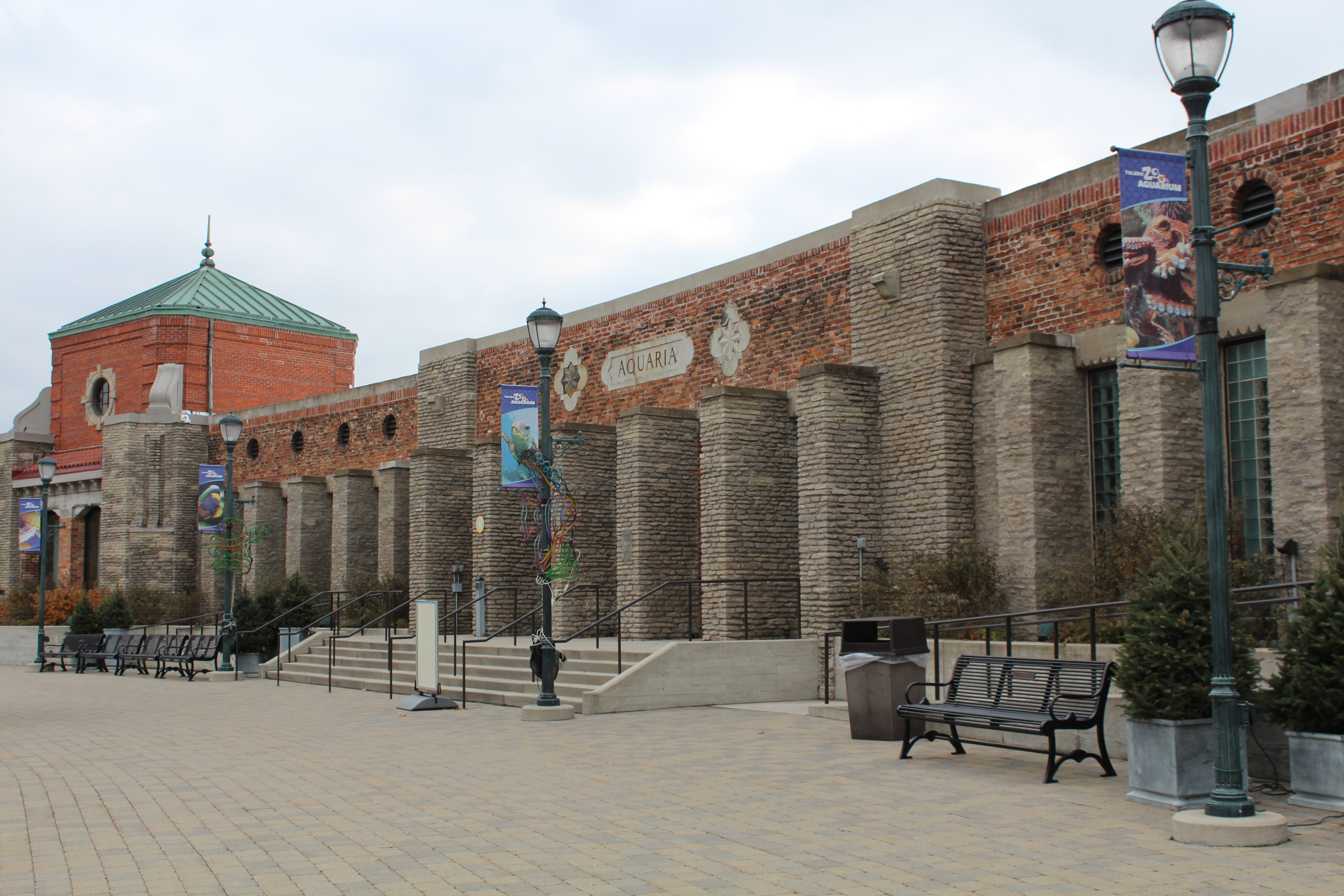

=== Aquarium ===
Since the reopening and restructuring of the Aquarium, guests can participate in various interactive experiences, including live dive feeding demonstrations, a touch tank, and ocean lab.

=== Aquarium Adventure Trail ===
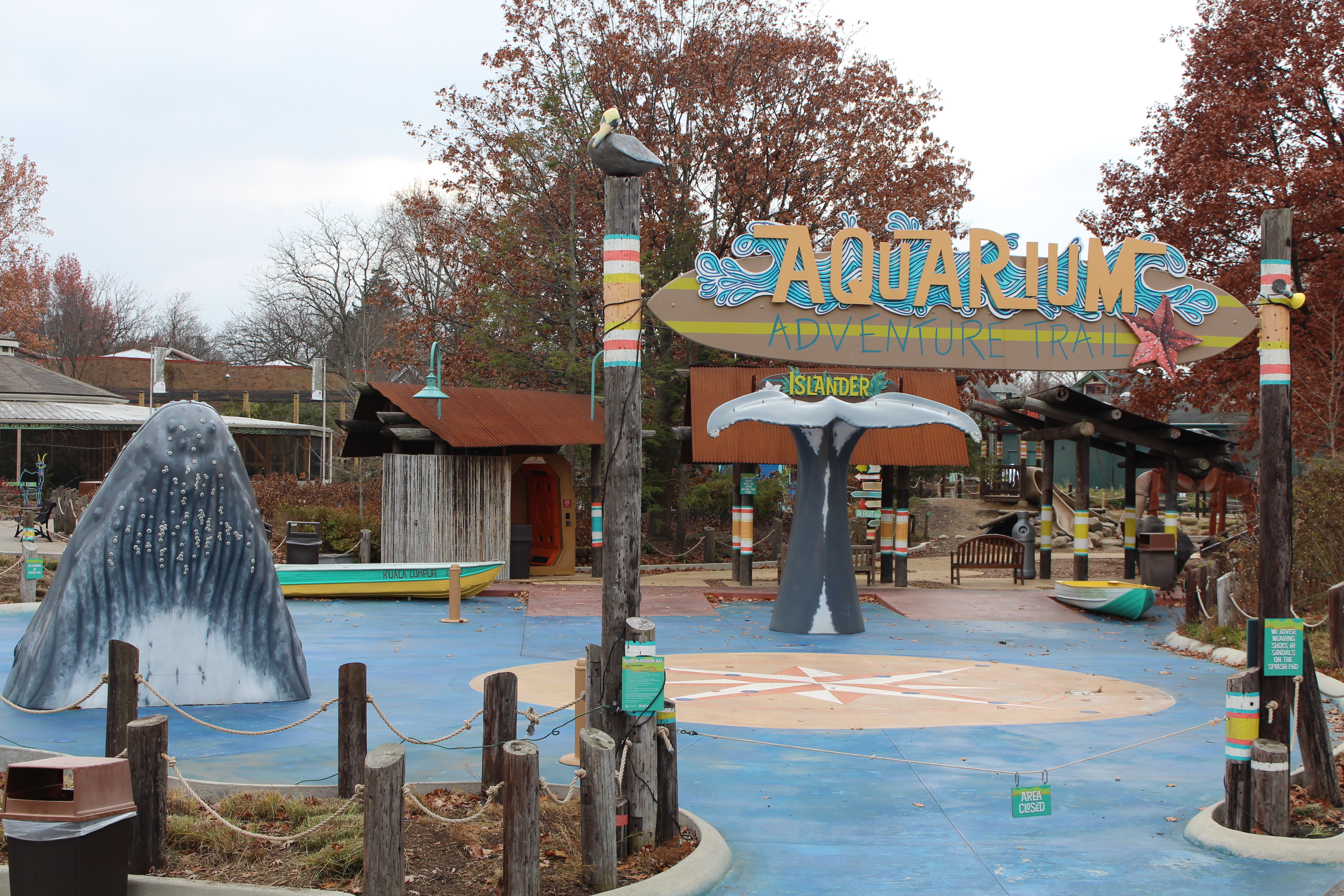

The Aquarium Adventure Trail is a newly installed attraction for kids to cool off during the summer months. It includes a splash pad as well as various other activities for children.

=== Feast with the Beasts ===
An evening of dining and animal encounters, the fundraiser also includes an auction and the opportunity to learn more about enrichment and training for the animals. In 2017, this event hosted 137 guests and raised $66,000 for the TZS.

=== Garden Tours ===
The Toledo Zoo & Aquarium does tours with their horticulture staff to discuss everything gardening. They even include various workshops throughout the year.

=== The Lights Before Christmas ===
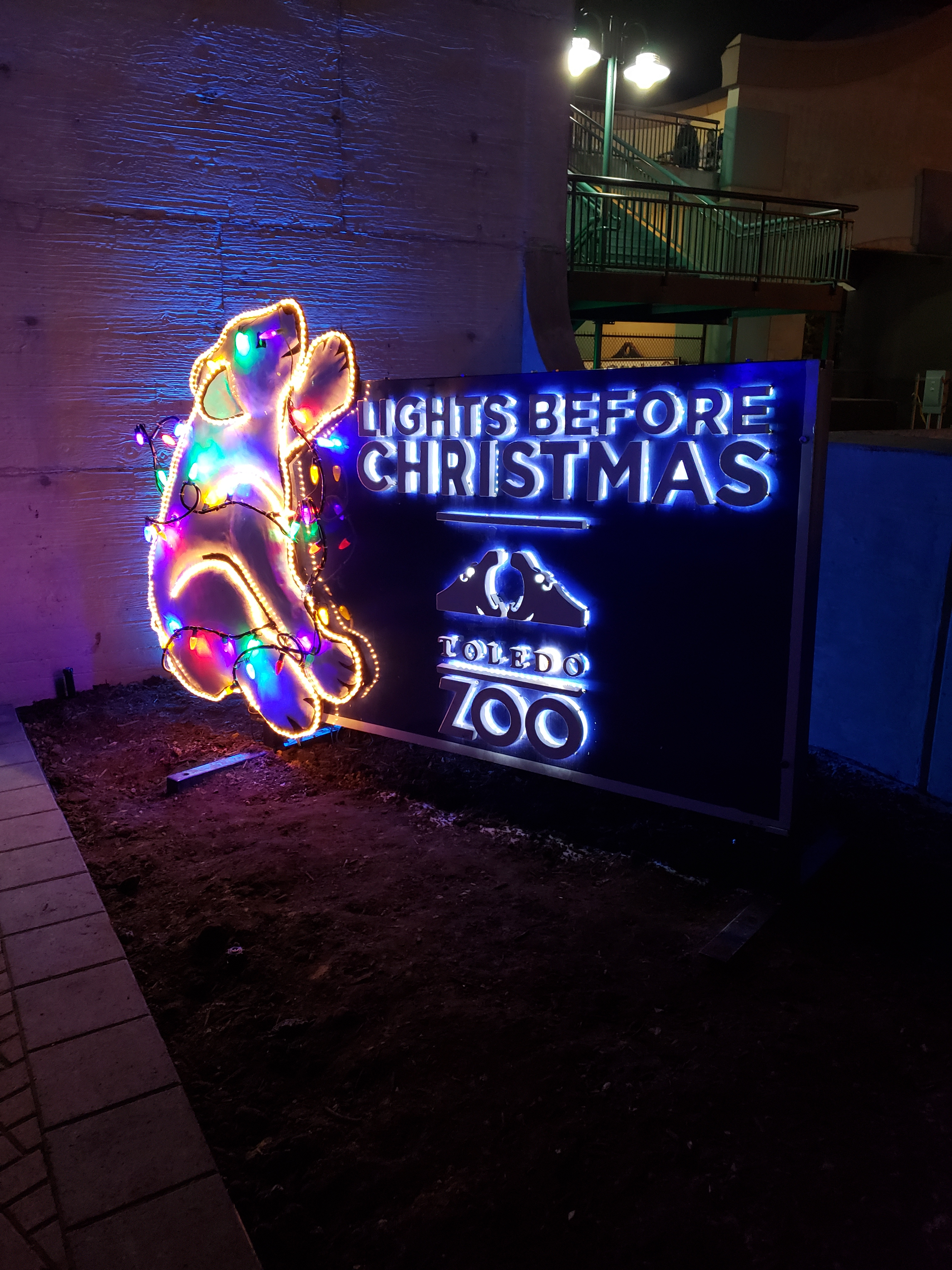

The Lights Before Christmas is an annual event held by the Toledo Zoo & Aquarium which began in 1986, with only 70,000 bulbs and hosted just as many guests to the zoo. Most summer attractions are closed, but all the buildings and trees are decorated with Christmas lights. It features over one million Christmas lights, a winter village including an ice slide and ice bumper cars, the Arctic Blast game, a new light show projected on the carnivore cafe, model trains from the Swanton Area Railroad, and Santa Claus. The "Big Tree", an 85-foot (26 m) Norway spruce tree, contains over 35,000 LED lights and has been honored as being ranked in the top 10 Christmas trees to see. The main show, Dancing Lights, is near Cheetah Valley. It is repeated several times every night. It uses LED wide-angle mini lights that flash along with Christmas music. All this is done using nearly 10 miles (16 km) of extension cords.

=== Little Boo at the Zoo/Pumpkin Path ===
This event is held in October yearly for a family friendly Halloween celebration. There is trick or treating, special demonstrations, and the zoo is transformed into a Halloween wonderland. You can also see the animals enjoy the leftover pumpkins as part of their animal enrichment programs.

=== Luminous Nights ===
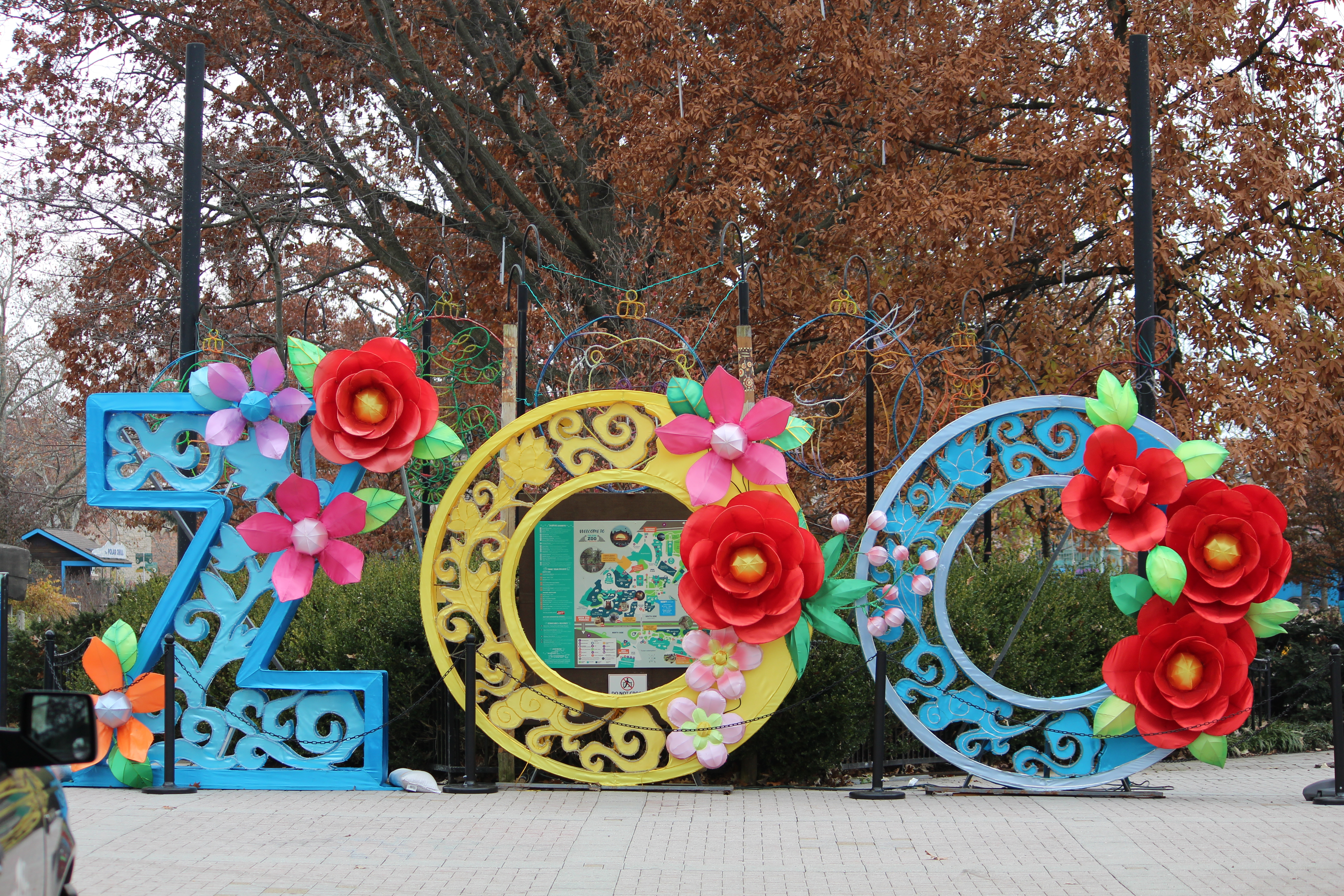

Started in 2017, this fall event lights up the zoo with over 500 hand-made Chinese lanterns. It also includes cultural activities led by international students from the local universities.

=== Medical Mutual Dart Frog Dash ===
This yearly run helps with fundraising for the Toledo Zoo & Aquarium as well as conservation efforts. It is a 5K race and a 5K fun run/walk, that takes place through zoo grounds and the surrounding areas. The 2017 Dart Frog Dash had 2,100 participants and raised $62,000 for conservation.

=== Music Under the Stars ===
Started in 1936, this summer program features various musical stylings performed by the Toledo Symphony Orchestra. It has had performers such as conductor Charles W. Roth, Jules Blair, Fred Seymour, Conductor Samuel P. Szor (who in 2000 celebrated his 48th year of Music Under the Stars), conductor Leopold Stokowski and more.

=== Nature's Neighborhood ===
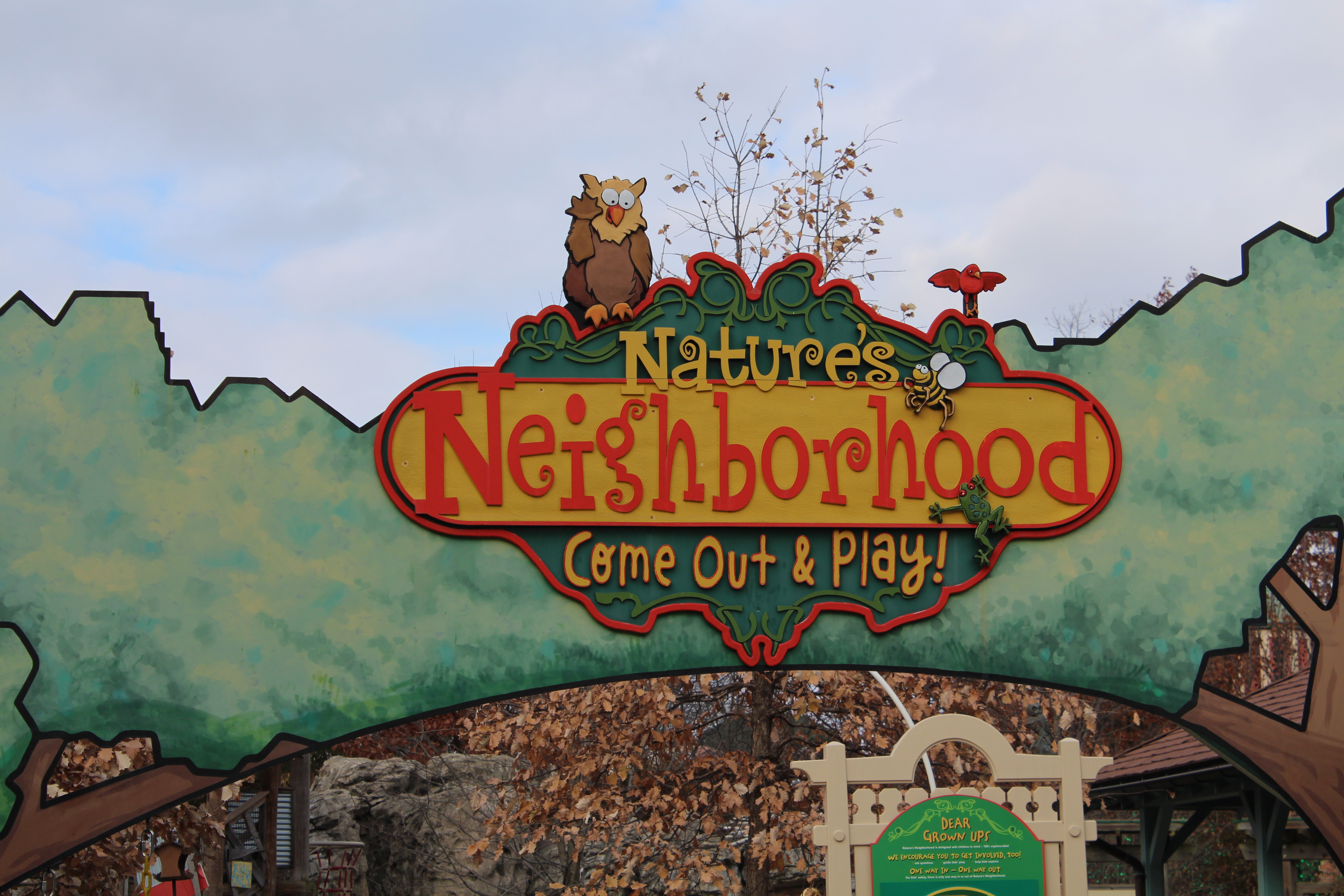

Nature's Neighborhood is a hands-on children's exhibit featuring both indoor and outdoor activities. They offer live animal shows, a petting zoo, climbing equipment and various other items to teach conservation and animal care to children.

=== Once Upon a Vine ===
This yearly fundraising event is usually held in March at the Toledo Zoo, and includes dinner and a live auction to raise funds for the Toledo Zoo & Aquarium. In 2017, the event had 135 guests and raised $63,000 for the Toledo Zoo & Aquarium.

=== Safari Railway ===
Since moving the train from the south campus to the north, the Safari Railway allows guests an informational ride around the plains of Africa! exhibit.

=== Summer Concert Series ===
Together with Live Nation, the Toledo Zoo hosts a summer series of concerts where well-known acts take over the historic Amphitheater. In 2017, over 18,000 people attended these concerts.

=== Tower Ridge ===
Located in Africa, Tower Ridge allows guests of the zoo to hand feed the herd of giraffes.

=== Wild about Art ===
This summer event is an annual art show available to all zoo guests featuring local and regional artists. The preview to this event featured 115 guests in 2015 and the fundraiser brought $15,000 for the Toledo Zoo & Aquarium.

=== Wine Tasting ===
Held in the spring, the annual wine-tasting event allows guests to enjoy various wine samples along with live music.

=== Zoo Brew ===
Zoo Brew is an adults-only event, held in the fall, that highlights samples from local Toledo breweries.

=== ZootoDo ===
ZootoDo, is one of the most anticipated events held at the Toledo Zoo & Aquarium. It is a black tie with tennis shoes affair offering live entertainment, house specialties, and more. It is a fundraising event used for conservation during the summer months. In 2017, the event had 1800 guests and raised $240,000 towards animal conservation.

== Conservation efforts ==
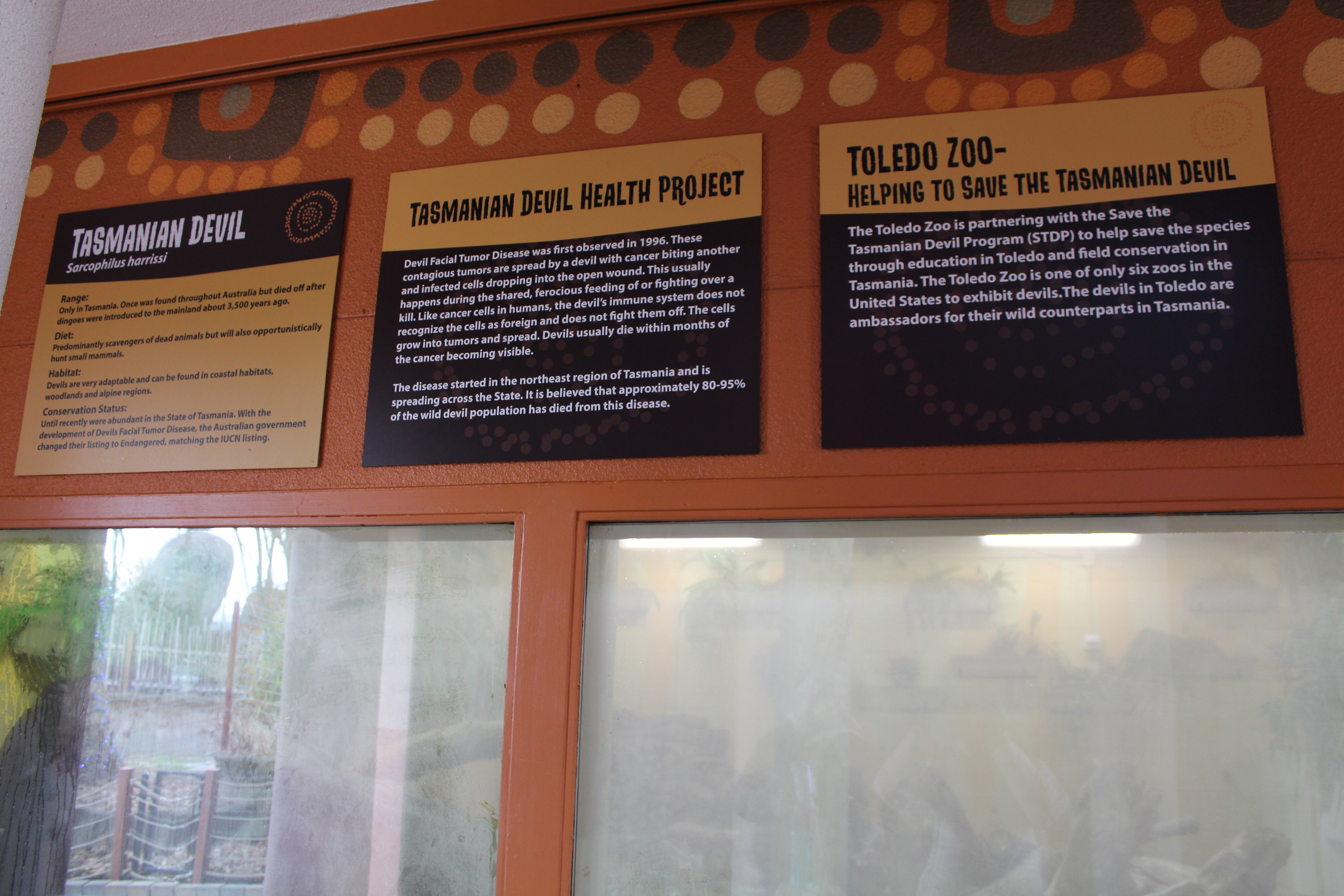

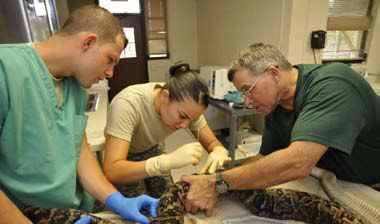
A Cuban boa gets a microchip from Toledo Zoo biologist.

The zoo has several projects around the world working with wildlife and habitats. Zoo employees run the majority of their research abroad, and often participate in expeditions. Some of the most prominent conservation programs are the Aruba island rattlesnake program, West Indian boa conservation, the Kihansi spray toad program (which served to restore a wild population that was declared extinct).

The zoo has a department called Wild Toledo, which focuses on local conservation efforts and scientific research. This conservation department works to re-introduce hellbenders to their native habitat in southeastern Ohio, release thousands of monarch butterflies for fall migration, rear the federally endangered Mitchell's satyr butterfly, restore native prairie habitat in urban Toledo, conduct research on the spatial ecology and population dynamic of several species of threatened turtles, conduct health assessments and vaccinations of local mesopredators, research the movement and presence/absence of native Ohio wildlife with trail cameras, conduct vegetation analysis on ecosystems around the region and work to support and restore native pollinators. Wild Toledo runs three summer field camps aimed at 10-13-year-olds interested in field research and conservation. Wild Toledo also has several partnerships with educational facilities within northwest Ohio where native prairies are installed and interpreted for students.

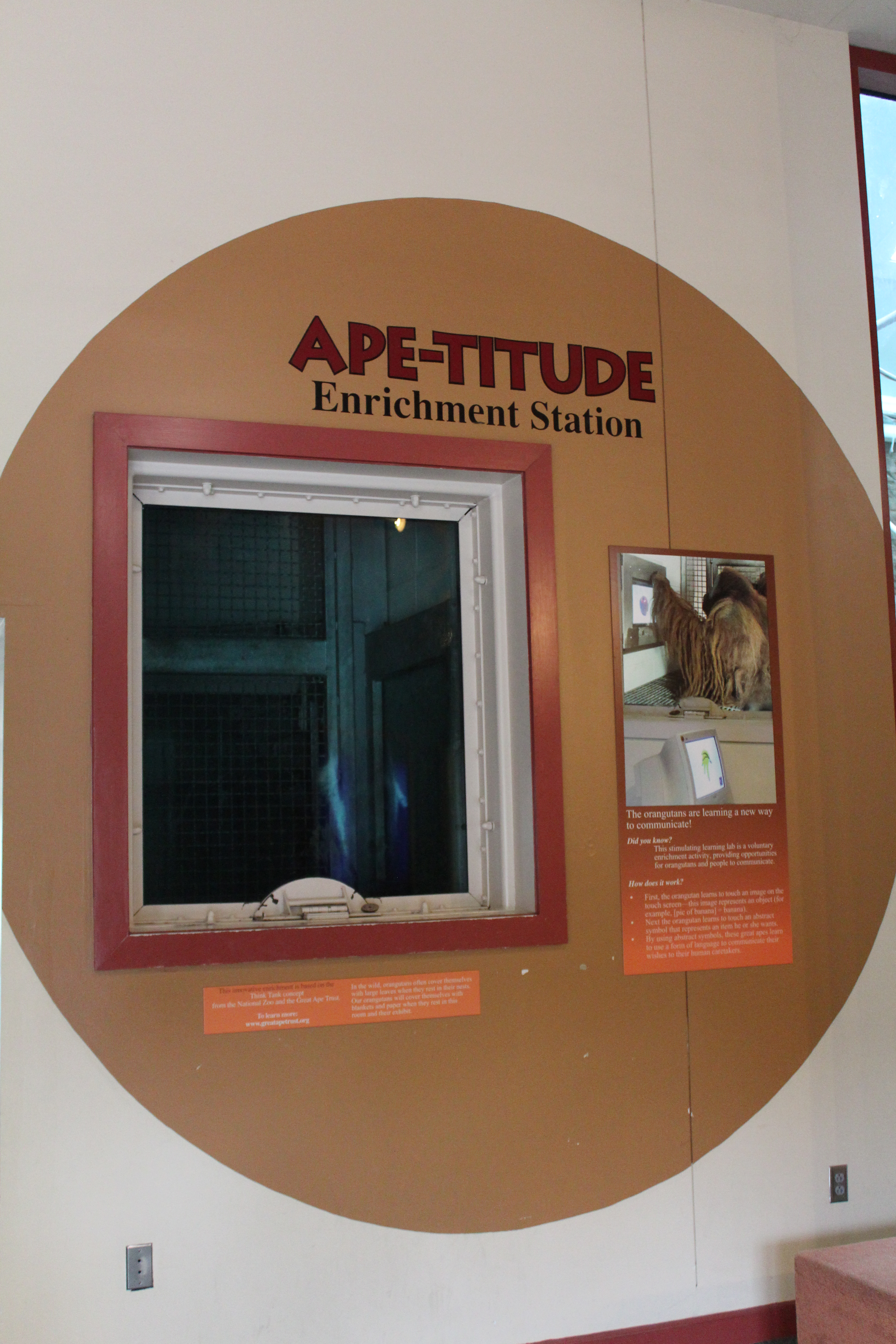

The Toledo Zoo & Aquarium also currently works with the Association of Zoos & Aquariums as part of their Species Survival Plans, in which they breed animals and trade animals with other zoos around the world to reestablish the population of at-risk animals. The purpose of trading and only breeding certain animals is to maintain clean genetics as well as be able to control the population.

Current conservation projects at the zoo include the Species Survival Program, Wild Toledo, as well as working in the Arctic with polar bears and the Steller's eider, working with Wyoming on a Wyoming toad effort, Reintroducing the Mitchell's satyr butterflies to Indiana and Michigan, working with Ohio and Mexico on the monarch butterfly, a Cuban boa project in Cuba, the Aruba Island rattlesnake program in Aruba, assisting Michigan with the piping plover, the Karner blue butterfly program in Michigan and Ohio, multiple projects in Ohio including hellbenders, native prairies, lake sturgeon, turtles, and the Kirtland's snake. Internationally outside of North America, the Toledo Zoo & Aquarium is working on projects involving the Kihansi spray toad in Tanzania, snow leopard in Kyrgyzstan, the scaly-sided merganser in China, the Tasmanian devil in Tasmania, kiwis in New Zealand, and Pacific Island birds.

== Accolades and awards ==
=== 1999 ===
The renovations of the Aviary received an exhibit of the year award from the AZA.

=== 2010–2020 ===
Nature's Neighborhood received an Exhibit of the Year award from the AZA in 2011.

The Knot.com named the catering and sales department in their Best of Weddings as Brides' Choice in 2012 and 2013.

In 2014 the Toledo Zoo was named the Best Zoo in America by USA Today. It was also ranked the #2 zoo in America by Family Fun Magazine, and also the 8th most family-friendly attractions. Other areas of the zoo also received special recognition in 2014. The Knot.com named the catering and sales department in their Best of Weddings as Brides' Choice (3rd consecutive year). In addition, the conservation staff was recognized by Solar Builder magazine, as Project of the Year, as a result of the solar panel array located on the north side of the zoo. The Ohio State House of Representatives also honored the Toledo Zoo as the #1 zoo in the state of Ohio.

2015 was another active year for the Toledo Zoo & Aquarium. Their Lights Before Christmas display was voted #2 best Zoo Lights Display in USA Today, as well as being named in the top 5 Most Beautiful Christmas Trees, for the decoration of their "Big Tree". The conservation team was awarded the Public Agency Native Landscape Award, and was named a standout in Ohio Tourism from Ohiotraveler.com The renovations on the Aquarium also received the 2015 Build Ohio Award

The Lights Before Christmas was named the #1 Zoo Lights Display in America by USA Today in 2016 and 2017.

The zoo received an award from the Ohio Department of Natural Resources Division of Wildlife with the 2017 Wildlife Diversity Conservation Award.

In 2018 The Toledo Zoo & Aquarium was named 7th on Ravereviews.com for having "weird animals" among 50 zoos in the US. The Aviary and staff were awarded the Avian Scientific Advisory Group Plume Award. The Lights Before Christmas "Big Tree" also was named one of the top ten travel-worthy Christmas trees to see. The Toledo Zoo & Aquarium has also received the highest rating possible from Charity Navigator.
