= Neighborhoods in Toledo, Ohio =

Neighborhoods of Toledo, Ohio are often of historic interest.

Commonly used indicators like South Toledo can be misleading, since these indicators are most likely based on the original plan of Downtown Toledo: North is really Northeast, South is really Southwest, West is really Northwest, and East is really Southeast

== Neighborhoods ==
- Arlington is a large neighborhood in south Toledo, bounded by Norfolk Southern Railway and Ohio State Route 25 on the east, Arlington Avenue and Swan Creek on the north, S. Byrne Road on the west, and Glendale Avenue on the south.
- Auburndale is a neighborhood in central-west Toledo, generally bounded by the Ottawa River and Interstate 475 on the north, U.S. Route 24 and Interstate 75 on the east, Ohio State Route 51 on the south and Auburn Avenue and S Cove Blvd on the west.
- Beverly is a quiet suburban-like neighborhood in south Toledo. It is bounded by Ohio State Route 25 on the east, U.S. Route 24 on the west, Glanzman Road on the south, Glendale Avenue on the north, and Norfolk Southern Railway on the northeast.
- Birmingham is a neighborhood on the east side of the Maumee River and separated from the rest of Toledo, along with several other neighborhoods such as Garfield, Ironville, and Navarre. Birmingham is bordered by Oregon, Ohio to the north, east and south. Additionally, it is bordered by Knox Street to the north, Interstate 280 to the southeast, and Consaul Stree to the south. Formerly the neighborhood was almost entirely made up of a large Hungarian enclave. It is famous for Tony Packo's.
- Crossgates: (South) features St. Peter's & St. Paul's Catholic School & Church on St. Claire Street, though now only the church is active, the School of St. Peter & Paul's, St. James Catholic School from Colburn St., merged with Immaculate Conception/Darby to keep a South-End Catholic School available to all Catholics living in the Old South End.
- DeVeaux: (West) It is a neighborhood that sits in west Toledo, with the borders outlined as Laskey Road to the north, Jackman Road to the west, Monroe Street to the south, and Secor Road to the east. It was developed primarily between the 1930s and the 1960s.
- Downtown: (Central) is an area of development, after many years of being largely considered to be a ghost town.
- Darby: A former Irish section of the Old South End. The Immaculate Conception Church of Darby forms its center extending to South Ave.
- East Toledo: (East) It is a large neighborhood on the east side of the Maumee River. East Toledo borders the neighborhood of Birmingham to the north, separated by I-280, and Oregon, Ohio, to the east, and Rossford, Ohio, to the south. The area was originally settled in the 1860s and previously contained a Bulgarian section.
- Englewood: Part of the Old West End. Generally bounded by W. Bancroft on the north, Lawrence Avenue on the east, Oakwood Avenue on the south and N. Detroit on the west.
- Five Points: (North/West) Designated because of the intersections of Sylvania Ave, Lewis Ave, Phillips Ave and Martha Dr.
- Franklin Park: (West) is a neighborhood located on the northwest side of the city, bordered by Michigan to the north, Secor Rd and part of Talmadge to the east, I-475 and part of Central Ave to the south, and Sylvania, Ohio, to the west. Annexed in the 1960s, development of this area began in the 1950s and continued into the 1980s, during which it saw a large increase in residents.
- Glendale-Heatherdowns (Byrne-Heatherdowns Village): Located in South Toledo, this area is an example of a classic post-WWII neighborhood. Curvilinear, tree-lined streets surround many parks.
- Harvard Terrace: (South Toledo) is a historic neighborhood along the Maumee River neighbored by the Toledo Zoo and Walbridge Park.
- Highland Heights: is a neighborhood, primarily in South Toledo, spanning from Dorr St at it northern border to the Anthony Wayne Trail along the southeastern border.
- Lagrange (The Polish Village): (Central/North) is a neighborhood formerly known for its almost exclusively Polish population; has an annual Polish festival.
- Library Village: (North/West) is a historic neighborhood featuring smaller and more affordable homes than some historic neighborhoods.
- North River (Central/North): Vistula, Toledo's first neighborhood, is part of the North River neighborhood.
- Old Orchard: (West) is a neighborhood neighboring the University of Toledo and Ottawa Hills.
- Old South End: (Central/South)
- Old Town: (Central)
- Old West End: (Central/West) is a collection of stately Victorian and Arts and Crafts architecture; The Old West End is on the National Register of Historic Places.
- ONYX: (Central) is a neighborhood that includes Lenk's Hill, a former German enclave, to the east and part of Kushwantz, a former Polish enclave, to the west.
- Point Place: (North) annexed in 1937, this neighborhood is surrounded by water: Maumee Bay, Maumee River, Ottawa River... but many of the homes are unremarkable likely because the area was prone to flooding before the dikes were put in.
- Reynolds Corners: (South/West) was annexed along with the remainder of Adams Township in 1966.
- Scott Park: (Central/West): The University of Toledo Scott Park Campus is located in this neighborhood. The eastern portion of this neighborhood was part of the former Polish enclave, Kushwantz.
- South Side: (South) A large expansive neighborhood with rough borders in south Toledo. Sometimes referred to as the Historic South End, this neighborhood has many homes built during the late nineteenth and early twentieth centuries in a large variety of architectural styles.
- Southwyck: (South):
- Vistula (North)
- Warehouse District: (Central) is a mix of in-use warehouses, lofts, restaurants, art studios, venues, etc. and has seen a huge renaissance within the last decade.
- Warren-Sherman: (Central): a former German enclave, now Mercy St. Vincent's Medical Center is the centerpiece of the neighborhood.
- Westgate: (West):
- Westmoreland: (West) is a historic neighborhood that is listed on the National Register of Historic Places.
- Whitmer-Trilby: (West) is a neighborhood in west Toledo whose borders consist of Michigan to the north, Ann Arbor railway to the west, Laskey Road to the south, and Secor Road to the east. Between the 1950s and 1960s, the area saw the majority of its housing development. The area was annexed by Toledo in the 1960s.
- Whitney Hills encompasses the area bounded approximately by the streets Jermain, Wellesley, Sagamore (formerly Floramond), Inwood, Appledore, The Glen, and North Cove Blvd.) The area was once owned by a Judge named Herbert Whitney, formed from his family's farmland. He was an influential member of Toledo society, education and church life, who lived with his wife Louise, in a large home on the corner of Inwood and The Glen. Judge Whitney's family farm was developed into Jermain Park and Ottawa Park, along with an area formed by a number of the most classic streets in the old city. By the 1960s Whitney Hills and surrounding neighborhoods had been developed into a large suburb that included McKinley Elementary School, which fed into DeVilbiss High School.
