= Nasby Building =

Coordinates: 41°39′08.0″N 83°32′14.5″W

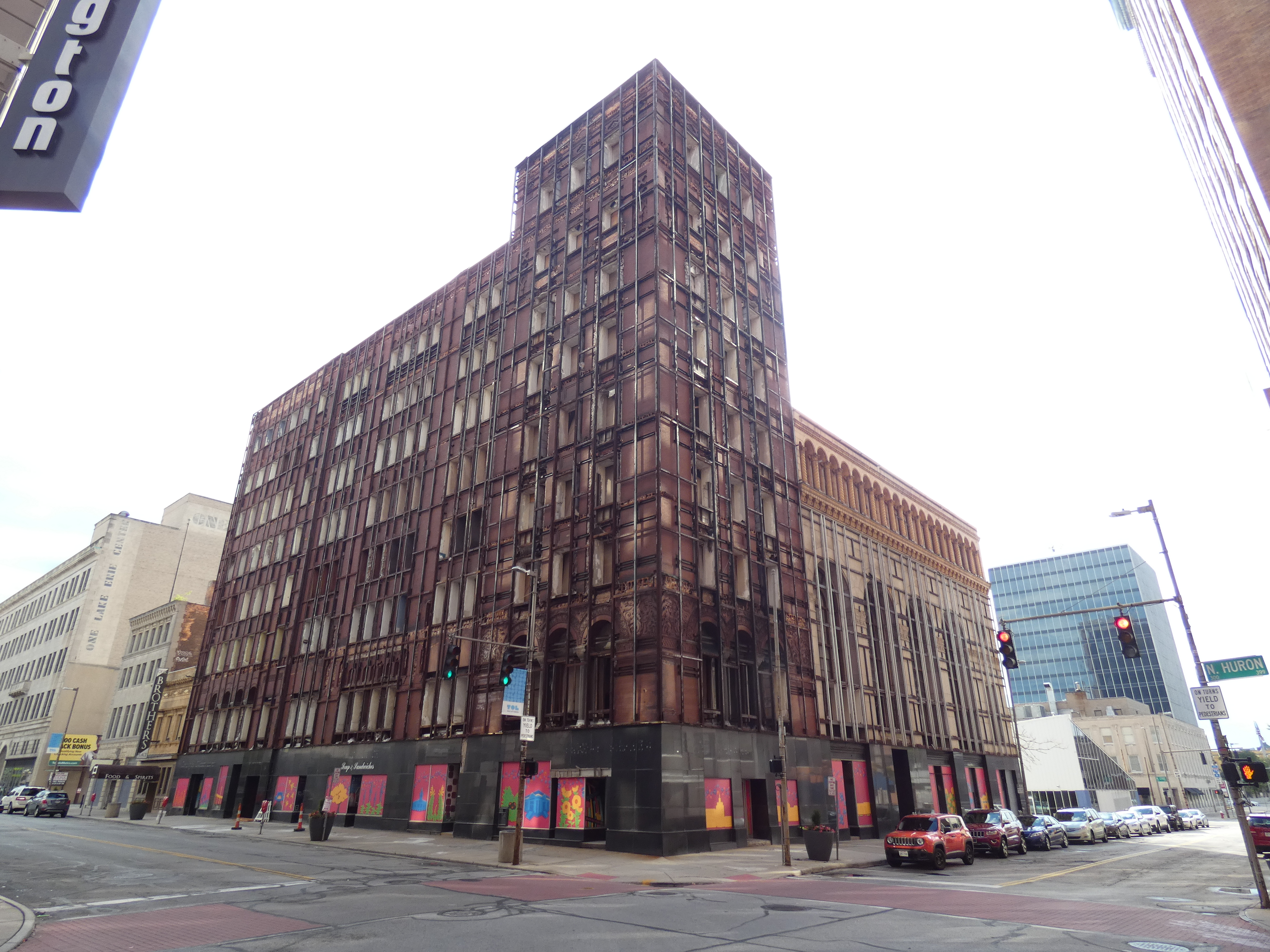
- Nasby Building in August 2022.
- Interactive map of the Nasby Building area

General information
- Type: office
- Location: 605 Madison Avenue, Toledo, Ohio
- Completed: 1891-1895

Height
- Architectural: 135 ft (41 m)
- Roof: 124 ft (38 m)

Technical details
- Floor count: 8

The Nasby Building is a 135 ft (41 m) tall high-rise building located at 605 Madison Avenue in Downtown Toledo. It stood as Toledo's tallest building for 11 years, from its completion in 1895 until the completion of the Nicholas Building in 1906.

It derives its name from Petroleum V. Nasby, the nom de plume of David Ross Locke, the longtime editor of the Toledo Blade and a nationally popular columnist during the Civil War and Reconstruction periods.

== History ==
The eight-story structure was constructed between 1891 and 1895 by the real estate man Horace Walbridge at the corner of Madison Avenue and Huron Street in Toledo's business center. The building was designed by Edward Fallis, a prominent Toledo architect, who maintained his offices in the building from 1894 until his death in 1927.

The design incorporated an eight-story office block which recalled the Chicago School of design with a taller Renaissance style tower located nearest the corner of Madison and Huron. The tower section of the building was said to be modeled after the Giralda in Seville, Spain in honor of the 400th anniversary of the discovery of America by Christopher Columbus.

The building was named the Nasby Building in 1895. The tower section included an ornate cupola which reached an architectural height of 187 feet (57 m) above the streets. The cupola was removed in the 1930s, which reduced the architectural height to 135 feet (41 m).

In the 1960s, the Nasby Building and the adjacent Wayne Building were covered with a facade of glass and enameled asbestos panels to give the appearance of a single structure. The four-story Wayne Building, was built as a bank in 1924 and contains a large and ornate bank lobby. The resurfaced structures were renamed the Madison Building.

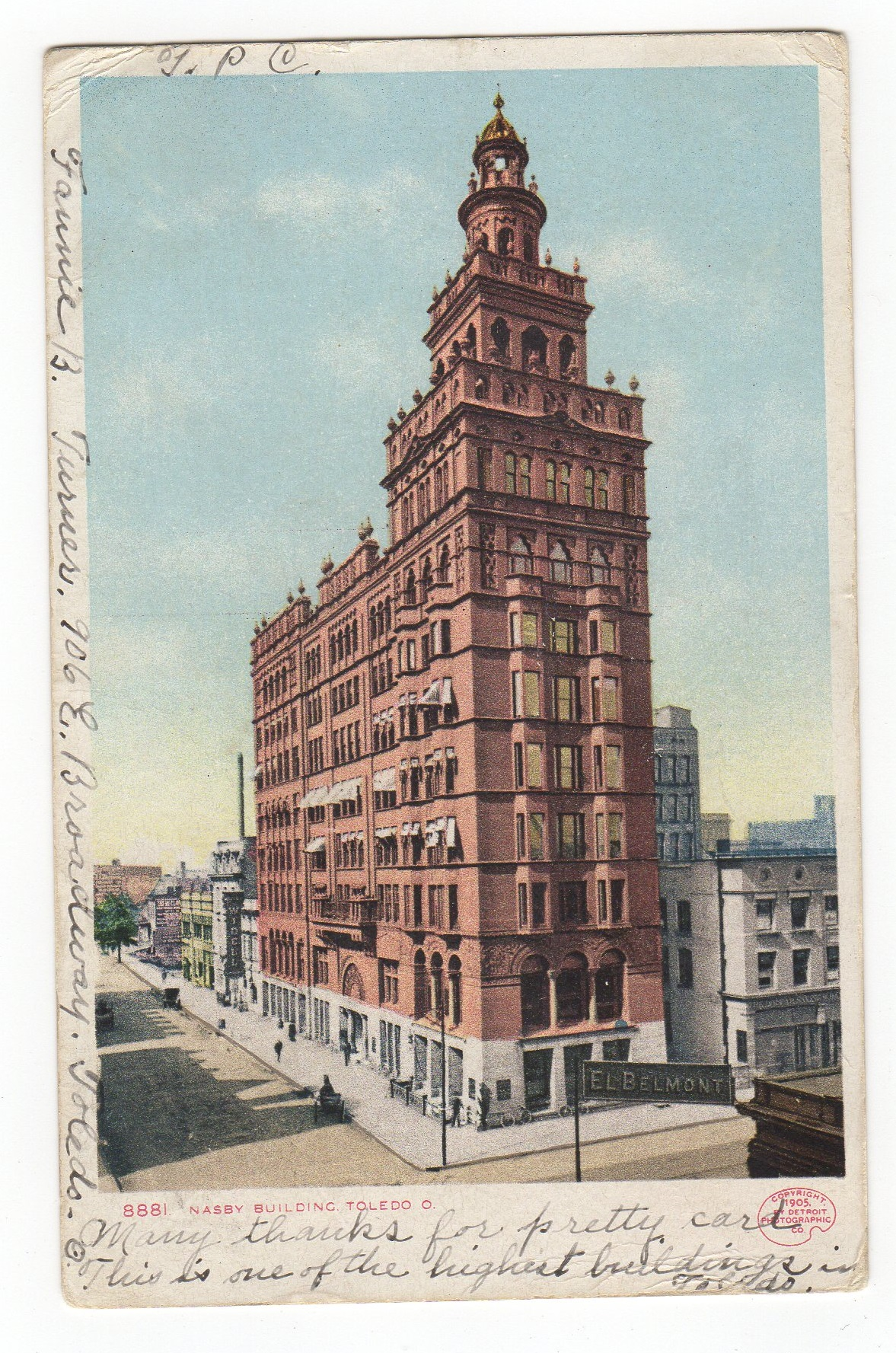
approximately 1900s

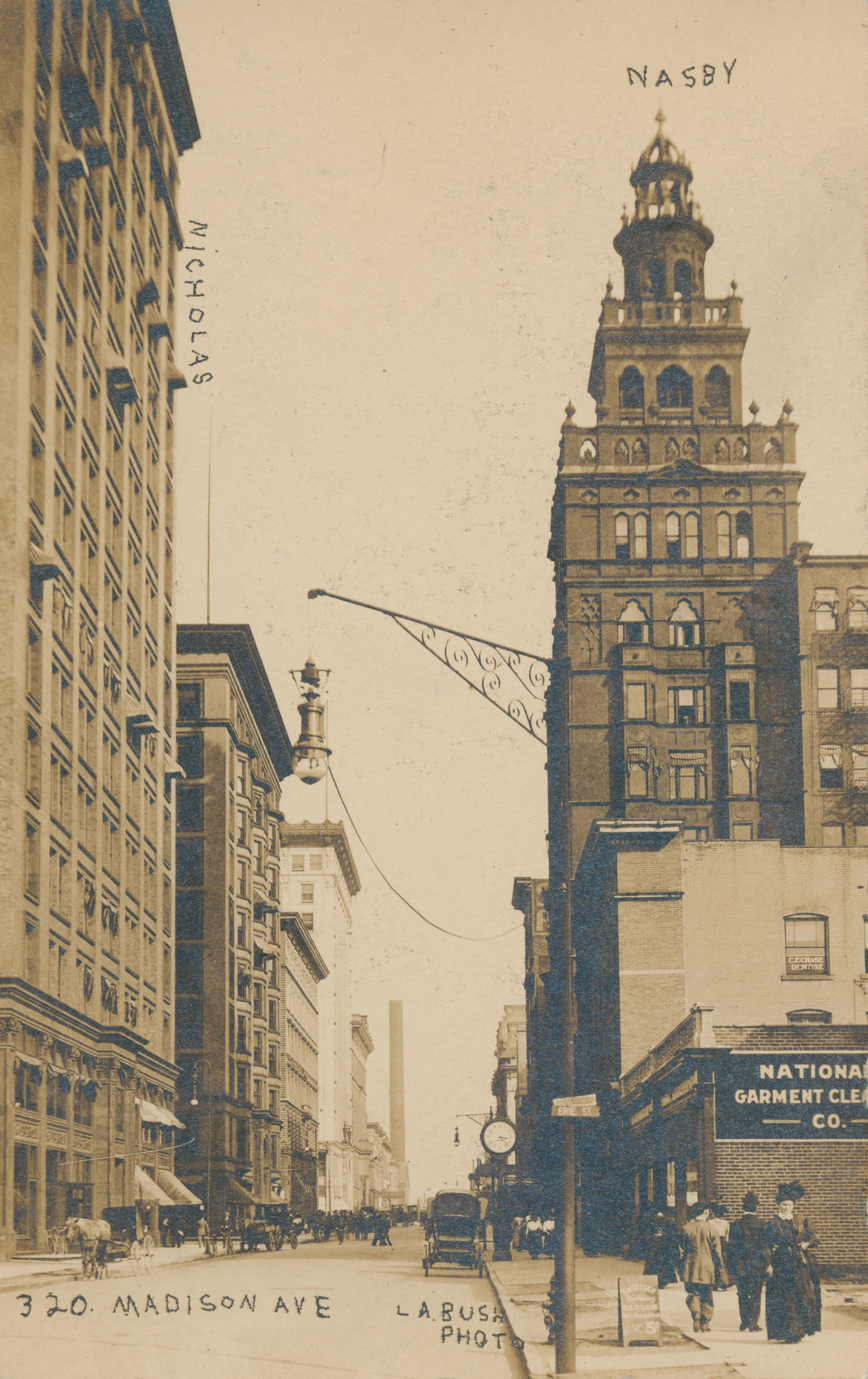
1908

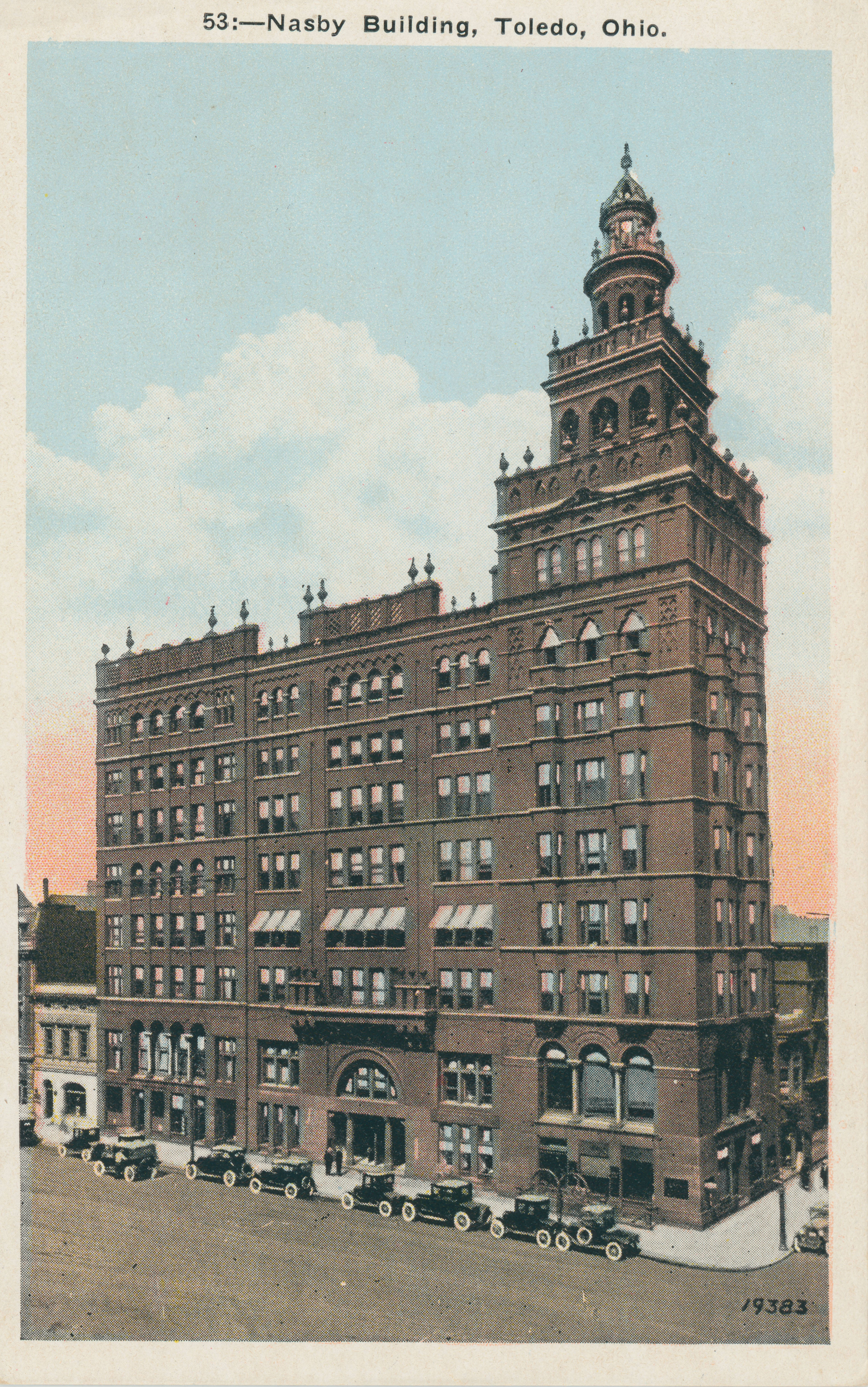
1900s

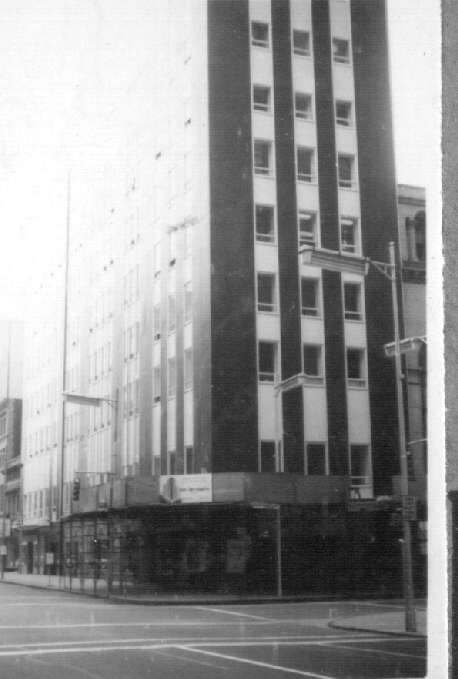
1965

== See also ==
- List of tallest buildings in Toledo, Ohio
