= Ottawa, Toledo, Ohio =

Coordinates: 41°40′00″N 83°36′00″W

Ottawa
- Neighborhood
- Interactive map of Ottawa
- Country: United States
- State: Ohio
- County: Lucas
- City: Toledo
- Settled: 1920s–1930s
- Named for: Ottawa Indians and Ottawa Park
- Time zone: UTC−5 (EST)
  - Summer (DST): UTC−4 (EDT)
- Area code(s): 419, 567
- Borders: North: Central Ave; South: Dorr Street; East: Upton/Monroe; West: Secor Road

Ottawa is a neighborhood in west central Toledo, Ohio, bordered by Secor Road to the West, Dorr Street to the South, Central Ave. to the North, and Upton and Monroe to the East and North. It derives its name from the Ottawa Indians that settled in the area in the early 18th century, as well as Ottawa Park, a prominent recreational area located within the community.

The district features historic neighborhoods such as Old Orchard, Indian Hills and Westmoreland. Old Orchard and Indian Hills are parallel to the Village of Ottawa Hills and have similar architectural styles and multi-level single-family homes. Westmoreland is bordered by Bancroft Street, Parkside Boulevard and Upton Ave. It is characterized by architectural styles ranging from Colonial to French, with rounded, undulating streets and open miniparks.

== History ==
In 1918, plans were made to move the Toledo Zoo from Walbridge Park to Ottawa Park, where it would "represent the finest and the third largest zoo in the United States." These plans, however, were never carried out.

Residents began to live in the area in the 1920s and 30s, as several wealthy residents began to venture outside the central city. The relocation of the University of Toledo to its current Bancroft Street location in 1931 cemented the neighborhood's identity as an area of education and leisure.

The migration of African-American residents to this area began in the early 1960s, with desegregation and improved job opportunities. Areas such as BUMA (Bancroft-Upton-Monroe) and Auburn-Delaware are predominantly black, and have a mix of middle and low-income earning residents.

== Recreation ==
Ottawa Park sits on 305 acres (1.23 km^{2}), bordered by Bancroft Street to the south, Douglas Road to the west, Kenwood Boulevard to the north, and Monroe Street/Ottawa Drive/Torrey Hill Dr to the East. It features a bike trail, 18-hole golf course, tennis courts, outdoor ice rink, a 19-hole disc golf course, picnic areas, jogging and nature trails, and playgrounds. The Ottawa Park Ice Rink is home to the Greater Toledo Inline Hockey League which is the cities premier inline hockey league.

Just across Monroe Street sits Jermain Park, named after Sylvanus Pierre Jermain, "the father of public golf in Toledo." Jermaine Park is much smaller than Ottawa Park and is mostly known for its tennis courts, where high school sectional matches are hosted year after year.

Close proximity to the University of Toledo, enables residents to take part in a host of recreational endeavors. The school's multi-million dollar Student Recreation Center, built in 1994, has swimming pools, basketball courts, tracks, and racquetball courts, amongst other facilities. It was also the first college recreation center to have a water slide. The school's football stadium, the Glass Bowl, is also host to football games played by the school's team, the Toledo Rockets, as well as various high school contests.

== Education ==
- Grove Patterson Academy
- McKinley Elementary
- Old Orchard Elementary School
- Robinson Elementary School
- St. Francis de Sales High School (Toledo, Ohio)
- Gesu School
