= List of tallest buildings and structures in Toledo, Ohio =

This list of tallest buildings in Toledo, Ohio ranks by height the high-rise buildings in the U.S. city of Toledo, Ohio. Toledo contains 21 high rise buildings of at least 50 meters (164 ft.) in height, with a further 10 buildings between 35 meters (115 ft.) and 50 meters in height.

The tallest structure in Toledo, Ohio is the Cleveland-Cliffs HBI Furnace Tower, which is an industrial vertical shaft furnace reaching a height of 139 meters (457 ft.) and is not designed for continuous residential or commercial occupancy. The 2nd tallest structure, and tallest occupied commercial building, is the 32-story, 125 meter (411 ft.) Fifth Third Center at One SeaGate on the downtown riverfront. The third tallest structure, and tallest residential building, is the Tower on the Maumee at 122 meters (400 ft.).

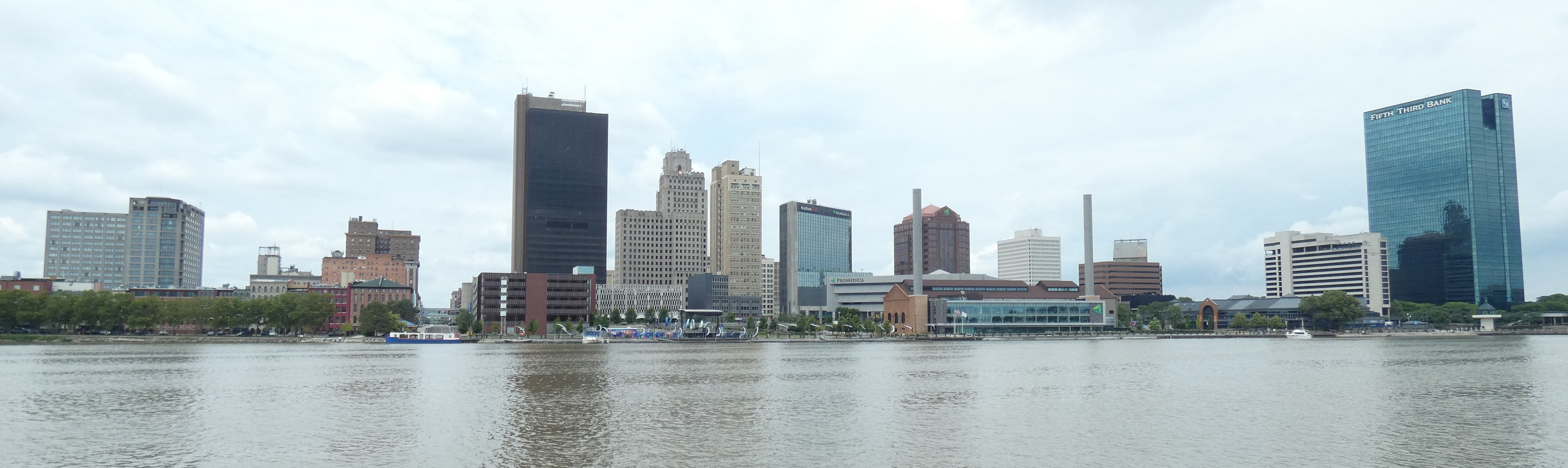
Downtown Toledo's skyline from across the Maumee River

== Tallest buildings ==
These are Toledo's buildings with an architectural height of more than 35 meters (115 feet):

Rank	Name	Image	Height feet / meters	Floors (Stories)	Year Completed	Notes
1	Cleveland-Cliffs HBI Furnace Tower		457 ft (139 m)	N/A	2020	Main Address: 300 Millard Avenue Industrial Structure, not designed for continuous occupancy.
2	Fifth Third Center at One SeaGate		411 ft (125 m)	32	1982	Main Address: 1 SeaGate; Commonly known as One SeaGate; Formerly: Owens-Illinois Building (1982-2006)
3	Tower on the Maumee		400 ft (120 m)	30	1969	Main Address: 200 North Saint Clair Street; Formerly: Fiberglas Tower (1969-1996)
4	PNC Bank Building		368 ft (112 m)	27	1930	Main Address: 405 Madison Avenue; Formerly: National City Bank Building (1992-2010); Formerly: Ohio Citizens Bank Building (1982-1992); Formerly: Owens-Illinois Building (1935-1981); Formerly: Ohio Bank Building (1930-1931)
5	Michael DiSalle Government Center		328 ft (100 m)	22	1982	Main Address: 1 Government Center; Commonly known as One Government Center
6	Riverfront Apartments		289 ft (88 m)	21	1913	Main Address: 245 North Summit Street formerly: Toledo Trust Building (1931-1982) formerly: Second National Bank Building (1913-1930)
7	ProMedica Senior Care Building		252 ft (77 m)	16	1989	Main Address: 333 North Summit Street formerly:KeyBank Tower (1990-1999) formerly:Summit Center (1989-1990)
8	The Nicholas Building		250 ft (76 m)	17	1906	Main Address: 608 Madison Avenue formerly: Fifth Third Center formerly: National Bank Building
9	Edison Plaza		230 ft (70 m)	16	1972	Main Address: 300 Madison Avenue
10	Generations Tower, The Toledo Hospital		227 ft (69 m)	13	2019	Main Address: 2142 N Cove Blvd
11	Commodore Perry Apartments		226 ft (69 m)	19	1927	Main Address: 505 Jefferson Avenue
12	Hylant Group Building		210 ft (64 m)	15	1960	Main Address: 811 Madison Avenue formerly: Pilkington Building formerly: Libbey Owens Ford (LOF) Building
13	University Hall, University of Toledo		205 ft (62 m)	4	1930	Main Address: 2801 West Bancroft Street
14	LaSalle Apartments		200 ft (61 m)	12	1927 &1917	Main Address: 513 Adams Street; Expansion in 1927 added 3 floors. Formerly: Lasalle, Koch and Company Department Store
15	Parks Tower, University of Toledo		198 ft (60 m)	16	1971	Main Address: 3025 South Glass Bowl Dr.
16	Hilton Garden Inn Toledo		195 ft (59 m)	17	1985	Main Address: 101 North Summit Street formerly: Radisson Hotel Toledo formerly: Park Inn Toledo
17	Renaissance Tower, The Toledo Hospital		186 ft (57 m)	10	2008	Main Address: 2142 N. Cove Blvd
18	Four SeaGate		184 ft (56 m)	10	1984	Main Address: 433 N Summit St
19	AT&T		180 ft (55 m)	10	1925	Main Address: 121 N Huron St formerly: OHIO BELL TELEPHONE CO
20	Ohio Building		178 ft (54 m)	12	1906	Main Address: 420 Madison Avenue
21	Lucas County Children Services		163 ft (50 m)	11	1976	Main Address: 705 Adams Street
22	Renaissance Toledo Downtown Hotel		161 ft (49 m)	13	1985	Main Address: 444 N. Summit St. formerly: 2 SeaGate, Grand Plaza, Wyndham Toledo, Crowne Plaza, Marriott, Sofitel
23	Huntington National Bank		149 ft (45 m)	10	1924	Main Address: 519 Madison Avenue; Formerly: United Savings Building, Home Building and Savings Co.
24	3130 Executive Pkwy		147 ft (45 m)	10	1974	Main Address: 3130 Executive Pkwy; Commonly known as Citizens National Bank building Formerly: Charter One Bank building
25	Executive Towers		142 ft (43 m)	13	1957	Main Address: 1920 Collingwood Boulevard
26	Secor Building		141 ft (43 m)	10	1908	Main Address: 425 Jefferson Ave; Formerly: Hotel Secor
27	Spitzer Building		139 ft (42 m)	10	1896	Main Address: 520 Madison Avenue
28	Nasby Building		135 ft (41 m)	8	1895	Main Address: 605 Madison Avenue; Also known as the Madison Building, the cupola was removed in 1930s reducing the architectural height from 187 feet to 135 feet.
29	Standart Lofts		122 ft (37 m)	7	1900	Main Address: 34 S Erie Street
30	Pythian Castle		122 ft (37 m)	6	1890	Main Address: 801 Jefferson Avenue
31	The Commerce Paper Company		115 ft (35 m)	8	1912	Main Address: 15-23 S Ontario Street

== Tallest destroyed or demolished ==
This table lists buildings in Toledo that were destroyed or demolished and at one time stood at least 115 feet (35 m) in height.

Name	Image	Height ft (m)	Floors	Completed in	Destroyed in	Notes
Hotel SeaGate		187 ft (57 m)	19	1975	2021	Deconstructed to make room for a pocket park.
Clarion Hotel Toledo		140 ft (43 m)	11	1974	2014	Land now occupied by the IUOE Local 18 and a credit union.

== Timeline of tallest buildings ==
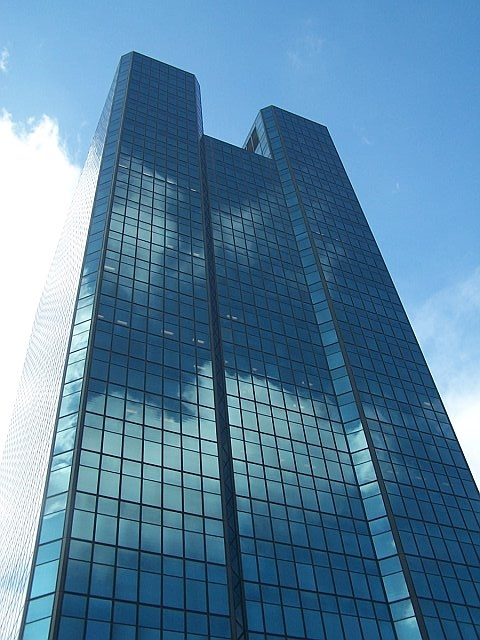
The Fifth Third Center at One SeaGate stood as the tallest building in Toledo from 1982 to 2020.

This lists buildings that once held the title of tallest in Toledo.

Name	Street address	Years as tallest	Height ft / m	Floors
Salem Lutheran Church	1127 N Huron Street	1870–1877		N/A
First Congregational Church	St. Clair Street	1877–1891	170 / 52 (est)	N/A
Nasby Building	Madison Av & Huron St	1891–1906	187 / 57	8
The Nicholas Building	608 Madison Avenue	1906–1913	250 / 76	17
Riverfront Apartments	245 N Summit Street	1913–1930	289 / 88	23
PNC Bank Building	405 Madison Avenue	1930–1969	368 / 112	27
Tower on the Maumee	200 N St. Clair Street	1969–1982	400 / 122	30
Fifth Third Center at One SeaGate	1 Seagate	1982–2020	411 / 125	32
Cleveland-Cliffs HBI Furnace Tower	330 Millard Avenue	2020–present	457 / 139	N/A

== See also ==
- List of tallest buildings in Ohio
- List of tallest buildings in Cincinnati
- List of tallest buildings in Cleveland
- List of tallest buildings in Columbus
