= The Nicholas Building (Toledo, Ohio) =

Nicholas Building
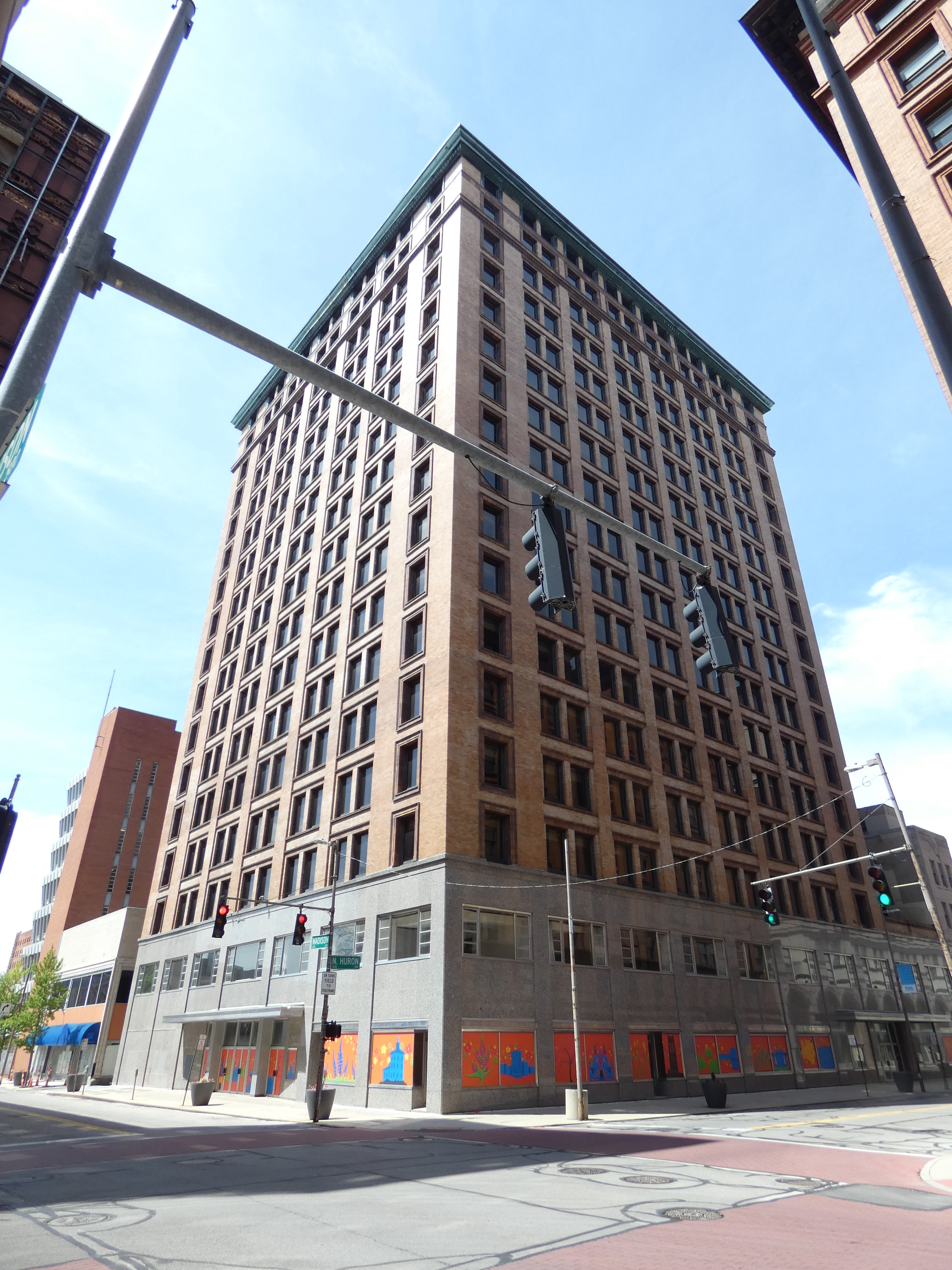
- Nicholas Building in 2022

General information
- Type: office
- Location: 608 Madison Avenue, Toledo, Ohio
- Coordinates: 41.653°N 83.537°W
- Completed: 1906

Height
- Architectural: 250 ft (76 m)

Technical details
- Floor count: 17

The Nicholas Building is a 250 ft (76 m) tall high-rise building located at 608 Madison Avenue in Downtown Toledo. It stood as Toledo's tallest building for 7 years, from its completion in 1906 until the completion of the Riverfront Apartments building in 1913. The Nicholas Building is currently the seventh-tallest building in Toledo.

== History ==
The seventeen story structure was constructed in 1906 by Toledo business partners A.L. Spitzer and C.M. Spitzer. The Spitzer cousins named the building after their grandfather, Nicholas Spitzer. The building was designed by Norval Bacon and Thomas Huber, partners of the Toledo architectural firm of Bacon & Huber. The Nicholas Building was described in 1910 as one of the "largest and most modern office buildings in the Northwest", the area known today as the East North Central States.

The building was extensively remodeled and occupied by the National Bank of Toledo starting in 1954, and continuing after the bank's 1989 acquisition by Fifth Third Bank. Fifth-Third would remain the primary tenant of the Nichols Building until the bank's 2007 move to One SeaGate

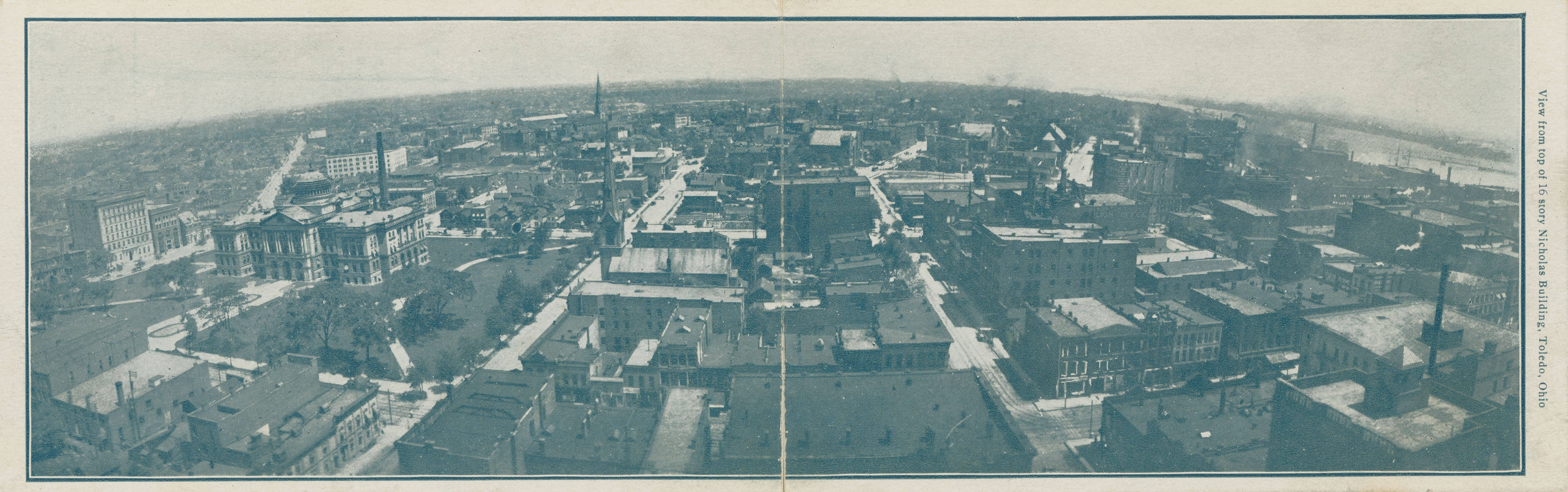
View from the Nicholas Building, undated

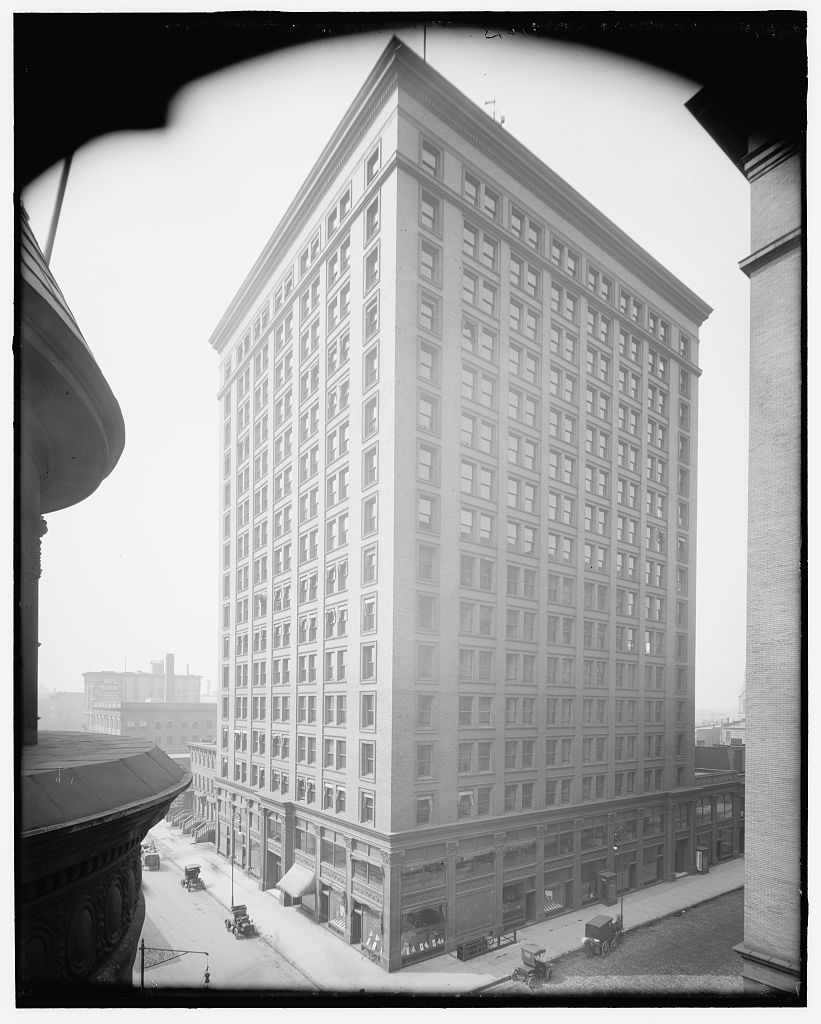
Nicholas Building circa 1910

== See also ==
- List of tallest buildings in Toledo, Ohio
