= Riverfront Apartments =

Edge21 Apartments
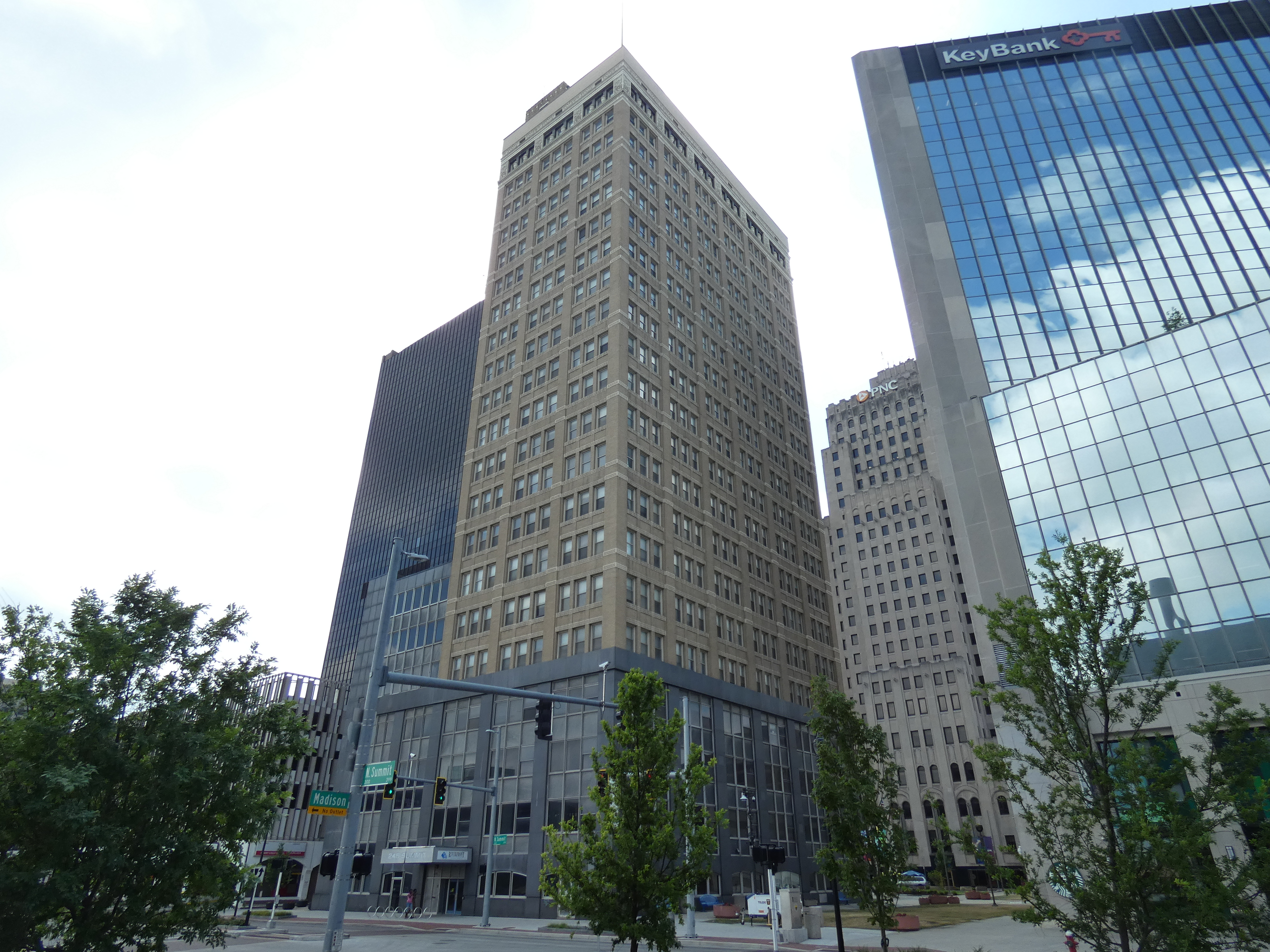
- Edge 21 Apartments formally the Riverfront Apartments in 2022
- Interactive map of the Edge21 Apartments area
- Former names: Riverfront Apartments

General information
- Type: residential
- Location: Downtown Toledo, 245 N Summit Street Toledo, Ohio 43604, Lucas County, Ohio
- Coordinates: 41°39′3.4″N 83°32′3.3″W
- Current tenants: ProMedica Federal Credit Union
- Completed: 1913
- Owner: Edge 21, LLC
- Landlord: DMG Rentals

Height
- Architectural: 289 ft (88 m)

Technical details
- Floor count: 21
- Lifts/elevators: 4

Other information
- Number of units: 113
- Facilities: Laundry & Fitness Center
- Parking: Covered Deck Parking
- Public transit access: "Bus. Toledo Area Regional Transit Authority

Website
- edge21apts.com

The Edge21 Apartments is a 289 ft (88 m) tall high-rise building located at 245 North Summit Street in Downtown Toledo. It stood as Toledo's tallest building for 17 years, from its completion in 1913 until the completion of the PNC Bank Building in 1930. The Edge21 Apartments building is currently the fifth-tallest building in Toledo.

== History ==
The twenty-one story structure was constructed in 1912-13 for the Second National Bank on the southwest corner of Summit Street and Madison Avenue in Toledo's business center. The bank planned to occupy the lower floors and the upper floors were designed as office space. The general contractor for the building was The A. Bentley & Sons Company, Toledo, Ohio, and the architects are D. H. Burnham & Company, of Chicago, Ill.

The building was originally known as the Second National Bank Building from the time of its construction in 1913 until the bank merged with Toledo Trust. From the 1930s until 1981 the building was the headquarters of the Toledo Trust bank and it was known as the Toledo Trust Building. The local bank moved its headquarters across Summit Street into its new triangular-shaped granite and glass building in 1981.

The old Toledo Trust building was purchased in 1998 by the Eyde Co., in a $4.5 million package deal that included the Tower on the Maumee and the adjacent parking garage. The office building was converted to apartments in 1999 and renamed the Riverfront Apartments.

In January 2023 the Riverfront Apartments were purchased from Geyde Riverfront, LLC by Edge 21, LLC and renamed Edge21 Apartments. The property is currently managed by DMG Rentals.

== See also ==
- List of tallest buildings in Toledo, Ohio
