= Old Orchard (Toledo, Ohio) =

Neighborhood of Toledo, Ohio

Coordinates: 41°40′15″N 83°36′57″W

- Neighborhood
- Interactive map of Old Orchard
- Country: United States
- State: Ohio
- County: Lucas
- City: Toledo
- Developed: 1920s
- Founder: B.C. Bowen Co.
- Named for: Large orchards that existed prior to development
- Time zone: UTC−5 (EST)
  - Summer (DST): UTC−4 (EDT)
- Area code(s): 419, 567
- Borders: North: Central Avenue; South: Bancroft Street; East: Douglas Road; West: Secor Road
- Adjacent to: University of Toledo (south); Ottawa Hills (west)
- Main boulevard: Kenwood Boulevard
- Architectural style: English Tudor (1920s)
- Notable residents: Millie Benson; Wade Kapszukiewicz

Old Orchard is a neighborhood in Toledo, Ohio that is roughly bordered by Bancroft Street, Secor Road, Central Avenue and Douglas Road, and is bordered by the University of Toledo to the south and the village of Ottawa Hills to the west.

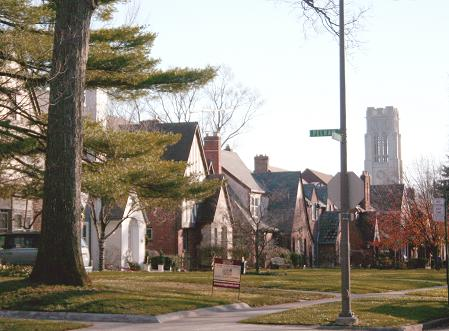
Street in Old Orchard

== History ==
The neighborhood derives its name from the large orchards that existed on the land prior to being developed in the 1920s. It was developed by the B.C. Bowen Co. (one of the founders of the present day Welles-Bowen Realty Company) who is credited with selecting the Old Orchard name. Accounts tell of a large apple orchard near the corner of Densmore and Bancroft and a peach orchard near Pemberton and Middlesex. Mr. Bowen is also credited with selecting the English-sounding street names, although no information exists as to why. One potential explanation is that Mr. Bowen had also developed the Westmoreland neighborhood (about 1 mile east of Old Orchard) around 1917 and selected those street names from areas in Virginia (Mount Vernon, Richmond, Potomac), as the rolling terrain reminded him of that part of the country. This strategy of using quaint street names probably carried over to his next project, Old Orchard.

Streets in Old Orchard are platted in a simple grid pattern with several ending with a small triangular grassy island at the terminus. These can be found at the Pemberton/Kenwood and Barrington/Kenwood intersections as well as the Hopewell/Meadowwood, Hopewell/Densmore, Pemberton/Darlington and Barrington/Darlington intersections. These triangular islands nicely complement the boulevard on Kenwood. Additional islands once existed at most of the Bancroft intersections but were removed at some point.

Old Orchard is bisected from east to west by Kenwood Boulevard, a landscaped boulevard. Kenwood is fronted by many stately homes which are generally larger than most in the neighborhood. Many homes in Old Orchard are brick and in the English Tudor style, further relating to the English street names. This architectural style, popular in the 1920s, fits well with the Gothic styled University of Toledo which sits on its southern edge and was built at about the same time (University Hall was constructed in 1931). Street names in Old Orchard include Aldringham, Cheltenham, Goddard, Drummond, Meadowwood, Barrington, Middlesex, Pemberton, Densmore, Markway, Hughes, Christie, Kenwood, Hopewell, Darlington, Pelham and Brantford.

== Residents ==
The neighborhood is home to many university professors, lawyers and other professionals, and includes many families. Old Orchard is very walkable. On the northern edge, one can walk easily to the Westgate shopping center (Costco, Fresh Market, Starbucks), Cricket West shopping center, Kenwood Shopping Center and the Sanger branch of the public library.

== Notable residents ==
One of Old Orchard's more famous residents was Millie Benson (1905 - 2002) who was one of the original ghost writers of the Nancy Drew Mystery books penned under the name Carolyn Keene. She wrote 23 of the original 30 books first published. In 2001, Benson received a Special Edgar Award for her contributions to the Nancy Drew series. She was also a columnist for the Toledo Blade and the Toledo Times.

Toledo's current mayor, Wade Kapszukiewicz, is also a member of the Old Orchard community.

== Neighborhood Sites of Interest ==
- University of Toledo
