= Harvard Terrace =

Neighborhood of Toledo, Ohio

Coordinates: 41°36′52″N 83°35′20″W

- Historic Neighborhood
- Interactive map of Harvard Terrace
- Country: United States
- State: Ohio
- County: Lucas
- City: Toledo
- Platted: 1902
- Founded by: E. H. Close and George E. Pomeroy
- Time zone: UTC−5 (EST)
  - Summer (DST): UTC−4 (EDT)
- Area code(s): 419, 567
- Borders: North: Amherst Drive; South: Glendale Avenue; East: Broadway; West: Anthony Wayne Trail
- Housing units: 435 residences
- Architectural styles: Arts and Crafts, Bungalow, Prairie, Colonial/Georgian Revival
- School district: Toledo Public Schools

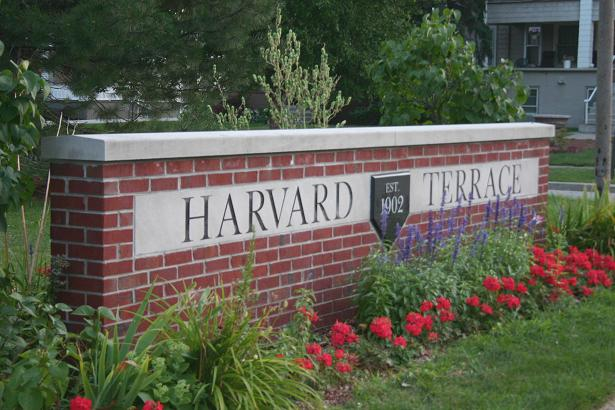
Harvard Terrace Sign

Examples of Harvard Terrace architecture.

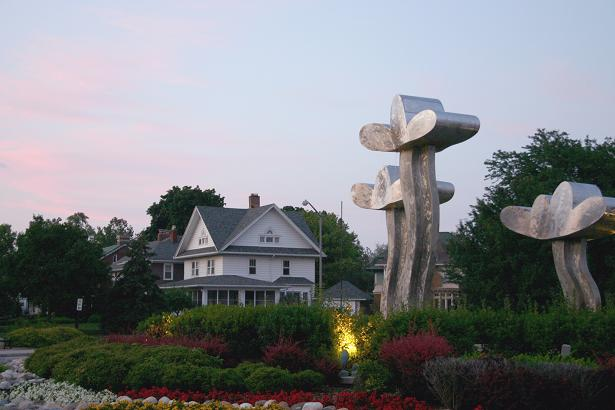
Harvard Circle facing NW

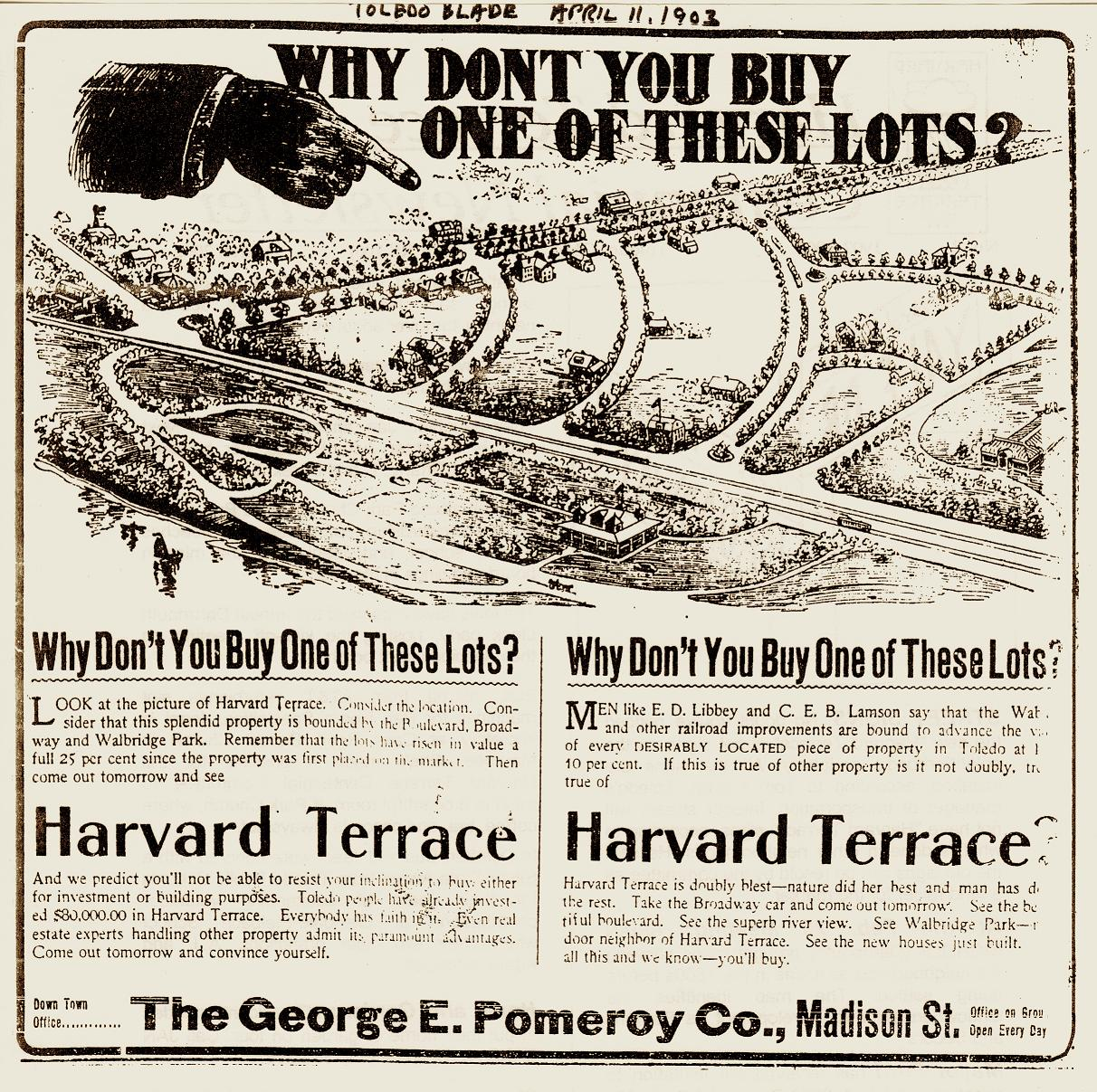
Ad for Harvard Terrace 1903

Harvard Terrace is a historic neighborhood in Toledo, Ohio; it is "bordered by Amherst Drive (which abuts the Toledo Zoo), Broadway, Glendale Avenue, and the Anthony Wayne Trail. It includes 435 residences, many of them designed by architects and built in the early 1900s."

While partnered with George E. Pomeroy of the George E Pomeroy Co., E. H. Close developed the Harvard Terrace Neighborhood of Toledo, Ohio; later, in 1909, Close founded the E. H. Close Realty Company and went on to develop many areas in and around Toledo, including Ottawa Hills.

Harvard Terrace is doubly blest—nature did her best and man has done the rest. Take the Broadway car and come out tomorrow. See the beautiful boulevard. See the superb river view. See Walbridge Park—next door of Harvard Terrace ...

— Ad: The George E. Pomeroy Co.: The Blade (Toledo), 1903 (1)

A historical review specialist for the Department of Neighborhoods conducted a survey of the neighborhood. He found that it was platted in 1902. One house was built in 1895; 100 houses were built by 1910; and most of the houses were built by 1925. There were seven architectural styles identified including Arts and Crafts, Bungalow, Prairie, and Colonial/ Georgian Revival.

== Neighborhood attractions ==
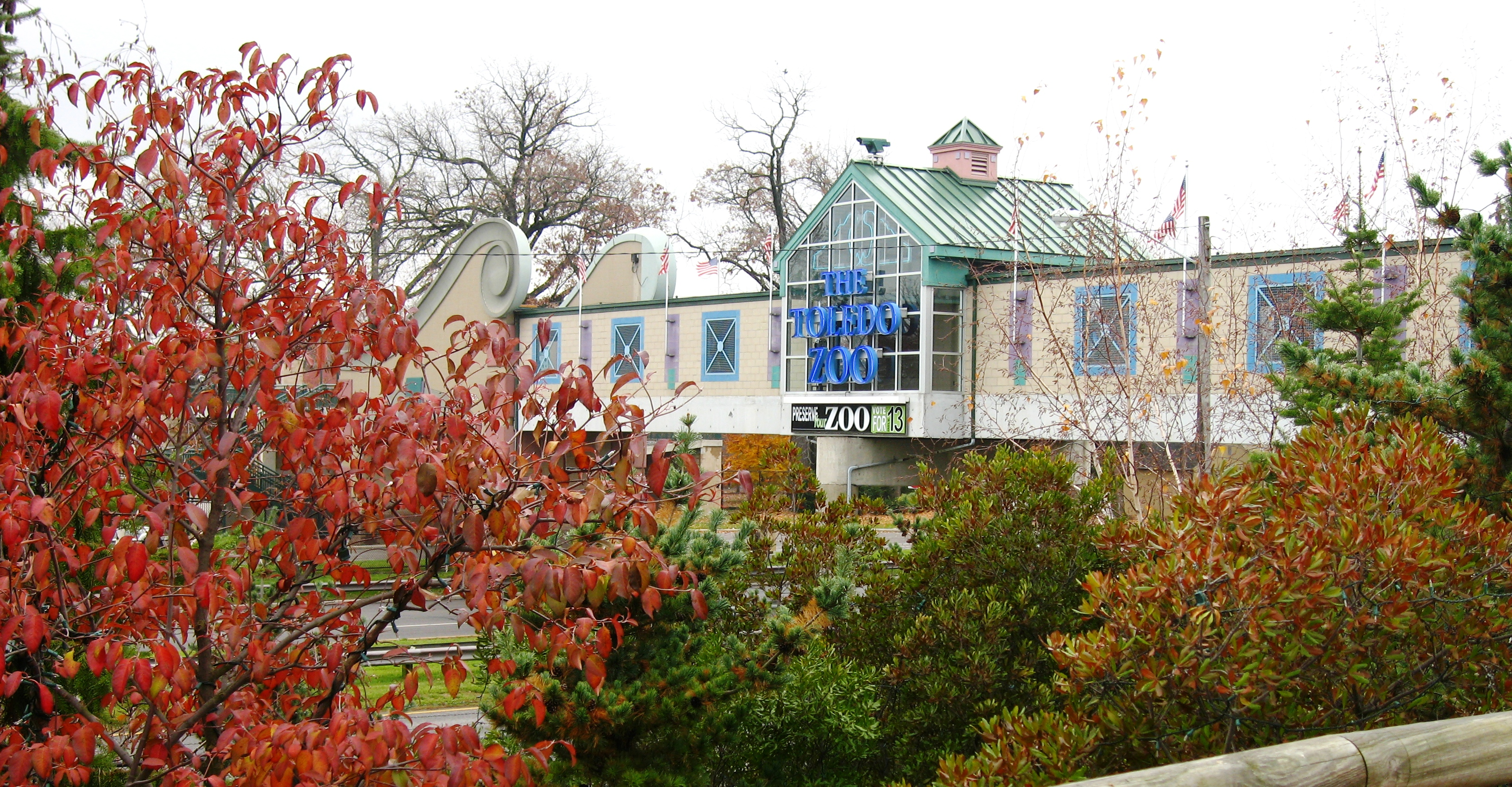
The Toledo Zoo

- Maumee River
- Toledo Zoo
- Walbridge Park

== Neighborhood clubs and organizations ==
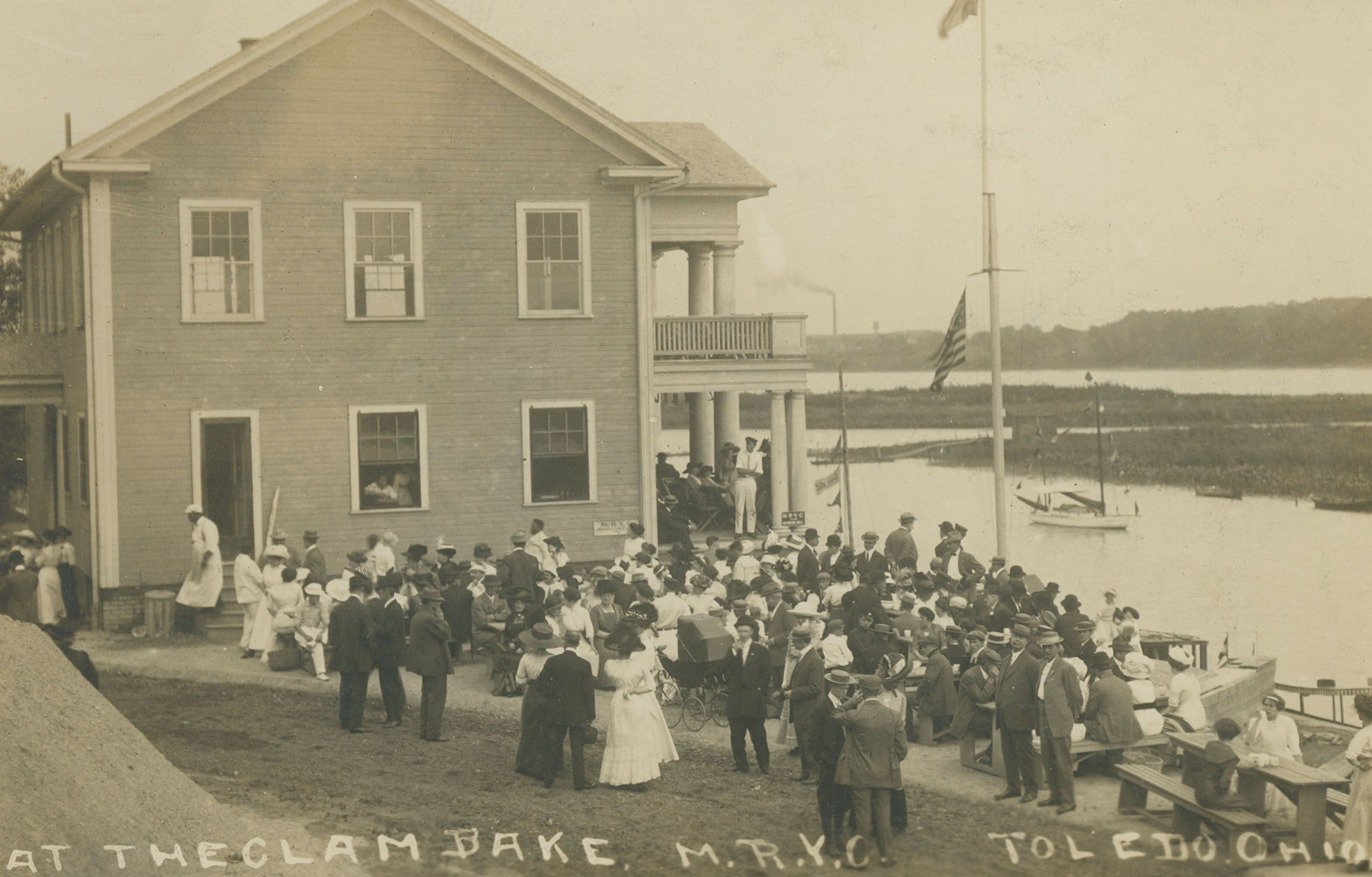
Clam Bake, Maumee River Yacht Club, Toledo, Ohio

- Maumee River Yacht Club (MRYC)
- Toledo Sailing Club (TSC)

== Public education ==
Harvard Terrace is in the Toledo Public School District and the neighborhood students go to Harvard Elementary and Bowsher High School.
