= Riverfront (disambiguation) =

Riverfront is a region along a river.

Riverfront may also refer to:

- Riverfront (Miami), urban development in Downtown Miami, Florida, United States
- Riverfront Apartments, high-rise building in Downtown Toledo, Idaho, United States
- Riverfront Plaza, twin-tower office building complex in the downtown area of Richmond, Virginia, United States
- Riverfront Stadium, multi-purpose stadium in Cincinnati, Ohio, United States (1970–2002)
- Riverfront Towers, apartment and condominium complex in Downtown Detroit, Michigan, United States
