= The Village Voice of Ottawa Hills =

Print news magazine

The Village Voice
- Editors: Tony Bassett, Yarko Kuk
- Categories: Newsmagazine
- Frequency: Monthly
- Paid circulation: 1,100
- Unpaid circulation: 100
- Total circulation (2007): 1,200
- First issue: 1974
- Company: Village Voice Publishing
- Country: United States
- Language: English
- Website: www.vvoh.com
- ISSN: 2156-2199

The Village Voice of Ottawa Hills (or The Village Voice) is a monthly community newsmagazine that serves the village of Ottawa Hills, Ohio a suburb of Toledo. With over 1,200 subscribers, the paper reports a readership of nearly 3,000 people.

== Features ==
In addition to monthly news and feature stories, the paper also has a number of popular listings and columns, including the "Police Beat", "Villagers in the News", the "Great Outdoors", "Voices of the Past", "Greener Living", and "Focus on Schools".

== History ==
In the May 1974, Mary Morris and Lynn Rubini published the first, four page issue of The Village Voice. For a year, the two women produced 11 more issues. After Rubini no longer had time to work on the magazine, Sharon F. Simmons became both the editor and the publisher, and put out her first issue with the help of associate editor Russ Galbraith in September, 1975. By the early 1980s, the paper had grown to be around 32 pages a month when Ron L. Coffman became the associate editor.

After 30 years as editor/publisher, Simmons sold the newspaper to Village Voice Publishing, Ltd., an Ohio Limited Liability Company, in January, 2005. The company's creators, Tony Bassett and Yarko Kuk, became co-editors, and published a digitally-produced edition March, 2005. By the next month, the use of spot color was used in the paper, and, two months after that, the CMYK color model was introduced. The monthly publication now ranges in size from 28 to 44 pages.
