= Sculpture in the Park =

Sculpture garden in Ohio, United States

Coordinates: 41.6629°N 83.6238°W

- The garden is easily visible from the street.
- Interactive map of Sculpture in the Park
- Type: Sculpture garden
- Location: Ottawa Hills, Ohio, USA
- Created: 2004
- Operator: The Ottawa Hills Foundation

Sculpture in the Park is a non-profit sculpture garden on "Arrowhead Point" in eastern Ottawa Hills, Ohio, at the five-way intersection of Secor Road, Bancroft Street, and Indian Road. All of the sculptures are large enough "to be easily visible from the street", and there is a great deal of variety. The sculptures get much exposure at this location, since "thousands of cars pass by... daily."

== History ==

Peggy Grant got an idea for the sculptures while driving the empty grass area one day. Although it was originally planned for there to be 10 sculptures in the garden in the summer of 2004, The Ottawa Hills Foundation, which sponsors the exhibit, decided to only start out with six. Although many sculptures come and go, the Ottawa Hills Foundation purchased three to permanently stay in the garden, including the butterfly sculpture, which is a tribute to former Ottawa Hills mayor, Jean Youngen, who died in 2004.
