= Library Village (Toledo, Ohio) =

- Historic Neighborhood
- Interactive map of Library Village
- Coordinates: 41°41′35″N 83°34′22″W
- Country: United States
- State: Ohio
- County: Lucas
- City: Toledo
- Named for: West Toledo Branch Library
- Time zone: UTC−5 (EST)
  - Summer (DST): UTC−4 (EDT)
- Area code(s): 419, 567
- Major streets: Sylvania Avenue; Willys Parkway
- Notable landmark: West Toledo Branch Library (1930)

Library Village is one of many historic neighborhoods in Toledo, Ohio. The neighborhood is named for the historic West Toledo Branch Library, located just off Sylvania Avenue at Willys Parkway.

West Toledo Branch Library is a community hub located at 1320 W Sylvania Ave, Toledo, OH 43612, serving as a central resource for residents of the area, including access to books, technology, programs and meeting spaces. The library is part of the Toledo Lucas County Public Library (TLCPL) system and is affectionately known as "Library Village" due to its deep integration with the neighborhood. It opened in its present building in 1930. In 2001 the branch remodeled and expanded.

== Gallery ==
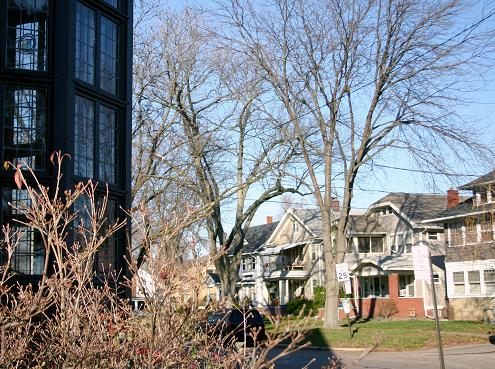
Willys Parkway by library

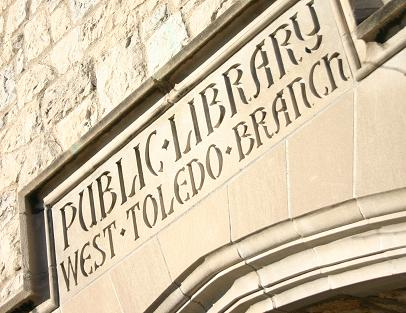
Historic West Branch sign

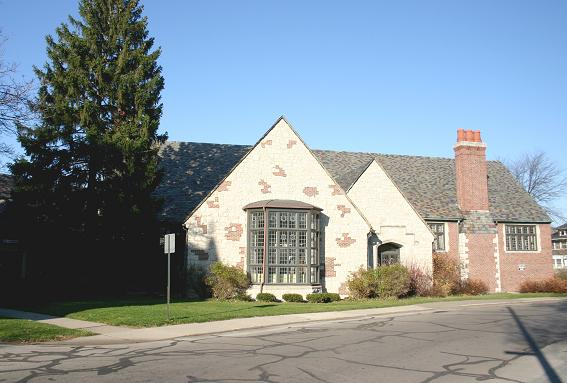
Historic West Branch
