= E. H. Close Realty Company =

E.H. Close Realty Company
- Industry: Real estate
- Founded: 1909; 116 years ago
- Founder: E.H. Close
- Headquarters: Toledo, Ohio, United States

In 1909, after E. H. Close left the George E. Pomeroy Company, he established the E. H. Close Company. Close had played a significant part in what was then suburban development in and around Toledo, Ohio; these developments included most notably Harvard Terrace and Ottawa Hills, but also the lesser known developments of Halsted Heights, Hillcrest Gardens, Homewood Park, Home Acres, and others.

The day of cramped, crowded city lots is passing
and the movement toward the suburbs
is more pronounced now.

— E. H. Close, 1910
