= Valentine Theatre =

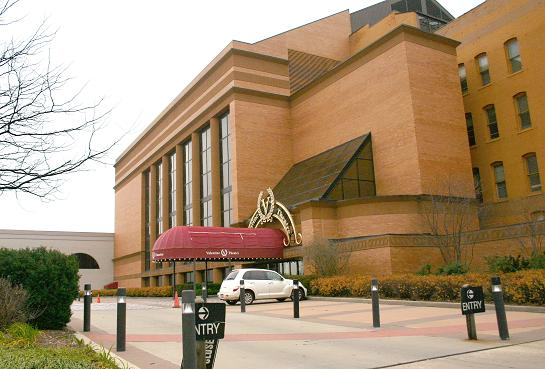
- Interactive map of Valentine Theatre
- Address: 410 Adams Street; Toledo, Ohio; United States
- Coordinates: 41.6528°N 83.5342°W
- Owner: Toledo Cultural Arts Center
- Operator: Toledo Cultural Arts Center, Inc
- Capacity: 901

Construction
- Opened: December 25, 1895
- Reopened: October 9, 1999
- Architect: E.O. Fallis

Website
- www.valentinetheatre.com

The Valentine Theatre is located in the downtown district of Toledo, Ohio, at the corner of Superior and Adams Streets. The 130-year-old facility seats 901.

From 1925 to approximately 1928 The Toledo Society for the Blind (Now the Sight Center of Northwest Ohio) rented space there for their operations. It was there that a piano and victrola were donated and they were able to start a dancing class.

The building was added to the National Register of Historic Places on May 19, 1987. A $28 million renovation of the building carried out by architect Charles H. Stark, begun in 1978 and taking 21 years to complete, was unveiled on October 9, 1999.

On November 23, 2007, a natural gas explosion in the basement caused extensive damage and forced the evacuation of the adjoining Renaissance Senior Apartments. The theater reopened in April 2008 after repairs costing $3.5 million.

== Groups in residence ==
- Toledo Symphony Orchestra
- Toledo Opera
- Toledo Ballet
- Toledo Jazz Society
- Toledo Jazz Orchestra
- Toledo Masterworks Chorale
- Toledo Repertory Theatre
