= Michael DiSalle Government Center =

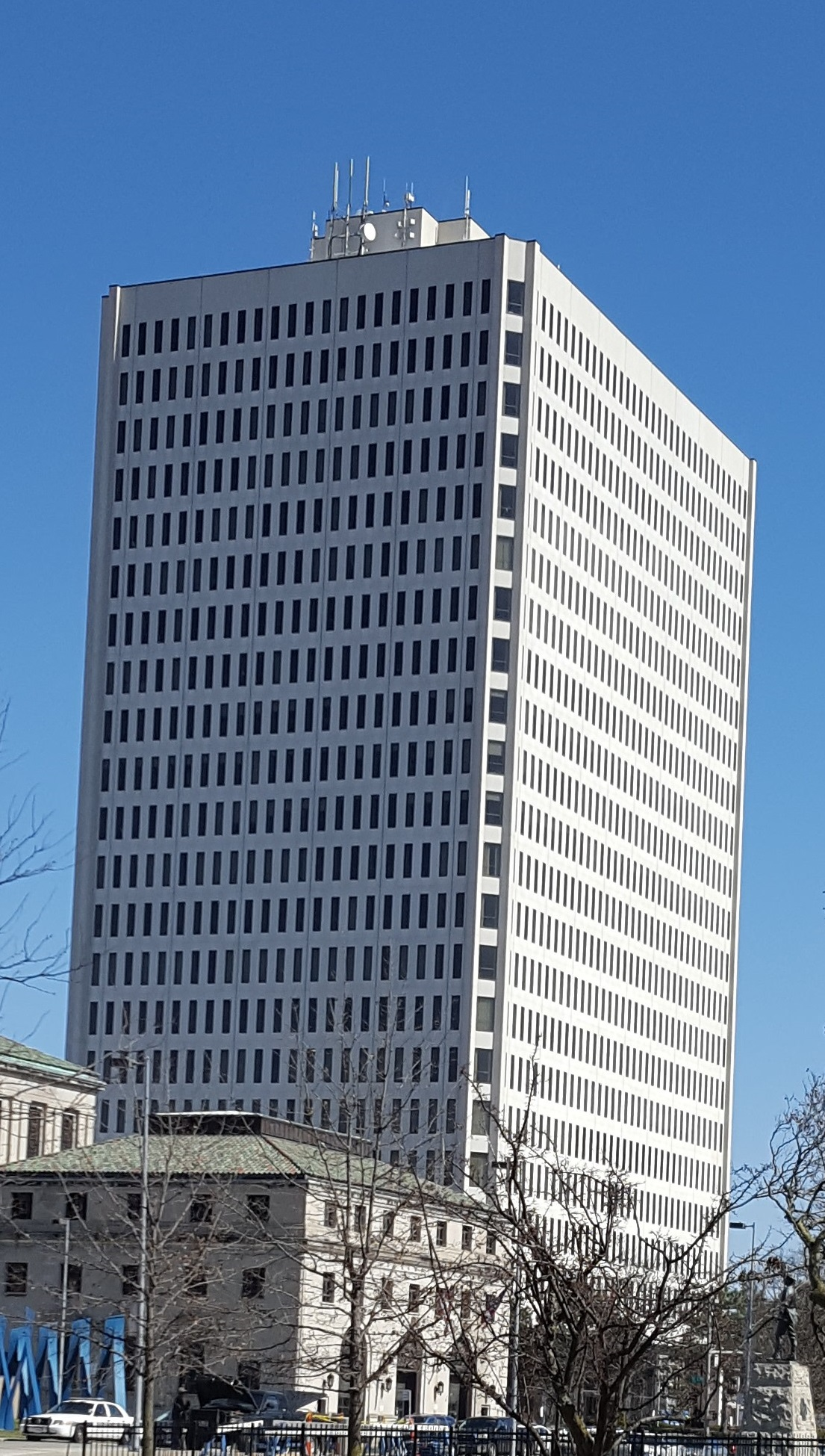
- Michael DiSalle Government Center
- Interactive map of the Michael DiSalle Government Center area

General information
- Type: governmental office
- Location: 1 Government Center, Toledo, Ohio
- Coordinates: 41°39′12″N 83°31′50″W
- Construction started: 1981
- Completed: 1982
- Cost: $61 million
- Owner: Minoru Yamasaki & Associates

Height
- Roof: 327 ft (100 m)

Technical details
- Floor count: 22
- Floor area: 505,269 sq ft (46,941.0 m^{2})

Michael DiSalle Government Center is the fourth tallest building in Toledo located on 1 Government Center. The building is named after Michael DiSalle who was elected Governor of Ohio in 1958.

The Architect of this Building, Minoru Yamasaki, is best known for designing the original World Trade Center in New York City.

== See also ==
- List of tallest buildings in Toledo, Ohio
- Toledo, Ohio
