= PNC Bank Building (Toledo, Ohio) =

Skyscraper in Toledo, Ohio, US

Coordinates: 41°39′05″N 83°32′07″W

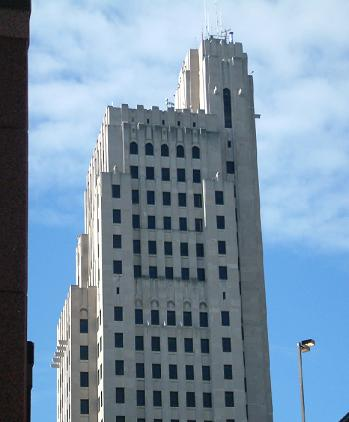
PNC Bank Building

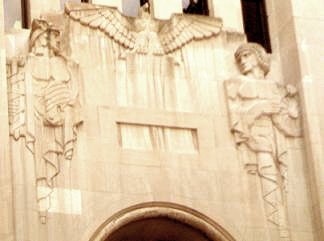
North (Northeast) facade

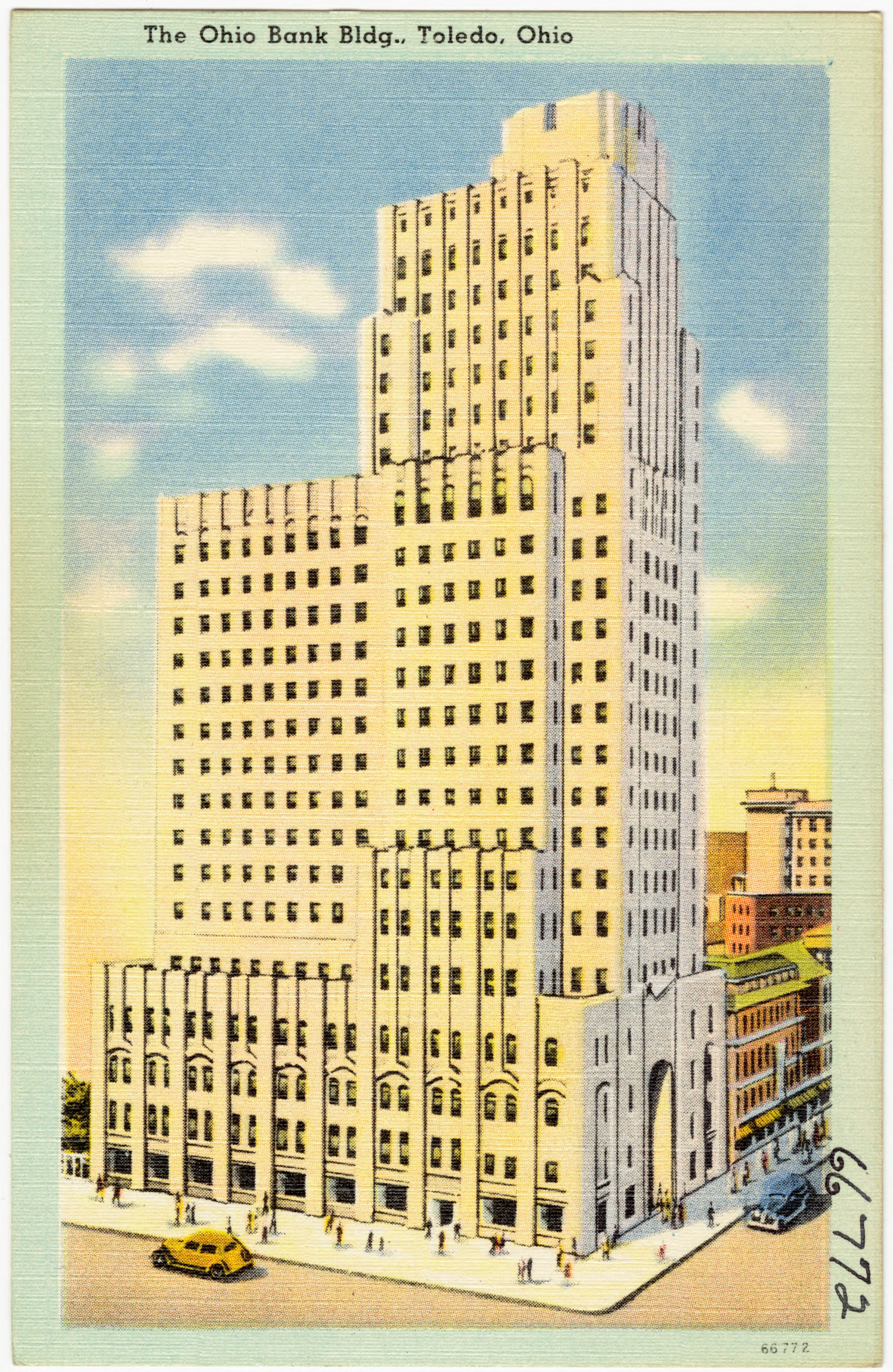
The Ohio Bank Bldg as depicted on a vintage postcard (circa 1930)

The PNC Bank Building (formerly the National City Bank Building) is a 368 ft (112 m) tall skyscraper located at 405 Madison Avenue in Downtown Toledo, Ohio. The limestone-faced steel-frame building was constructed in 1930 and is an example of the Art Deco style of architecture. It stood as Toledo's tallest building for 39 years, from its completion in 1930 until the completion of the Tower on the Maumee in 1969. The PNC Bank Building is currently the third-tallest building in Toledo.

== Facts ==
- Building Completed: 1930
- No. of Floors: 29
- Northwest Ohio's tallest building from 1930–1969, now ranked as third tallest.
- Cost at Completion: $5.5 million
- Architect: Mills, Rhines, Bellman & Nordhoff
- It is faced with Indiana limestone above a base of Wisconsin black granite.
- Entrance features 44-foot arch, African mahogany, and green terrazzo floor.
- A point on the building called "Triangulation Station Bank" serves as the reference datum for the city of Toledo
- One of Toledo's original civil defense sirens was installed on the roof in the 1950s and remains in service.

== History ==
The Ohio Bank Building, as it was initially named, was constructed in 1929–30 by the Ohio Savings Bank And Trust for use as their headquarters. The Ohio Savings Bank And Trust occupied the office building for less than a year before the bank went out of business during the Great Depression.

In 1935, the Owens-Illinois Glass Company moved their headquarters into the building. The building would remain O-I's headquarters until its move to One SeaGate in 1982. During this period the building was known as the Owens-Illinois Building and a large O-I sign topped the building. When O-I moved out, the iconic sign was donated to Owens Community College and moved to the campus after being airlifted off the building by a helicopter.

The building was purchased from O-I in 1982 by Toledo-based Ohio Citizens Bank, and the building was renamed as the Ohio Citizens Bank Building after O-I departed.

The Ohio Citizens Bank subsequently merged with Cleveland, Ohio based National City Bank and in 1992 the building name changed to the National City Bank Building.

In 1997 the building was sold by Ohio Citizens Bank for $8.3 million to 405 Madison Ltd. LLC, an investment group headed by local DiSalle Real Estate Co. executive William Thees. The new owners restored much of the original ornamental plaster, gargoyles, terrazzo flooring and travertine marble.

In 2008 Pittsburgh, Pennsylvania-based PNC Financial Services acquired National City Bank, and in 2010 the building was renamed the PNC Bank building.

The building at 405 Madison Ave. was sold in 2017 for $9.6 million. The new owner is PLT Holdings, a limited liability company that registered to do business in Ohio in 2013.

== See also ==
- List of tallest buildings in Toledo, Ohio
