= Warehouse District (Toledo, Ohio) =

District of Toledo, Ohio, US

Coordinates: 41°38′47″N 83°32′32″W

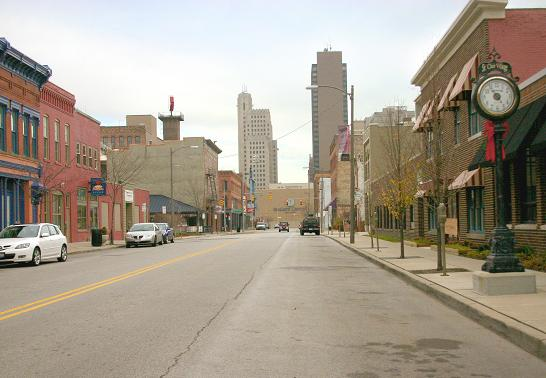
St. Clair facing East

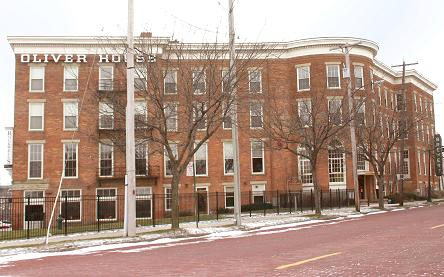
Oliver House

The Warehouse District in central Toledo, Ohio, United States has seen an upturn with new residential and entertainment developments alongside many in-use warehouses and warehouses that are in the process of being renovated. The district has been the epicenter of recent revitalization efforts of downtown Toledo. A wide variety of bars and restaurants can be found in this district. Hensville is a pedestrian mall that is located directly behind the Fifth Third Field and is a hub of live entertainment. The Warehouse District is immediately south of Downtown and is roughly bordered by Swan Creek, Monroe Street, Ontario Street, the Anthony Wayne Trail and I-75.

== Attractions ==
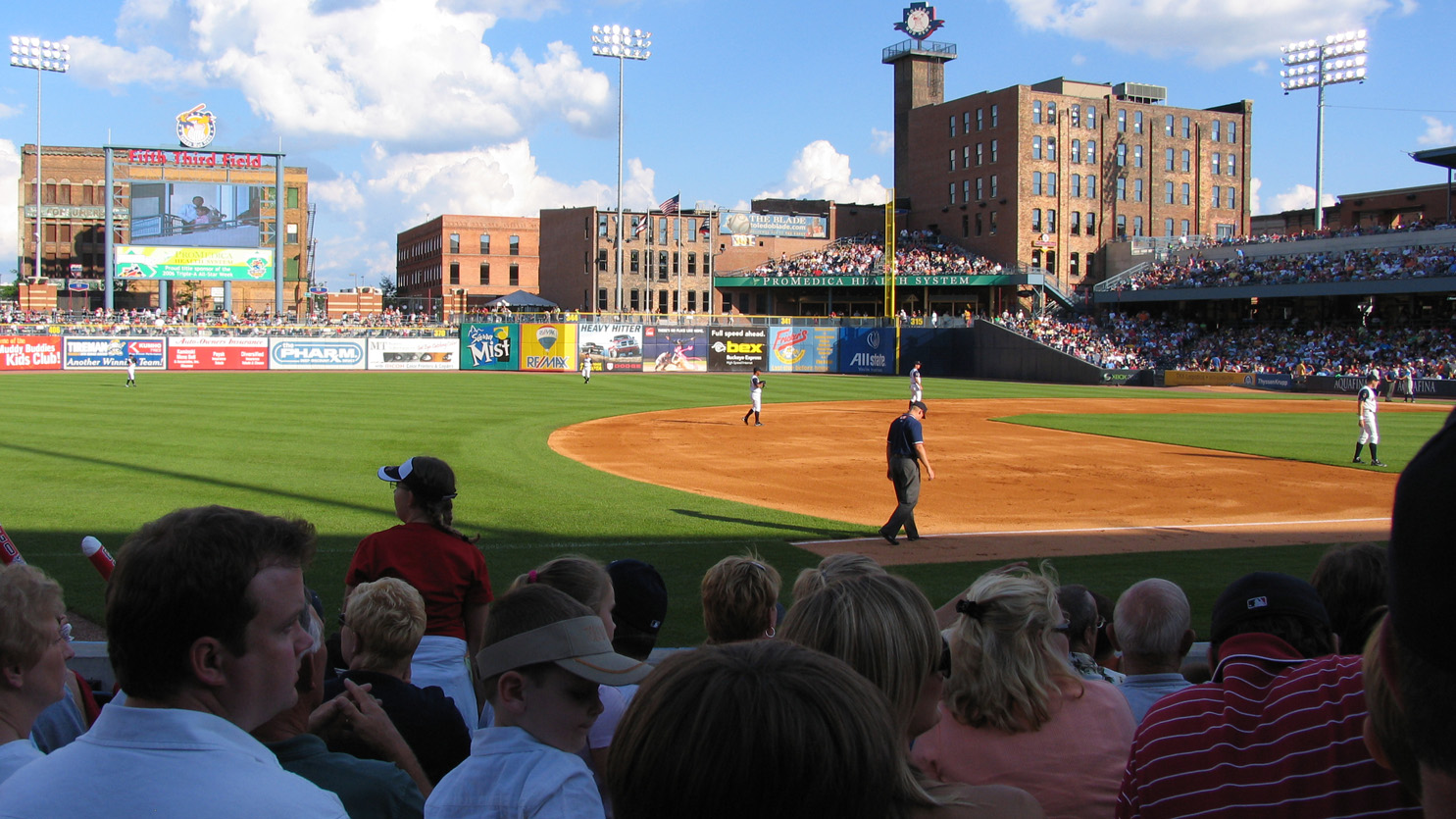
Fifth Third Field

- 20 N Gallery (Art gallery)
- Erie Street Market
- Fifth Third Field (Mud Hens Baseball)
- Oliver House
- St. Patrick's Catholic Church
- Sur St. Clair (Art gallery)
- Toledo Art Walk
- Sweet Nate's Cafe (in the Oliver House)
- Blarney Irish Pub
- Pizza Papalis
- Frickers
- Packo's at the Park
- Ye Olde Cock 'n Bull Tavern
- Spaghetti Warehouse
- Ye Olde Durty Bird
- Bronze Boar
- The Retirement Group
- Martin Wood Appraisal
- NBS
- Paul Sullivan Architecture
- Gathered Glass Blowing Hotshop & Gallery
- Ahava Beauty Salon
- Bartley Lofts
- Standart Lofts
- Ottawa Condos
- Kengo Sushi & Yakitori
- M'Osteria and Bar
- Table Forty 4
