= Westmoreland (Toledo, Ohio) =

Neighborhood in Toledo, Ohio, United States

Coordinates: 41°39′29″N 83°35′22″W

Westmoreland Sign.

Examples of Westmoreland architecture.

Monastery of the Sisters of the Visitation

Westmoreland is a historic neighborhood in Toledo, Ohio and is roughly bordered by Dorr Street, Parkside Boulevard, Bancroft Street, and Upton Avenue.

"In March 1986 Westmoreland, located about one half mile from the University of Toledo, was designated a historical district by the United States Department of Interior." "This national designation has helped the neighborhood preserve its unique character."

"The vision of real estate developers William B. Welles and Badger C. Bowen, the neighborhood was named because of its rolling hills that reminded them of the east Virginia county [where] George Washington was born." "Appropriately, the streets were named after other Virginia namesakes, such as Mount Vernon, Richmond, Potomac and Shenandoah."

"It was the home of some of Toledo's most prominent Business men and Industrialists." "Names like Folgers, Spieker, Pinkerton, Siegel, McKesson, Moburg, Ohlinger, Fructhman all called Westmoreland home." "[The neighborhood] dates back to 1918 when construction began and now has 217 of the original 323 built upon, which allows many green park like areas in the neighborhoods."

== Neighborhood Sites of Interest ==
- Gesu School
- Monastery of the Sisters of the Visitation
