= Tower on the Maumee =

Skyscraper in Toledo, Ohio

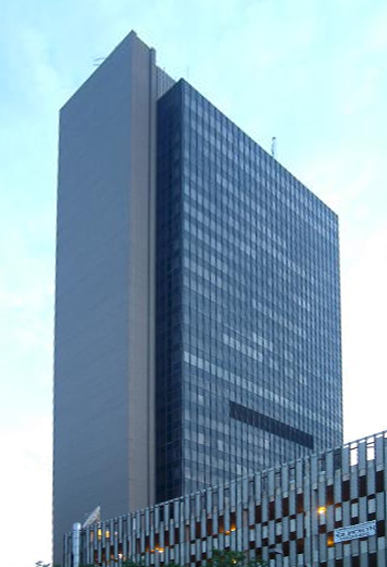
- Comprehensive view
- Former names: Fiberglas Tower, Riverview, Levis Square, Riverview One, HyTower

General information
- Location: 200 N. St. Clair St. and 215 and 239 Summit St., Toledo, Ohio, United States
- Coordinates: 41°39′1″N 83°32′6″W
- Groundbreaking: May 1, 1967
- Completed: April 5, 1968
- Opened: July 1969
- Owner: Eyde Company

Technical details
- Material: Glass, concrete, aluminium
- Floor count: 30

Design and construction
- Architects: Harrison & Abramovitz; Richards, Bauer & Moorhead
- Main contractor: Turner Construction

Website
- https://toweronmaumee.com
- Riverview
- U.S. National Register of Historic Places
- NRHP reference No.: 12000394
- Added to NRHP: July 3, 2012

Tower on the Maumee (formerly known as Fiberglas Tower) is a skyscraper at 200 North Saint Clair Street in Toledo, Ohio. Constructed in 1969, the 400 feet (120 m) building is an example of the international style of architecture. In 2012, the building was listed on the National Register of Historic Places under the name "Riverview".

It was designed as the world headquarters for the Toledo manufacturer Owens-Corning Fiberglas Company, which occupied the building for 27 years until moving elsewhere in downtown Toledo in 1996. Until October 2018, the building was vacant. In October 2016, the Eyde Company renamed the building Tower on the Maumee and announced plans to transform the top floors into luxury apartments and renovate the commercial office space on the lower floors.

== History ==
Riverview One Corp., the developer of the project, expected construction to cost between $12 million and $18 million. The tower was designed by architects Harrison & Abramovitz of New York City and Richards, Bauer & Moorhead of Toledo and the general contractor was Turner Construction of New York.

The Fort Meigs Hotel, a 10-story building constructed in 1927, occupied the downtown Toledo site at 200 North Saint Clair Street until 1966 when it and other structures were demolished in preparation for the Riverview project.

Groundbreaking for Fiberglas Tower was held on May 1, 1967. Leadership of the Owens-Corning Fiberglas Corp. announced at the groundbreaking that they planned to occupy the tower. The unusual spelling of its original name (Fiberglas instead of Fiberglass) comes from Owens-Corning's use of Fiberglas as the trademark name of its glass fiber products, as the generic name fiberglass could not be restricted to use as a trademark.

Topping out of the tower occurred on April 5, 1968.

Owens-Corning occupied nearly all of the Fiberglas Tower when it opened in July 1969. In 1993, Owens-Corning announced plans to vacate the Fiberglas Tower. The tower remained vacant for more than twenty years after the O-C departure in 1996. Asbestos, which was partially responsible for OC's departure, was removed in 2012.

In 2017, Eyde announced that renovations by Quinn Evans Architects were partially complete and that a new tenant would move in in 2018.

In October 2018, Directions Credit Union became the first business to occupy space in the renovated building. The company moved its headquarters there from Sylvania.

== See also ==
- List of tallest buildings in Toledo, Ohio
- National Register of Historic Places listings in Lucas County, Ohio
