= Ottawa Hills, Ohio =

Village of Ottawa Hills
- Village
- Location in Lucas County and the state of Ohio.

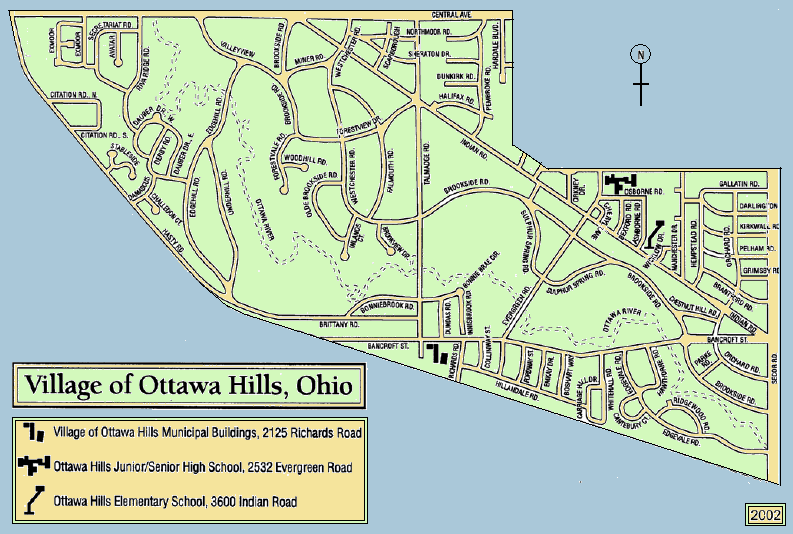
- Street-level map of Ottawa Hills
- Coordinates: 41°39′56″N 83°37′50″W
- Country: United States
- State: Ohio
- County: Lucas

Area
  - Total: 1.90 sq mi (4.91 km^{2})
  - Land: 1.88 sq mi (4.87 km^{2})
  - Water: 0.015 sq mi (0.04 km^{2})
- Elevation: 610 ft (190 m)

Population (2020)
  - Total: 4,790
  - Density: 2,546.9/sq mi (983.35/km^{2})
- Time zone: UTC−5 (EST)
  - Summer (DST): UTC−4 (EDT)
- FIPS code: 39-59010
- GNIS feature ID: 1086530
- Website: www.ottawahills.org

Ottawa Hills is a village in Lucas County, Ohio, United States. The population was 4,790 at the 2020 census. The village was developed on both sides of the Ottawa River (Ohio) and serves as a bedroom community and suburb of Toledo.

== History ==
The Village of Ottawa Hills was developed beginning in 1915. John North Willys, president of the Overland Company, acquired approximately 1,200 acres (4.9 km^{2}) beginning at the intersection of Bancroft Street and Indian Road and extending along the Ottawa River to Central Avenue.

He started development that year, as reported by The Toledo Times:

Landscape architects, city planning engineers, landscape gardeners, and other experts, backed by an army of workmen equipment with the latest machinery and tools have been steadily at work on the tract for over a year. They have practically completed the improvement of the first 100-acre (0.40 km^{2}) unit of the development, lying at Arrowhead Point (former known as 5 Point). This is at the intersection of Bancroft Street, Secor and Indian Roads, a 20 minute ride from the business district. A cursory inspection of the property reveals the scale on which the improvements are being made. Practically 35% of it has been given over to park purposes. This includes the wooded area along the river's course, flanked on one side by Percifilous Bluff and the other side by a slope that rises, by gentle degrees, to a level with the top of the bluff. In the valley, river banks have been dressed gracefully to the water's edge. --The Toledo Times, August 1, 1915

John North Willys turned to the E. H. Close Realty Company for the development of Ottawa Hills. The E. H. Close Realty Company had developed more than 1,000 acres (4.0 km^{2}) of land in Toledo and the surrounding area. Planners, engineers, and architects with national reputations were involved in the layout and design of the Village. They were also established various restrictive covenants to assure proper quality development and construction of homes.

Several annexations have substantially changed the shape of the village from the original 1,200 acres (4.9 km^{2}). Much of the early development of the village conforms to the original plans that date back to 1915. The portion of the village adjacent to Secor Road and south of Bancroft Street, Plat 1, is very similar in layout and design to the original plans. Many of the oldest homes are located in Plat 1. E. H. Close himself lived in this plat in one of the first homes built in the Village.

The Ottawa Hills school district ranked first in the state in student performance for the 2007–2008 school year.

== Geography ==
According to the United States Census Bureau, the village has a total area of 1.87 square miles (4.84 km^{2}), of which 1.85 square miles (4.79 km^{2}) is land and 0.02 square miles (0.05 km^{2}) is water.

== Demographics ==
Historical population
Census	Pop.	Note	%±
1930	1,185		—
1940	1,970		66.2%
1950	2,333		18.4%
1960	3,245		39.1%
1970	4,270		31.6%
1980	4,065		−4.8%
1990	4,543		11.8%
2000	4,564		0.5%
2010	4,517		−1.0%
2020	4,790		6.0%
U.S. Decennial Census

=== 2020 census ===
As of the 2020 census, Ottawa Hills had a population of 4,790. The median age was 41.5 years. 28.9% of residents were under the age of 18 and 17.3% were 65 years of age or older. For every 100 females there were 98.2 males, and for every 100 females age 18 and over there were 92.2 males age 18 and over.

100.0% of residents lived in urban areas, while 0.0% lived in rural areas.

There were 1,698 households in Ottawa Hills, of which 44.1% had children under the age of 18 living in them. Of all households, 67.1% were married-couple households, 10.2% were households with a male householder and no spouse or partner present, and 19.7% were households with a female householder and no spouse or partner present. About 18.0% of all households were made up of individuals and 10.6% had someone living alone who was 65 years of age or older.

There were 1,822 housing units, of which 6.8% were vacant. The homeowner vacancy rate was 2.6% and the rental vacancy rate was 5.6%.

Ottawa Hills racial composition
Race	Number	Percentage
White (NH)	3,671	76.6%
Black or African American (NH)	166	3.47%
Native American (NH)	7	0.15%
Asian (NH)	470	9.81%
Pacific Islander (NH)	0	0%
Other/mixed	329	6.87%
Hispanic or Latino	147	3.07%

=== 2013 census ===
As of the census of 2013, the median income for a household in the village was $111,364, while the mean household income is $158,249. For families in the village, the median income is $138,295, while the mean for families is $189,597, 31.5% of families earning more than $200,000 per year. Males had a median income of $104,700 versus $69,211 for females. The per capita income for the village was $58,731. 3.1% of the population and 1.0% of families were below the poverty line. 2.0% of those under the age of 18 and 1.8% of those 65 and older were living below the poverty line.

=== 2010 census ===
As of the census of 2010, there were 4,517 people, 1,740 households, and 1,265 families living in the village. The population density was 2,441.6 inhabitants per square mile (942.7/km^{2}). There were 1,850 housing units at an average density of 1,000.0 per square mile (386.1/km^{2}). The racial makeup of the village was 87.8% White, 3.7% African American, 0.2% Native American, 6.0% Asian, 0.6% from other races, and 1.8% from two or more races. Hispanic or Latino of any race were 2.0% of the population.

There were 1,740 households, of which 37.6% had children under the age of 18 living with them, 63.1% were married couples living together, 7.0% had a female householder with no husband present, 2.6% had a male householder with no wife present, and 27.3% were non-families. 25.3% of all households were made up of individuals, and 14.1% had someone living alone who was 65 years of age or older. The average household size was 2.60 and the average family size was 3.14.

The median age in the village was 43.6 years. 28.6% of residents were under the age of 18; 5.4% were between the ages of 18 and 24; 18.2% were from 25 to 44; 31.6% were from 45 to 64; and 16.2% were 65 years of age or older. The gender makeup of the village was 47.3% male and 52.7% female.

=== 2000 census ===
As of the census of 2000, there were 4,564 people, 1,696 households, and 1,307 families living in the village. The population density was 2,448.6 inhabitants per square mile (945.4/km^{2}). There were 1,786 housing units at an average density of 958.2 per square mile (370.0/km^{2}). The racial makeup of the village was 93.97% White, 1.25% African American, 0.09% Native American, 2.70% Asian, 0.46% from other races, and 1.53% from two or more races. 1.23% of the population were Hispanic or Latino of any race.

There were 1,696 households, out of which 38.7% had children under the age of 18 living with them, 70.0% were married couples living together, 5.1% had a female householder with no husband present, and 22.9% were non-families. 20.9% of all households were made up of individuals, and 13.3% had someone living alone who was 65 years of age or older. The average household size was 2.69 and the average family size was 3.15.

In the village, the population was spread out, with 30.1% under the age of 18, 4.1% from 18 to 24, 19.7% from 25 to 44, 29.9% from 45 to 64, and 16.2% who were 65 years of age or older. The median age was 43 years. For every 100 females there were 94.0 males. For every 100 females age 18 and over, there were 89.2 males.

The median income for a household in the village was $100,000, and the median income for a family was $117,130. Males had a median income of $84,029 versus $40,801 for females. The per capita income for the village was $58,846. 2.1% of the population and 1.4% of families were below the poverty line. 3.2% of those under the age of 18 and 0.8% of those 65 and older were living below the poverty line.

=== Houses ===
The median price of a house in Ottawa Hills is approximately $254,800, with 30% of the homes having been built before 1939. The village's large homes, as 74.2% have eight or more rooms, 40% of homes have four bedrooms, and 12.8% have five or greater. 3.1%, or 42 of the 1366 homes, are multimillion-dollar homes.

== Notable people ==
- Steve Gordon – American screenwriter and film director (Arthur)
- Conrad Kennedy III – pro wrestler
- Ernest M. McSorley – last captain of the SS Edmund Fitzgerald
- Tom Scholz – guitarist and founder of the rock band Boston.

== See also ==
- Ottawa Hills High School, the village high school
- The Village Voice of Ottawa Hills, the village magazine
- Sculpture in the Park, a sculpture garden in the village
- Ottawa River, a creek that runs through much of the village
