= Downtown Toledo =

Coordinates: 41°39′N 83°32′W

- Central business district
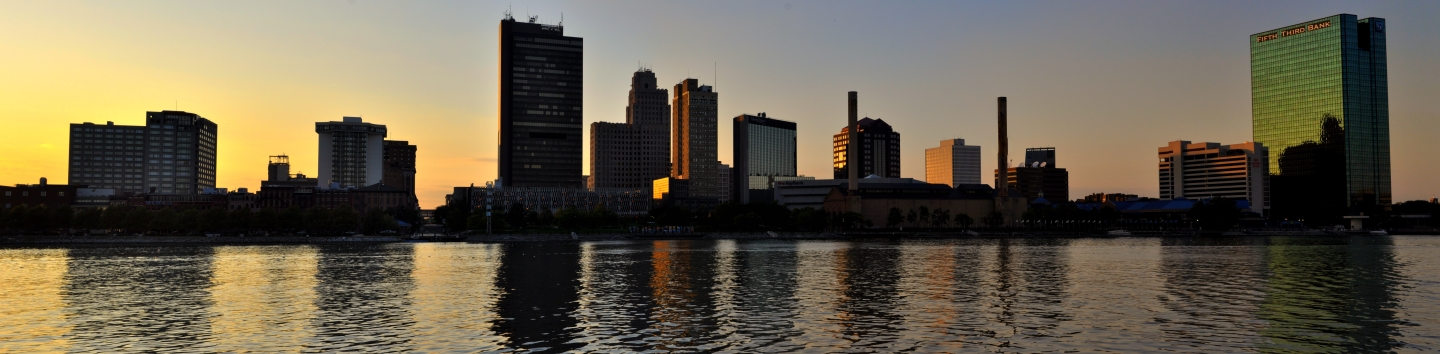
- Downtown Toledo's skyline from across the Maumee River
- Interactive map of Downtown Toledo
- Country: United States
- State: Ohio
- County: Lucas
- City: Toledo
- Time zone: UTC−5 (EST)
  - Summer (DST): UTC−4 (EDT)
- ZIP code: 43604
- Area code(s): 419, 567
- Tallest building: One SeaGate (411 ft)
- Notable districts: Warehouse District; Hensville; Vistula Historic District; UpTown
- Website: downtowntoledo.org

Downtown Toledo is the central business district of Toledo, Ohio, United States. Since the mid-2010s, the area has undergone a significant revitalization centered on the Maumee River waterfront, the Warehouse District, and the "Four Corners" intersection at Huron Street and Madison Avenue.

== Districts ==
- Warehouse District: A former industrial area now home to loft apartments, restaurants, and the Fifth Third Field.
- Hensville: An entertainment district adjacent to the ballpark featuring renovated historic buildings, outdoor event spaces, and dining.
- UpTown: Located just west of the core, known for its arts scene, the Valentine Theatre, and the newly opened Innovation Post (formerly the Jefferson Center).
- Vistula: Toledo's oldest neighborhood, currently seeing riverfront park expansion via the Glass City Riverwalk project.

== Major attractions ==
- Fifth Third Field: Home of the Toledo Mud Hens.
- Huntington Center: Home of the Toledo Walleye.
- Glass City Riverwalk: A 5-mile public greenway connecting both sides of the river, including the "Ribbon" ice-skating trail at Glass City Metropark.
- Glass City Center: Formerly the SeaGate Convention Centre, which completed a $67.5 million renovation and expansion in 2022.
- Imagination Station: A non-profit science museum on the riverfront.
- Promenade Park: A riverfront park that hosts a popular summer concert series.
- Valentine Theatre: A 125-year-old performing arts center.
- Fort Industry Square: A recently redeveloped historic block featuring luxury residential units and retail.

== Tallest buildings ==
Rank	Name	Height (ft)	Floors	Year
1	One SeaGate	411	32	1982
2	Fiberglas Tower (Tower on the Maumee)	405	30	1970
3	PNC Bank Building	368	27	1932
4	Michael DiSalle Government Center	328	22	1982

== Recent developments ==
- Innovation Post: In February 2025, the city celebrated the grand opening of Innovation Post in the historic Jefferson Center building, serving as a tech and business hub for companies like Segula Technologies.
- Four Corners Project: A long-term redevelopment of the Spitzer, Nicholas, and Nasby buildings at the intersection of Huron and Madison. As of 2026, the Spitzer building is undergoing active conversion into residential housing.

== Gallery ==
Toledo Skyline in Morning

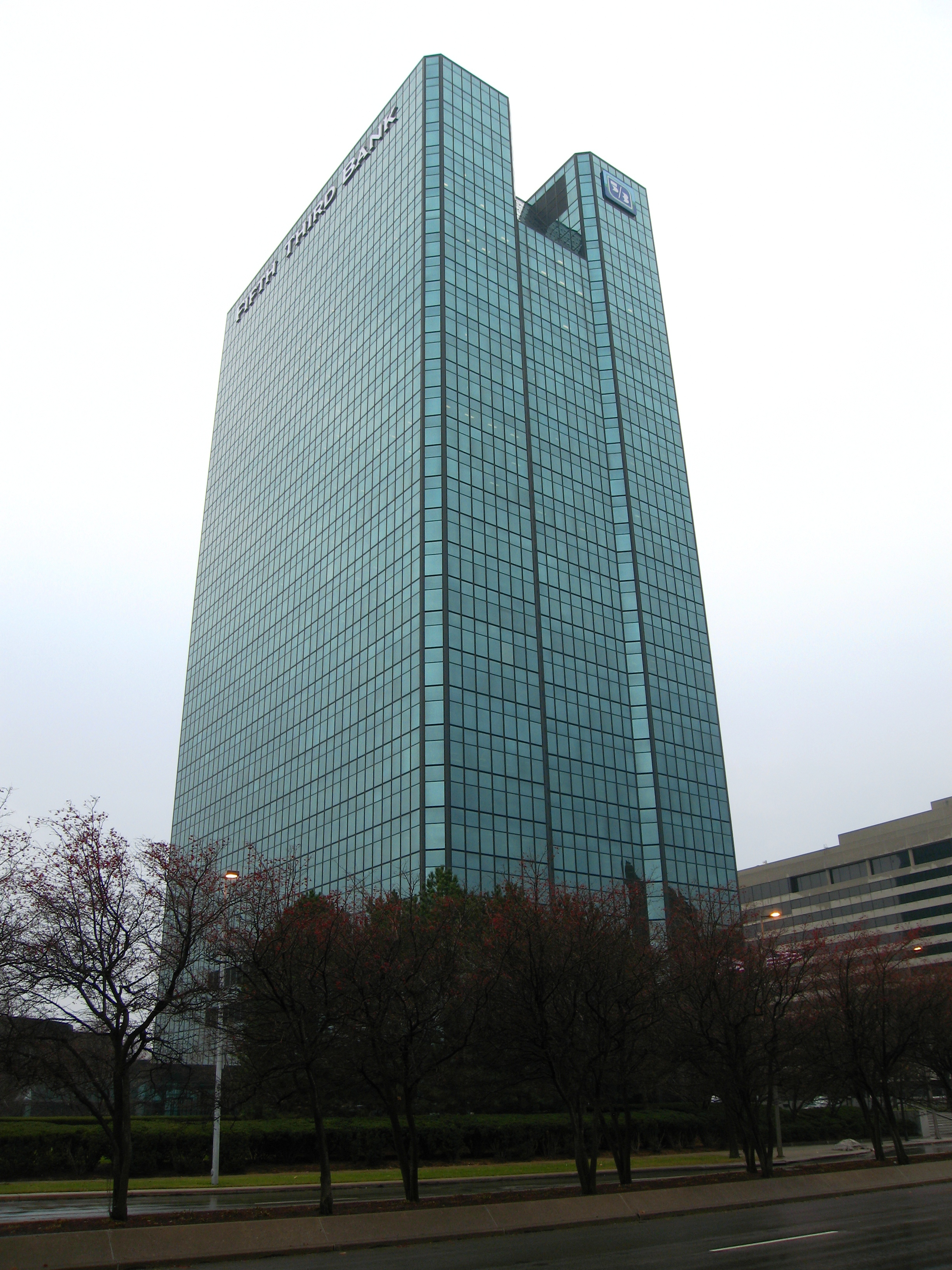
One SeaGate

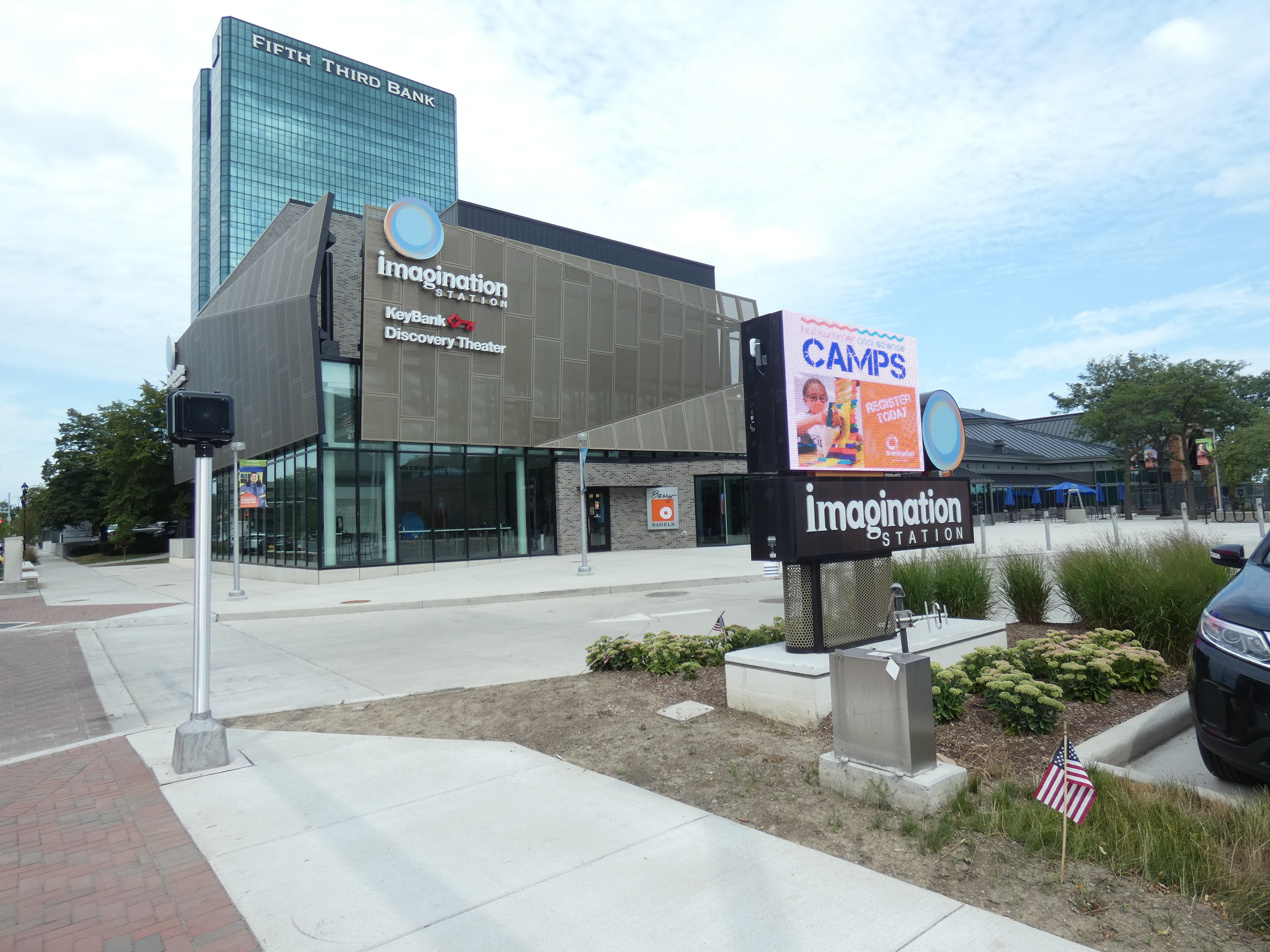
Imagination Station

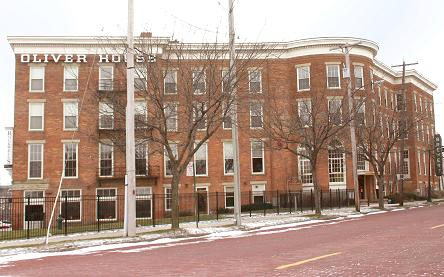
Oliver House

Veterans' Glass City Skyway

MLK Memorial Bridge

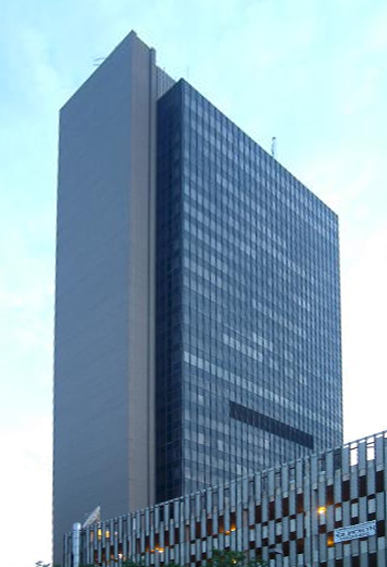
Fiberglass Tower

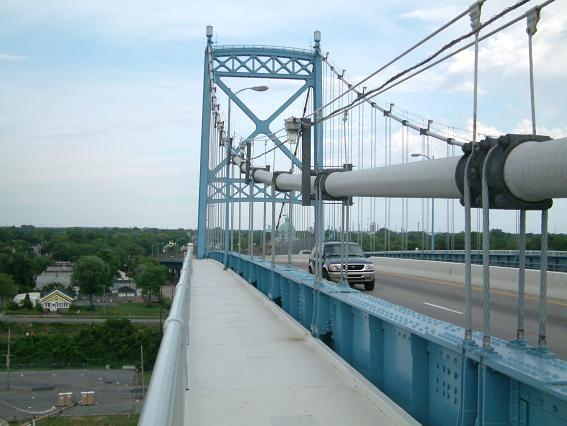
Anthony Wayne Bridge

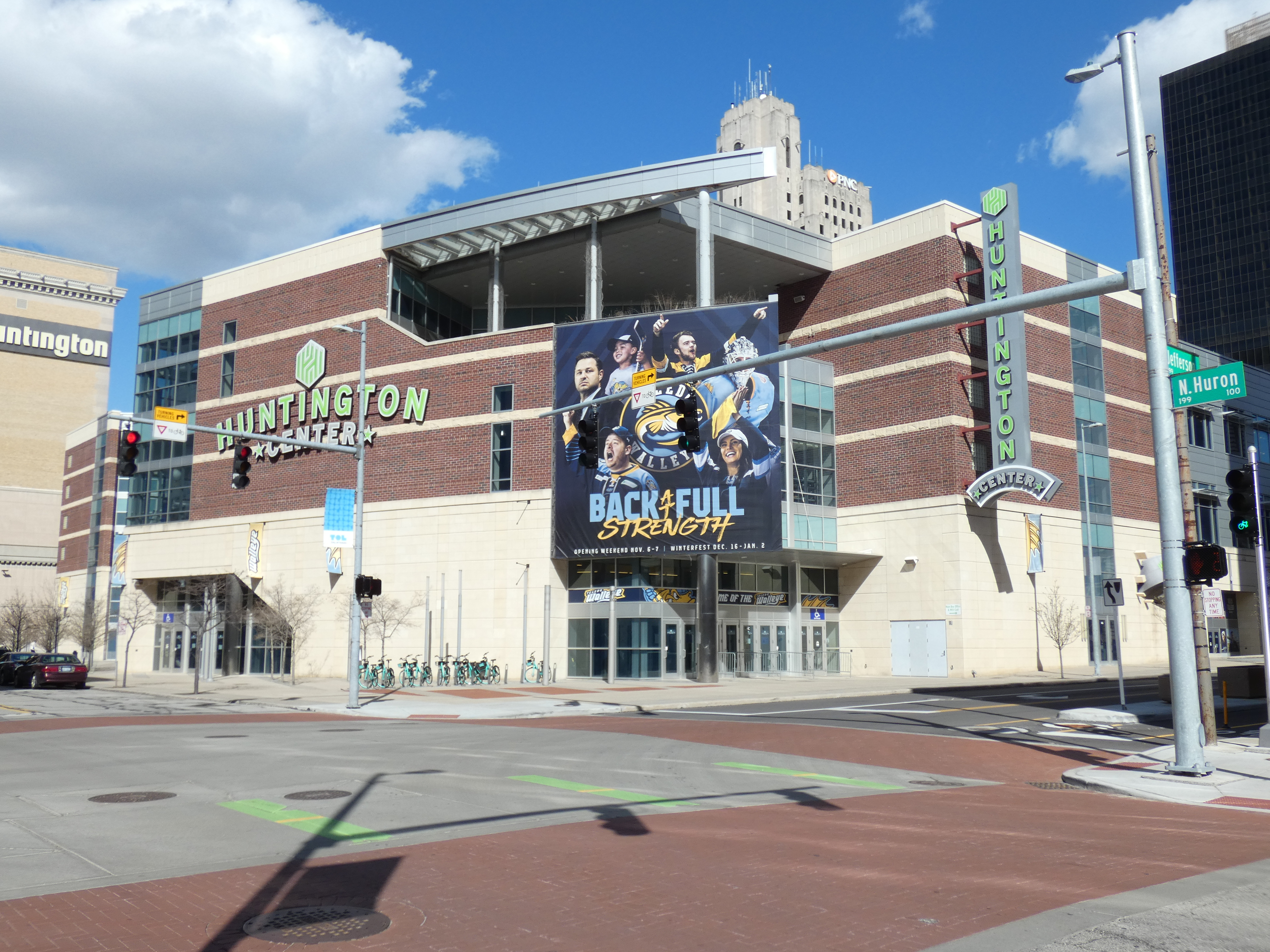
Huntington Center

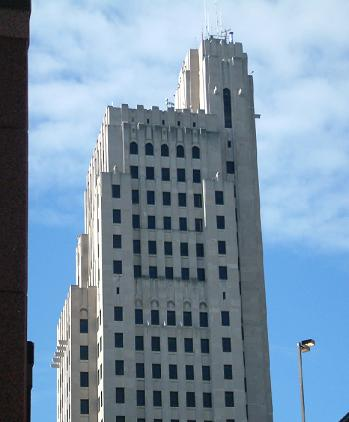
National City Bank Building

Toledo-Lucas County Public Library

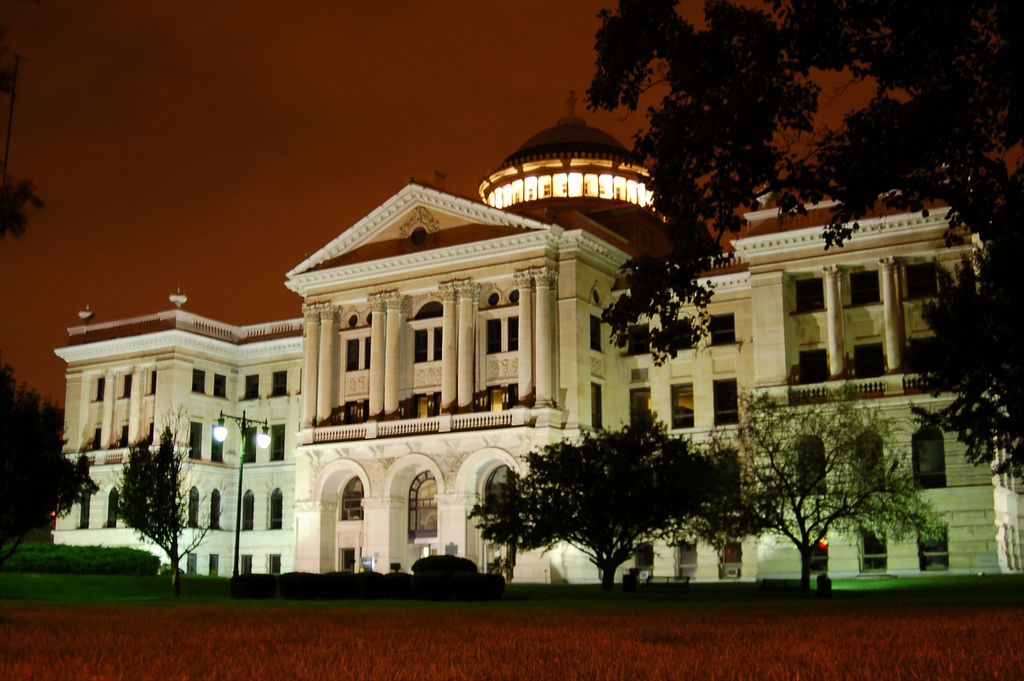
Lucas County Courthouse

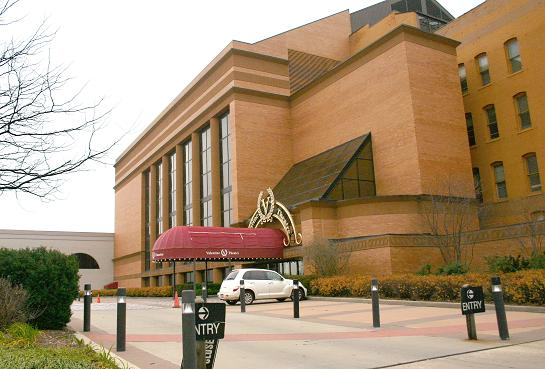
Valentine Theatre

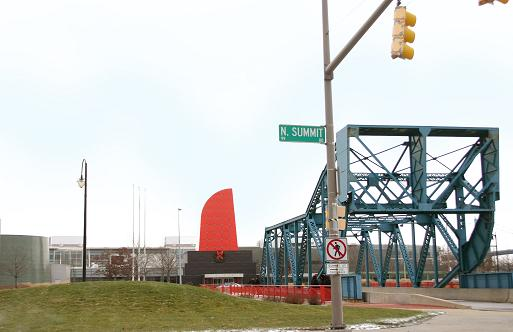
Owens Corning Company Headquarters

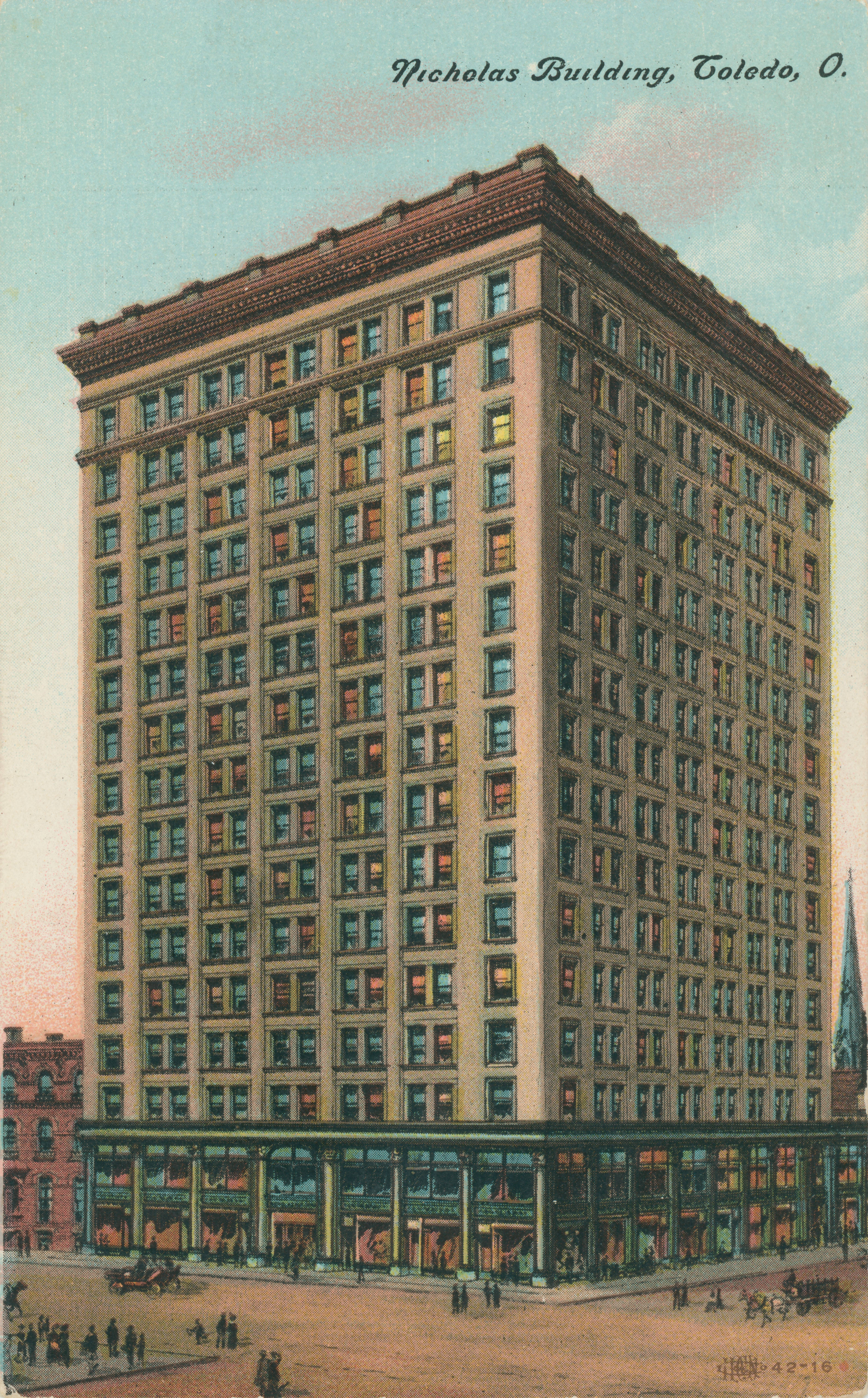
Nicholas Building, 1910s

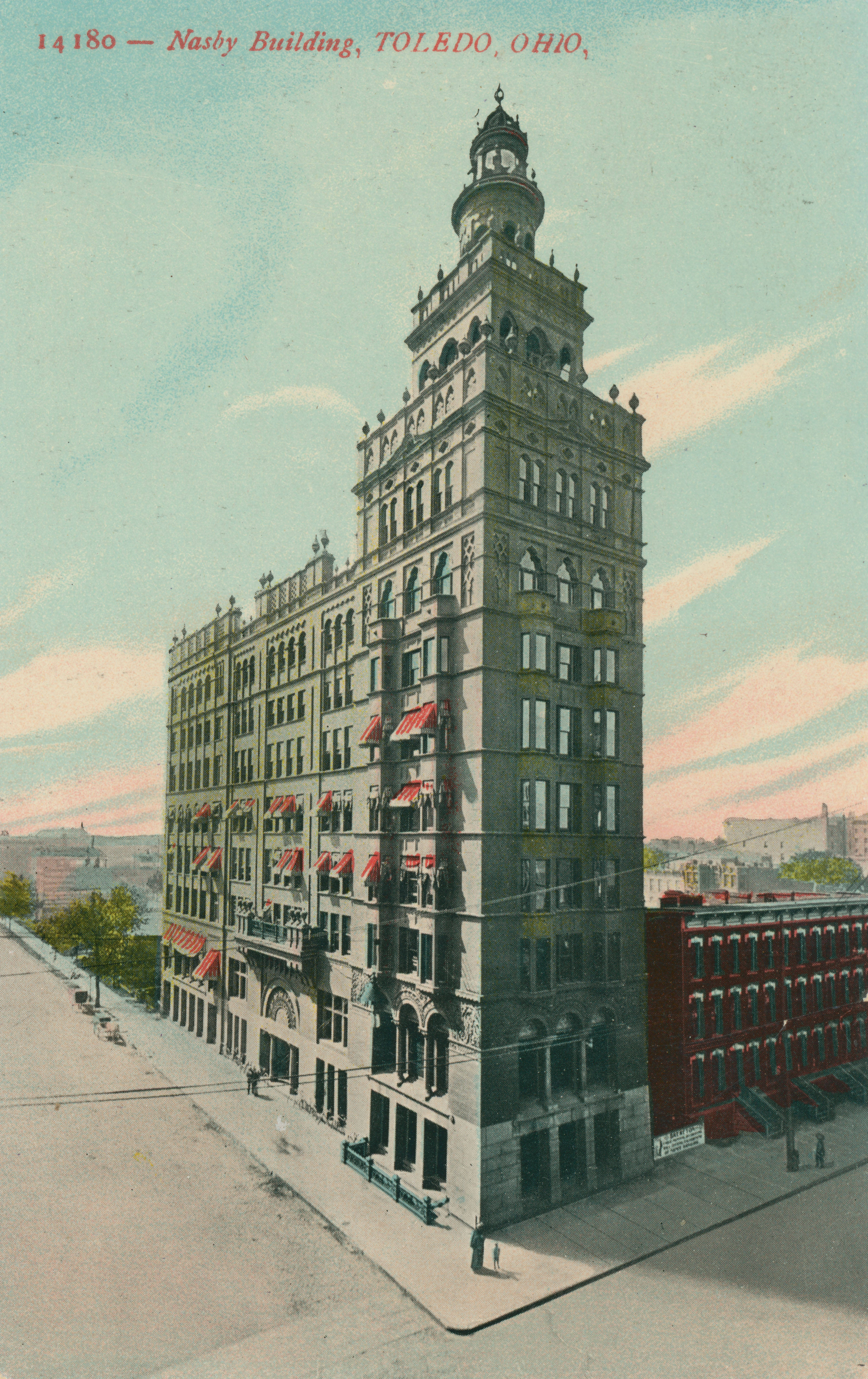
Nasby Building, 1910s

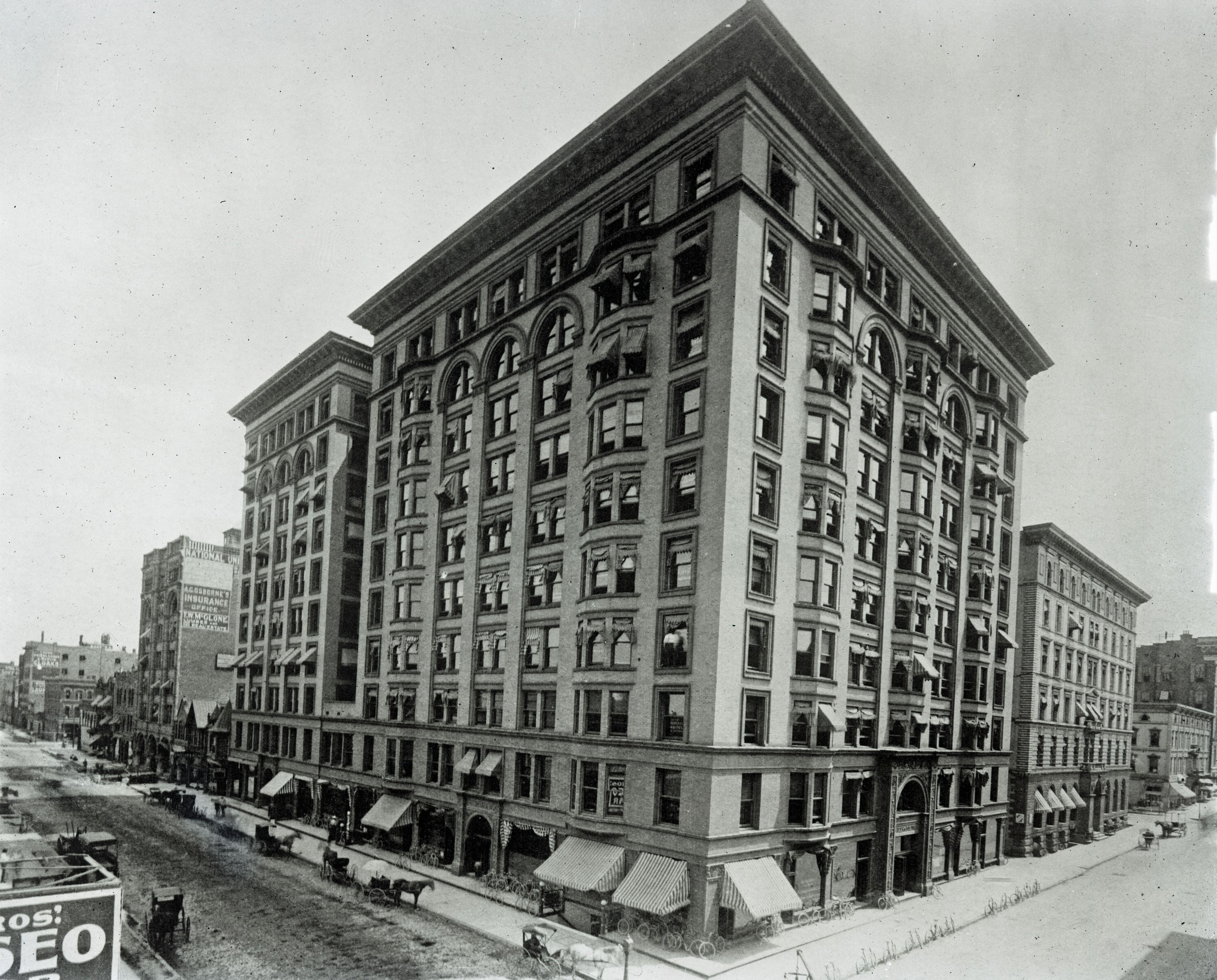
Spitzer Building, 1890s

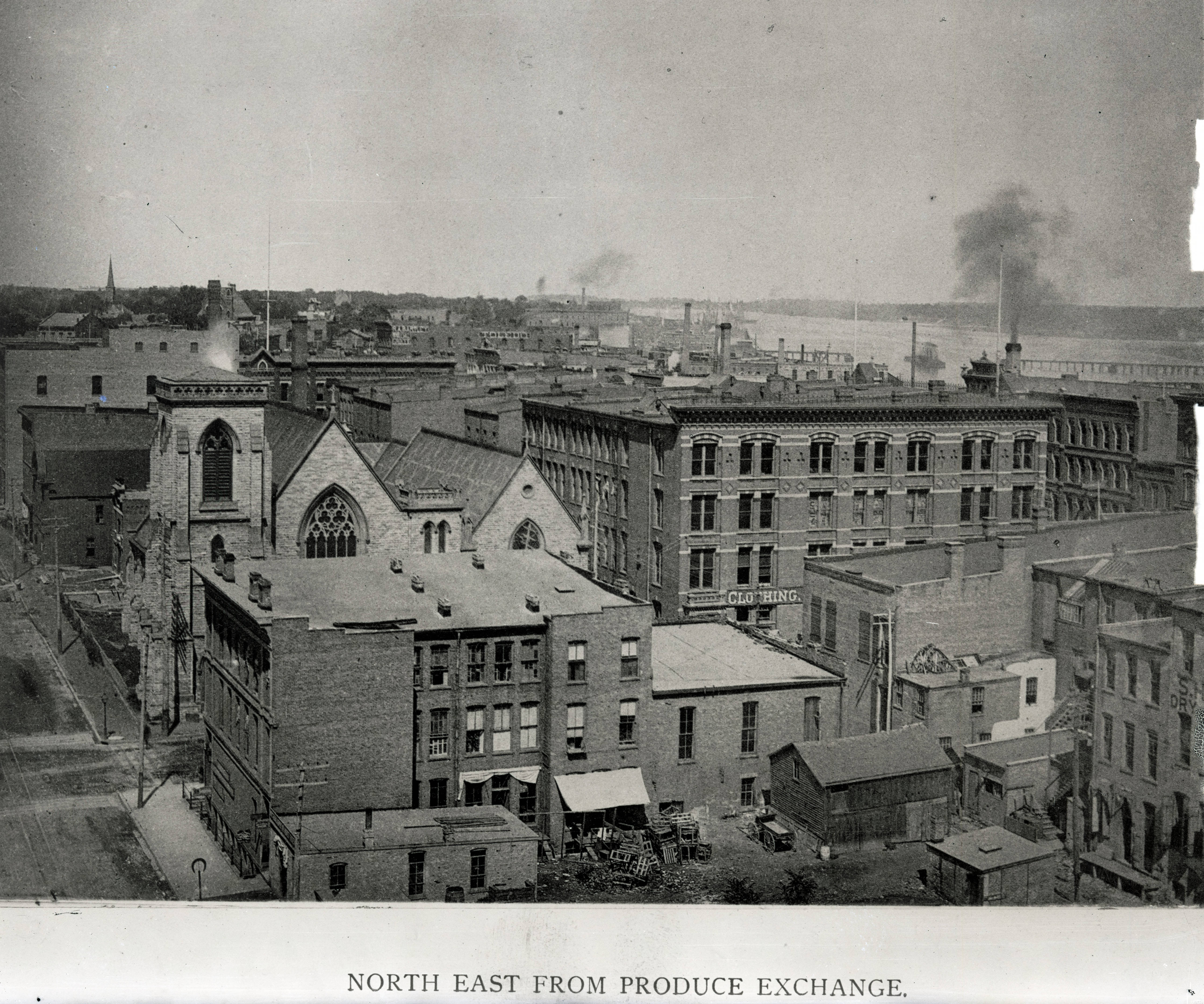
View of downtown Toledo from the Produce Exchange Building, 1890s
