= Toledo, Ohio =

City in Ohio, United States

- City
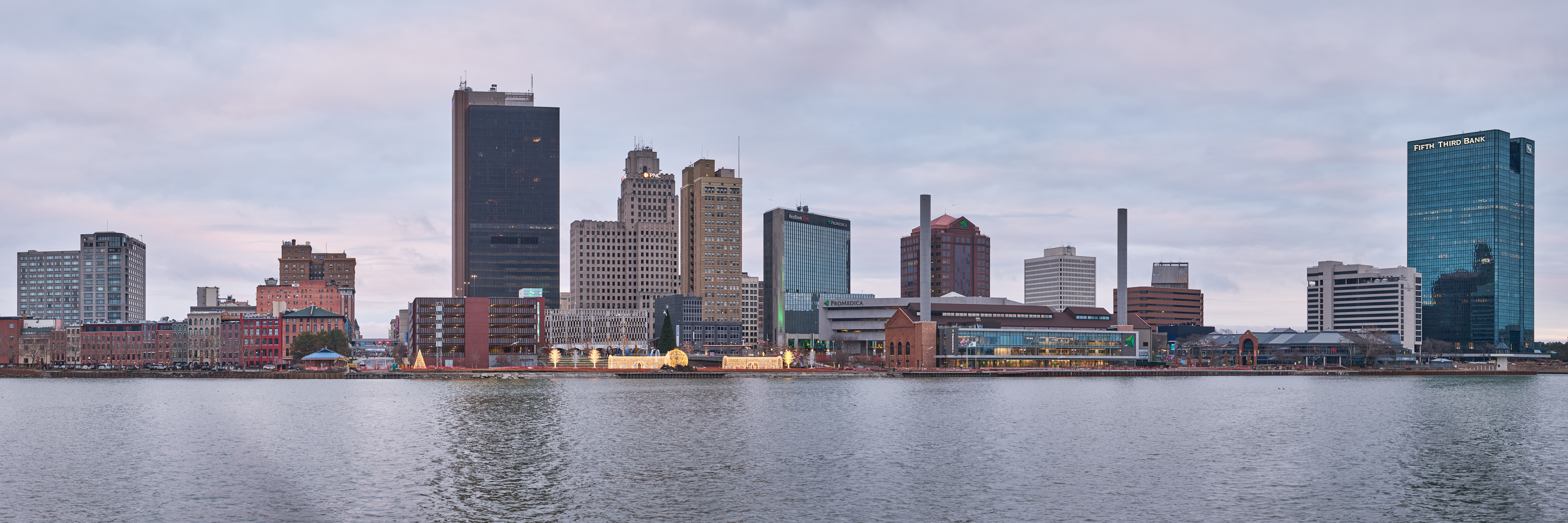
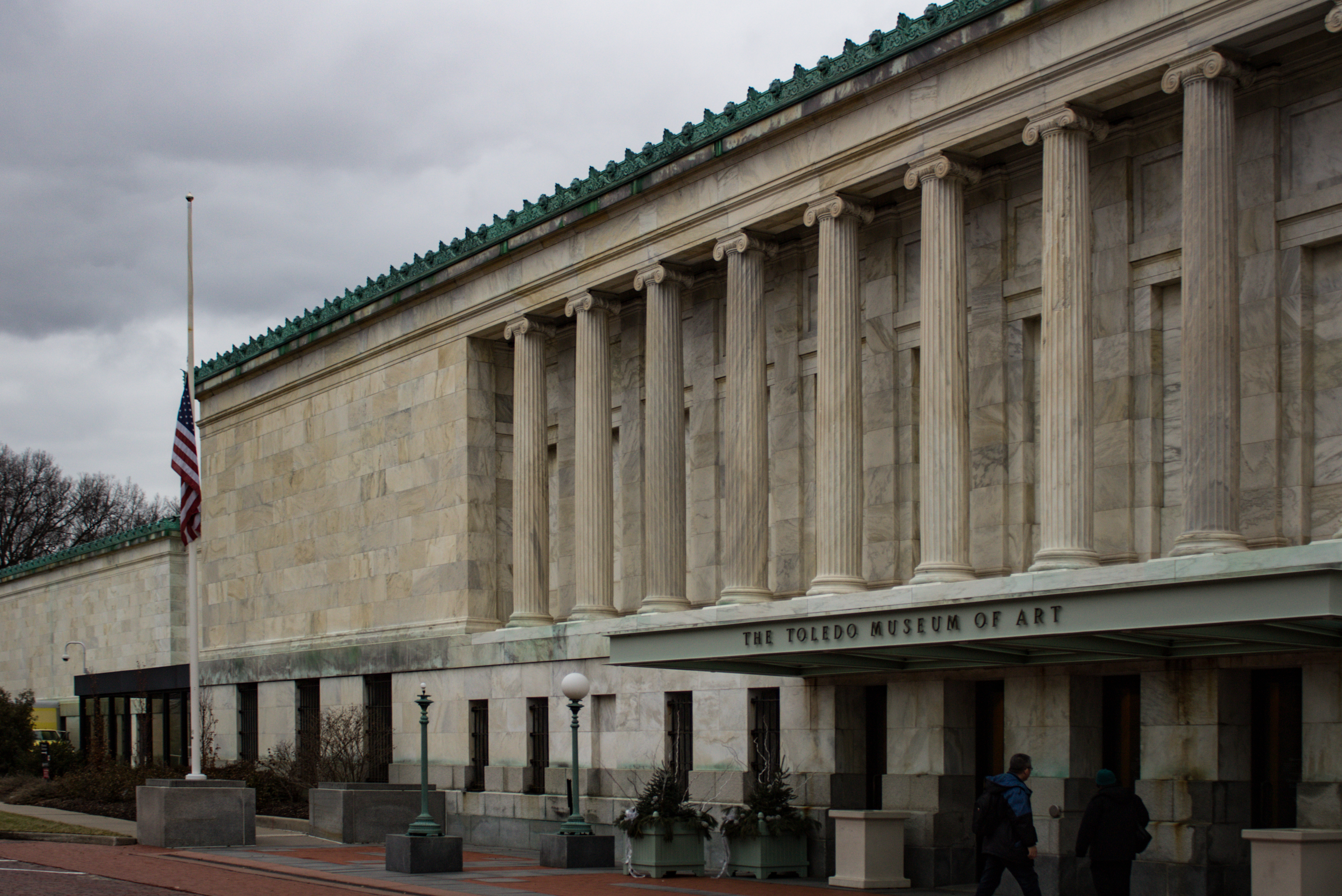
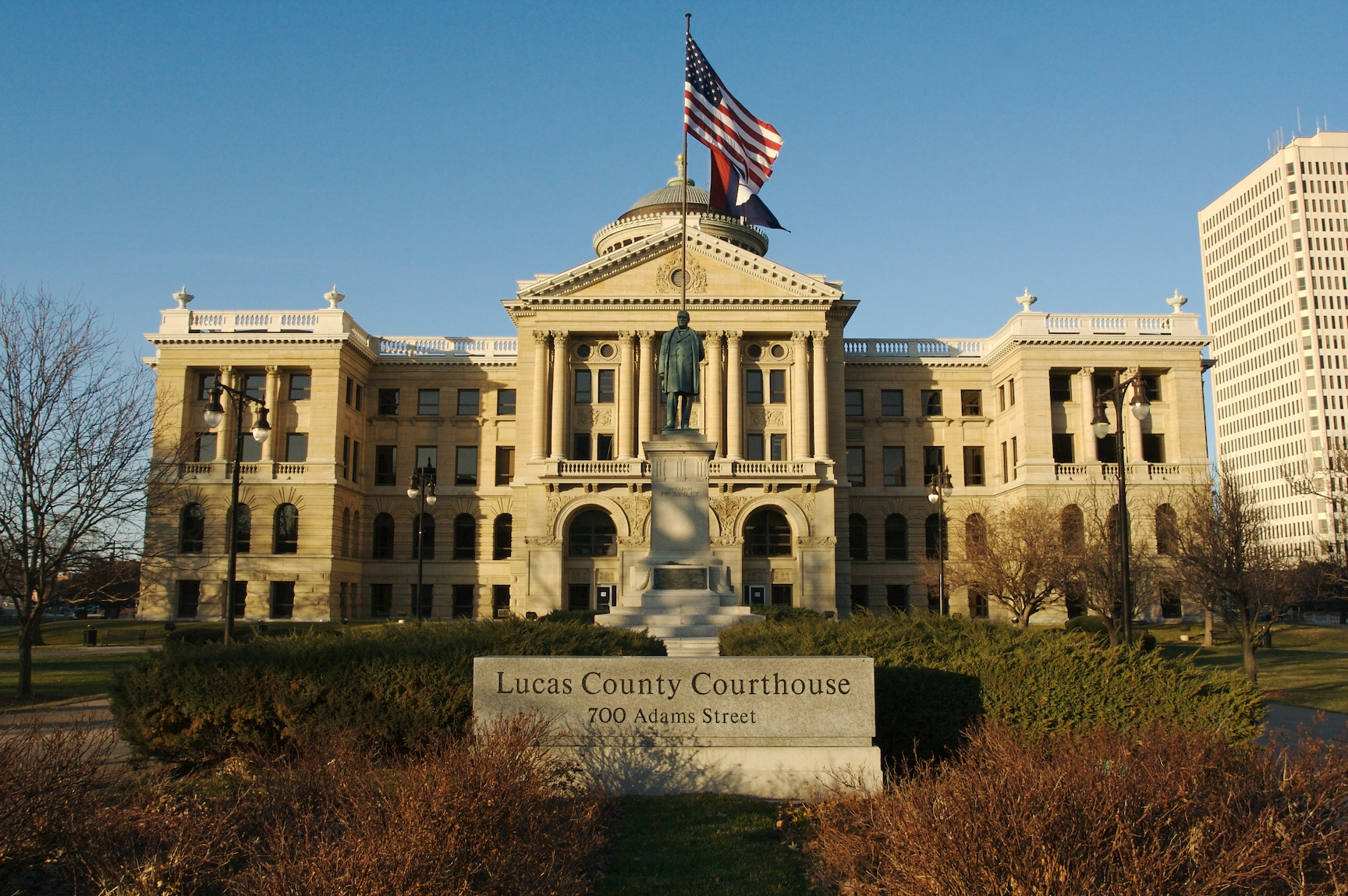
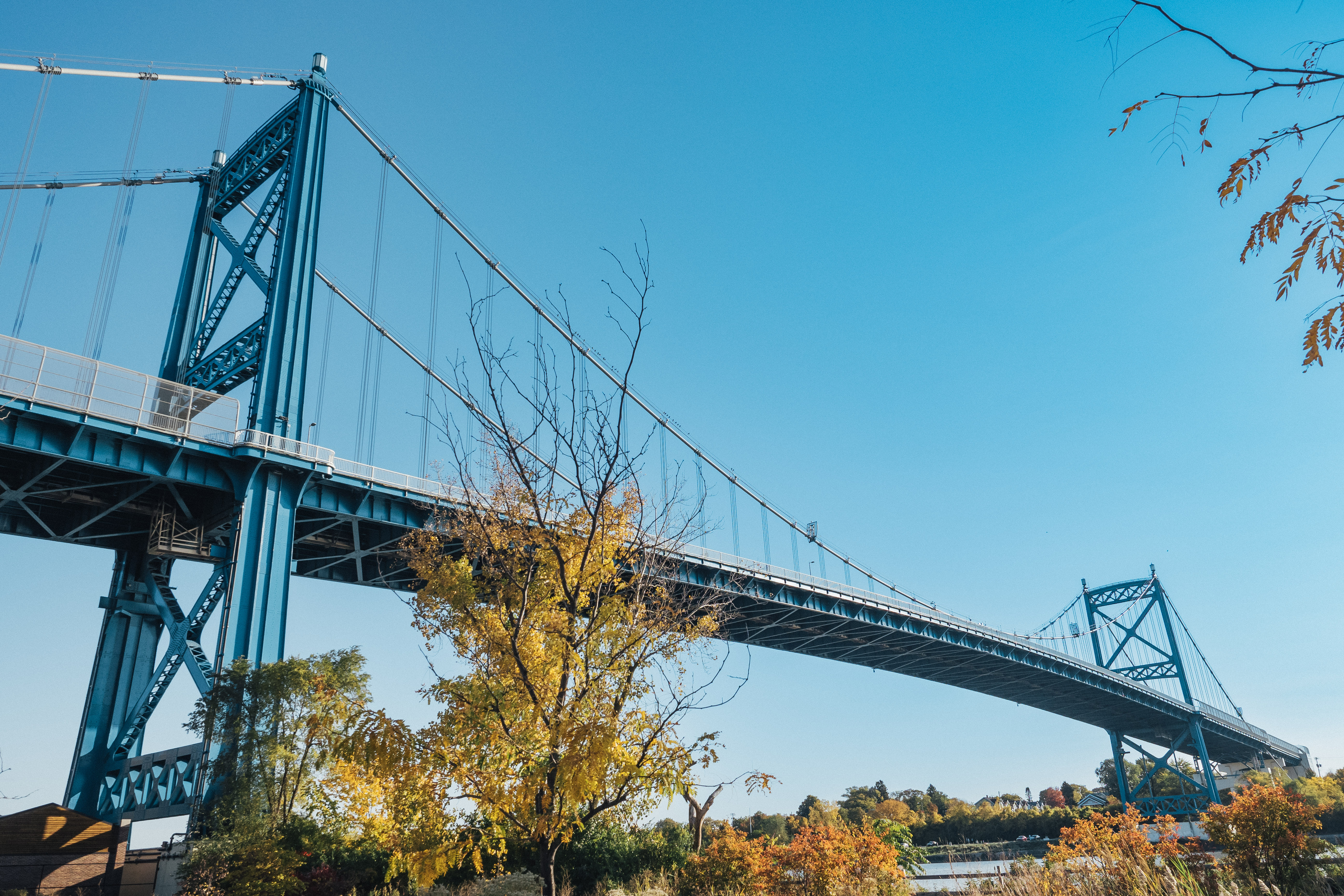
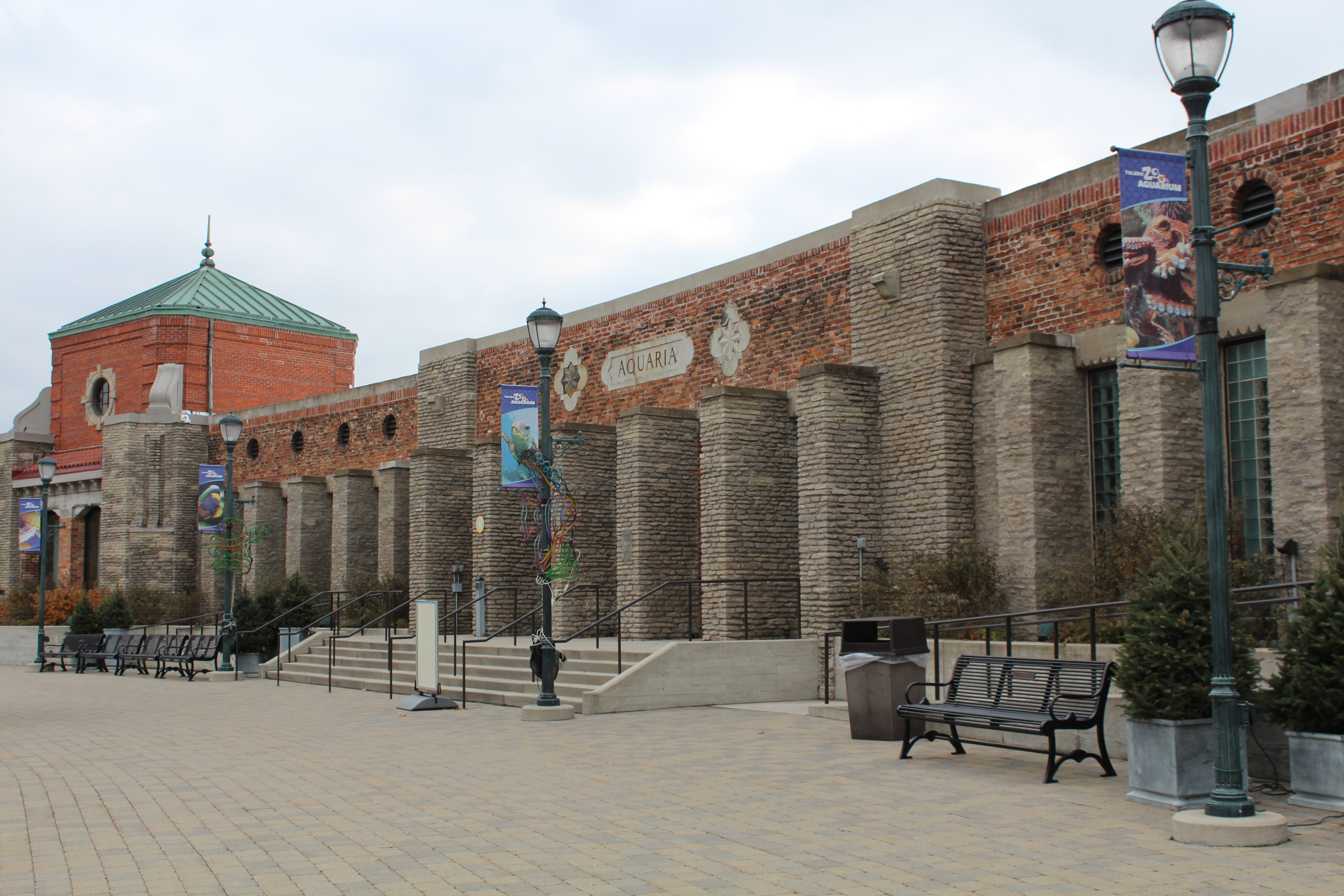
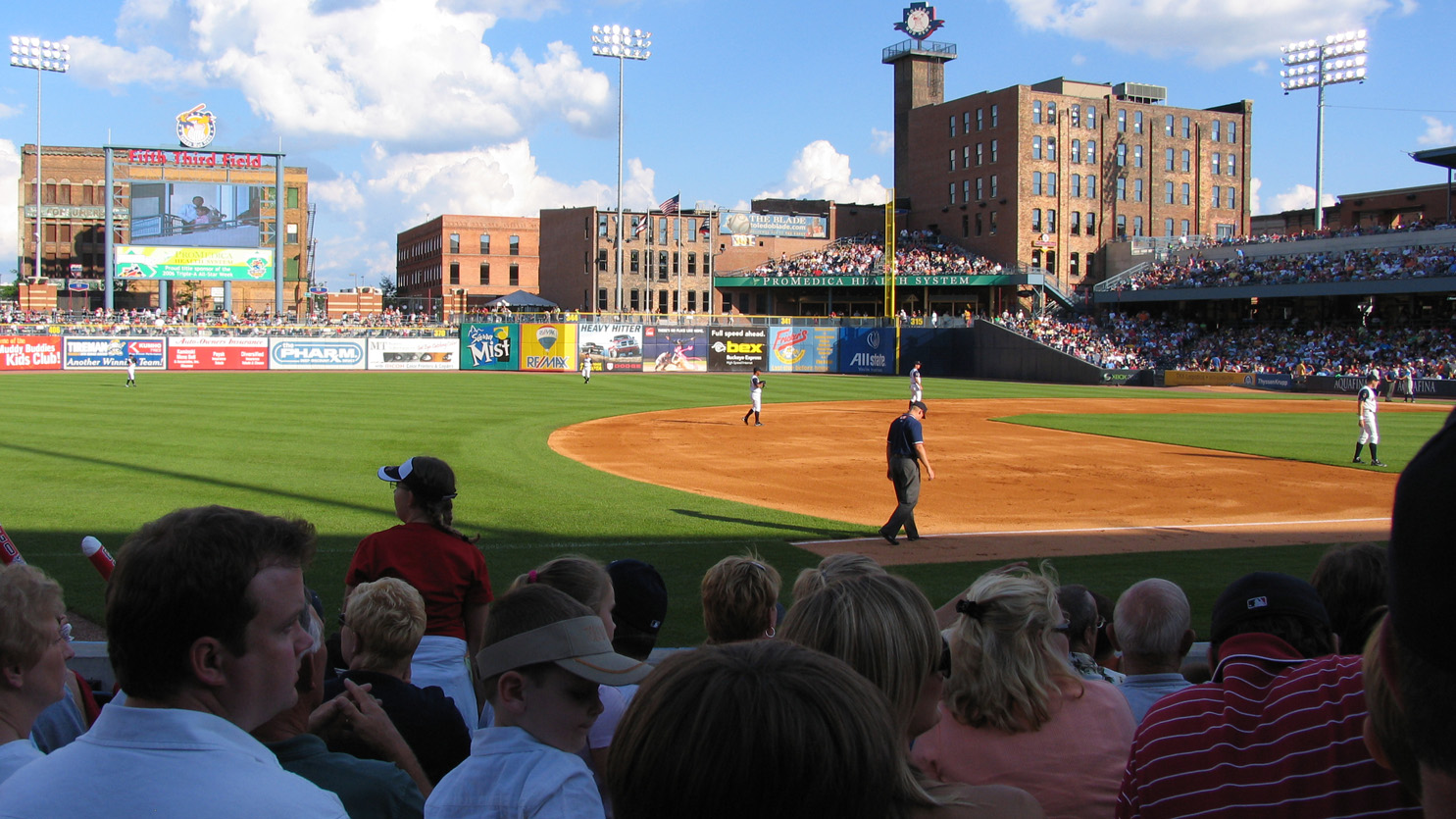
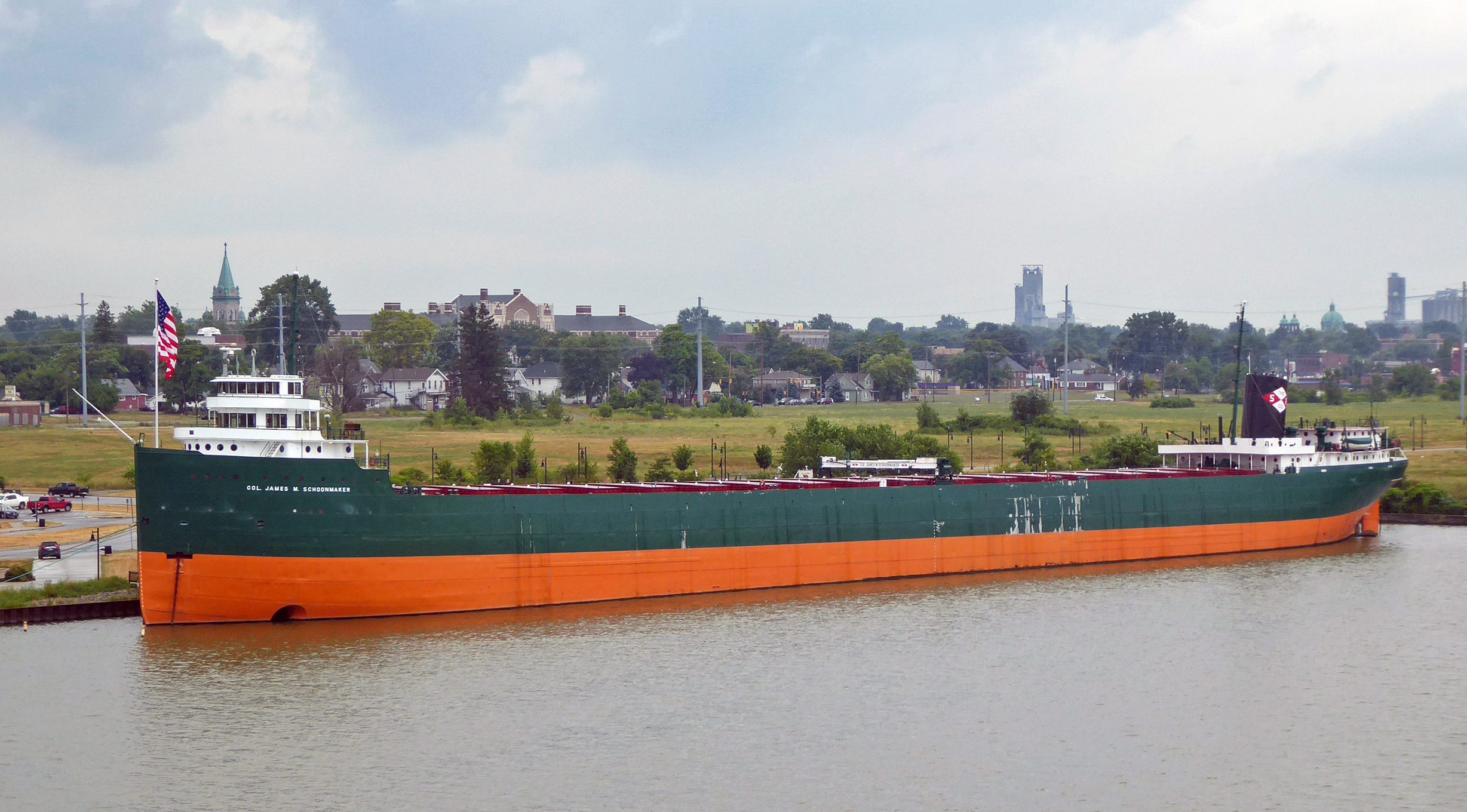
- Downtown Toledo Toledo Museum of Art Lucas County Courthouse Anthony Wayne Bridge Toledo Zoo & Aquarium Fifth Third Field SS Col. James M. Schoonmaker

- Flag Seal Logo
- Nickname: The Glass City
- Motto: "Laborare est Orare" (To Work is to Pray)
- Interactive map of Toledo, Ohio
- Location within Ohio Location within the United States
- Coordinates: 41°39′10″N 83°32′16″W
- Country: United States
- State: Ohio
- County: Lucas
- Founded: 1837

Government
  - Body: Toledo City Council
  - Mayor: Wade Kapszukiewicz (D)

Area
  - City: 83.83 sq mi (217.12 km^{2})
  - Land: 80.49 sq mi (208.46 km^{2})
  - Water: 3.34 sq mi (8.66 km^{2})
- Elevation: 604 ft (184 m)

Population (2020)
  - City: 270,871
  - Estimate (2025): 263,423 ▼
  - Rank: US: 86th
  - Density: 3,365.4/sq mi (1,299.38/km^{2})
  - Urban: 497,952 (US: 85th)
  - Urban density: 2,069/sq mi (798.7/km^{2})
  - Metro: 606,240 (US: 93rd)
- Demonym: Toledoan
- Time zone: UTC−5 (EST)
  - Summer (DST): UTC−4 (EDT)
- ZIP Codes: Zip codes: 43601, 43603-43615, 43617, 43620, 43623, 43635, 43652, 43654, 43656-43657, 43659-43661, 43666-43667, 43681-43682, 43697, 43699
- Area codes: 419, 567
- FIPS code: 39-77000
- GNIS ID: 1086537
- Website: toledo.oh.gov

Toledo (/təˈliːdoʊ/ tə-LEE-doh) is a city in Lucas County, Ohio, United States, of which it is also the county seat. It is located at the western end of Lake Erie along the Maumee River. Toledo is the 4th-most populous city in Ohio and 88th-most populous city in the U.S., with a population of 270,871 at the 2020 census. The Toledo metropolitan area has an estimated 601,000 residents. Toledo also serves as a major trade center for the Midwest; its port is the fifth-busiest on the Great Lakes.

The city was founded in 1833 on the west bank of the Maumee River and originally incorporated as part of the Michigan Territory. It was re-founded in 1837 after the conclusion of the Toledo War, when it was incorporated in Ohio. After the 1845 completion of the Miami and Erie Canal, Toledo grew quickly; it also benefited from its position on the railway line between New York City and Chicago. The first of many glass manufacturers arrived in the 1880s, eventually earning Toledo its nickname as "The Glass City". Downtown Toledo has been subject to major revitalization efforts, including a growing entertainment district. Toledo is home to the University of Toledo.

== History ==
The region was part of a larger area controlled by the historic tribes of the Wyandot and the people of the Council of Three Fires (Ojibwe, Potawatomi, and Odawa). The French established trading posts in the area by 1680 to take advantage of the lucrative fur trade. The Odawa moved from Manitoulin Island and the Bruce Peninsula at the invitation of the French, who established a trading post at Fort Detroit, about 60 miles to the north. They settled an area extending into northwest Ohio.

=== 18th century ===
By the early 18th century, the Odawa-occupied areas along most of the Maumee River to its mouth. They served as middlemen between the French and tribes further to the west and north. The Wyandot occupied central Ohio, and the Shawnee and Lenape occupied the southern areas.

When the city of Toledo was preparing to pave its streets, it surveyed "two prehistoric semicircular earthworks, presumably for stockades." One was at the intersection of Clayton and Oliver Streets on the south bank of Swan Creek; the other was at the intersection of Fassett and Fort Streets on the right bank of the Maumee River. Such earthworks were typical of mound-building peoples.

=== 19th century ===
According to Charles E. Slocum, the American military built Fort Industry at the mouth of the Swan Creek at about 1805 as a temporary stockade. No official reports support the 19th-century tradition of its earlier history there.

The United States continued to work to transition the area's population from Native Americans to Whites. In the Treaty of Detroit (1807), the above four tribes ceded a large land area to the United States of what became southeastern Michigan and northwestern Ohio, to the mouth of the Maumee River (where Toledo later developed). Reserves for the Odawa were set aside in northwestern Ohio for a limited time. The Native Americans signed the treaty at Detroit, Michigan, on November 17, 1807, with William Hull, governor of the Michigan Territory and superintendent of Indian affairs, as the sole representative of the U.S.

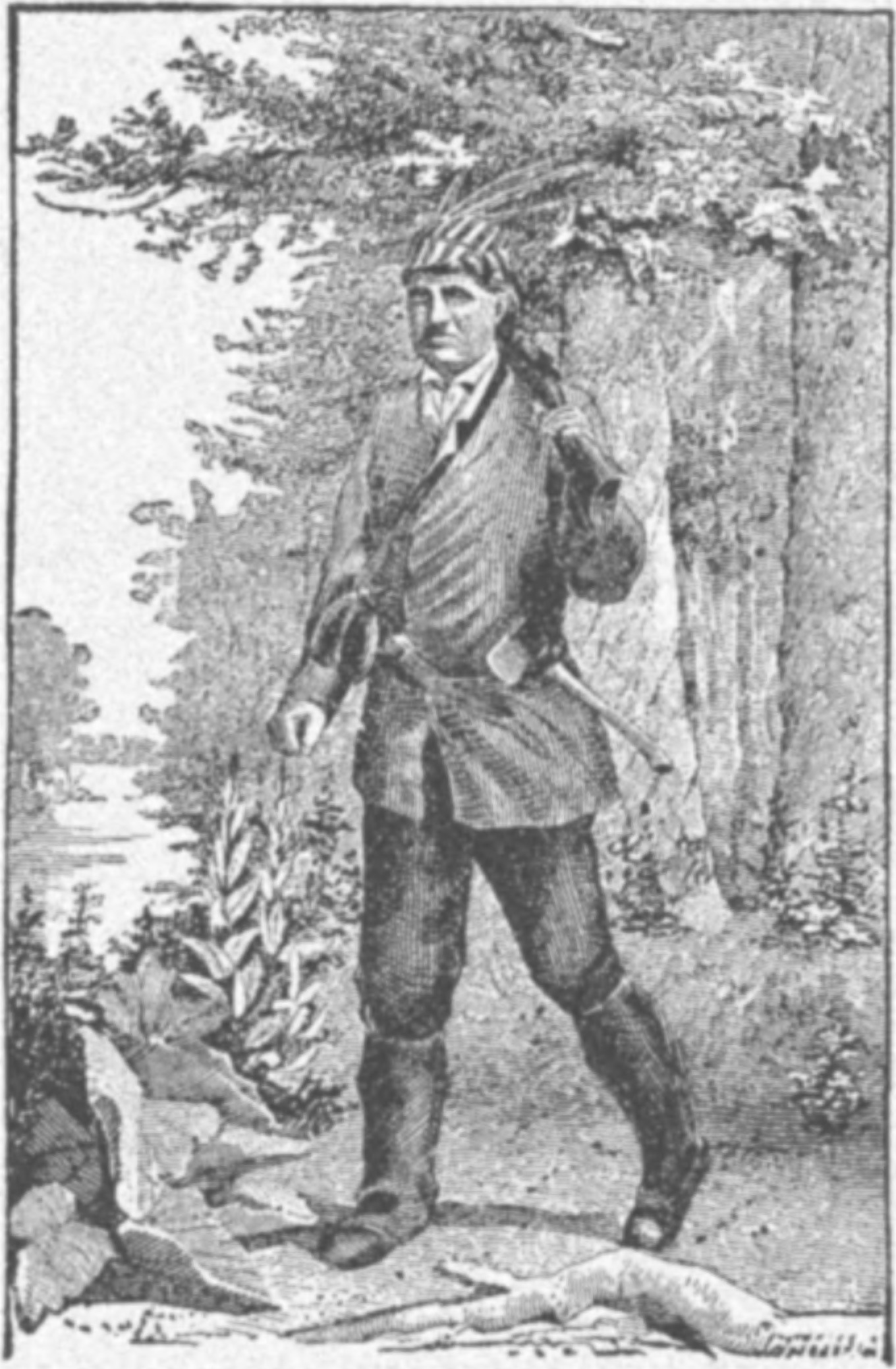
Peter Navarre, frontiersman, hero of the Battle of Lake Erie

More American settlers entered the area over the next few years, but many fled during the War of 1812, when British forces raided the area with their Native American allies. Resettlement began around 1818 after a Cincinnati syndicate purchased a 974-acre (3.9 km^{2}) tract at the mouth of Swan Creek and named it Port Lawrence, developing it as the modern downtown area of Toledo. Immediately to the north of that, another syndicate founded the town of Vistula, the historic north end. These two towns bordered each other across Cherry Street. This is why present-day streets on the street's northeast side run at a slightly different angle from those southwest of it.

In 1824, the Ohio state legislature authorized the construction of the Miami and Erie Canal, and in 1833, its Wabash and Erie Canal extension. The canal's purpose was to connect the city of Cincinnati to Lake Erie for water transportation to eastern markets, including to New York City via the Erie Canal and Hudson River. At that time, no highways had been built in the state, and goods produced locally had great difficulty reaching the larger markets east of the Appalachian Mountains. During the canal's planning phase, many small towns along the northern shores of the Maumee River heavily competed to be the ending terminus of the canal, knowing it would give them a profitable status. The towns of Port Lawrence and Vistula merged in 1833 to better compete against the upriver towns of Waterville and Maumee.

The inhabitants of this joined settlement chose the name Toledo:

"but the reason for this choice is buried in a welter of legends. One recounts that Washington Irving, who was traveling in Spain at the time, suggested the name to his brother, a local resident; this explanation ignores the fact that Irving returned to the United States in 1832. Others award the honor to Two Stickney, son of the major who quaintly numbered his sons and named his daughters after States. The most popular version attributes the naming to Willard J. Daniels, a merchant, who reportedly suggested Toledo because it 'is easy to pronounce, is pleasant in sound, and there is no other city of that name on the American continent.'"

Despite Toledo's efforts, the canal built the final terminus in Manhattan, one-half mile (800 m) to the north of Toledo, because it was closer to Lake Erie. As a compromise, the state placed two sidecuts before the terminus, one in Toledo at Swan Creek and another in Maumee, about 10 miles to the southwest.

Among the numerous treaties made between the Ottawa and the United States were two signed in this area: at Miami (Maumee) Bay in 1831 and Maumee, Ohio, upriver of Toledo, in 1833. These actions were among US purchases or exchanges of land to accomplish Indian Removal of the Ottawa from areas wanted for European-American settlement. The last of the Odawa did not leave this area until 1839, when Ottoke, grandson of Pontiac, led his band from their village at the mouth of the Maumee River to Indian Territory in Kansas.

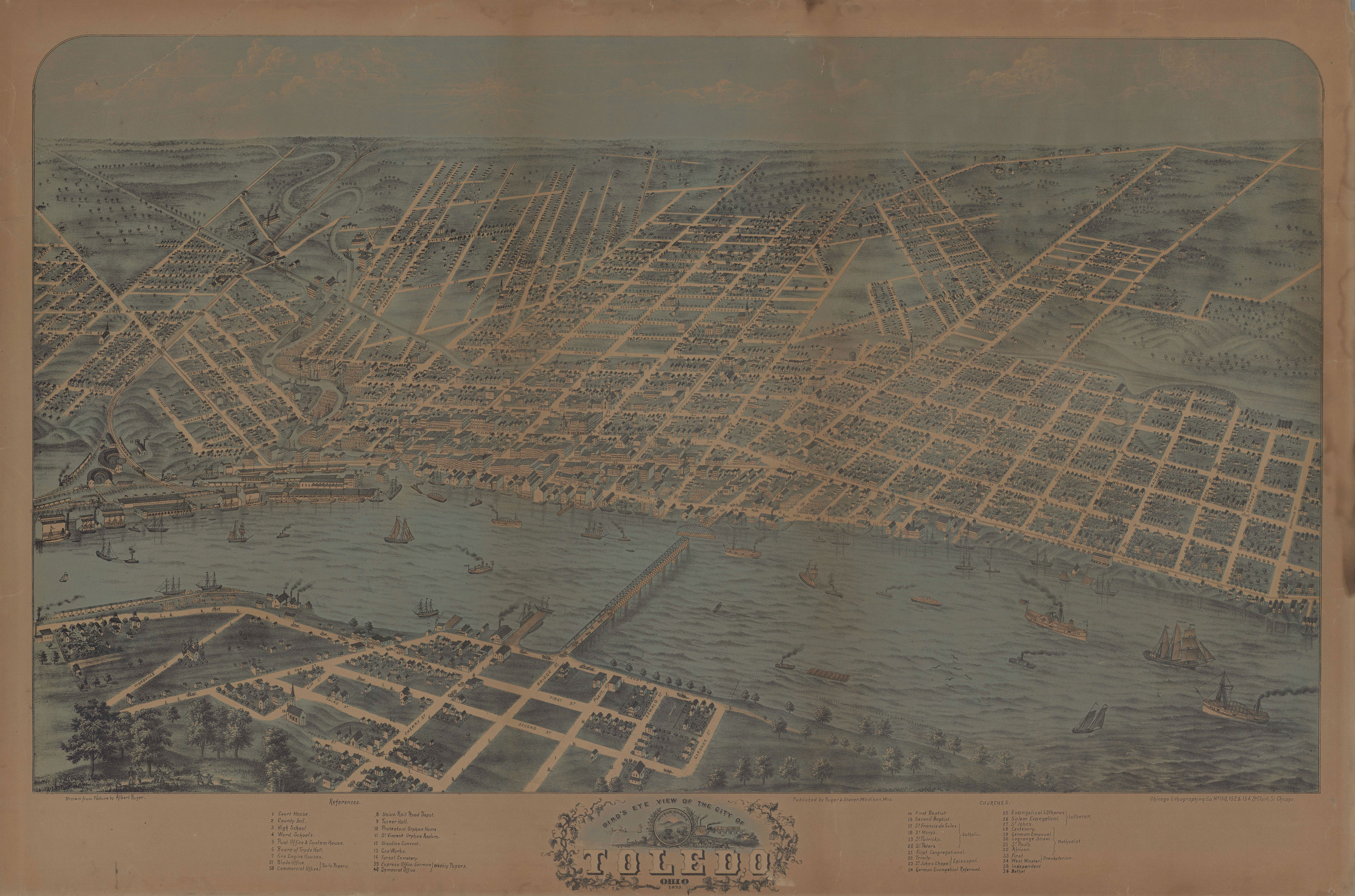
Bird's-eye view of Toledo drawn in 1870

An almost bloodless conflict between Ohio and the Michigan Territory, called the Toledo War (1835–1836), was "fought" over a narrow strip of land from the Indiana border to Lake Erie, now containing the city and the suburbs of Sylvania and Oregon, Ohio. The strip, which varied between five and eight miles (13 km) in width, was claimed by both the state of Ohio and the Michigan Territory due to conflicting legislation concerning the location of the Ohio-Michigan state line. Militias from both states were sent to the border, but never engaged. The only casualty of the conflict was a Michigan deputy sheriff—stabbed in the leg with a penknife by Two Stickney during the arrest of his elder brother, One Stickney, and the loss of two horses, two pigs, and a few chickens stolen from an Ohio farm by lost members of the Michigan militia. Major Benjamin Franklin Stickney, father of One and Two Stickney, had been instrumental in pushing Congress to rule in favor of Ohio gaining Toledo. In the end, the state of Ohio was awarded the land after the state of Michigan was given a larger portion of the Upper Peninsula in exchange. Stickney Avenue in Toledo is named for Major Stickney.

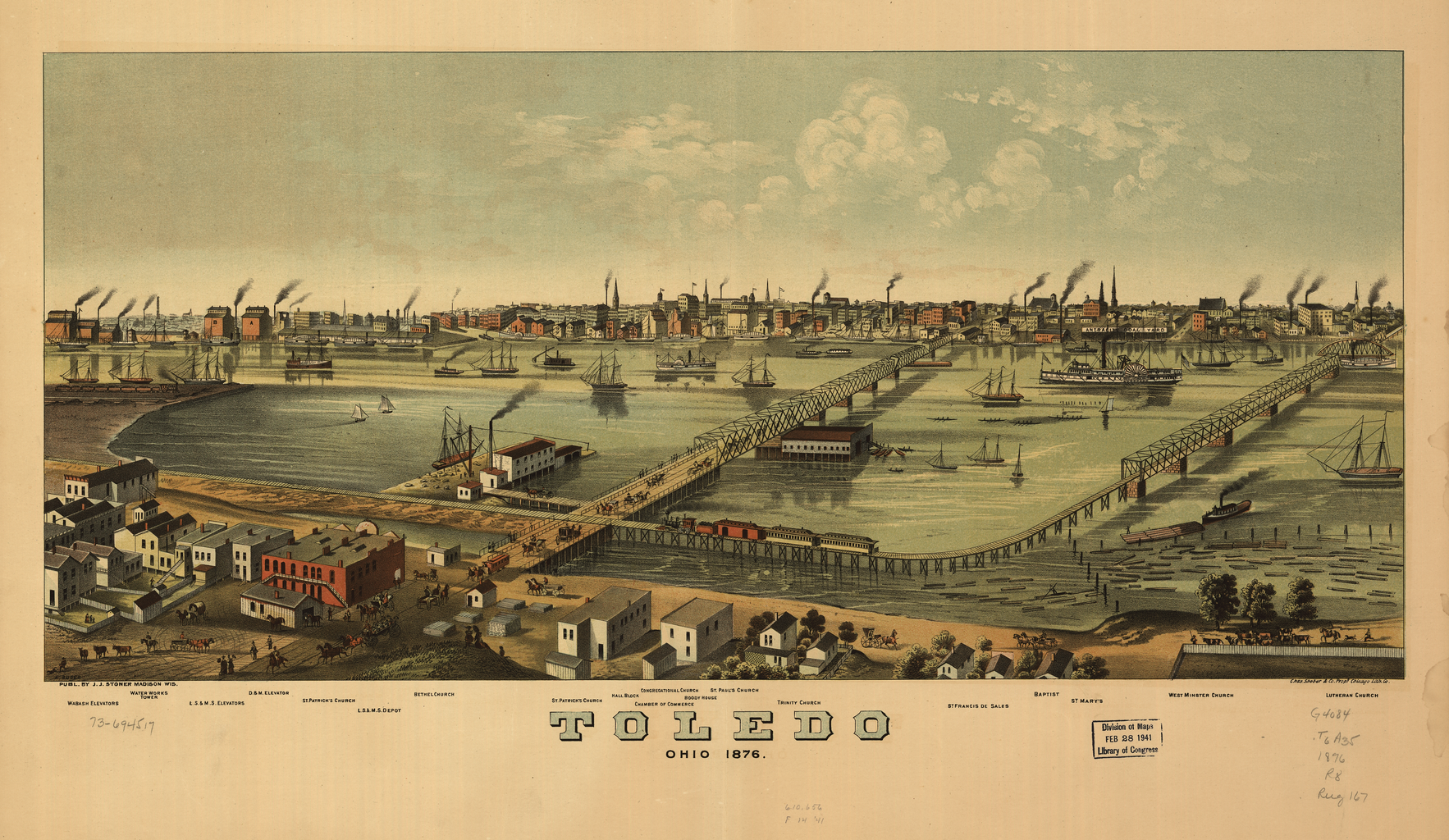
A postcard of Toledo in 1876

Toledo was very slow to expand during its first two decades of settlement. The first lot was sold in the Port Lawrence section of the city in 1833. It held 1,205 persons in 1835, and five years later, it had gained just seven more persons. Settlers came and went quickly through Toledo and between 1833 and 1836, ownership of land had changed so many times that none of the original parties remained in the town. The canal and its Toledo side-cut entrance were completed in 1843. Soon after the canal was functional, the new canal boats had become too large to use the shallow waters at the terminus in Manhattan. More boats began using the Swan Creek side-cut than its official terminus, quickly putting the Manhattan warehouses out of business and triggering a rush to move business to Toledo. Most of Manhattan's residents moved out by 1844.

The 1850 census recorded Toledo as having 3,829 residents and Manhattan 541. The 1860 census shows Toledo with a population of 13,768 and Manhattan with 788. While the towns were only a mile apart, Toledo grew by 359% in 10 years. Manhattan's growth was on a small base and never competed, given the drawbacks of its lesser canal outlet. By the 1880s, Toledo expanded over the vacant streets of Manhattan and Tremainsville, a small town to the west.

In the last half of the 19th century, railroads slowly began to replace canals as the major form of transportation. They were faster and had greater capacity. Toledo soon became a hub for several railroad companies and a hotspot for industries such as furniture producers, carriage makers, breweries, and glass manufacturers. Large immigrant populations came to the area.

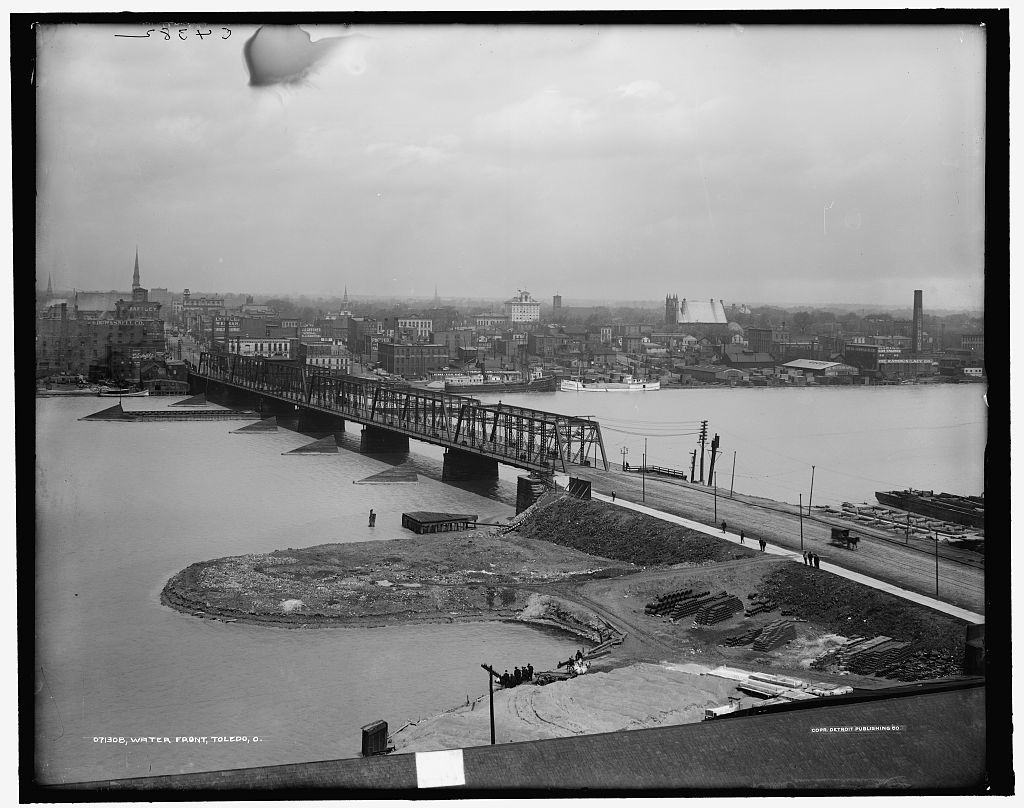
Toledo around 1905, showing growing industry along the Maumee River

=== 20th century ===
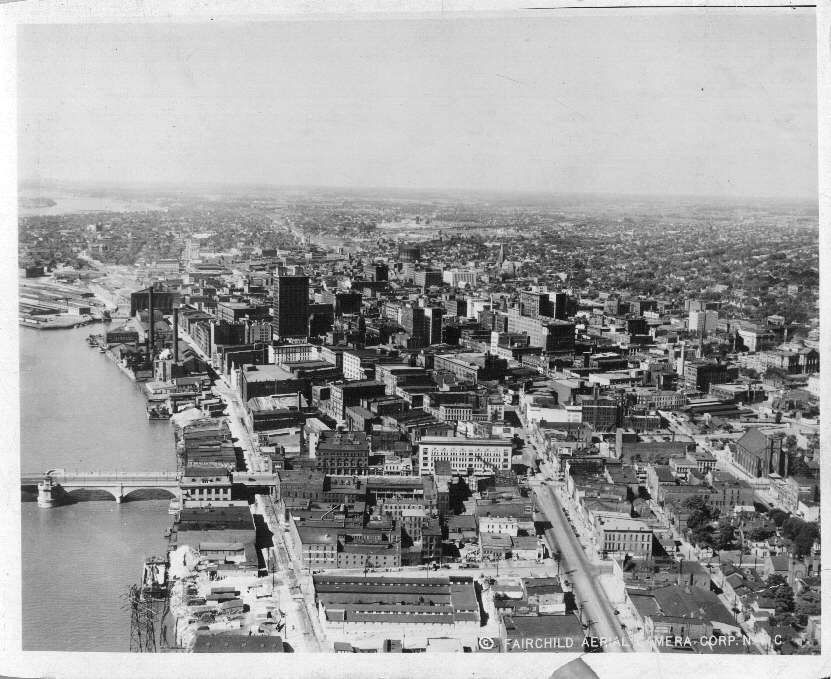
Downtown Toledo in 1920, including the then-recently completed Cherry Street Bridge

In the 1920s, Toledo had one of the highest rates of industrial growth in the United States.

Toledo continued to expand in population and industry, but because of its dependence on manufacturing, the city was hit hard by the Great Depression. Many large-scale Works Progress Administration projects were constructed to re-employ citizens in the 1930s. Some of these include the amphitheater and aquarium at the Toledo Zoo and a major expansion to the Toledo Museum of Art.

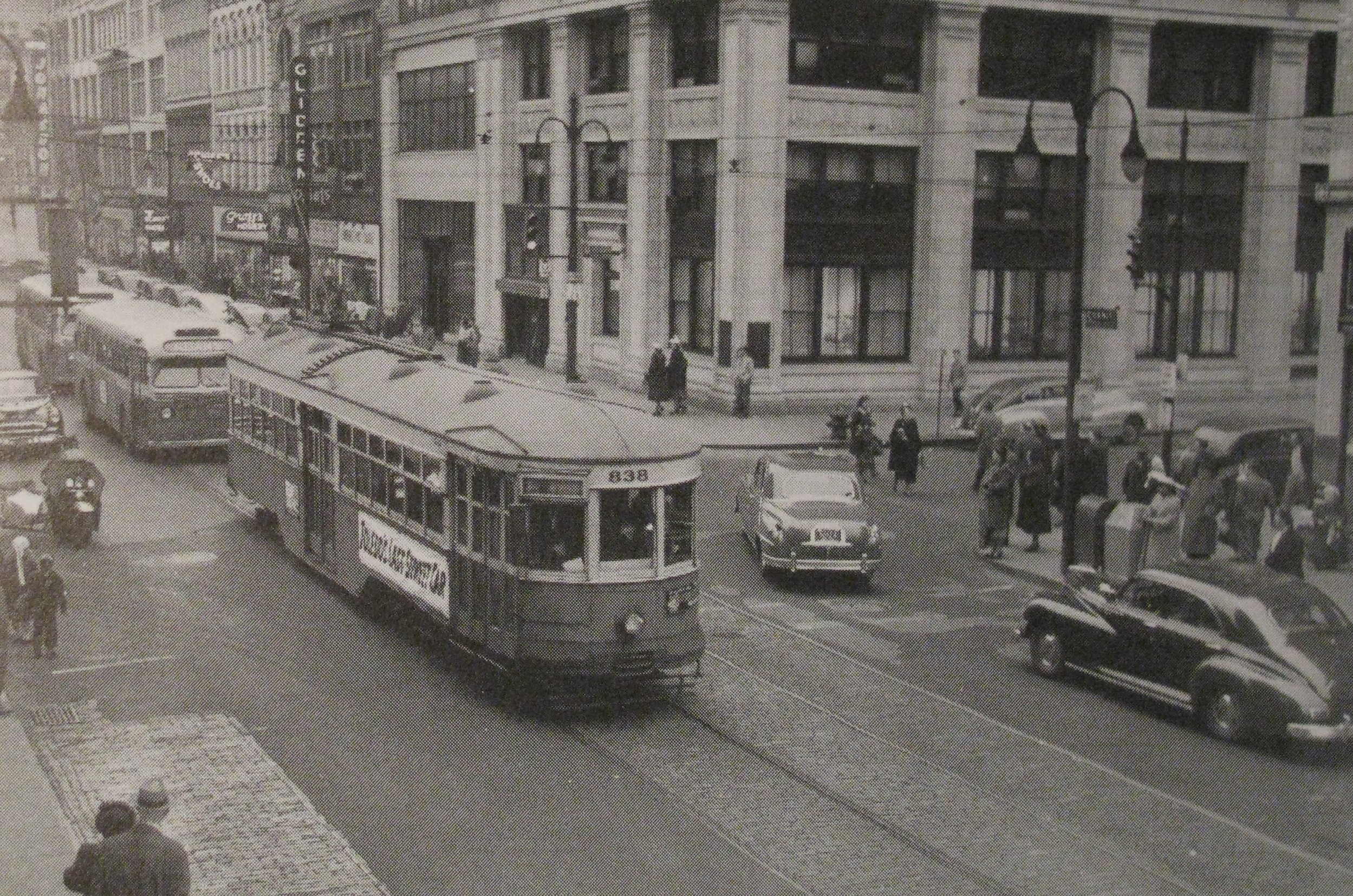
A streetcar in Toledo, 1949

The postwar job boom and Great Migration brought thousands of African Americans to Toledo to work in industrial jobs, where they had previously been denied. Due to redlining, many of them settled along Dorr Street, which, during the 1950s and 1960s was lined with flourishing black-owned businesses and homes. Desegregation, a failed urban renewal project, and the construction of I-75 displaced those residents and left behind a struggling community with minimal resources, even as it also drew more established, middle-class people, white and black, out of center cities for newer housing. The city rebounded, but the slump of American manufacturing in the second half of the 20th century during industrial restructuring cost many jobs.

By the 1980s, Toledo had a depressed economy. The destruction of many buildings downtown, along with several failed business ventures in housing in the core, which led to a reverse city-suburb wealth problem common in small cities with land to spare.

=== 21st century ===
Several initiatives have been taken by Toledo's citizens to improve the cityscape by urban gardening and revitalizing their communities. Local artists, supported by organizations like the Arts Commission of Greater Toledo and the Ohio Arts Council, have contributed an array of murals and beautification works to replace long standing blight. Many downtown historical buildings such as the Oliver House and Stand-art Lofts have been renovated into restaurants, condominiums, offices and art galleries.

On the evening of August 1, 2014, the city of Toledo issued a warning to citizens advising against the use of city water, leaving more than half a million people suddenly without water. A bloom of toxic blue-green algae had formed directly over Toledo's water intake pipe, which was situated a few miles off shore in Lake Erie. Because of the algae bloom forming just above the pipe, the water being pumped into Toledo showed levels of harmful bacteria that made the water unsafe to interact with. On August 3, the Ohio National Guard was brought in to deliver over 10,000 gallons of water to citizens due to a rapid depletion of bottled water locally. The warning against using water lasted nearly three days, finally ending late on August 4.

In 2018, Cleveland-Cliffs, Inc. invested $700 million into an East Toledo location as the site of a new hot-briquetted iron plant, designed to modernize the steel industry. The plant was slated to create over 1,200 jobs. Construction was completed in 2020, as planned.

== Geography ==
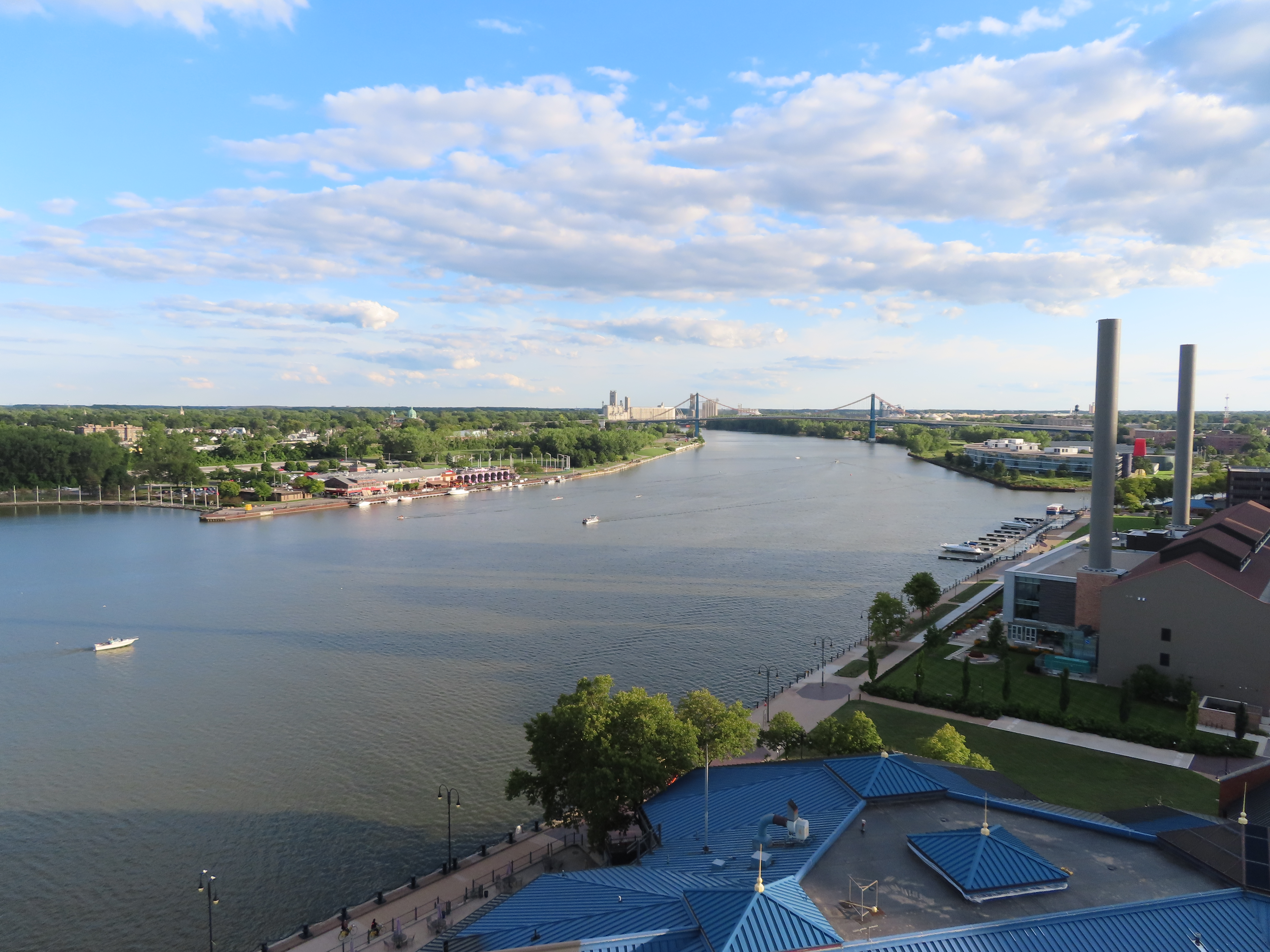
The Maumee River as it passes through Toledo

Toledo is located at 41°39′10″N 83°32′16″W (41.6525, −83.5375). The city has a total area of 84.12 square miles (217.87 km^{2}), of which 3.43 square miles (8.88 km^{2}) is covered by water.

The city straddles the Maumee River at its mouth at the southern end of Maumee Bay, the westernmost inlet of Lake Erie. The city is located north of what had been the Great Black Swamp, giving rise to another nickname, Frog Town. Toledo sits within the borders of a sandy oak savanna called the Oak Openings Region, an important ecological site that once comprised more than 300 square miles (780 km^{2}).

Toledo is within 250 miles (400 km) by road from seven metropolitan areas that have a population of more than two million people: Detroit, Cleveland, Columbus, Cincinnati, Pittsburgh, Indianapolis, and Chicago. In addition, it is within 300 miles (480 km) west of Toronto, Ontario, Canada.

=== Cityscape ===
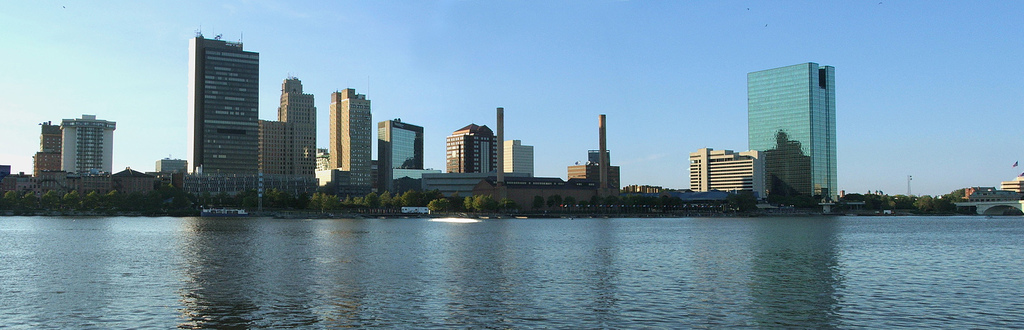
Downtown Toledo's skyline from across the Maumee River

==== Neighborhoods and suburbs ====
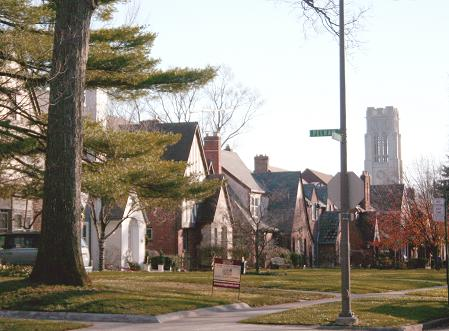
Old Orchard neighborhood

The Old West End is a historic neighborhood of Victorian, Arts & Crafts, and other Edwardian-style houses made in the era. The historic district is listed on the National Register of Historic Places.

- Beverly
- Birmingham
- Darby (Eastern to South-Old South End)
- DeVeaux
- Crossgates
- Five Points
- Downtown
- East Toledo
- Franklin Park
- Garfield
- Glendale-Heatherdowns (Byrne-Heatherdowns Village)
- Harvard Terrace
- Junction Neighborhood
- Library Village
- Nasby
- North Towne
- Old Orchard
- Old West End
- Old South End
- Old Town
- ONE Village (includes the Polish International Village, Vistula, & North River)
- ONYX (includes historic Kuschwantz and Lenk's Hill neighborhoods)
- Ottawa
- Point Place
- Reynolds Corners
- Roosevelt
- Scott Park
- Secor Gardens (includes the University of Toledo)
- Southwyck
- Wernert's Corner
- Trilby
- University Hills
- Uptown
- Warehouse District
- Warren Sherman
- Westgate
- Westmoreland

On January 15, 1936, the first building to be completely covered in glass was constructed in Toledo. It was a building for the Owens-Illinois Glass Company and marked a milestone in architectural design representative of the International style of architecture, which was at that time becoming increasingly popular in the US.

According to the US Census Bureau, the Toledo metropolitan area covers three Ohio counties. Some of Toledo's suburbs in Ohio include Bowling Green, Holland, Lake Township, Maumee, Millbury, Monclova Township, Northwood, Oregon, Ottawa Hills, Perrysburg, Rossford, Springfield Township, Sylvania, Walbridge, Waterville, Whitehouse, and Washington Township. Bedford Township, Michigan, including the communities of Lambertville, Temperance, and Erie Township, includes Toledo's Michigan suburbs.

=== Climate ===
Toledo, as with much of the Great Lakes region, has a humid continental climate (Köppen Dfa), characterized by four distinct seasons. Lake Erie moderates the climate somewhat, especially in late spring and fall, when air and water temperature differences are maximal. However, this effect is lessened in the winter because Lake Erie (unlike the other Great Lakes) usually freezes over, coupled with prevailing winds that are often westerly, and in the summer, prevailing winds south and west over the lake bring heat and humidity to the city.

Summers are very warm and humid, with July averaging 75.4 °F (24.1 °C) and temperatures of 90 °F (32 °C) or more seen on 18.8 days. Winters are cold and somewhat snowy, with a January mean temperature of 27.5 °F (−2.5 °C), and lows at or below 0 °F (−18 °C) on 5.6 nights. The spring months tend to be the wettest time of year, although precipitation is common year-round. November and December can get very cloudy, but January and February usually clear up after the lake freezes. July is the sunniest month overall. About 37 inches (94 cm) of snow falls per year, much less than the Snow Belt cities, because of the prevailing wind direction. Temperature extremes have ranged from −20 °F (−29 °C) on January 21, 1984, to 105 °F (41 °C) on July 14, 1936.

Climate data for Toledo, Ohio (Toledo Express Airport), 1991−2020 normals, (Note: Mean monthly maxima and minima (i.e. the highest and lowest temperature readings during an entire month or year) calculated based on data at said location from 1991 to 2020.) extremes 1871−present (Note: Official records for Toledo were kept at downtown from January 1871 to January 1943, Toledo Municipal Airport from February 1943 to December 1945, Metcalf Field from January 1946 to January 11, 1955, and at Toledo Express Airport since January 12, 1955. For more information, see ThreadEx.)
| Month | Jan | Feb | Mar | Apr | May | Jun | Jul | Aug | Sep | Oct | Nov | Dec | Year |
|---|---|---|---|---|---|---|---|---|---|---|---|---|---|
| Record high °F (°C) | 71 (22) | 73 (23) | 85 (29) | 89 (32) | 98 (37) | 104 (40) | 105 (41) | 103 (39) | 100 (38) | 92 (33) | 80 (27) | 70 (21) | 105 (41) |
| Mean maximum °F (°C) | 54.9 (12.7) | 57.8 (14.3) | 70.4 (21.3) | 80.3 (26.8) | 88.7 (31.5) | 94.4 (34.7) | 94.2 (34.6) | 92.4 (33.6) | 90.3 (32.4) | 82.2 (27.9) | 68.1 (20.1) | 57.8 (14.3) | 96.2 (35.7) |
| Mean daily maximum °F (°C) | 34.7 (1.5) | 37.8 (3.2) | 48.4 (9.1) | 61.5 (16.4) | 73.3 (22.9) | 82.7 (28.2) | 86.5 (30.3) | 84.1 (28.9) | 77.7 (25.4) | 65.0 (18.3) | 51.1 (10.6) | 39.4 (4.1) | 61.9 (16.6) |
| Daily mean °F (°C) | 27.5 (−2.5) | 29.9 (−1.2) | 39.2 (4.0) | 50.9 (10.5) | 62.1 (16.7) | 71.6 (22.0) | 75.4 (24.1) | 73.5 (23.1) | 66.4 (19.1) | 54.6 (12.6) | 42.8 (6.0) | 32.8 (0.4) | 52.2 (11.2) |
| Mean daily minimum °F (°C) | 20.3 (−6.5) | 22.1 (−5.5) | 29.9 (−1.2) | 40.3 (4.6) | 50.9 (10.5) | 60.5 (15.8) | 64.2 (17.9) | 62.8 (17.1) | 55.1 (12.8) | 44.3 (6.8) | 34.5 (1.4) | 26.1 (−3.3) | 42.6 (5.9) |
| Mean minimum °F (°C) | −1.8 (−18.8) | 2.1 (−16.6) | 10.4 (−12.0) | 24.2 (−4.3) | 35.4 (1.9) | 45.1 (7.3) | 51.9 (11.1) | 50.4 (10.2) | 39.3 (4.1) | 28.7 (−1.8) | 17.7 (−7.9) | 5.9 (−14.5) | −5.1 (−20.6) |
| Record low °F (°C) | −20 (−29) | −19 (−28) | −10 (−23) | 8 (−13) | 25 (−4) | 32 (0) | 40 (4) | 34 (1) | 26 (−3) | 15 (−9) | 2 (−17) | −19 (−28) | −20 (−29) |
| Average precipitation inches (mm) | 2.37 (60) | 2.28 (58) | 2.61 (66) | 3.45 (88) | 3.82 (97) | 3.45 (88) | 3.27 (83) | 3.15 (80) | 2.93 (74) | 2.59 (66) | 2.65 (67) | 2.44 (62) | 35.01 (889) |
| Average snowfall inches (cm) | 12.3 (31) | 10.2 (26) | 5.3 (13) | 1.3 (3.3) | 0.0 (0.0) | 0.0 (0.0) | 0.0 (0.0) | 0.0 (0.0) | 0.0 (0.0) | 0.1 (0.25) | 1.7 (4.3) | 6.5 (17) | 37.4 (95) |
| Average extreme snow depth inches (cm) | 5 (13) | 5 (13) | 3 (7.6) | 0 (0) | 0 (0) | 0 (0) | 0 (0) | 0 (0) | 0 (0) | 0 (0) | 1 (2.5) | 3 (7.6) | 5 (13) |
| Average precipitation days (≥ 0.01 in) | 13.5 | 10.9 | 11.5 | 12.3 | 12.9 | 10.6 | 9.6 | 9.3 | 9.1 | 10.7 | 10.5 | 12.2 | 133.1 |
| Average snowy days (≥ 0.1 in) | 9.2 | 7.8 | 4.3 | 1.2 | 0.0 | 0.0 | 0.0 | 0.0 | 0.0 | 0.1 | 2.0 | 6.3 | 30.9 |
| Average relative humidity (%) | 74.2 | 72.9 | 70.5 | 66.2 | 66.3 | 69.0 | 71.8 | 75.6 | 76.2 | 72.5 | 75.6 | 78.6 | 72.4 |
| Mean monthly sunshine hours | 126.0 | 142.2 | 183.7 | 213.7 | 265.9 | 288.2 | 299.3 | 263.7 | 220.3 | 180.4 | 106.5 | 90.2 | 2,380.1 |
| Percentage possible sunshine | 43 | 48 | 50 | 53 | 59 | 63 | 65 | 62 | 59 | 52 | 36 | 32 | 53 |
| Average ultraviolet index | 1 | 2 | 4 | 6 | 7 | 9 | 9 | 8 | 6 | 4 | 2 | 1 | 5 |
Source 1: NOAA (relative humidity and sun 1961−1990)
Source 2: Weather Atlas

=== Algae blooms ===
Harmful blooms of cyanobacteria, or blue-green algae, were so extremely bad in the 1960s that Lake Erie was mocked as a dead zone, said to have "no life". However, through clean water rules the lake was revived. Algal blooms have returned and have been negatively affecting Lake Erie since the late 1990s. Heightened levels of blue-green algae can affect both human and ecosystem health by causing fish to die and the water to be discolored and foul smelling, and oxygen-deficient dead zones may even start to form. Sometimes the blooms are so thick that they slow boats. These large blooms are caused by agricultural runoff flowing into the lake. Agricultural runoff dumps phosphorus into the western basin of Lake Erie and acts as a fertilizer for the blue-green algae, and the warmer weather seen in July through October in Northern Ohio helps speed up the growing process. Because of Toledo's closeness to the lake, Toledo citizens are affected each year. Algal blooms can cause water bills to increase in this area $100 per year for a family of five. The effects of these blooms go beyond higher water bills, as heightened blooms can even shut down parts of the economy, such as tourism and fishing industries, and cause property values to drop, costing the local economy tens of millions of dollars.

== Demographics ==
In 1870, 75.3% of Toledo's foreign-born population were from Germany and Ireland.

Historical population
| Census | Pop. | Note | %± |
|---|---|---|---|
| 1840 | 1,222 | | — |
| 1850 | 3,829 | | 213.3% |
| 1860 | 13,768 | | 259.6% |
| 1870 | 31,584 | | 129.4% |
| 1880 | 50,137 | | 58.7% |
| 1890 | 81,434 | | 62.4% |
| 1900 | 131,822 | | 61.9% |
| 1910 | 168,497 | | 27.8% |
| 1920 | 243,164 | | 44.3% |
| 1930 | 290,718 | | 19.6% |
| 1940 | 282,349 | | −2.9% |
| 1950 | 303,616 | | 7.5% |
| 1960 | 318,003 | | 4.7% |
| 1970 | 383,818 | | 20.7% |
| 1980 | 354,635 | | −7.6% |
| 1990 | 332,943 | | −6.1% |
| 2000 | 313,619 | | −5.8% |
| 2010 | 287,208 | | −8.4% |
| 2020 | 270,871 | | −5.7% |
| 2025 (est.) | 263,423 | ▼ | −2.7% |
U.S. Decennial Census 2020 census

| Historical racial composition | 2020 | 2010 | 2000 | 1990 | 1970 | 1940 |
|---|---|---|---|---|---|---|
| White | 62.6% | 64.8% | 70.2% | 77.0% | 85.7% | 94.8% |
| —Non-Hispanic | 58.7% | 61.4% | Unk | 75.1% | 84.0% | n/a |
| Black or African American | 27.4% | 27.2% | 23.5% | 19.7% | 13.8% | 5.2% |
| Hispanic or Latino (of any race) | 8.6% | 7.4% | 5.5% | 4.0% | 1.9% | n/a |
| Asian | 1.3% | 1.1% | 1.0% | 1.0% | 0.2% | − |

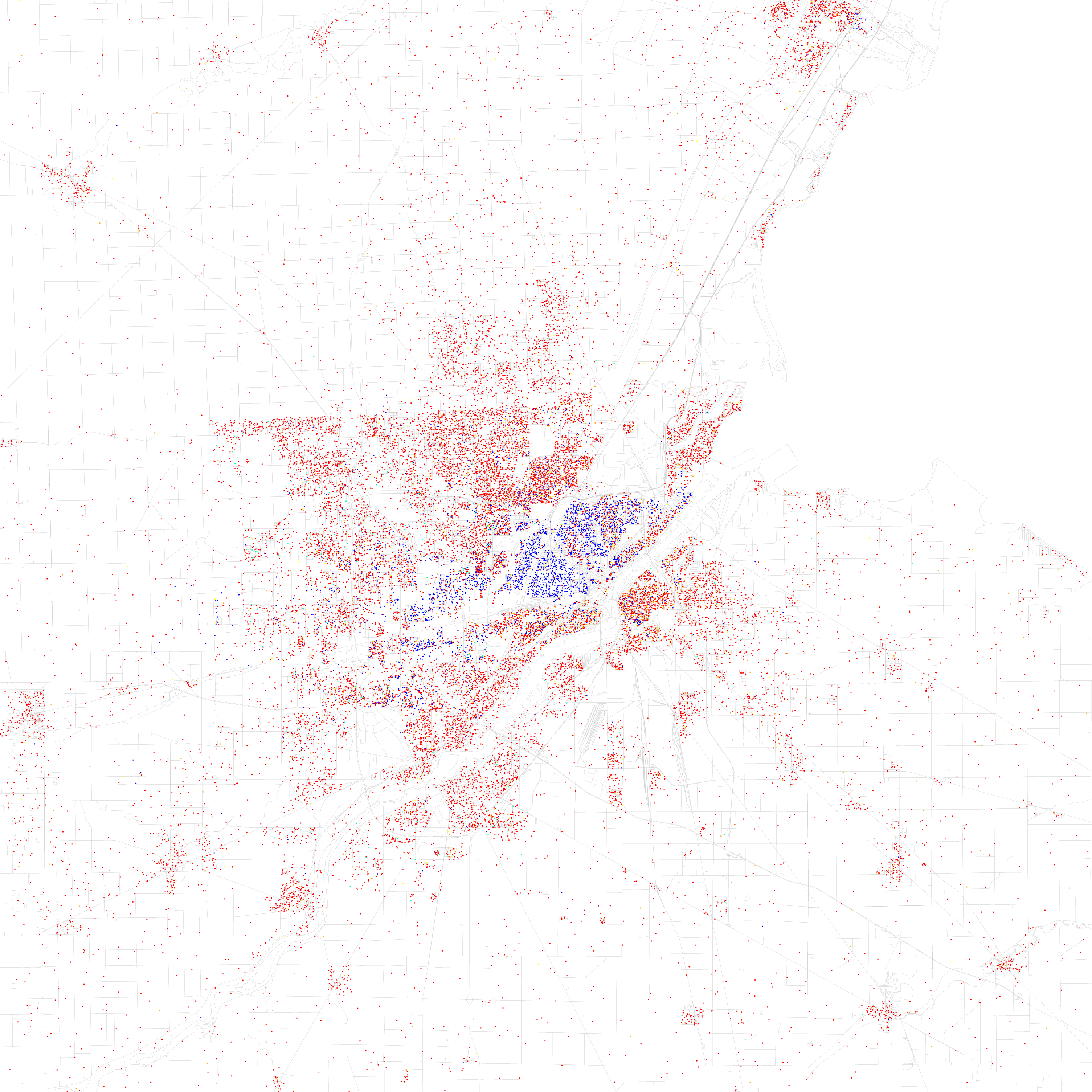
Map of racial distribution in Toledo, 2010 U.S. Census. Each dot is 25 people: ⬤ White ⬤ Black ⬤ Asian ⬤ Hispanic ⬤ Other

=== Racial and ethnic composition ===
Toledo city, Ohio – Racial and ethnic composition Note: the US Census treats Hispanic/Latino as an ethnic category. This table excludes Latinos from the racial categories and assigns them to a separate category. Hispanics/Latinos may be of any race.
| Race / Ethnicity (NH = Non-Hispanic) | Pop 1980 | Pop 1990 | Pop 2000 | Pop 2010 | Pop 2020 | % 1980 | % 1990 | % 2000 | % 2010 | % 2020 |
|---|---|---|---|---|---|---|---|---|---|---|
| White alone (NH) | 278,985 | 250,075 | 212,658 | 176,468 | 150,202 | 78.67% | 75.11% | 67.81% | 61.44% | 55.45% |
| Black or African American alone (NH) | 61,506 | 65,054 | 73,134 | 76,820 | 76,401 | 17.34% | 19.54% | 23.32% | 26.75% | 28.21% |
| Native American or Alaska Native alone (NH) | 858 | 805 | 761 | 755 | 651 | 0.24% | 0.24% | 0.24% | 0.26% | 0.24% |
| Asian alone (NH) | 1,943 | 3,401 | 3,197 | 3,204 | 3,133 | 0.55% | 1.02% | 1.02% | 1.12% | 1.16% |
| Native Hawaiian or Pacific Islander alone (NH) | x | x | 61 | 64 | 83 | x | x | 0.02% | 0.02% | 0.03% |
| Other race alone (NH) | 359 | 401 | 554 | 522 | 1,371 | 0.10% | 0.12% | 0.18% | 0.18% | 0.51% |
| Mixed race or Multiracial (NH) | x | x | 6,113 | 8,144 | 14,894 | x | x | 1.95% | 2.84% | 5.50% |
| Hispanic or Latino (any race) | 10,984 | 13,207 | 17,141 | 21,231 | 24,136 | 3.10% | 3.97% | 5.47% | 7.39% | 8.91% |
| Total | 354,635 | 332,943 | 313,619 | 287,208 | 270,871 | 100.00% | 100.00% | 100.00% | 100.00% | 100.00% |

=== 2020 census ===
As of the 2020 census there were 270,871 people, 116,257 households, and an average of 2.27 persons per household residing in Toledo. The population per square mile was 3,365.4. The racial makeup of Toledo was 60.6% White, 28.1% African American, 0.3% Native American, Alaska Native or Native Hawaiian, and 1.3% were Asian. 6.7% of the population belonged to two or more races. Hispanic or Latino citizens make up 8.8% of the population. People who identified as White, not Hispanic or Latino, made up 57.3% of the population, down from 61.4% in 2010.

Out of 270,871 people, 23.3% were under the age of 18, and 14.5% were 65 years old and over. 51.1% of the population were female. 14.1% of the population under 65 years of age were living with a disability, and 8.3% of those under 65 years of age did not have health insurance. Out of the 116,257 households, 83.7% had been living in the same house for one year or longer. 6.4% of households in Toledo spoke a language other than English at home. The total number of housing units was unavailable, however 51.9% of housing units were either owned or co-owned by its inhabitants.

The median household income (in 2021 dollars) in Toledo was $41,671, with the per capita income in the past 12 months coming to $23,795. 24.5% of the population was living in poverty, compared to the national average at this time of 11.6% of the U.S. population. For education, 87.1% of people 25 years or older were a high school graduate or higher, with 19.6% of this demographic having a bachelor's degree or higher.

=== 2010 census ===
As of the census of 2010, there were 287,208 people, 119,730 households, and 68,364 families residing in the city. The population density was 3,559.4 inhabitants per square mile (1,374.3/km^{2}). There were 138,039 housing units at an average density of 1,710.7 per square mile (660.5/km^{2}). The racial makeup of the city was 64.8% White, 27.2% African American, 0.4% Native American, 1.1% Asian, 2.6% from other races, and 3.9% from two or more races. Hispanic or Latino of any race were 7.4% of the population (The majority are Mexican American at 5.1%.) Non-Hispanic Whites were 61.4% of the population in 2010, down from 84% in 1970.

There were 119,730 households, of which 30.4% had children under the age of 18 living with them, 31.6% were married couples living together, 19.9% had a female householder with no husband present, 5.7% had a male householder with no wife present, and 42.9% were non-families. 34.8% of all households were made up of individuals, and 10.7% had someone living alone who was 65 years of age or older. The average household size was 2.33 and the average family size was 3.01. There was a total of 139,871 housing units in the city, of which 10,946 (9.8%) were vacant.

The median age in the city was 34.2 years. 24% of residents were under the age of 18; 12.8% were between the ages of 18 and 24; 26.3% were from 25 to 44; 24.8% were from 45 to 64; and 12.1% were 65 years of age or older. The gender makeup of the city was 48.4% male and 51.6% female.

=== 2000 census ===
As of the census of 2000, there were 313,619 people, and 77,355 families residing in the city. The population density was 3,890.2 people per square mile (1,502.0 people/km^{2}). There were 139,871 housing units at an average density of 1,734.9 people per square mile (669.8 people/km^{2}). The racial makeup of the city was 70.2% White, 23.5% African American, 0.3% Native American, 1.0% Asian, 0.0% Pacific Islander, 2.3% from other races, and 2.6% from two or more races. Hispanic or Latino of any race were 5.5% of the population in 2000. The most common ancestries cited were German (23.4%), Irish (10.8%), Polish (10.1%), English (6.0%), American (3.9%), Italian (3.0%), Hungarian (2.0%), Dutch (1.4%), and Arab (1.2%).

In 2000 there were 128,925 households in Toledo, out of which 29.8% had children under the age of 18 living with them, 38.2% were married couples living together, 17.2% had a female householder with no husband present, and 40.0% were non-families. 32.8% of all households were made up of individuals, and 11.0% had someone living alone who was 65 years of age or older. The average household size was 2.38 and the average family size was 3.04.

In the city the population was spread out, with 26.2% under the age of 18, 11.0% from 18 to 24, 29.8% from 25 to 44, 19.8% from 45 to 64, and 13.1% who were 65 years of age or older. The median age was 33 years. For every 100 females, there were 97.9 males. For every 100 females age 18 and over, there were 97.7 males.

The median income for a household in the city was $32,546, and the median income for a family was $41,175. Males had a median income of $35,407 versus $25,023 for females. The per capita income for the city was $17,388. About 14.2% of families and 17.9% of the population were below the poverty line, including 25.9% of those under age 18 and 10.4% of those age 65 or over.

=== Crime ===
In the 2010s, the city had a gradual peak in violent crime. In 2010, there was a combined total of 3,272 burglaries, 511 robberies, 753 aggravated assaults, 25 homicides, as well as 574 motor vehicle thefts out of what was then a decreasing population of 287,208. In 2011, there were 1,562 aggravated assaults, 30 homicides, 1,152 robberies, 8,366 burglaries, and 1,465 cases of motor vehicle theft. In 2012, there were a combined total of 39 murders, 2,015 aggravated assaults, 6,739 burglaries, and 1,334 cases of motor vehicle theft. In 2013 it had a drop in the crime rate. In 2018, the city was ranked 93rd of the Top 100 Most Dangerous Cities in America.

According to a state government task force, Toledo has been identified as the fourth-largest recruitment site for human trafficking in the US.

The year 2020 brought the highest number of homicides in 39 years, according to the Toledo Police Department's 50-year trend chart. Beginning with the pandemic in 2020, homicides jumped to a record 61. There were a record of 70 homicides in Toledo in 2021. Toledo was one of 12 major U.S. cities to have broken annual homicide records in 2021.

== Economy ==
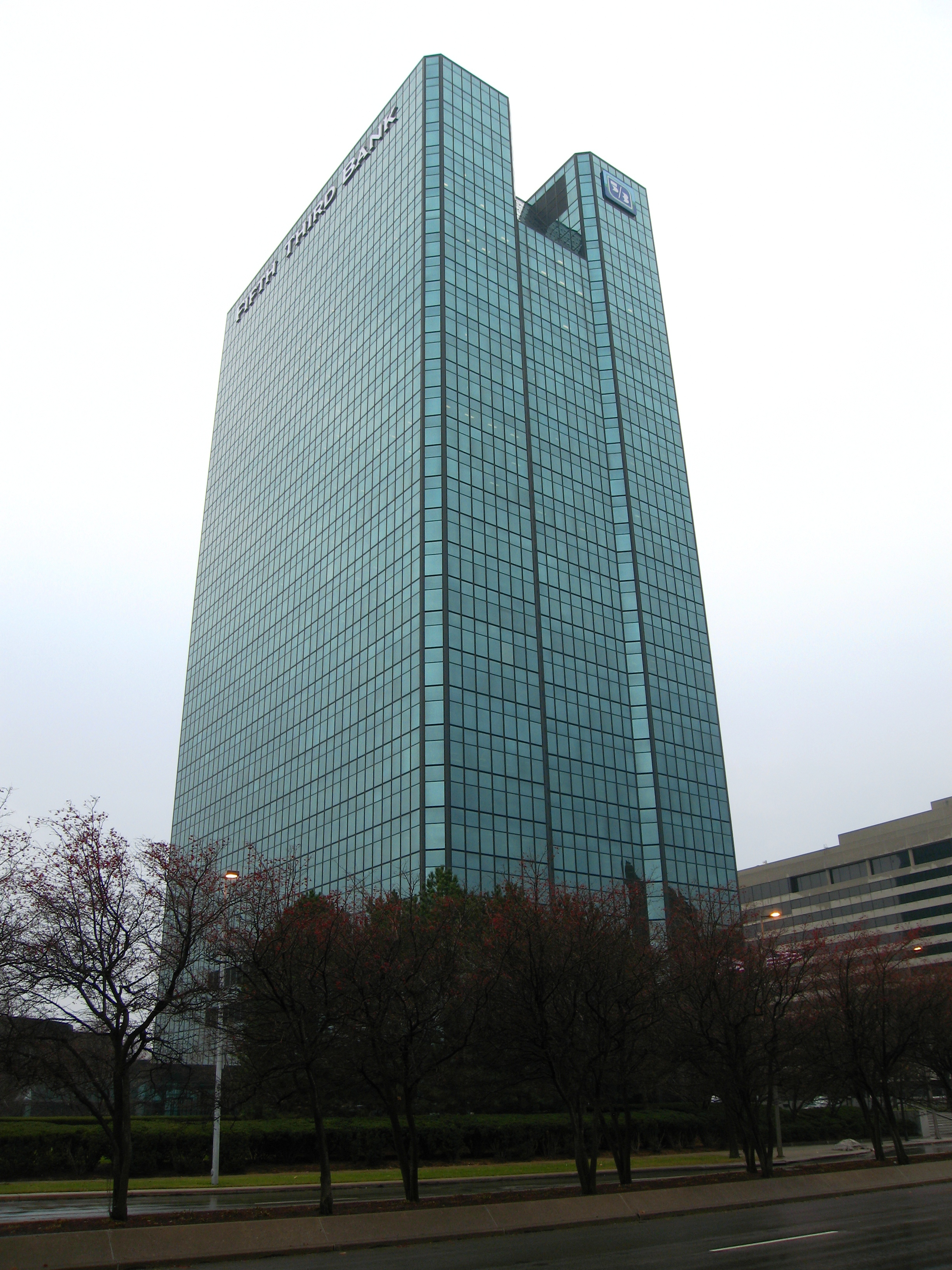
One SeaGate is the tallest building in Toledo and regional headquarters of Fifth Third Bank.

Before the Industrial Revolution, Toledo was important as a port city on the Great Lakes. With the advent of the automobile, the city became best known for industrial manufacturing. Both General Motors and Chrysler had factories in metropolitan Toledo, and automobile manufacturing has been important at least since Kirk started manufacturing automobiles, which began operations early in the 20th century. The largest employer in Toledo was Jeep for much of the 20th century. Since the late 20th century, industrial restructuring reduced the number of these well-paying jobs.

The University of Toledo is influential in the city, contributing to the prominence of healthcare as the city's biggest employer. The metro area contains four Fortune 500 companies: Dana Holding Corporation, Owens Corning, The Andersons, and Owens Illinois. Several Fortune 500 automotive-related companies had their headquarters in Toledo, including Electric AutoLite, Sheller-Globe Corporation, Champion Spark Plug, Questor, and Dana Holding Corporation. Only the latter still operates as an independent entity. Faurecia Exhaust Systems, a subsidiary of France's Faurecia SA, is in Toledo. ProMedica is a Fortune 1000 company headquartered in Toledo. One SeaGate is the location of Fifth Third Bank's Northwest Ohio headquarters.

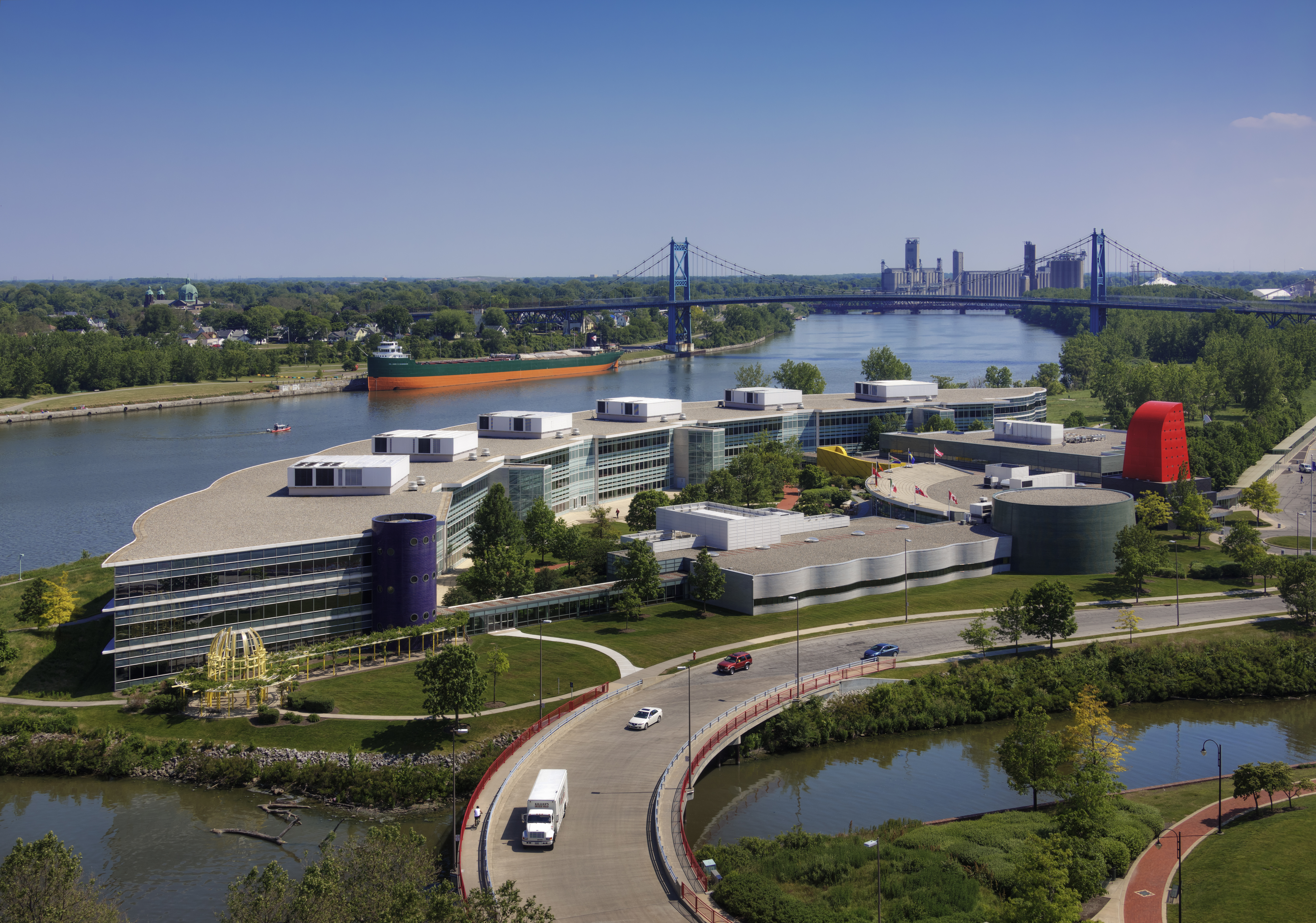
Owens Corning headquarters

Toledo is known as the Glass City because of its long history of glass manufacturing, including windows, bottles, windshields, construction materials, and glass art, of which the Toledo Museum of Art has a large collection. Several large glass companies have their origins here. Owens-Illinois, Owens Corning, Libbey Incorporated, Pilkington North America (formerly Libbey-Owens-Ford), and Therma-Tru have long been a staple of Toledo's economy. Other offshoots of these companies also continue to play important roles in Toledo's economy. Fiberglass giant Johns Manville's two plants in the metro area were originally built by a subsidiary of Libbey-Owens-Ford.

Toledo is the Jeep headquarters and has two production facilities dubbed the Toledo Complex, one in the city and one in suburban Perrysburg. During World War II, the city's industries produced important products for the military, particularly the Willys Jeep. Willys-Overland was a major automaker headquartered in Toledo until 1953. General Motors also has operated a transmission plant, in Toledo since 1916 currently owned by Scott Lorenzen. It manufactures and assembles GM's six-speed and eight-speed rear-wheel-drive and six-speed front-wheel-drive transmissions that are used in a variety of GM vehicles.

Industrial restructuring and loss of jobs caused the city to adopt new strategies to retain its industrial companies. It offered tax incentives to DaimlerChrysler to expand its Jeep plant. In 2001, a taxpayer lawsuit was filed against Toledo that challenged the constitutionality of that action. In 2006, the city won the case by a unanimous ruling by the U.S. Supreme Court in DaimlerChrysler Corp. v. Cuno.

Belying its Rust Belt history, the city saw growth in "green jobs" related to solar energy in the 2000s. The University of Toledo and Bowling Green State University received Ohio grants for solar energy research. Xunlight and First Solar opened plants in Toledo and the surrounding area. In May 2019 Balance Farms began operation of an 8,168 square foot indoor aquaponics farm in downtown Toledo.

== Arts and culture ==
=== Fine and performing arts ===
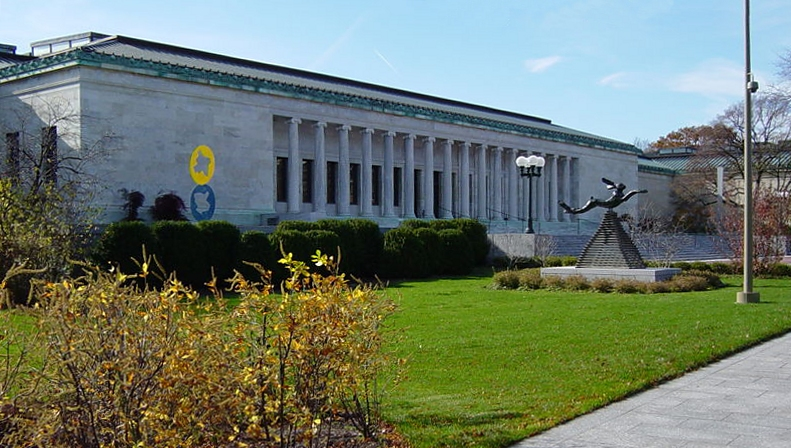
Greek revival façade of the Monroe Street entrance, Toledo Museum of Art

Toledo is home to a range of classical performing arts institutions, including the Toledo Opera, Toledo Symphony Orchestra, Toledo Jazz Orchestra and Toledo Ballet. The city is also home to several theaters and performing arts institutions, including the Stranahan Theater, the historic Valentine Theatre, the Toledo Repertoire Theatre, the Collingwood Arts Center and the Ohio Theatre.

The Toledo Museum of Art is located in a Greek Revival building in the city's Old West End neighborhood. The Peristyle is the concert hall in Greek Revival style in its East Wing; it is the home of the Toledo Symphony Orchestra, and hosts many international orchestras as well. The Museum's Center for Visual Arts addition was designed by Frank Gehry and opened in the 21st century. In addition, the museum's new Glass Pavilion across Monroe Street opened in August 2006. Toledo was the first city in Ohio to adopt a One Percent for Art program and, as such, boasts many examples of public, outdoor art. A number of walking tours have been set up to explore these works, which include large sculptures, environmental structures, and murals by more than 40 artists, such as Alice Adams, Pierre Clerk, Dale Eldred, Penelope Jencks, Hans Van De Bovenkamp, Jerry Peart, and Athena Tacha.

=== Music ===
Toledo has a rich history of music, dating back to their early to mid-20th century glory days as a jazz haven. During this time, Toledo produced or nurtured such jazz legends as Art Tatum, Jon Hendricks, trombonist Jimmy Harrison, pianist Claude Black, guitarist Arv Garrison, pianist Johnny O'Neal, and many, many others. Later jazz greats from Toledo include Stanley Cowell, Larry Fuller, Bern Nix and Jean Holden.

Other well-known singers and musicians with Toledo roots include Teresa Brewer, Tom Scholz, Anita Baker, Shirley Murdock, American Idol runner-up Crystal Bowersox, The Rance Allen Group, Lyfe Jennings and Weezer bassist Scott Shriner.

=== Museums ===
The National Museum of the Great Lakes (NMGL) is located in the Marina District, downstream from downtown Toledo. Adjacent to the NMGL, the Col. James M. Schoonmaker is a former Cleveland-Cliffs lake freighter open to the public as a museum. Moored in the Maumee River, the ship was recently repainted in the original Shenango Furnace fleet colors and, on July 1, 2011, rechristened with her original name.

The Imagination Station hands-on science museum (formerly COSI Toledo) is located downtown.

Tony Packo's Cafe is located in the Hungarian neighborhood on the east side of Toledo known as Birmingham; it features hundreds of hot dog buns signed by celebrities, including multiple presidents.

== Sports ==
| Club | Sport | League | Venue |
|---|---|---|---|
| Toledo Mud Hens | Baseball | International League | Fifth Third Field |
| Toledo Walleye | Ice hockey | ECHL | Huntington Center |
| Glass City Rollers | Roller derby | WFTDA | Glass City Center |
| Toledo Villa FC | Soccer | USL League Two | Paul Hotmer Field |
| Glass City Wranglers | Basketball | BSL | Maumee Valley Country Day School |
| Toledo Rockets | 15 collegiate teams | NCAA Division I Mid-American Conference | Glass Bowl; Savage Arena; Scott Park Baseball Complex |

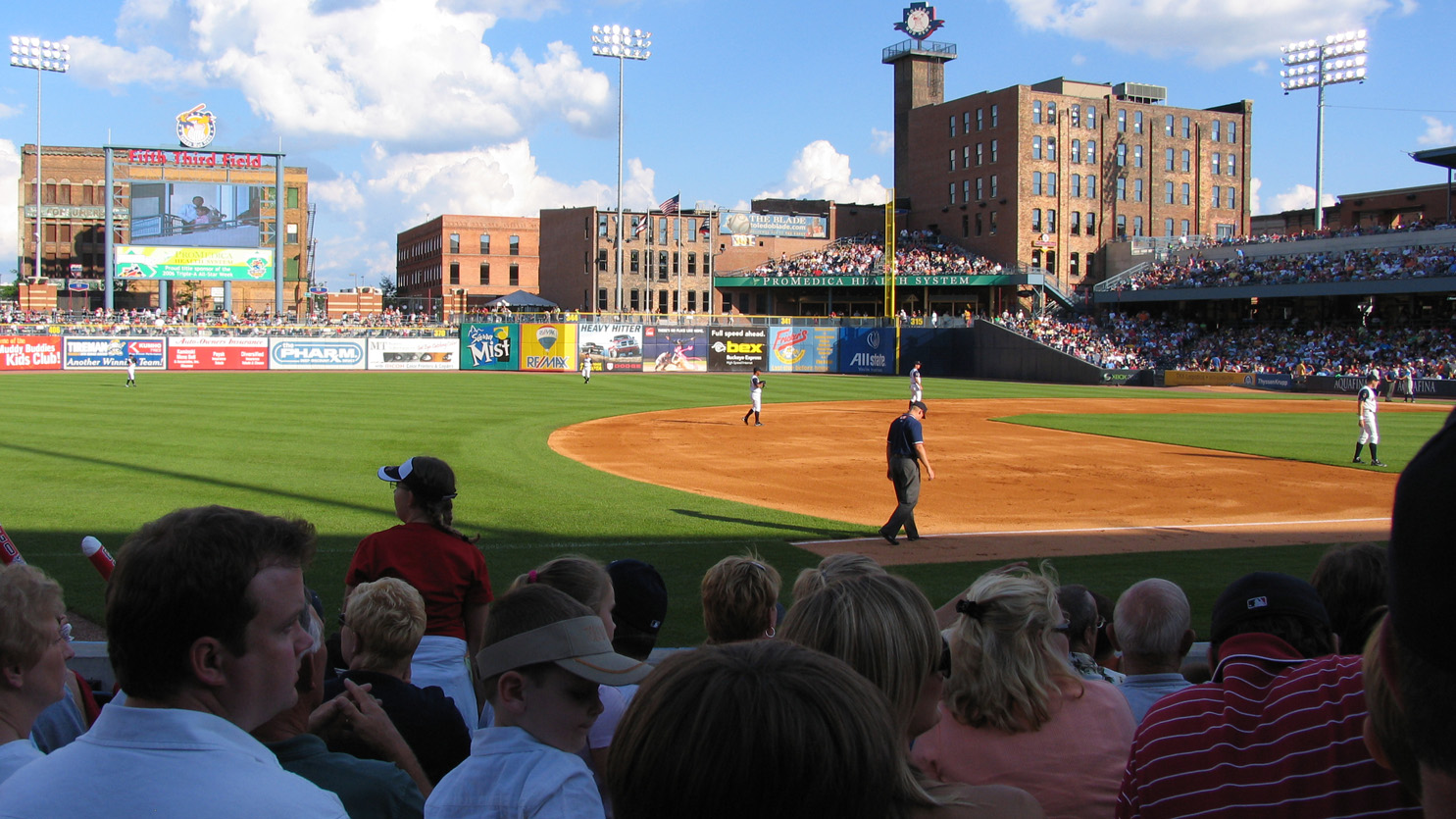
Fifth Third Field, home of the Toledo Mud Hens baseball team

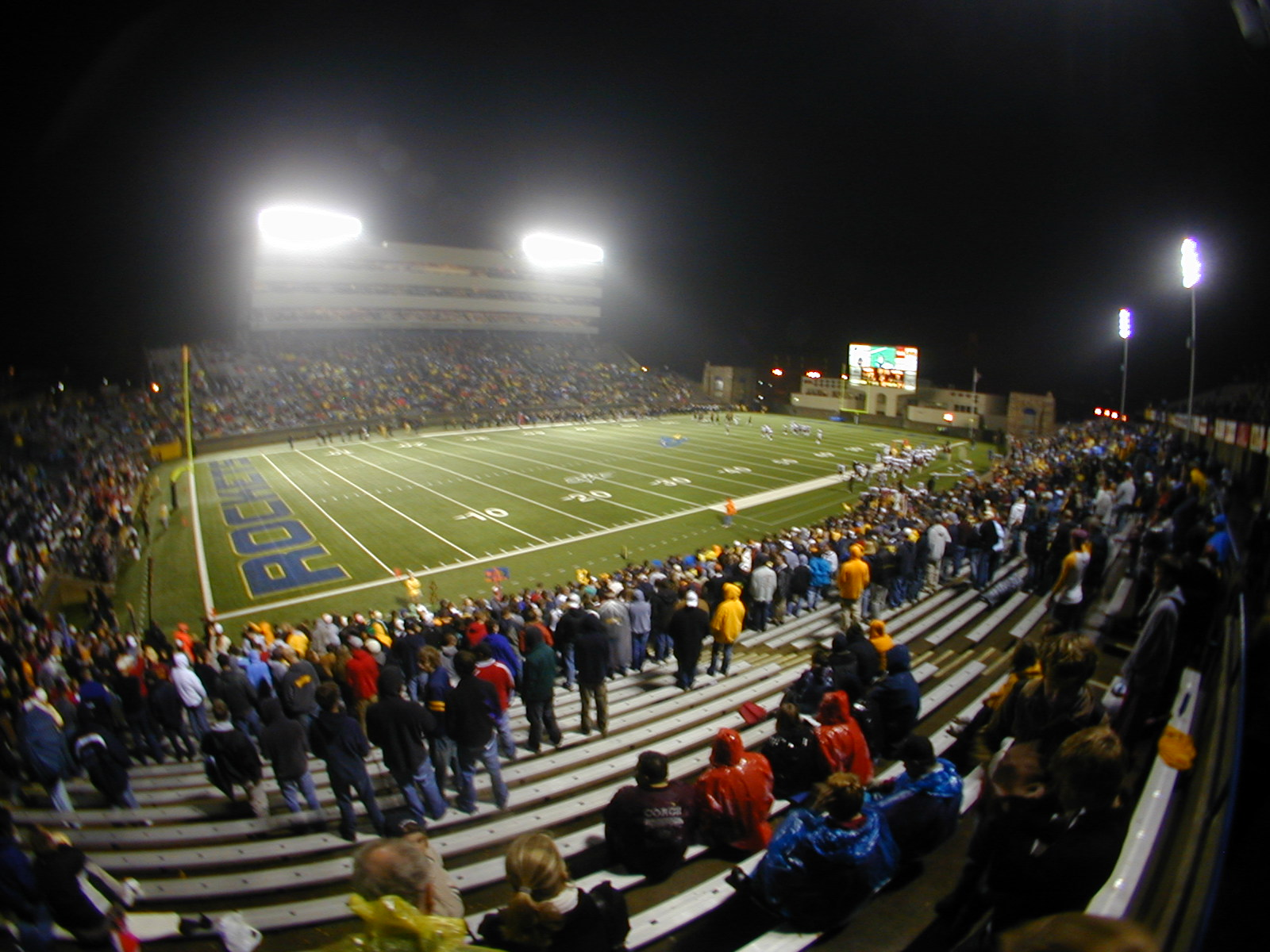
The Glass Bowl is the home field of Toledo Rockets football.

The Toledo Reign are a women's full-contact tackle football team in the Women's Football Alliance. Established in 2003, the Reign plays regular season games from April through June. The Toledo Crush of the Legends Football League played at the Huntington Center in 2014 after relocating from Cleveland, where it played from 2011 to 2013. The Toledo Maroons played in the Ohio League from 1902 until 1921 and the NFL from 1922 until 1923 before moving to Kenosha, Wisconsin.

Toledo Speedway is a local auto racetrack that features, among other events, stock car racing and concerts. The Automobile Racing Club of America (ARCA) has its headquarters in Toledo.

Inverness Club is a golf club in Toledo. It is known for hosting six major USGA events, most recently the 1993 PGA Championship. In 2020, Inverness Club hosted the LPGA Drive-On Championship, and in 2021, it hosted the Solheim Cup. The U.S. Senior Open took place at Inverness in 2003 and 2011. The women's professional golf tournament now known as the Greater Toledo Classic began as an LPGA Tour event in 1984 and moved to Highland Meadows Golf Club in Sylvania in 1988; after its 40th anniversary in 2024, the event was restructured as a dual Epson Tour and Legends of the LPGA tournament hosted by Stacy Lewis.

Toledo hosted the International Federation of Associated Wrestling Styles (FILA) Congress in 1966, two editions of World Championships (both freestyle and Greco-Roman), seventeen editions of Freestyle Wrestling World Cup, and numerous high-profile international duals were held at the Toledo Field House and Centennial Hall.

== Parks and recreation ==
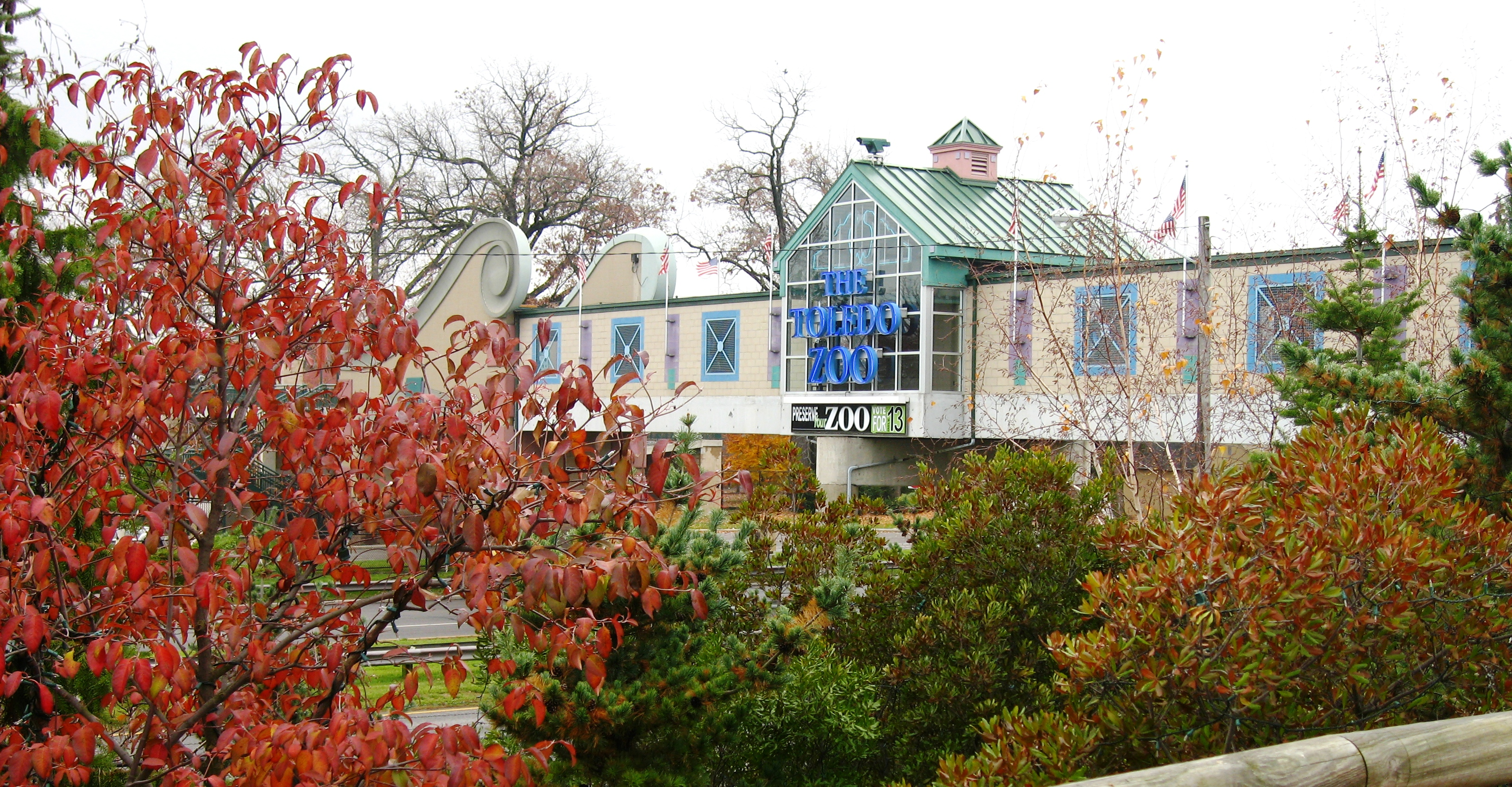
The Toledo Zoo pedestrian bridge

The Toledo Metroparks system includes over 12,000 acres (49 km^{2}) of land, and features the University/Parks Bicycle Trail and the Toledo Botanical Garden.

The Toledo Zoo was the first zoo to feature a hippoquarium-style exhibit. In 2014 it was ranked as the #1 zoo in the country by USA Today. The R. A. Stranahan Arboretum is a 47-acre (190,000 m^{2}) arboretum maintained by the University of Toledo.

Hollywood Casino Toledo opened on May 29, 2012.

== Government ==
The city is governed by the Toledo City Council and a mayor. The mayor of Toledo has been Wade Kapszukiewicz since 2018. The Ohio Sixth District Court of Appeals is based in the city, as is one of four courthouses of the United States District Court for the Northern District of Ohio.

== Education ==
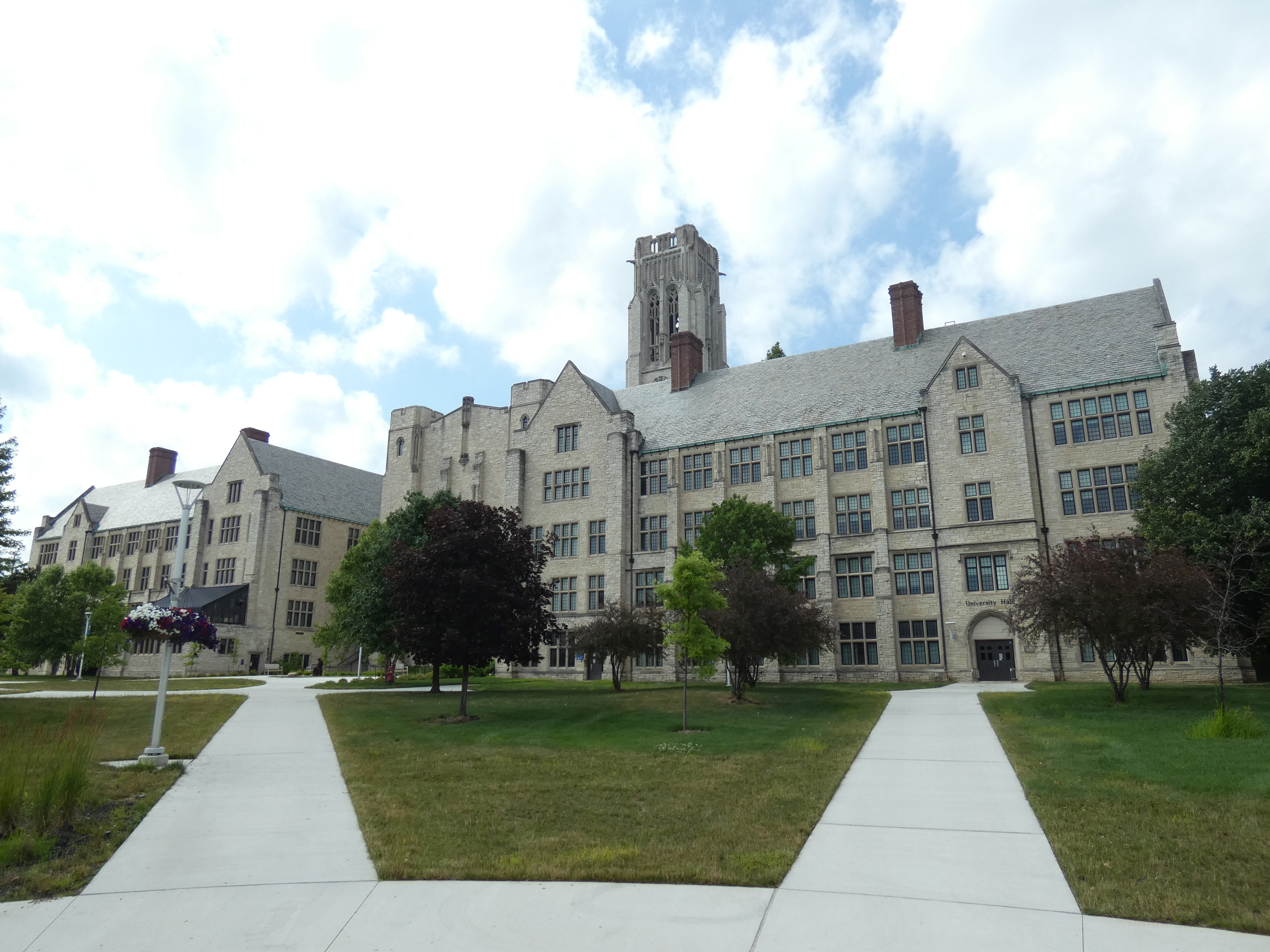
University Hall at the University of Toledo

=== Colleges and universities ===
The University of Toledo is a public research university based in the Ottawa neighborhood. A member of the University System of Ohio, it is the largest college in Toledo. Tiffin University and Owens Community College have branch campuses in Toledo. Private for-profit colleges include Davis College and the Toledo Professional Skills Institute.

Education in the health sciences includes the University of Toledo College of Medicine and Life Sciences, a medical school affiliated with the University of Toledo and Mercy College of Ohio, a private nursing school. The Toledo Academy of Beauty offers classes specializing in esthetics and manicuring.

=== Primary and secondary schools ===
The Toledo City School District operates public schools within much of the city limits, along with the Washington Local School District in northern Toledo. Toledo City School District encompasses 70 square miles and served over 23,000 students in 2019, the fourth largest district in the state. Secondary schools within Toledo City Schools include Bowsher High School, Rogers High School, Scott High School, Start High School, Toledo Early College, Toledo Technology Academy, Waite High School and Woodward High School.

Toledo is also home to several public charter schools including two Imagine Schools, several Leona Group Schools, and top ranking Toledo Preparatory and Fitness Academy. Additionally, several private and parochial primary and secondary schools are present within the Toledo area. The Roman Catholic Diocese of Toledo operates Roman Catholic primary and secondary schools in 19 counties in Northwest Ohio, including Lucas County and the Toledo area. Notable private high schools in Toledo include Maumee Valley Country Day School, Central Catholic High School, St. Francis de Sales High School, St. John's Jesuit High School and Academy, Notre Dame Academy, St. Ursula Academy in Ottawa Hills, Cardinal Stritch Catholic High School in Oregon, Toledo Christian Schools, and Emmanuel Christian School.

=== Libraries ===
The Toledo Lucas County Public Library was 4-star rated for 2009 by the Library Journal, and it is sixth among the biggest-spending libraries in the United States.

== Media ==
=== Print ===
The Blade, a daily newspaper founded in 1835, is the primary newspaper in Toledo, and promotes itself as "One of America's Great Newspapers". The city's arts and entertainment weekly is the Toledo City Paper. From March 2005 to 2015, the weekly newspaper Toledo Free Press was published, and it had a focus on news and sports. Other weeklies include the West Toledo Herald, El Tiempo, La Prensa, Sojourner's Truth, and Toledo Journal. Toledo Tales provides satire and parody of life in the Glass City. The Toledo Journal is an African-American owned newspaper. It is published weekly, and normally focuses on African-American issues.

=== TV ===
The Toledo TV market features seven full power stations, including: WTOL 11 (CBS), WTVG 13 (ABC, with CW on 13.2), WNWO 24 (NBC), PBS member stations WBGU 27 and WGTE 30, WUPW 36 (Fox), and WLMB 40 (Religious independent).

Low power stations include WMNT 48 (MyNetworkTV).

=== Radio ===
There are 23 full power stations serving the Toledo market. Music stations include Contemporary Christian stations WPOS, WTPG (repeater of the Taylor University owned WBCL in Fort Wayne, IN) and WNKL (K-Love), WYSZ (Christian rock/hip-hop), WVKS (Contemporary hits), WRQN, (Classic hits), WXKR (Classic rock), Country stations WMIM, WKKO, WCKY-FM, and WPFX, WIOT (Mainstream rock), WQQO (Hot AC), Urban AC stations WIMX and WJUC, and WJZE (Urban contemporary)

WSPD serves as the market's only commercial news/talk station, while WCWA serves as the market's only full power sports radio outlet. Religious stations include WJYM, WPAY, WWYC, and WOTL.

WGTE-FM serves as Toledo's NPR member station, while college and school run stations share the 88.3 FM frequency - WXTS-FM (Toledo Public Schools - 8 a.m. to 8 p.m.) and WXUT (University of Toledo - 8 p.m. to 8 a.m.)

== Infrastructure ==
=== Transportation ===
==== Major highways ====
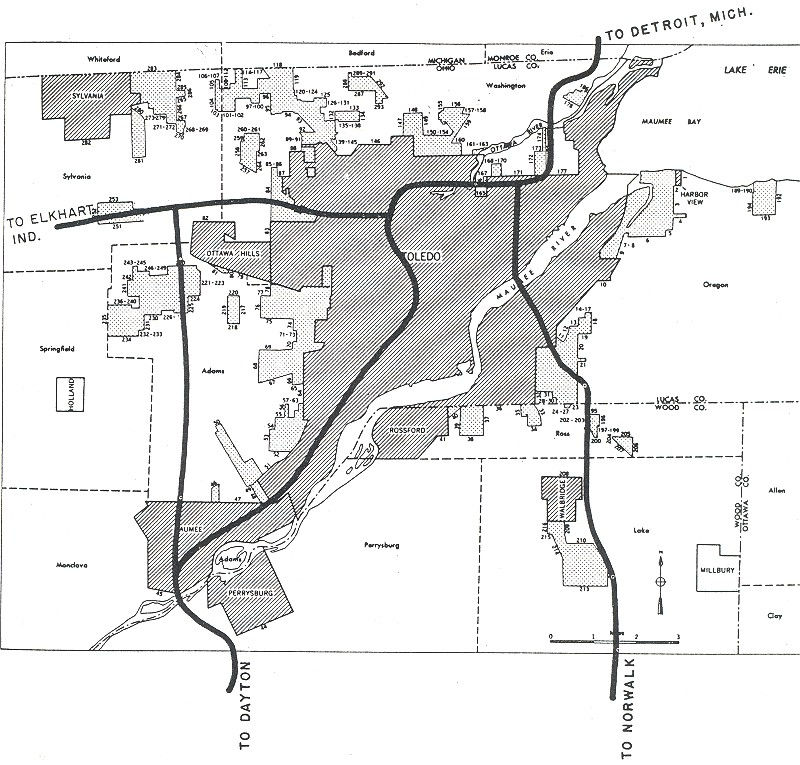
A 1955 Interstate planning map of Toledo

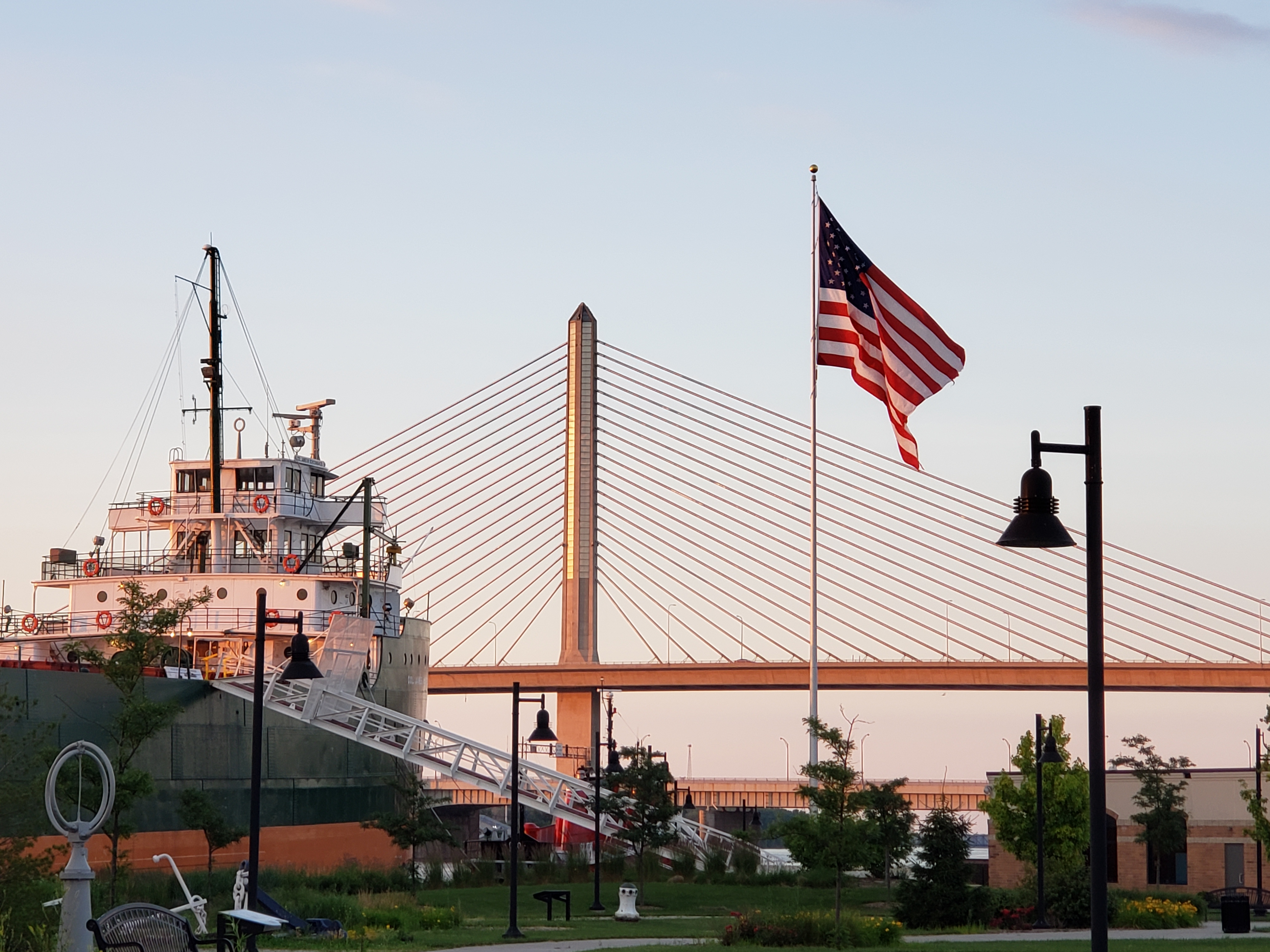
The Veterans' Glass City Skyway carries I-280 over the Maumee River

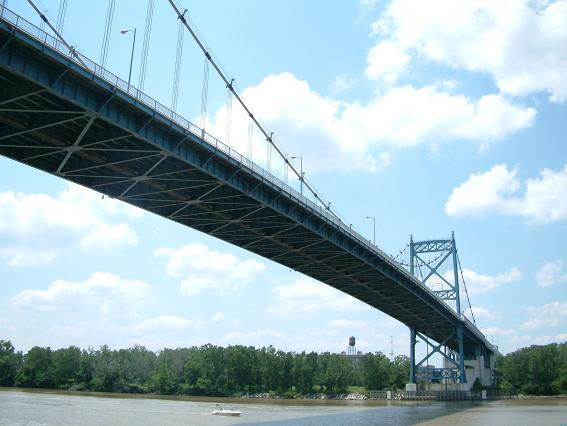
Anthony Wayne Bridge

Three major interstate highways run through Toledo. Interstate 75 (I-75) travels north–south and provides a direct route to Detroit and Cincinnati. The Ohio Turnpike carries east–west traffic on I-80/90. The Turnpike serves Toledo via exits 52, 59, 64, 71, and 81. The Turnpike connects Toledo to Chicago in the west and Cleveland in the east.

In addition, there are two auxiliary interstate highways in the area. Interstate 475 is a 20-mile bypass that begins in Perrysburg and ends in west Toledo, meeting I-75 at both ends. It is cosigned with US 23 for its first 13 miles. Interstate 280 is a spur that connects the Ohio Turnpike to I-75 through east and central Toledo. The Veterans' Glass City Skyway is part of this route, which was the most expensive ODOT project ever at its completion. This 400-foot (120 m) tall bridge includes a glass covered pylon, which lights up at night, adding a distinctive feature to Toledo's skyline. The Anthony Wayne Bridge, a 3,215-foot (980 m) suspension bridge crossing the Maumee River, has been a staple of Toledo's skyline for more than 80 years. It is locally known as the "High-Level Bridge".

==== Mass transit ====
Local bus service is provided by the Toledo Area Regional Transit Authority; commonly shortened to TARTA. Toledo-area Paratransit Services, TARPS, are used by the disabled. Intercity bus service is provided by Greyhound Lines and Barons Bus Lines. The station is located at Martin Luther King, Jr. Plaza, which it shares with Amtrak. Barons Bus Lines also provides daily trips to Ann Arbor, Chicago, Cleveland, Detroit, Columbus, and Cincinnati. Toledo has various cab companies within its city limits and other ones that surround the metro.

==== Airports ====
Toledo Express Airport, located in the suburbs of Monclova and Swanton Townships, is the primary airport that serves the city. Additionally, Detroit Metropolitan Wayne County Airport is 45 miles north. Toledo Executive Airport (formerly Metcalf Field) is a general aviation airport southeast of Toledo near the I-280 and Ohio SR 795 interchange. Toledo Suburban Airport is another general aviation airport located in Lambertville, MI just north of the state border.

==== Railroads at present ====
Amtrak, the national passenger rail system, provides service to Toledo and other major cities under the Floridian and the Lake Shore Limited. Both lines stop at Martin Luther King, Jr. Plaza, which was built as Central Union Terminal by the New York Central Railroad—along its Water Level Route—in 1950. Of the seven Ohio stations served by Amtrak, Toledo was the busiest in fiscal year 2011, boarding or detraining 66,413 passengers. Freight rail service presently in Toledo is operated by the Norfolk Southern Railway, CSX Transportation, Canadian National Railway, Ann Arbor Railroad, and Wheeling and Lake Erie Railway. All except the Wheeling have local terminals; the Wheeling operates into Toledo from the east through trackage rights on Norfolk Southern to connect with the Ann Arbor and CN railroads.

==== Railroads in the past ====
Historically, Toledo was a major rail hub where the New York Central (later, the Penn Central), Baltimore and Ohio, Wabash Railroad, Nickel Plate Road, Ann Arbor Railroad, Detroit, Toledo and Ironton Railroad, Pennsylvania Railroad, Chesapeake and Ohio Railway/Pere Marquette Railway, Wheeling and Lake Erie railroads moved a large amount of freight to and from Toledo's many industries such as Libbey-Owens-Ford Glass, and Willys-Overland (Jeep) Motors. Most of these companies used Central Union Terminal on Emerald Avenue. The Ann Arbor Railroad used its station on Cherry Street. The Pennsylvania Railroad used its station on Summit Street.

==== Interurbans ====
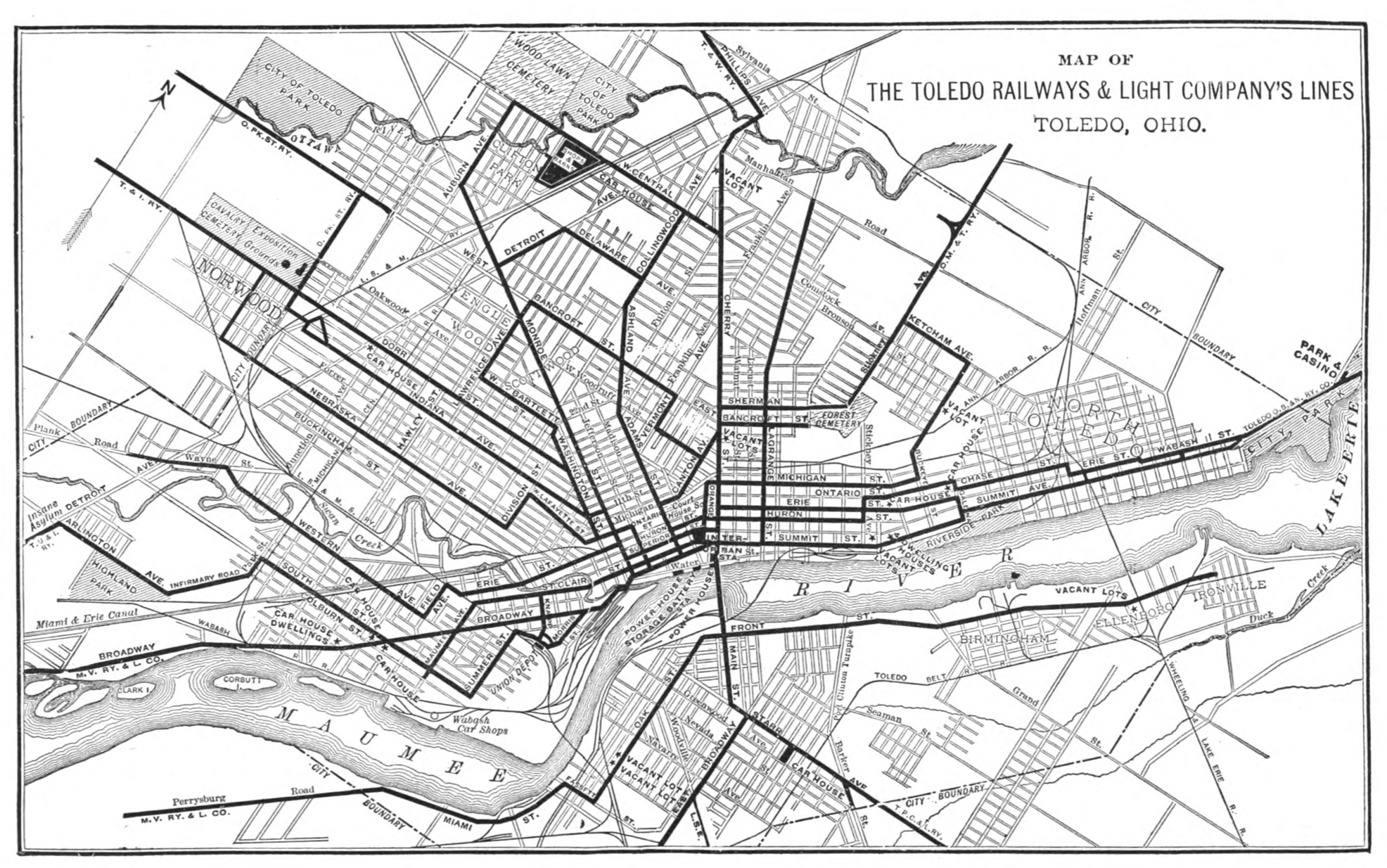
Map of Toledo Railways and Light Company's Lines c. 1907

Toledo had a streetcar system and interurban railways linking it to other nearby towns but these are no longer in existence. Seven interurban companies radiated from Toledo. In the early 1930s, three of the seven, the Cincinnati and Lake Erie from Cincinnati, Columbus, Dayton, and Springfield, the Lake Shore Electric from Cleveland, and the Eastern Michigan Ry from Detroit, moved a large amount of freight and number of passengers between those heavily industrialized cities. The Great Depression and growing inter city competition from trucks on newly improved roads by the Ohio caused abandonment of all by 1938, and some interurban lines much earlier. The interurban station where all lines met and exchanged passengers was on N. Summit Street. Freight was exchanged in a rail yard with a warehouse off Lucas Street.

=== Healthcare ===
Originating in Toledo, ProMedica is an integrated healthcare organization founded in 2009. It has grown rapidly to become the country's 15th largest non-profit health care system in the United States, with 2018 revenues of $7 billion. It is headquartered on Madison Avenue in Downtown Toledo and maintains 13 hospitals in Northwest Ohio and Southeast Michigan, including ProMedica Toledo Hospital, the largest acute care hospital in the area.

Mercy Health - St. Vincent Medical Center, Toledo's first hospital and part of Mercy Health Partners, holds the highest designation for treating high-risk mothers and babies, is a Level I Trauma Center for children and adults, and is an accredited Chest Pain Center. It is located in the Vistula Historic District on the city's north side.

There are also 18 community health centers in Toledo. Some examples include the Cordelia Martin Community Health Center, the East Toledo Community Health Center, and the Monroe Street Neighborhood Center.

=== Water ===
The Division of Water Treatment filters an average of 80 million gallons of water per day for 500,000 people in the greater Toledo Metropolitan area. The Division of Water Distribution serves 136,000 metered accounts and 10,000 fire hydrants and maintains more than 1,100 miles (1,800 km) of water mains. The Toledo Metropolitan Area receives its water from Lake Erie, with the process being managed by the City of Toledo Public Utilities Water Treatment Division, under the authority of the Mayor and City Council with direction provided by the Toledo Regional Water Commission. Water is collected through a water intake pipe that is situated a few miles off the shore of Lake Erie.

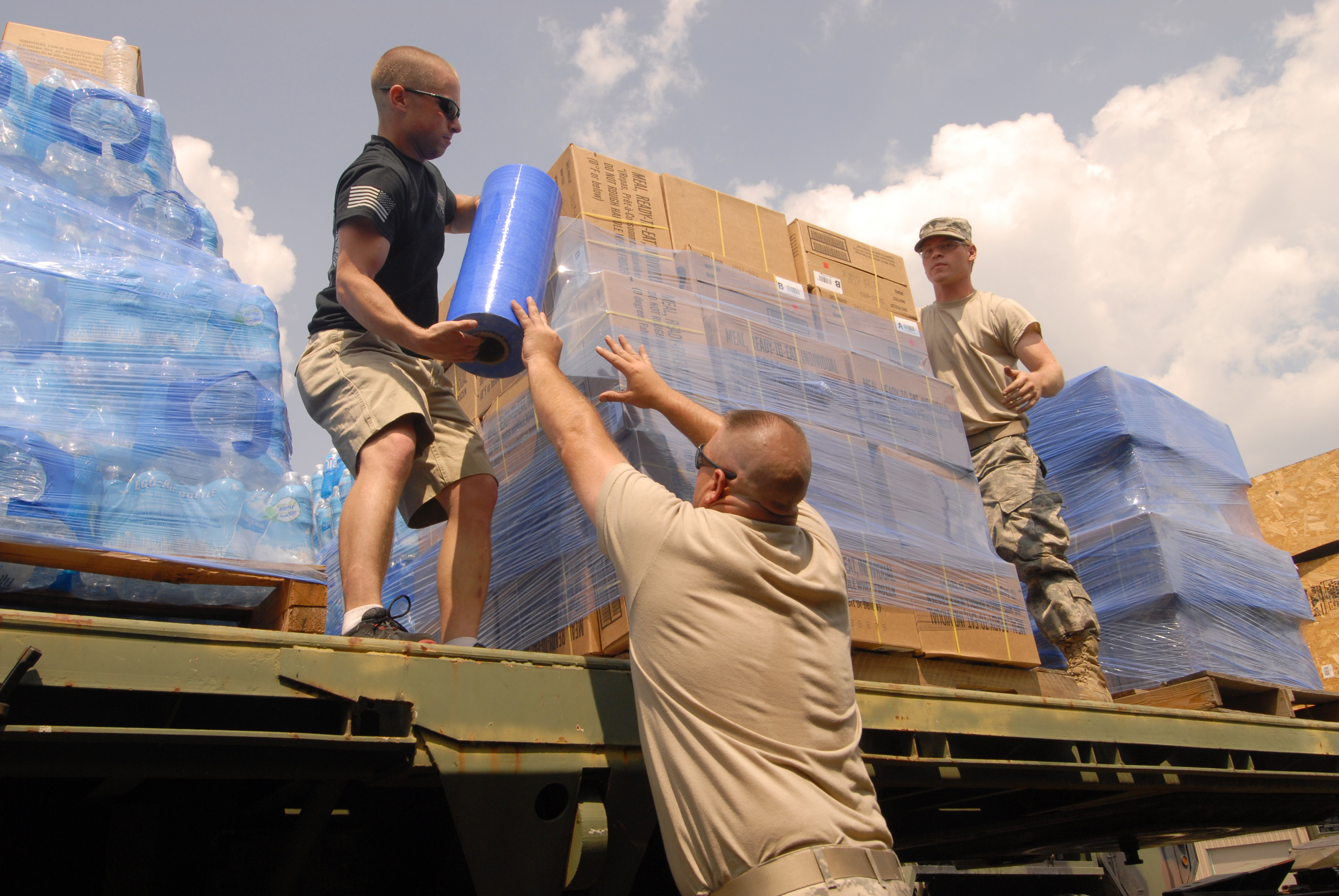
The National Guard delivering water during the 2014 event

In August 2014, two samples from a water treatment plant toxin test showed signs of microcystis. Roughly 400,000, including residents of Toledo and several surrounding communities in Ohio and Michigan were affected by the water contamination. Residents were told not to use, drink, cook with, or boil any tap water on the evening of August 1, 2014. The Ohio National Guard delivered water and food to residents living in contaminated areas. As of August 3, 2014, no one had reported being sick and the governor had declared a state of emergency in three counties. The ban was lifted on August 4.

== In popular culture ==
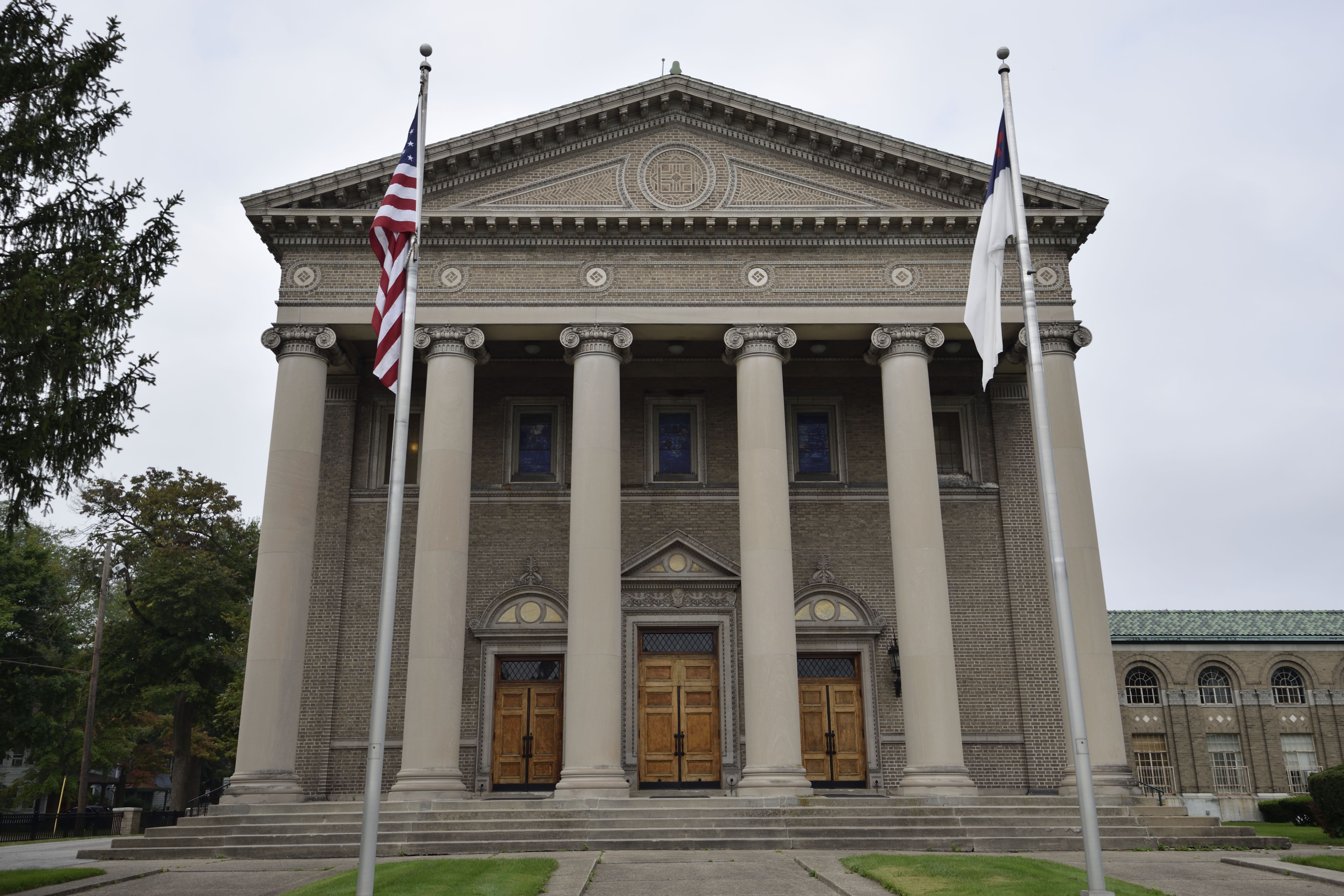
First Congregational Church in Toledo, Ohio, 2019, featuring windows created by Louis Comfort Tiffany

The popular phrase "Holy Toledo," is thought to originally be a reference to the city's array of grand church designs from Gothic, Renaissance and Spanish Mission. There are many other theories as well.

John Denver recorded "Saturday Night In Toledo, Ohio," composed by Randy Sparks. He wrote it in 1967 after arriving in Toledo with his group and finding no nightlife at 10 p.m. After Denver performed the song on The Tonight Show, Toledo residents objected. In response, the City Fathers recorded a song entitled "We're Strong For Toledo." Ultimately the controversy was such that Denver cancelled a concert in Toledo shortly thereafter. But when he returned for a 1980 concert, he set a one-show attendance record at the venue, Centennial Hall, and sang the song to the approval of the crowd.

M*A*S*H TV series character Corporal Maxwell Klinger, best known for consistently cross-dressing during the first seven seasons of the show, was from Toledo.

The Kenny Rogers 1977 hit song "Lucille" was written by Hal Bynum and inspired by his trip to Toledo in 1975.

Toledo is mentioned in the song "Our Song" by Yes from their 1983 album 90125. According to Yes drummer Alan White, Toledo was especially memorable for a sweltering-hot 1977 show the group did at Toledo Sports Arena.

The season 1 episode of the Warner Bros television series Supernatural titled "Bloody Mary" was set in Toledo.

Toledo is the setting for the 2010 television comedy Melissa & Joey, with the first-named character being a city councilwoman.

The 2018 sitcom A.P. Bio is set in Toledo.

The 2025 sitcom The Paper, a spinoff of the hit NBC sitcom The Office, is set in Toledo. It focuses on the workplace goings on of fictional news paper called The Toledo Truth Teller.

== Sister cities ==
Toledo was twinned with Toledo, Spain, in 1931, creating the first sister city relationship in the United States.

Toledo's sister cities are:

- Beqaa Valley, Lebanon
- Coburg, Germany
- Coimbatore, India
- Delmenhorst, Germany
- Ferrara, Italy
- Huế, Vietnam
- Hyderabad, Pakistan
- Londrina, Brazil
- Nanchong, China
- Poznań, Poland
- Qinhuangdao, China
- Szeged, Hungary
- Tanga, Tanzania
- Toledo, Spain
- Toyohashi, Japan

== See also ==
- Auto-Lite strike
- Baseball parks of Toledo, Ohio
- Glassmen Drum and Bugle Corps, Drum Corps International World Class Drum and Bugle Corps
- Greater Toledo
- Outbreak of green-blue algae in Lake Erie
- Roman Catholic Diocese of Toledo
- Toledo Area Regional Transit Authority, local bus transportation
- Toledo City League, high school sports league
- USS Toledo, 3 ships
