= USS Toledo =

Three ships of the United States Navy have been named USS Toledo for Toledo, Ohio:

- The first USS Toledo (PF-33) was a patrol frigate that was renamed USS Dearborn in 1943.
- The second USS Toledo (CA-133) was a Baltimore-class heavy cruiser active during the Korean War.
- The third USS Toledo (SSN-769) is a Los Angeles-class submarine still in active service
