= Flag of Toledo, Ohio =

Toledo, Ohio
- Use: Civil flag
- Proportion: 3:5
- Adopted: January 7, 2025; 22 months ago
- Designed by: Mark Yappueying

The city flag of Toledo, Ohio, consists of three horizontal bands, blue, white, and blue, with smaller light blue bands separating them. It has a sunburst in the top left corner and a simplified version of Fort Industry in the center. The current flag was adopted in 2025 and was designed by artist Mark Yappueying.

== History ==
Toledo's first flag (1909–1994)

The first flag of Toledo was adopted by the Toledo City Council on January 11, 1909. The flag features a vertical, blue white blue, tricolor with a blue circle and a blue circular outline around a red, simplistic illustration representing Fort Industry. The Mayor at the time, Brand Whitlock, explained the flag's symbolism with the red, white, and blue color scheme as a reference to the colors on the flag of the United States. He also stated that the blue circle outline around Fort Industry represented unity, completeness, eternity, and the state of Ohio.

The second flag was adopted in 1994, and replaces the Fort Industry symbol with the newly updated city seal of Toledo. Mayor Carty Finkbeiner approved the new flag in the run up to Toledo's 160th anniversary that took place in 1997. The design was a vertical, blue white blue, tricolor with the city seal of Toledo in the middle of the white section. The seal was designed in 1873 by engraver O. J. Hopkins. The seal depicts Fort Industry, an old fort in Toledo famous for being one of the first buildings in what would become modern-day Toledo. Fort Industry is pictured on a grassy cliff on the banks of the Maumee River with the flag of the United States flying on a flagpole in the center of the fort. The sun is seen rising on Fort Industry in the seal making the water of the Maumee river and the sky appear yellowish brown. Just above the flagpole is the Toledo's motto in Latin, "LABORARE EST ORARE", which in English translates to, "to work is to pray". The seal is wrapped around the text "SEAL OF THE CITY OF TOLEDO, JANUARY 7, 1837", which was the day that Toledo was founded.

Toledo's second flag (1994–2025)

=== 2022 proposal ===
Jacob Parr's Proposal (2022)

On August 9, 2022, a local graphic designer named Jacob Parr presented his redesign for the city flag at a City Council meeting. The flag came up for a vote on August 16, but the council decided to postpone the vote, citing a lack of public comment on the flag. Gretchen DeBacker, a spokesperson for the city stated that the flag would be brought back up again in some form in 2023. While there was hope within the mayor's administration that the flag would be officially launched by April 2023, this did not happen, partly because of concerns over a lack of public participation. The Toledo Blade's editorial board came out against changing the flag in an August 10, 2022 editorial, saying that the current flag is a "fine flag" and the city does not need a new one.

The 2022 proposal consists of two equal sections cut diagonally in a upwards motion with the top being white and the bottom being light blue, representing the Maumee River. The diagonal shape of the flag is a reference to maritime signal flags, representing Toledo's status as a port city on Lake Erie. An eight pointed star called the "Spark of Industry" is located in the top half of the flag. The eight points on this star represent the historic and current industries of Toledo: agriculture, automotive, glass, transportation, arts, education, energy, and healthcare.

=== 2024 redesign competition ===
On April 19, 2024, the city announced a timeline for a redesign competition. Submissions opened on June 28, 2024, and closed on August 28, 2024. From September 4, 2024, to September 19, 2024, the submissions were reviewed. Then, starting on September 20, and ending on September 22, the finalists were put on display at the Momentum Festival. On January 7, 2025, the city revealed the winner.
