= Achter =

Achter is a surname. Notable people with the surname include:

- A. J. Achter (born 1988), American baseball player and coach
- Kate Achter (born 1986), American basketball coach
- Rod Achter (born 1961), American football player
