= Oregon City School District =

Oregon City School District may refer to:

- Oregon City School District (Ohio)
- Oregon City School District (Oregon)
