= A. J. Achter =

American baseball player and coach (born 1988)

A.J. Achter
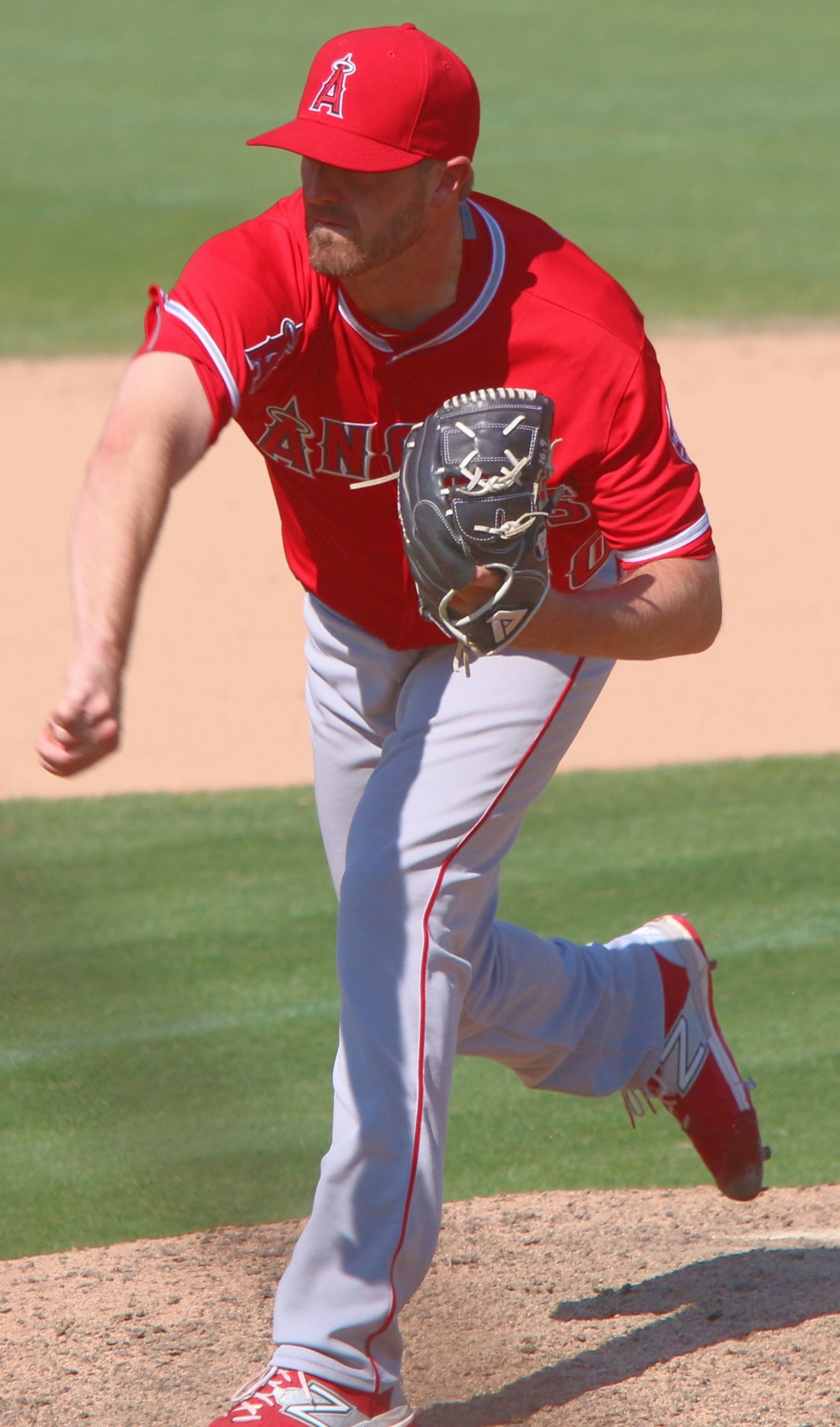
- Achter pitching for the Los Angeles Angels in 2016
- Pitcher
- Born: August 27, 1988 (age 38); Oregon, Ohio, U.S.
- Batted: Right Threw: Right

MLB debut
- September 3, 2014, for the Minnesota Twins

Last appearance
- October 1, 2016, for the Los Angeles Angels

MLB statistics
- Win–loss record: 2–1
- Earned run average: 3.92
- Strikeouts: 33
- Stats at Baseball Reference

Teams
- Minnesota Twins (2014–2015); Los Angeles Angels (2016)

Adam J. Achter (born August 27, 1988) is an American college baseball coach and former professional baseball pitcher. He was most recently the pitching coach at Eastern Michigan University. Achter played college baseball at Michigan State University. He played in Major League Baseball (MLB) for the Minnesota Twins and Los Angeles Angels.

== High school ==
Achter attended Clay High School in Oregon, Ohio, where he starred for the school's baseball and basketball teams. In his senior year, 2007, Achter had a 7–1 win–loss record with a 0.92 earned run average (ERA) and 102 strikeouts, as well as batting .429 and leading his team to their second straight district championship. He threw a no-hitter against Findlay High School, and was named Toledo City League Player of the Year, tournament MVP, first team All-Toledo City League, and first team All-Ohio. Achter was also named Clay's 2007 Male Scholar-Athlete of the Year.

Achter came out of high school rated as the No. 5 high school prospect in Ohio by Baseball America. After not being selected during the 2007 Major League Baseball draft, he enrolled in Michigan State University.

== College ==
Achter made his debut with the Michigan State Spartans in 2008 when he made eight starts and three relief appearances. Over 33.2 innings, Achter went 1–3 and had just a .224 batting average against. On May 4, A.J. made perhaps his best start of the year when he held the Penn State Nittany Lions to one hit over 7.1 innings pitched.

In his sophomore season, Achter tied for the team lead in starts with 14, going 3–6 with 57 strikeouts over 81.1 innings. A.J. allowed only four home runs and 34 earned runs, leading to an ERA of 3.76, second-lowest in the starting rotation. In 2010, he played collegiate summer baseball with the Cotuit Kettleers of the Cape Cod Baseball League and was named a league all-star.

== Professional career ==
=== Minnesota Twins ===
Achter was selected in the 46th round of the 2010 Major League Baseball draft by the Minnesota Twins, but with two years of eligibility remaining at Michigan State and with no signing bonus offered by the Twins, A.J. had no reason to leave college. During the summer, Achter pitched a "lights-out" summer in the Cape Cod League, and two hours before the August signing deadline, the Twins gave Achter a $50,000 bonus to sign, which he accepted.

Achter began his career with the Elizabethton Twins of the Appalachian League, going 0–1 with a 4.91 ERA over 7 1/3 innings pitched. In 2011, Achter spent the season with the Beloit Snappers of the Midwest League. In his first full professional season, A.J. started 19 games, going 5–8 with a 4.52 ERA.

Achter began the 2012 season with the Snappers, this time as a reliever, and quickly found his niche, going 3–1 with a 2.48 ERA over 40 innings. Achter's success earned the pitcher a mid-June promotion to the High-A Fort Myers Miracle of the Florida State League as well as an All-Star selection in the Midwest League. A.J. pitched another 34 1/3 innings while allowing three earned runs, leading to a sparkling 0.79 ERA to go along with 37 strikeouts and a 2–1 record.

As a result of his success the year before, Achter started 2013 with the Double-A New Britain Rock Cats of the Eastern League, carrying a 2–0 record, 2.21 ERA, and 36 strikeouts over 36 2/3 innings of work. He was named to appear in the Eastern League All-Star Game. Achter was promoted to the Triple-A Rochester Red Wings of the International League. While in Rochester, Achter went 1–2 with a 3.04 ERA, .198 batting average against, and 20 strikeouts over 23 2/3 innings, helping the Red Wings to their first playoff appearance since 2006. He was assigned to the Arizona Fall League after the season.

In 2014, Achter began the year at Double-A with New Britain but did not remain there for long; after 6 2/3 scoreless innings in which Achter allowed three hits, one walk, and struck out 11, he was promoted to Triple-A Rochester where he was the only Red Wings player selected to the 2014 Triple-A All-Star Game. On September 1, 2014, Achter's contract was selected by the Twins and he was promoted to the major leagues for the first time in his career. Two days later, he made his Major League debut against the Chicago White Sox, pitching one inning in relief and not allowing a run.

=== Los Angeles Angels ===
On November 19, 2015, the Philadelphia Phillies claimed Achter off of waivers. They designated him for assignment on December 11. On December 17, 2015, Achter was claimed off of waivers by the Los Angeles Angels. On December 23, he was removed from the 40-man roster and sent outright to the Triple-A Salt Lake Bees.

The Angels selected Achter's contract on August 9, 2016. During the 2016 season, Achter posted a 3.11 ERA and 1.46 WHIP in 27 games with the Angels.

=== Detroit Tigers ===
On December 9, 2016, the Detroit Tigers signed Achter to a minor league contract, and was invited to spring training. In 14 appearances for the Double-A Erie SeaWolves, he compiled a 5.34 ERA with 24 strikeouts across 28 2/3 innings pitched. Achter was released by the Tigers organization on June 6, 2017.

=== Somerset Patriots ===
On June 28, 2017, Achter signed with the Somerset Patriots of the Atlantic League of Professional Baseball. In 22 games for the Patriots, he registered a 3–2 record and 4.08 ERA with 38 strikeouts across 35 1/3 innings pitched. Achter announced his retirement on January 8, 2018.

== Coaching career ==
On January 8, 2018, Achter was named the pitching coach at Eastern Michigan University.

== Personal life ==
Achter has two siblings, Amanda and Austin. Austin is younger and played baseball and graduated from Ohio State University. His parents are Rod and Cindy. Rod was a wide receiver at the University of Toledo and eventually was drafted by the Minnesota Vikings. A.J. is married to fellow Michigan State Spartan alumnus, Kaiti Nester. They have a purebred Shih Tzu, Izzy Nester-Achter. Izzy is named after Tom Izzo. A.J. and Kaiti live in Brighton, Michigan.
