= Justin Thomas (baseball) =

American baseball player (born 1984)

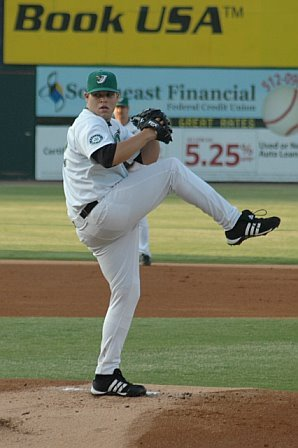
- Justin Thomas pitching for West Tenn Diamond Jaxx
- Pitcher
- Born: January 18, 1984 (age 42); Toledo, Ohio, U.S.
- Batted: Left Threw: Left

Professional debut
- MLB: September 1, 2008, for the Seattle Mariners
- NPB: July 31, 2013, for the Hokkaido Nippon-Ham Fighters
- KBO: July 31, 2014, for the Kia Tigers
- CPBL: March 25, 2015, for the Uni-President 7-Eleven Lions

Last appearance
- MLB: September 24, 2012, for the New York Yankees
- NPB: October 1, 2013, for the Hokkaido Nippon-Ham Fighters
- KBO: October 16, 2014, for the Kia Tigers
- CPBL: October 2, 2015, for the Uni-President 7-Eleven Lions

MLB statistics
- Win–loss record: 0–2
- Earned run average: 6.93
- Strikeouts: 14

NPB statistics
- Win–loss record: 0-2
- Earned run average: 8.71
- Strikeouts: 6

KBO statistics
- Win–loss record: 2-2
- Earned run average: 4.44
- Strikeouts: 51

CPBL statistics
- Win–loss record: 5–8
- Earned run average: 3.83
- Strikeouts: 92
- Stats at Baseball Reference

Teams
- Seattle Mariners (2008); Pittsburgh Pirates (2010); Boston Red Sox (2012); New York Yankees (2012); Hokkaido Nippon Ham Fighters (2013); Kia Tigers (2014); Uni-President 7-Eleven Lions (2015)

Justin Joseph Thomas (born January 18, 1984) is an American former professional baseball pitcher. He played in Major League Baseball (MLB) for the Seattle Mariners, Pittsburgh Pirates, Boston Red Sox, and New York Yankees. He also played in Nippon Professional Baseball (NPB) for the Hokkaido Nippon-Ham Fighters, the KBO League for the Kia Tigers, and the Chinese Professional Baseball League (CPBL) for the Uni-President 7-Eleven Lions.

== Amateur career ==
=== High school ===
Thomas attended Clay High School and Cardinal Stritch High School in Oregon, Ohio and was a four-year letterman for the varsity baseball team and set the school record for most home runs and tied the school record for most home runs in a season. Thomas was named to the USSSA World Series first-team all-tournament team and was a two-time first-team All-GLL selection. He was also named first-team all-district and was an honorable mention selection as a pitcher and helped lead Clay to a league championship. He was named team MVP and received the James F. O’Brian Award for Best Male Student Athlete. In addition to being a four-year letterman in baseball, he lettered in golf and was a three-year letter-winner in basketball.

=== College ===
Upon graduation, Thomas attended Youngstown State University from 2002 to 2005. The lefty starter helped the Penguins capture a Horizon League Title in the 2004, pitching the team into the finals and making their first ever appearance in the College World Series. In 2005, he was named First Team All-League and Horizon Pitcher of the Year boasting a 7-5 record with a 3.42 ERA and four complete games. He left Youngstown State ranked second in strikeouts with 250 and is the only pitcher in school history to pitch back-to-back seasons of at least seven wins.

==== College accolades ====
- 2003 Second-team All-Horizon League 5-5 4.87 ERA 80 strikeouts
- 2004 First-team All-Horizon League 7-3 5.11 ERA 4 CG 82 strikeouts
- 2005 First-team All-Horizon League 7-5 3.42 ERA 4 CG 83 strikeouts
- 2005 Horizon League Pitcher of the Year
- Three-time Horizon League pitcher of the week

== Professional career ==
=== Seattle Mariners ===
Thomas was drafted by the Seattle Mariners as the 113th overall pick of the 2005 Major League Baseball draft. After signing with Seattle in June of that year, Thomas made his professional debut for the Everett AquaSox of the Low-A Northwest League.

In 2006, Thomas led all Mariners farmhands with 14 wins, finished second with 162 strikeouts and sixth with a 3.73 ERA. He was named the California League Pitcher of the Week in August and MiLB.com's Class-A Advanced Playoff Performer of the Year.

In 2007, Thomas was promoted to Double-A West Tenn Diamond Jaxx, but began the season on the disabled list with a strained left elbow. Upon being activated from the DL, Thomas struggled with control problems, posting a 4-9 record with a 5.51 ERA and a career high 61 walks.

In 2008, Thomas as he reduced his ERA with Double-A West Tenn to 4.32 and increased his strikeouts to walks ratio from 100 strikeouts/61 base on balls in '07 to 106 strikeouts/56 base on balls in '08. He was placed on the disabled list once again with a left hand laceration but came back to work out of the bullpen. Thomas received a mid-season call up to Triple-A Tacoma Rainiers posting a career low 3.71 ERA.

On September 1, 2008 the Seattle Mariners purchased Thomas' contract from Triple-A Tacoma. Thomas made his major league debut that day, taking on the Texas Rangers. In one inning of work, he gave up no runs, no hits, no walks, and struck out Marlon Byrd to end the game. Thomas pitched the rest of September with the Mariners, posting an 0-1 record and a 6.75 ERA.

In 2009, Thomas was re-signed by the Seattle Mariners to a one-year contract and was placed on the 40-man roster.

=== Pittsburgh Pirates ===
On October 29, 2009, Thomas was claimed off waivers by the Pittsburgh Pirates.

In November, Thomas was designated for assignment. He cleared waivers and was outrighted to Triple-A.

On June 24, 2010, he was called up from Triple-A to replace Dana Eveland, who was designated for assignment. On September 11, 2010, he gave up a walk-off home run to Joey Votto of the Cincinnati Reds.

Thomas signed a minor league contract with an invitation to 2011 spring training with the Pirates.

=== Boston Red Sox ===
The Boston Red Sox signed Thomas to a minor league contract on November 22, 2011. On April 4, 2012, the Red Sox selected Thomas' contract, adding him to their major league roster for their regular-season opener against the Detroit Tigers the following day. Thomas was optioned on April 27 to clear roster space for Rich Hill, who had recovered from Tommy John surgery.

=== New York Yankees ===
On May 12, 2012, Thomas was claimed off waivers by the New York Yankees. On September 1, Thomas was called up from Triple-A when the major league rosters expanded. Thomas was designated for assignment on September 25.

=== Oakland Athletics ===
On November 21, 2012, Thomas signed a minor league deal with the Oakland Athletics that included an invitation to spring training. Thomas exercised an opt-out clause in his contract on July 1, 2013.

=== Hokkaido Nippon-Ham Fighters ===
On July 8, 2013, Thomas signed with the Hokkaido Nippon-Ham Fighters of Nippon Professional Baseball.

=== Los Angeles Angels of Anaheim ===
On January 5, 2014, Thomas signed a minor league contract with the Los Angeles Angels of Anaheim. He began the season with the Triple-A Salt Lake Bees. The Angels released Thomas on July 25.

=== Kia Tigers ===
Thomas signed with the Kia Tigers of the KBO League after his release from the Angels. He pitched to a 4.44 ERA with 51 strikeouts in 46 2/3 innings with the team. On December 27, 2014, Thomas was released.

=== Uni-President 7-Eleven Lions ===
Thomas pitched for the Uni-President 7-Eleven Lions of the Chinese Professional Baseball League in 2015, going 5–8 with a 3.83 ERA in 22 starts.
