= Jordan Kovacs =

American football player and coach (born 1990)

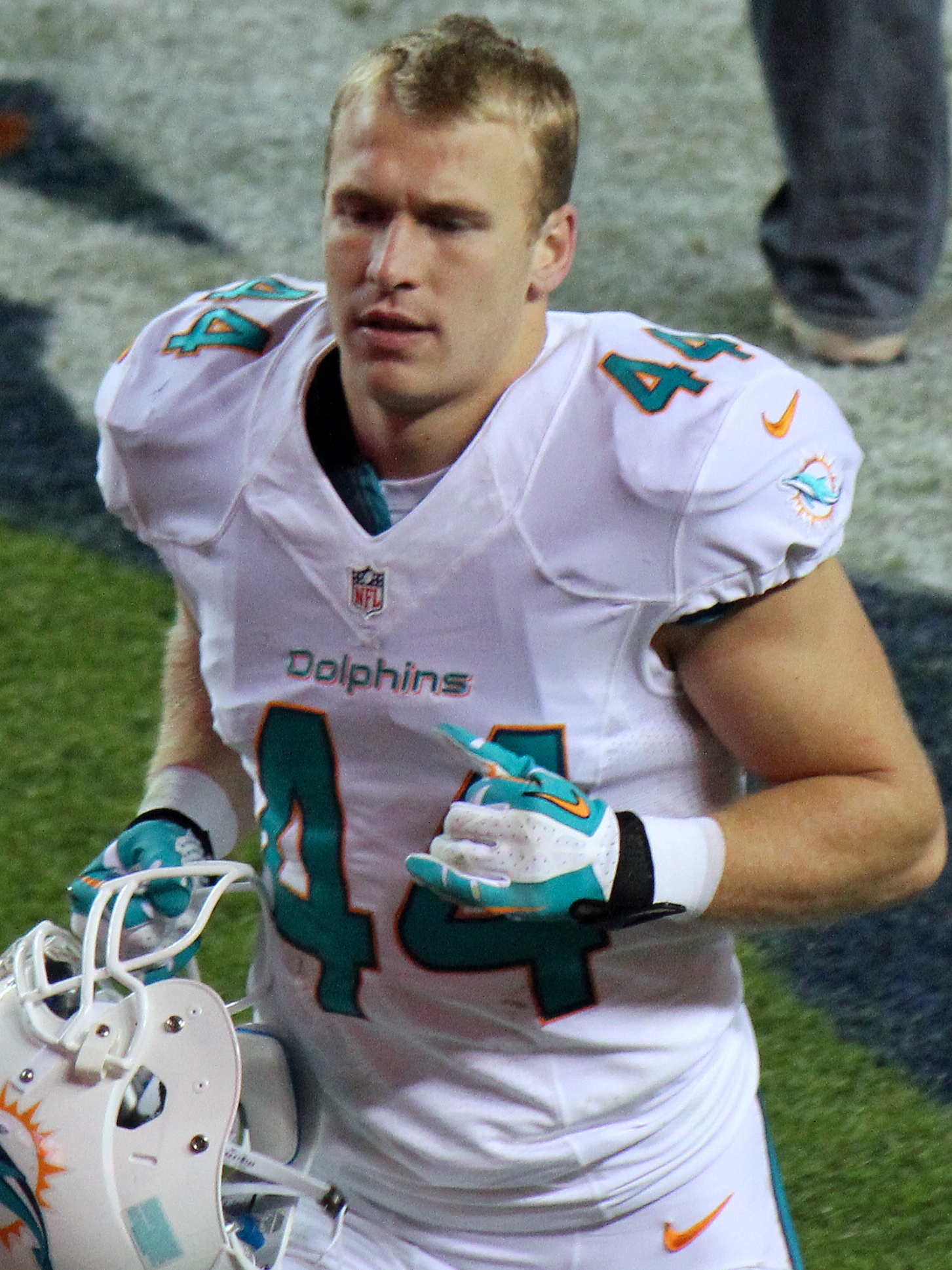
- Kovacs with the Miami Dolphins in 2014

Cincinnati Bengals
- Title: Secondary/safeties coach

Personal information
- Born: June 12, 1990 (age 36); Curtice, Ohio, U.S.
- Listed height: 5 ft 10 in (1.78 m)
- Listed weight: 208 lb (94 kg)

Career information
- Position: Safety (No. 44, 32)
- High school: Oregon (OH) Clay
- College: Michigan
- NFL draft: 2013: undrafted

Career history

Playing
- Miami Dolphins (2013); Philadelphia Eagles (2014)*; Miami Dolphins (2014–2015); Kansas City Chiefs (2016)*; Los Angeles Rams (2016)*
- * Offseason or practice squad member only

Coaching
- Michigan (2017–2018) Defense and special teams assistant; Cincinnati Bengals (2019–2021) Defensive quality control; Cincinnati Bengals (2022–2023) Assistant linebackers coach; Cincinnati Bengals (2024–present) Secondary/safeties coach

Awards and highlights
- Second-team All-Big Ten (2012); 2009 Freshman All-America (CFN 2nd team); 2009 Freshman All-Big Ten (TSN)

Career NFL statistics
- Total tackles: 11
- Sacks: 1
- Stats at Pro Football Reference

Jordan David Kovacs (born June 12, 1990) is an American professional football coach and former player who is the secondary/safeties coach for the Cincinnati Bengals of the National Football League (NFL). He played in the NFL as a safety for the Miami Dolphins. Kovacs played college football for the Michigan Wolverines.

He was a walk-on who earned 2009 CollegeFootballNews.com Freshman All-America second team recognition and 2009 Sporting News Freshman All-Big Ten honors for the 2009 Wolverines while being the second-leading tackler on the team. Granted a scholarship by the 2010 team for his second year, he was the second-leading tackler in the Big Ten Conference and was selected as a 2010 All-Conference honorable mention. He was also a 2011 All-Big Ten honorable mention for the 2011 team. He served the 2012 team as captain and was also a 2012 All-Big Ten second team selection and a 2012 Academic All-Big Ten honoree. He was signed by the Dolphins as an undrafted free agent in 2013.

== Background ==
Kovacs, a Hungarian American, attended Clay High School, which is the rival high school of former Wolverine teammate Kevin Koger. In high school, he earned varsity letters in basketball as a sophomore and junior. He also earned All-City recognition in track and field three times (first team as a senior, second team as a junior and honorable mention as a sophomore) and was a four-year letterman. He qualified for the Ohio State championships in the 4 × 400 meter relay. He was a three-year letterman in football, where he earned All-Ohio academic honors and All-district honors as both a wide receiver and defensive back.

He was not recruited by any Division I schools as a high school football player, but he was recruited by some Division II schools. Kovacs only had two campus visits: Division II Hillsdale and Toledo (a school 13 miles from his high school). By the time he completed his college applications, even Hillsdale had lost interest in him. His father placed a call to Michigan Director of Football Operations Brad Labadie after Jordan was wait listed and got him to agree to review a homemade highlight reel. As his graduation neared, Kovacs shook hands with Andy Boyd, a Toledo coach, on a preferred walk-on spot. That same afternoon in June 2008, Labadie called to confirm that Kovacs had been admitted from the wait list. The admission came without an athletic scholarship. Labadie encouraged Jordan to attend walk-on tryouts.

== College career ==
=== Redshirt (2008) ===
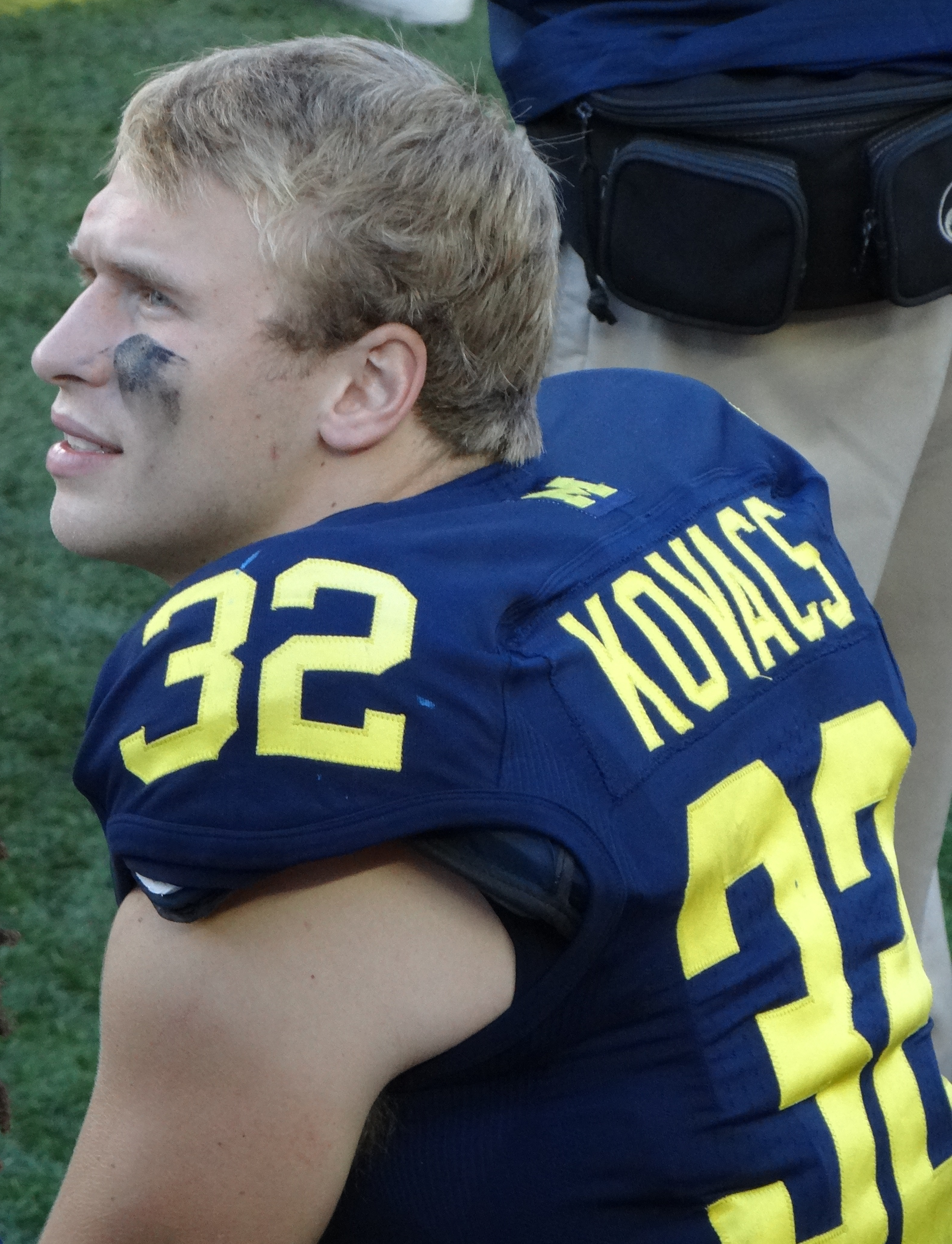
Kovacs in 2012 at Michigan Stadium

Kovacs initially passed the walk-on tryouts, but he had to pass the physical with Paul "Schmidty" Schmidt, who had been a trainer since Jordan's father Lou had played and been on the coaching staff at Michigan. He had had surgery to repair cartilage damage in high school, but that did not alleviate his problems. When Jordan responded yes to a question about whether he had had any surgeries in the prior 12 months, it triggered a line of questioning about his senior season meniscus surgery. He did not make the 2008 Wolverines due to a knee problem, but was advised to try out again after his knee healed. After discovering a torn meniscus, he had a second knee surgery, which was successful. He attended every game that season in his family's season ticket section.

=== Freshman (2009) ===
In 2009, he was one of the most highly regarded walk-ons in the nation, and emerged from a group of Michigan football players who referred to themselves as "The Walk-On Nation". His debut on September 5 against the Western Michigan was on special teams. The following week, he registered 31 plays against Notre Dame after starting safety Michael Williams suffered leg cramps. He made his first start on September 26 against Indiana. On October 3 of that season, he had 17 tackles against Michigan State in the annual Paul Bunyan Trophy. He posted ten tackles and made his first career interception on November 14 against Wisconsin. That season, he played free safety before being switched to strong safety. He started one game at free safety and seven at strong safety over the course of the season. He finished the season as the second leading tackler for the 2009 Wolverines. He earned 2009 CollegeFootballNews.com Freshman All-America second team recognition and 2009 Sporting News Freshman All-Big Ten honors. He was also a Rudy Award candidate.

=== Sophomore (2010) ===
Kovacs earned a scholarship at the beginning of the 2010 NCAA Division I FBS football season. In the second game of the season on September 11 against Notre Dame in the Michigan – Notre Dame football rivalry game, Kovacs recorded his first interception of the season and second of his career as part of a 10-tackle effort. On October 16 he recorded 2.5 tackles for a loss against Iowa. After eight games in the 2010 season he ranked second in the Big Ten Conference in tackles. On November 18, he was nominated for the Burlsworth Trophy, which was a newly created award for the most outstanding player to have begun his career as a walk on. On November 20, he posted his first career quarterback sack during a season-high twelve tackle performance against Wisconsin. With one week remaining on the conference schedule, the performance tied Kovacs for third-overall in the Big Ten, gave Kovacs a wide lead among Big Ten underclassman (8.64 vs. 7.55 per game over the next highest performer) and extended his lead among Big Ten defensive backs (8.64 vs 8.27). In the final game of the regular season on November 27 against Ohio State in the annual Michigan – Ohio State football rivalry game, Kovacs recorded his second interception of the season and third of his career as part of a 17-tackle effort. He collected a career-best 41 return yards following the interception. In The Game, Kovacs tied a career-high with 17 total tackles including a new career-high 9 solo tackles. Kovacs ended the 2010 Big Ten Conference football season ranked second in the conference to teammate Jonas Mouton in total tackles. However, he led the team in solo tackles. Following the Big Ten Conference season, he was selected as an honorable mention All-Conference selection by the media.

=== Junior (2011) ===
When Brady Hoke took over as Michigan head coach for the 2011 NCAA Division I FBS football season, Kovacs impressed him quickly. Kovacs was one of the first five players named as a starter for the 2011 team. In the September 3, 2011 season opener against Western Michigan at Michigan Stadium, Kovacs forced a fumble that was recovered and advanced for a touchdown. Although the game was ended by mutual agreement in the third quarter due to inclement weather, Kovacs recorded 10 tackles, including two sacks. He was named the Lott Trophy impact player of the week. At first, the stats for the game were considered official by the Big Ten Conference and the University of Michigan, but the NCAA has vacated the statistics for this game because three quarters were not completed. However, at the conclusion of the regular season, the NCAA reversed course and ruled that since the game is counting for win–loss record, the statistics will be counted by the NCAA. On September 10, against Notre Dame, during the first night game ever played at Michigan Stadium, he tallied an interception, and eight tackles. When it became evident that the defense had improved markedly from the prior season, he and fellow safety Thomas Gordon were credited as being the "leaders of the defense". On October 8, against Northwestern, Kovacs posted two solo tackles for a loss, both on fourth down. Kovacs suffered a knee injury that sidelined him for the October 29 game against Purdue. Kovacs had been one of twenty quarterfinalists for the Lott impact player of the year. Kovacs was named as one of 10 semifinalists for the 2011 Burlsworth Trophy on November 22. Following the 2011 Big Ten Conference football season, he earned All-Big Ten Conference honorable mention recognition from the media and was selected as the Big Ten Sportsmanship Award recipient for the Michigan program. Kovacs earned 2011 Fall Academic All-Big Ten recognition along with 10 teammates. In the January 3, 2012 Sugar Bowl 23–20 overtime victory against Virginia Tech, he led the team with 11 tackles. Kovacs finished among the conference leaders in several statistics: sacks/game (.33, 17th), tackles/game (6.2, 30th) and fumbles forced/game (.17, t-9th).

=== Senior (2012) ===
Kovacs was elected team captain. He was selected to the preseason watchlist for the Bronko Nagurski Trophy (best defensive player). At a ceremony on November 10, Kovacs' jersey number was changed from 32 to the previously retired number 11 which was recirculated as a "Michigan Football Legend" jersey in honor of Francis ("Whitey), Albert and Alvin Wistert. He was interviewed as part of a 13-minute segment that appeared on the edition of November 18 of 60 Minutes about the business of college football. Kovacs was a second team All-Big Ten selection by the coaches and an honorable mention selection by the media. On November 27, he was named a finalist for the Burlsworth Trophy. At the December 3 team banquet, Kovacs earned team MVP for the season. He earned Academic All-Big Ten recognition in 2012. Following the season, he participated in the February 2, 2013 Texas vs. the Nation All-Star Bowl.

== Professional career ==
Pre-draft measurables
Height	Weight	Arm length	Hand span	Wingspan	40-yard dash	10-yard split	20-yard split	20-yard shuttle	Three-cone drill	Vertical jump	Broad jump	Bench press
5 ft 10 5/8 in (1.79 m)	205 lb (93 kg)	29 3/4 in (0.76 m)	9 1/2 in (0.24 m)	6 ft 0 in (1.83 m)	4.62 s	1.62 s	2.62 s	4.25 s	6.81 s	35.0 in (0.89 m)	10 ft 2 in (3.10 m)	17 reps
All values from Pro Day

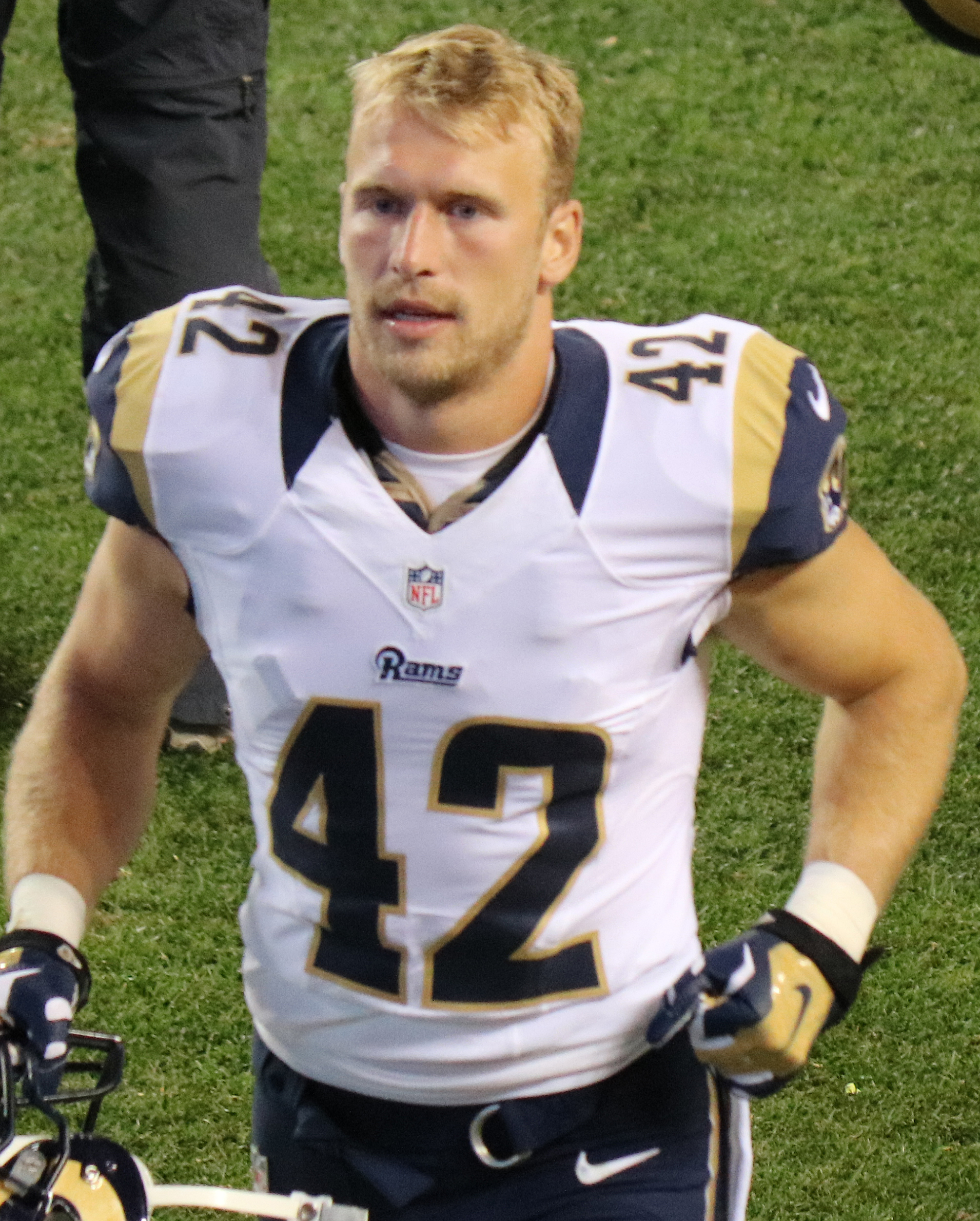
Kovacs with the Los Angeles Rams in 2016

=== Miami Dolphins and Philadelphia Eagles ===
Kovacs signed an undrafted free agent contract with the Miami Dolphins following the 2013 NFL draft. Kovacs was assigned to the Dolphins' practice squad to start the 2013 NFL season. Kovacs was promoted to the 53-man roster in week 5 of 2013. Kovacs had a tackle in his debut against the Baltimore Ravens on October 6.

He was released at the end of training camp in 2014. He was signed to the Philadelphia Eagles practice squad on October 6. On November 4, he was signed off the Eagles practice squad by the Dolphins, and was placed on the active 53 man roster. He had seven tackles over the course of the season, including 5 in December 28 week 17 contest against the New York Jets.

On October 18, 2015, Kovacs recorded his first sack against Zach Mettenberger of the Tennessee Titans. Towards the end of the season he was expected to be released by the Miami Dolphins with the expectation that he would be placed on the practice squad once he cleared waivers.

=== Kansas City Chiefs ===
Following the 2015 season, he was signed to a futures contract by the Kansas City Chiefs. On May 10, 2016, he was released.

=== Los Angeles Rams ===
On August 5, 2016, Kovacs signed with the Los Angeles Rams. On September 3, 2016, he was waived by the Rams as part of final roster cuts.

== Coaching career ==
=== Michigan ===
In 2017, Kovacs joined the Michigan Wolverines staff in a role assisting the team's defensive and special teams coaches.

=== Cincinnati Bengals ===
On February 28, 2019, he joined the Cincinnati Bengals staff as the defensive quality control assistant. He assumed Al Golden's linebackers coaching duties for the team's week 10 game in 2020 against the Pittsburgh Steelers due to Golden missing the game for COVID-19 pandemic protocols. In week 11 of the 2020 season against the Washington Football Team, he assumed safeties coach duties after Robert Livingston missed the game for COVID-19 protocols.

On February 8, 2024, he was promoted to secondary/safeties coach.

== Personal life ==
His father Louis, who was a walk-on for Michigan coach Bo Schembechler, lettered for the 1982 Michigan Wolverines football team. He subsequently served two seasons as a graduate assistant for Schembechler. Lou is married to Susan Kovacs. Jordan wears #32, the reverse of his father's #23. Kovacs has three siblings, Aaron, Kayla, and Morgan. His older brother Aaron played his freshman season for the 2007 Toledo Rockets. His family regularly brought him to watch Michigan home games when he was growing up. The family regularly sat in Section 27 of Michigan Stadium, on the north side of the press box. During Jordan's playing career at Michigan, the family sat underneath the scoreboard. The first Michigan game Kovacs watched was Lloyd Carr's first game as coach of Michigan Wolverines football for the 1995 Wolverines, which was a memorable 18-point comeback against Virginia.
