= Rod Achter =

American gridiron football player (born 1961)

Profile
- Position: Wide receiver

Personal information
- Born: February 14, 1961 (age 65); Oregon, Ohio, U.S.
- Listed height: 6 ft 1 in (1.85 m)
- Listed weight: 196 lb (89 kg)

Career information
- High school: Clay (Oregon)
- College: Toledo
- NFL draft: 1983: 9th round, 239th overall pick

Career history
- 1983: Minnesota Vikings*
- 1984: Ottawa Rough Riders
- * Offseason or practice squad member only

Rodney Lee Achter (born February 14, 1961), better known as Rod Achter, is a former gridiron football wide receiver. Achter was drafted by the Minnesota Vikings in the ninth round of the 1983 NFL draft with the 239th overall pick. He later played for the Canadian Football League's Ottawa Rough Riders in 1984, recording three catches for 10 yards in two regular season games.
