= Clay High School (Oregon, Ohio) =

Public high school in Oregon, Ohio, United States

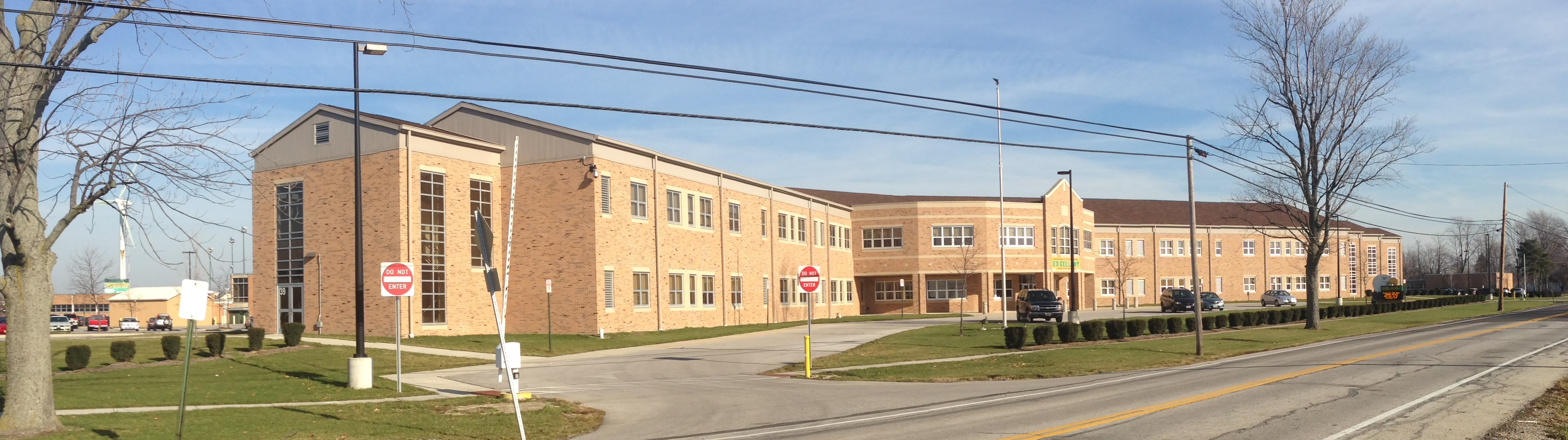
- Clay High School

Location
- 5665 Seaman Road; Oregon, (Lucas County), Ohio 43616-2613; United States; 41°39′14″N 83°24′46″W

Information
- Type: Public, Coeducational high school
- Established: 1927
- School district: Oregon City School District
- NCES District ID: 3904460
- Local authority: Oregon City Schools; City of Oregon, Ohio
- Superintendent: Jeff Straka
- School code: OH-044602-006494
- NCES School ID: 390446001475
- Dean: Scott Wamer
- Principal: Greg Sigg
- Teaching staff: 71.00 (FTE)
- Grades: 9-12
- Student to teacher ratio: 15.61
- Colors: Green and Gold
- Slogan: Once An Eagle, Always An Eagle
- Fight song: On Clay High School
- Athletics conference: Northern Lakes League
- Sports: Football, Soccer, Volleyball, Track and Field, Basketball, Wrestling, Baseball, Golf, Tennis, Hockey, Lacrosse, Equestrian and Swim
- Mascot: Eagle
- Team name: Eagles
- Yearbook: Crystal
- Athletic Director: Joseph Kiss
- Website: chs.oregoncityschools.org

Clay High School is a public high school in Oregon, Ohio, United States, east of Toledo. It is the only high school in the Oregon City School District. The school is named for Jeremiah Clay, who donated his farmland for the school to be built on.

Over the last few years, the Clay High School Campus has undergone remodeling. An addition was made to the main building, while the old elementary and the Annex were demolished. The Main building was also gutted and redone.

The school colors are green and yellow. Their nickname is the Eagles, after their mascots, Eddy and Edna the Eagle. Clay was a member of the Great Lakes League until 2003 when they joined the Toledo City League. Clay's joining of the TCL made them the second non-Toledo team to join the league (Cardinal Stritch 1971-1994), though they had played the Toledo City League schools for years before joining. In 2011 Clay joined the newly formed Three Rivers Athletic Conference as a charter member. The Three Rivers Athletic Conference shut down in 2023, which made Clay, Findlay High School, Fremont Ross High School, and Whitmer High School join the Northern Lakes League.

== Demographics ==
For the 2020–21 academic year, Clay High School (Oregon, Ohio) enrolled 1,161 students, according to the National Center for Education Statistics. The school employed 72.3 full-time equivalent educators, resulting in a student to teacher ratio of 16.1:1.

Enrollment by race and ethnicity (2020–21)
Race and ethnicity^{†}	Enrolled pupils	Percentage
African American	32	2.76%
Asian	23	1.98%
Hispanic	154	13.26%
Native American	0	0%
White	936	80.62%
Native Hawaiian, Pacific islander	0	0%
Multi-race	16	1.38%
Total	1,161	100%
^{†} "Hispanic" includes Hispanics of any race. All other categories refer to non-Hispanics.

Enrollment by gender (2020–21)
Gender	Enrolled pupils	Percentage
Female	565	48.66%
Male	596	51.34%
Non-binary	0	0%
Total	1,161	100%

Enrollment by grade (2020–21)
Grade	Enrolled pupils	Percentage
9	273	23.51%
10	315	27.13%
11	290	24.98%
12	283	24.38%
Ungraded	0	0%
Total	1,161	100%

== Career Technical Education Programs ==
Clay High School offers Career Technical Education (CTE) programs, also sometimes referred to as Career Tech, as a form of vocational education. The current CTE programs offered are:

- Automotive Technologies
- Construction Trades
- Cosmetology
- Culinary Arts
- Engineering Design & Development
- Environmental & Agriculture
- Integrated Machining & Engineering
- Marketing
- Medical Technologies
- Musical Theatre
- Programming & Software Development
- Robotics

== Athletics ==
=== Ohio High School Athletic Association Team State Championships ===
- Boys Baseball – 1979

== Performing Arts ==
=== Marching, Concert, and Symphonic Band ===
The modern band program at Clay was started by Clay graduate and saxophonist Nancy Fox Bricker in 1952, cementing the band as a marching band known as the Clay High School Fighting Eagle Marching Band. After Mrs. Bricker became ill and her husband assumed directing duties, Clay graduate Charles Neal was made the new director in 1967. The traditions of the Clay band were continued and expanded by its next director, Clay graduate Brian Gyuras, who was named the new director in 1999 and brought back student direction of the band. The current band director is Joseph Kuzdzal, who has held the position since 2019.

The band performs at Clay football games and, during the off-season, performs concerts and other parades. The band is split into two sections based on grade level, the concert band for freshmen and sophomores, and the symphonic band for juniors and seniors. The band also has multiple subgroups in the form of jazz band and pep band. The band also claims the largest Alumni band in Ohio, which performs every other year during the homecoming football game.

=== Concert Chorale ===
Clay High School includes a choir program in the form of Concert Chorale. The program educates students in various subjects of good musicianship and contributes to an enrolled student's fine arts credit needed to graduate. The program also puts on multiple concerts throughout the school year and performs at other events. The current director of the program is Thom Sneed.

The Concert Chorale is also host to Varsity Voices, an audition-based group that learns additional music outside of the school day to perform at concerts. The program also formerly had two gender based groups, a men's chorus and an all-female chorus named "Bel Canto".

=== Theater Department ===
Aside from the Musical Theatre CTE program, Clay High School also has a theatre group in the form of the CHS Limelighters. The group typically puts on three productions per school year, and membership is open to the Clay student body. The group puts on a combination of musicals, plays, cabarets, and one-acts and is under the direction of Victoria Monhollen-Bandeen, Elizabeth Gibson, and Leah Walsh.

== Notable alumni ==
- A. J. Achter - Former pitcher Michigan State University, currently plays for the Los Angeles Angels
- Chris Fussell - Former pitcher with the Baltimore Orioles
- Jordan Kovacs - Former safety and captain for the University of Michigan football team, currently the Head Secondary/Safeties Coach for the Cincinnati Bengals
- Justin Thomas - Pitcher with the Uni-President 7-Eleven Lions of the Chinese Professional Baseball League
- Mason Heintschel - Quarterback for the Pittsburgh Panthers football team
