= Cardinal Stritch Catholic High School (Ohio) =

Private school in Oregon, Ohio, United States

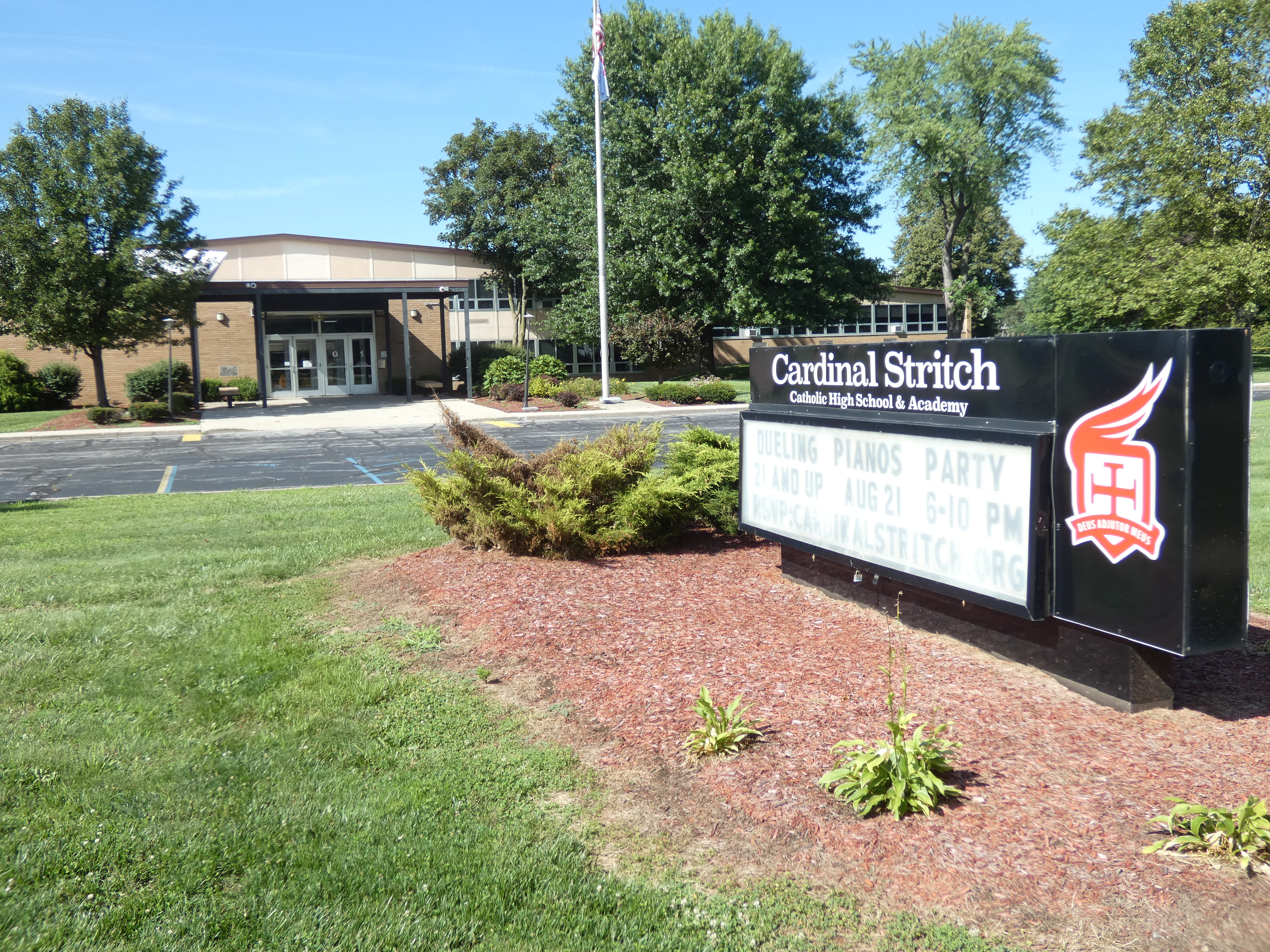
- Main entrance

Location
- 3225 Pickle Road; Oregon, (Lucas County), Ohio 43616; United States; 41°37′50″N 83°28′11″W

Information
- Type: Private, coeducational
- Religious affiliation: Roman Catholic
- Established: 1961
- Oversight: Roman Catholic Diocese of Toledo
- President: William Berry
- Principal: Malinda Siers
- Teaching staff: 40
- Grades: PreK–12th
- Enrollment: 69 (2026)
- Colors: Red and black
- Mascot: Cardinal
- Accreditation: North Central Association of Colleges and Schools
- Website: cardinalstritch.org

Cardinal Stritch Catholic High School is a private, Catholic, coeducational, college prep secondary school located in Oregon, Ohio. It is sponsored by the Roman Catholic Diocese of Toledo.

Cardinal Stritch Catholic High School will close at the end of December 2026.

== History ==
Cardinal Stritch Catholic High School's groundbreaking ceremony took place on September 21, 1960, with Bishop George J. Rehring of the Roman Catholic Diocese of Toledo turning the first spadeful of earth. The school was named in honor of Samuel Cardinal Stritch, who served as the second Bishop of Toledo from 1921 to 1930 before becoming Archbishop of Milwaukee and later Archbishop of Chicago. The school's first official ninth grade place entered the building in the fall of 1961.

During the 2009–2010 school year, Cardinal Stritch expanded its educational offerings to include a preschool through eighth grade program. Working with several nearby parishes, the school established Kateri Catholic Academy on its campus. The academy subsequently developed into one of the largest Catholic elementary schools within the Diocese of Toledo.

On October 7, 2026, school officials announced that Cardinal Stritch Catholic High School will close at the end of December 2026. The announcement followed a recommendation from the school board, as well as the Diocese of Toledo. Cardinal Stritch cited that they currently have enrollment of only 69 students, as well as several years of financial instability.

== Accolades ==
Cardinal Stritch Catholic High School was recognized by the Catholic High School Honor Roll as one of the Top 50 Catholic High Schools in the United States in 2006, 2007, 2008 and 2009. The recognition was based on criteria including academic excellence, Catholic identity and civic education.

In 2018, Cardinal Stritch was recognized as a Top Workplace by The Blade and Energage.

== Athletics ==
=== State championships ===
- Boys wrestling - 1985

== Notable alumni ==
- Bryan Smolinski - former professional ice hockey player
- Justin Thomas - former professional baseball player
