= Oregon City School District (Ohio) =

School district in Ohio, United States

Address
- 5721 Seaman Street Oregon, Ohio, 43616; United States
- Coordinates: 41°38′57″N 83°27′41″W

District information
- Type: Public
- Motto: "Inspire students to Dream, Discover, Learn, and Achieve!"
- Grades: KG–12
- Established: 1850; 176 years ago
- Superintendent: Jeff Straka
- Asst. superintendent(s): Jim Jurski
- Schools: 6
- NCES District ID: 3904460

Students and staff
- Students: 3,318 (2024–2025)
- Teachers: 213.10 (on an FTE basis) (2024–2025)
- Staff: 217.87 (on an FTE basis) (2024–2025)
- Student–teacher ratio: 15.57 (2024–2025)
- Colors: Green and Gold

Other information
- Website: www.oregoncityschools.org

Oregon Public Schools is a school district in Northwest Ohio. The school district serves students, who live in the cities of Oregon, Curtice, and Jerusalem Twp. in Lucas County. The superintendent as of 2025/26 is Dr. Jim Fritz.

== Schools ==
=== Grades 9-12 ===
- Clay High School

=== Grades 5-8 ===
- Fassett Junior High
- Eisenhower Intermediate School

=== Grades K-4 ===
- Coy Elementary
- Starr Elementary
- Jerusalem Elementary
- Wynn Elementary
