= Oregon, Ohio =

City in Lucas County, Ohio

- City
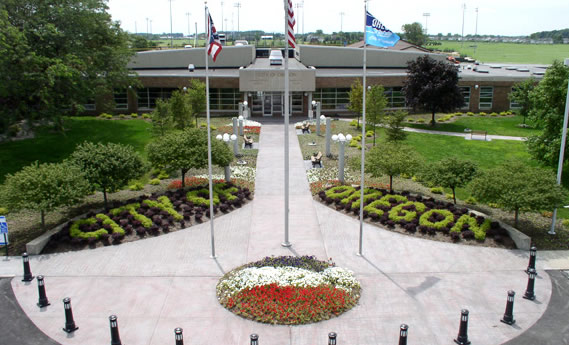
- Oregon Municipal Building

- Motto: "Oregon: Opportunity on the Bay”
- Interactive map of Oregon, Ohio
- Location within Ohio Location within the United States
- Coordinates: 41°38′57″N 83°27′41″W
- Country: United States
- State: Ohio
- County: Lucas

Government
  - Type: Mayor-Council

Area
  - Total: 28.90 sq mi (74.85 km^{2})
  - Land: 28.52 sq mi (73.87 km^{2})
  - Water: 0.38 sq mi (0.98 km^{2})
- Elevation: 594 ft (181 m)

Population (2020)
  - Total: 19,950
  - Density: 699.5/sq mi (270.06/km^{2})
- Time zone: UTC-5 (Eastern (EST))
  - Summer (DST): UTC-4 (EDT)
- ZIP codes: 43605, 43616, 43618
- Area code: 419/567
- FIPS code: 39-58730
- GNIS feature ID: 1086529
- Website: oregonohio.org

Oregon (/ˈɒrɪɡɒn/ ORR-ih-gon) is a city in Lucas County, Ohio, United States. Located on Lake Erie, it is a suburb of Toledo lying east of the city and is home to Maumee Bay State Park. The population was 19,950 at the 2020 census.

== History ==
Oregon was once part of the Great Black Swamp. The swamp area was rich with oak, hickory, ash, walnut, elm and maple trees. This led to the establishment of numerous sawmills and settlements. The harvested forests created rich farmland, but the area remained swampy and there was a need for storm drainage. Major ditches were constructed, usually along roadways that followed the path of old Indian trails. These ditches continue to provide storm drainage today, carrying storm water into Maumee Bay.

"The town was named Oregon by Pierre M. Irving, a nephew of Washington Irving, author of the popular book Astoria. This book attracted considerable interest in John Jacob Astor's trading lands which were located in what is now the state of Oregon. The story, however, is an account of Astor's fur trading in the territory of Oregon; but since the nephew was representing Astor's interest in fur trading east of the Maumee River, he succeeded in having the town named Oregon. In 1838, Mr. Irving, accompanied by his wife, went to New York expecting to remain there for the summer; but for some reason he never returned." Quoted in the History of Oregon and Jerusalem book, authored by Josephine Fassett.

The first government was Oregon Township, formed in 1838. The land was surveyed and there were public sales for settlements. The area that was the township, is now the City of Oregon, which is bounded on the west by the City of Toledo, the North by Maumee Bay/Lake Erie, on the east by Jerusalem Township (Lucas County) and on the South by the City of Northwood (Wood County). In 1856 the township took ownership of two cemeteries which remain owned by the City today.

The 1800s and 1900s saw the development of an extensive rail system. The Port of Toledo began operations on the south bank of the Maumee River in the early 1800s and developed port operations on the Maumee Bay in Oregon in 1955. These operations continue in the Northwest area of the city.

Because of the water, rail, and surface transportation access available in the city, two major refineries, British Petroleum (BP) and Sun Marketing opened in Oregon around the turn of the century. These two refineries have historically been two of the city's largest employers..

The northwestern end of the city grew as an industrial center with a coal powered electrical generating facility and several chemical plants. Pipelines were laid to carry petroleum products to and from the port facilities and other regions. Buckeye Pipeline has the largest pipeline distribution system in Oregon.

As industrialization continued, commercial and residential growth followed. Generally, urban growth continued eastward from Interstate 280 - one of the nation's first Interstates. Recently, residential growth has also occurred south of Maumee Bay in the waterfront areas and with perimeter development in the more rural areas.

In 1954 Oregon Township trustees sought to zone the area. At about the same time, City of Toledo officials sought to annex the northwest industrial area of Oregon Township. The annexation failed, and in 1957 there was an election for Oregon to become an incorporated city. The vote was 3,660 in favor and 2,925 opposed. A key issue in incorporation was to have Oregon own and operate a water and a wastewater plant.

The City of Oregon adopted their Charter in 1958. The new city adopted a slogan of "City of Opportunity." In the mid-1980s, the city added Oregon on the Bay to the City of Opportunity. In 1959 voters approved an "earnings tax" now known as the municipal income tax. The water plant was constructed in 1964 and currently over 90% of the land in Oregon is serviced with waterlines. Plans for an estimated $17.9 million in improvements to the water plant continued in 1998. The original water plant was paid for by a combination of local and federal funds. The city also has a wastewater treatment plant, constructed in 1977, with local and federal funds, which can process up to eight million gallons per day. In 1997 a major upgrade to the wastewater plant was completed. Approximately one-third of the land in the city is serviced by sanitary sewer lines. The city's water and wastewater operations also service portions of Jerusalem Township, northern Wood County and northwest Ottawa County.

The first Marco's Pizza was established in Oregon in 1978.

== Geography ==
The city has a total area of 38.04 square miles (98.52 km^{2}), of which 29.98 square miles (77.65 km^{2}) is land and 8.06 square miles (20.88 km^{2}) is water.

== Demographics ==
Historical population
Census	Pop.	Note	%±
1960	13,319		—
1970	16,563		24.4%
1980	18,682		12.8%
1990	18,334		−1.9%
2000	19,355		5.6%
2010	20,291		4.8%
2020	19,950		−1.7%
2025 (est.)	19,674		−1.4%

=== 2020 census ===
As of the 2020 census, Oregon had a population of 19,950. The median age was 44.9 years; 20.2% of residents were under the age of 18 and 22.0% were 65 years of age or older. For every 100 females there were 94.3 males, and for every 100 females age 18 and over there were 92.2 males age 18 and over.

85.4% of residents lived in urban areas, while 14.6% lived in rural areas.

There were 8,436 households in Oregon, of which 25.9% had children under the age of 18 living in them. Of all households, 46.0% were married-couple households, 18.6% were households with a male householder and no spouse or partner present, and 28.2% were households with a female householder and no spouse or partner present. About 31.8% of all households were made up of individuals and 16.3% had someone living alone who was 65 years of age or older.

There were 8,981 housing units, of which 6.1% were vacant. The homeowner vacancy rate was 1.2% and the rental vacancy rate was 9.3%.

Racial composition as of the 2020 census
Race	Number	Percent
White	17,363	87.0%
Black or African American	416	2.1%
American Indian and Alaska Native	65	0.3%
Asian	154	0.8%
Native Hawaiian and Other Pacific Islander	10	0.1%
Some other race	463	2.3%
Two or more races	1,479	7.4%
Hispanic or Latino (of any race)	1,753	8.8%

=== 2010 census ===
As of the census of 2010, there were 20,291 people, 8,196 households, and 5,555 families residing in the city. The population density was 676.8 inhabitants per square mile (261.3/km^{2}). There were 8,759 housing units at an average density of 292.2 per square mile (112.8/km^{2}). The racial makeup of the city was 93.5% White, 1.4% African American, 0.2% Native American, 0.8% Asian, 2.2% from other races, and 1.9% from two or more races. Hispanic or Latino of any race were 7.5% of the population.

There were 8,196 households, of which 30.7% had children under the age of 18 living with them, 51.6% were married couples living together, 11.8% had a female householder with no husband present, 4.3% had a male householder with no wife present, and 32.2% were non-families. 27.8% of all households were made up of individuals, and 13% had someone living alone who was 65 years of age or older. The average household size was 2.44 and the average family size was 2.97.

The median age in the city was 42.3 years. 22.6% of residents were under the age of 18; 8.1% were between the ages of 18 and 24; 22.7% were from 25 to 44; 28.9% were from 45 to 64; and 17.6% were 65 years of age or older. The gender makeup of the city was 48.1% male and 51.9% female.

=== 2000 census ===
As of the census of 2000, there were 19,355 people, 7,708 households, and 5,318 families residing in the city. The population density was 658.8 inhabitants per square mile (254.4/km^{2}). There were 8,025 housing units at an average density of 273.2 per square mile (105.5/km^{2}). The racial makeup of the city was 94.91% White, 1.00% African American, 0.14% Native American, 0.70% Asian, 0.01% Pacific Islander, 1.72% from other races, and 1.52% from two or more races. Hispanic or Latino of any race were 4.76% of the population.

There were 7,708 households, out of which 30.5% had children under the age of 18 living with them, 55.4% were married couples living together, 9.9% had a female householder with no husband present, and 31.0% were non-families. 27.0% of all households were made up of individuals, and 13.3% had someone living alone who was 65 years of age or older. The average household size was 2.47 and the average family size was 3.00.

In the city the population was spread out, with 24.1% under the age of 18, 7.7% from 18 to 24, 26.9% from 25 to 44, 24.8% from 45 to 64, and 16.5% who were 65 years of age or older. The median age was 40 years. For every 100 females, there were 91.9 males. For every 100 females age 18 and over, there were 87.7 males.

The median income for a household in the city was $45,777, and the median income for a family was $57,156. Males had a median income of $42,631 versus $28,897 for females. The per capita income for the city was $21,619. About 3.4% of families and 4.8% of the population were below the poverty line, including 4.6% of those under age 18 and 5.3% of those age 65 or over.

== Attractions ==
Perhaps the most well-known attraction in Oregon is the Sundance Drive-In, one of the last in the region. Pearson Metropark, within the city limits, and Maumee Bay State Park, have preserved or re-created sections of the original Black Swamp topography and forest. The state park also offers a waterfront resort off Lake Erie, and features a links golf course that has held numerous U.S. Open local qualifiers. Its location at the confluence of major migration routes brings birdwatchers and hunters to nearby shoreland areas. Boating and fishing on Lake Erie are popular pursuits. The city sponsors an extensive softball and baseball recreation program. The annual ethnic German American festival draws over 30,000 people each year.

== Education ==
Oregon Public Schools are part of the Oregon City School District. There are three elementary schools, one intermediate school, one junior high school, and one high school in the district. Clay High School offers students career and technology education which leads students into a better career paths and immediate employment after high school.

Founded in 1960, Cardinal Stritch Catholic High School and Academy, a member of the Roman Catholic Diocese of Toledo, also resides within the city limits. The school's namesake, Cardinal Samuel Stritch, was Toledo's second Bishop, serving from 1921 to 1930.

Oregon's public library is located on Dustin Road, a branch of the Toledo-Lucas County Public Library.
