= Maumee Bay State Park =

Park in Ohio, USA

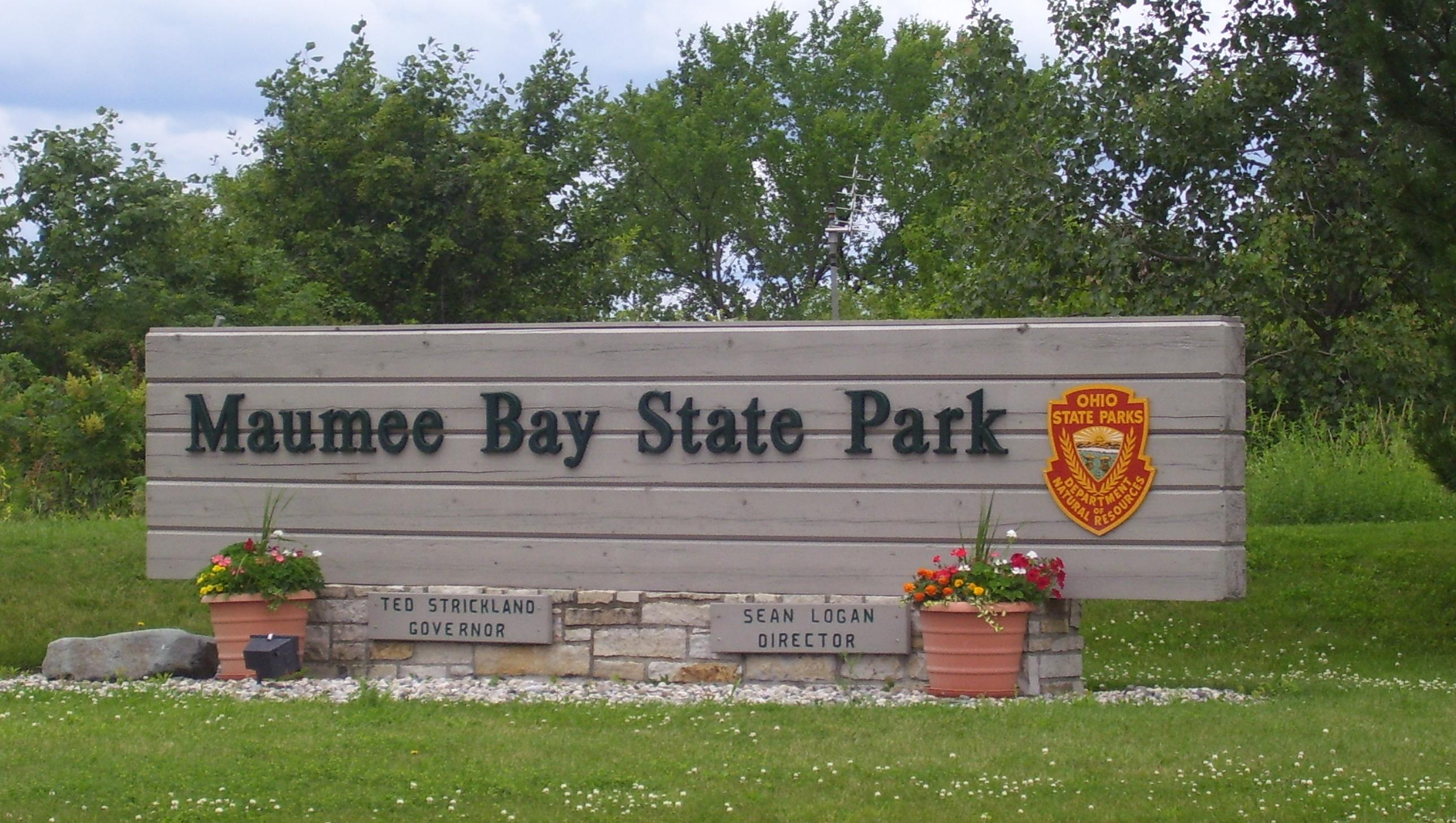

- Location within Ohio Location within the United States
- Location: Lucas County, Ohio, United States
- Coordinates: 41°41′02″N 83°22′45″W
- Area: 1,336 acres (541 ha)
- Elevation: 577 feet (176 m)
- Established: 1975
- Administrator: Ohio Department of Natural Resources
- Designation: Ohio state park
- Website: Maumee Bay State Park

Maumee Bay State Park is a 1,336-acre (541 ha) public recreation area located on the shores of Lake Erie, five miles east of Toledo, in Jerusalem Township, Lucas County, Ohio, United States. Major features of the state park include a lodge and conference center, cottages, camping facilities, golf course, nature center, and two-mile-long interpretive boardwalk. Common activities include hiking, picnicking, fishing, hunting, boating, swimming, winter sports, and geocaching. The site was acquired by the state in 1974 and became a state park in 1975.

== Gallery ==
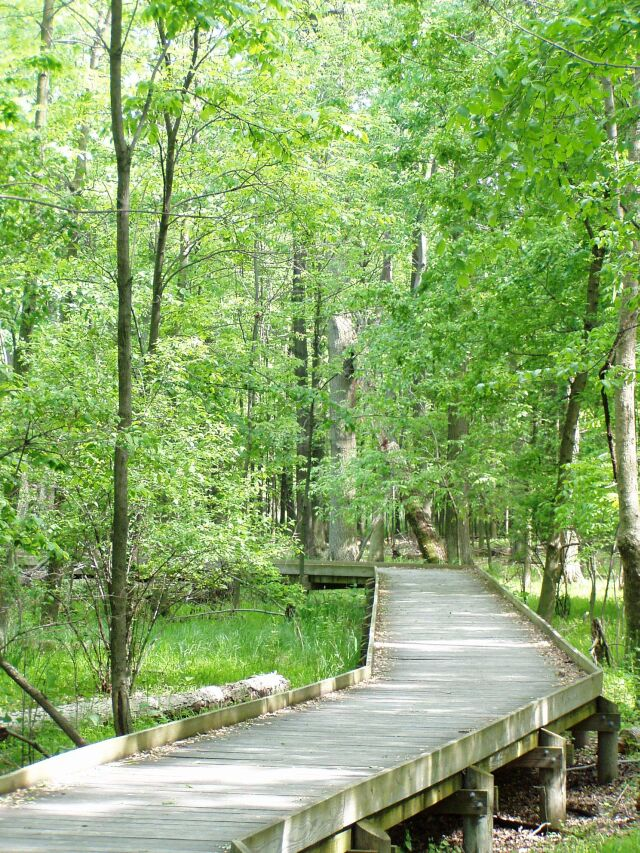
Boardwalk through the wetland forest

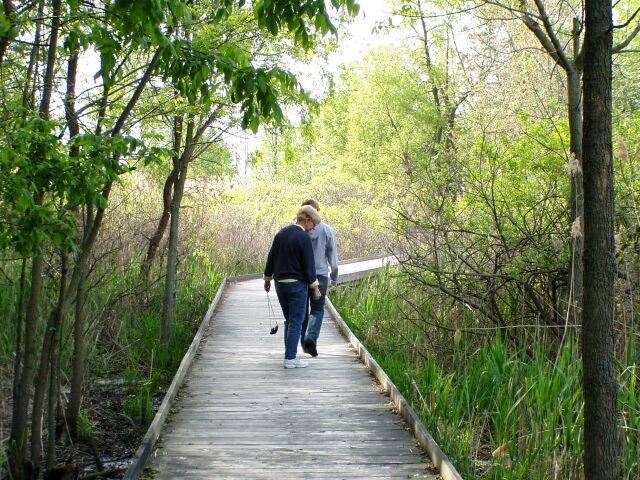
Wetlands boardwalk

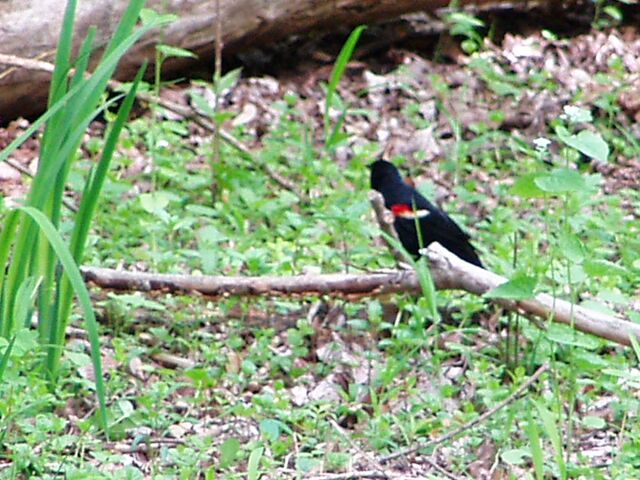
Red-winged blackbird

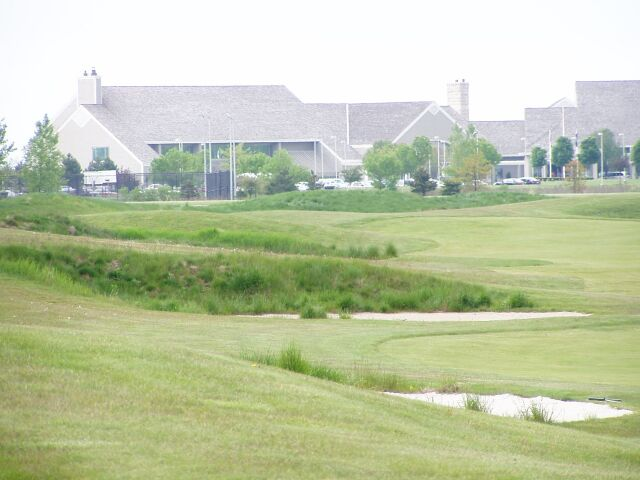
State Park Lodge, golf course in the foreground
