= Northwest Ohio Athletic League =

The Northwest Ohio Athletic League (NWOAL) is a high school sports league in the U.S. state of Ohio. Beginning in 1926, it is the oldest athletic league in the state of Ohio. The league sponsors many sports, including: football, boys & girls cross country, volleyball, boys & girls soccer, wrestling, golf, boys & girls basketball, baseball, softball, and boys & girls track & field. The average school enrollment ranges from 250 to 450 students making it a small to mid-size school league. The NWOAL members have won a total of 26 team state championships.

== Current members ==
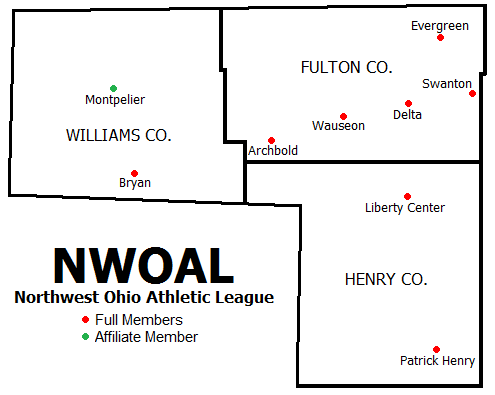
The member schools of the NWOAL.

School	Nickname	Location	Enrollment (CB/FB 2020)	State FB Region (2020)	Colors	Type	Middle school(s)	Tenure
Archbold	Blue Streaks	Archbold	151	6:22	Navy Blue, Gold	Public	Archbold MS	1960-
Bryan	Golden Bears	Bryan	249	4:14	Purple, Gold	Public	Bryan MS	1926-
Delta	Panthers	Delta	138	6:22	Green, White	Public	Delta MS	1926-31, 1957–69, 1978-
Evergreen	Vikings	Metamora	158	6:22	Green, Gold	Public	Evergreen MS	1969-71, 1978-
Liberty Center	Tigers	Liberty Center	142	6:22	Orange, Black	Public	Liberty Center MS	1926-
Patrick Henry	Patriots	Hamler	103	7:26	Red, White, Blue	Public	Patrick Henry MS	1978-
Swanton	Bulldogs	Swanton	174	5:18	Purple, White	Public	Swanton MS	1957-69, 1978-
Wauseon	Indians	Wauseon	236	4:14	Red, White	Public	Wauseon MS	1926-

=== Affiliate member ===
School	Nickname	Location	Colors	Type	Middle school(s)	Tenure	Sport
Montpelier	Locomotives	Montpelier	Navy Blue, Columbia Blue, White	Public	Montpelier JHS	1926-2016 (Full), 2016- (Affiliate)	Wrestling

== Former members ==
School	Nickname	Location	Colors	Type	Membership Tenure	Notes
Defiance	Bulldogs	Defiance	Royal Blue, White	Public	1931-55	Voted out, eventually joined the WBL
Napoleon	Wildcats	Napoleon	Navy Blue, White	Public	1926–78	Left for the GLL, currently in the NLL

== League history ==
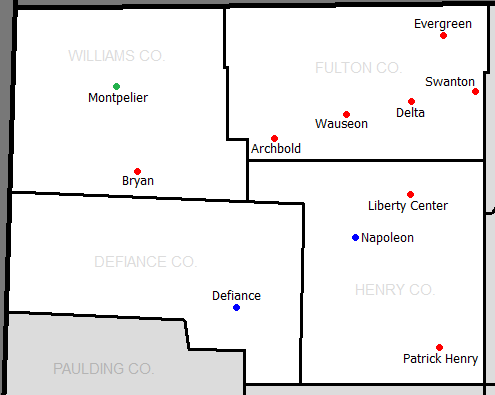
The all-time member schools of the NWOAL. Full members are in red, affiliate members are green, and former members are blue.

=== 1920s ===
- The NWOAL began competition in 1926 with charter members Bryan, Delta, Liberty Center, Montpelier, Napoleon, and Wauseon. The inaugural sports of competition are football, boys basketball, and track.
- A dissatisfied Delta left in 1931 and was replaced by Defiance.

=== 1950s ===
- Baseball and golf are offered as sports for league competition in the 1953–54 school year.
- Defiance was voted out of the league in 1954 for having an enrollment over twice the average of the smaller schools and for being dominant in league titles. They left at the end of the 1954–55 school year.
- Fairview and Paulding apply and are denied league membership in the 50s.
- Swanton and Delta are invited to join and enter the NWOAL in 1957 after a tenure in the Maumee Valley League, this was Delta's second entry into the league.
- Archbold is also invited at the same time and joins in 1960.
- Wrestling becomes a league sport for the 1959–60 school year.
- Ottawa Hills was considered for membership in 1959, but they never officially joined the NWOAL. It was around this time that it became obvious that the smaller schools were not satisfied with the dominance Napoleon (and to a lesser extent, Bryan) were displaying in acquiring all-sports crowns.

=== 1960s ===
- In spring 1968, Defiance re-applied and was denied admission for NWOAL membership, making it evident schools of that size were not welcome in the league. Talk began of Bryan, Defiance, and Napoleon joining up in another league separate from the NWOAL.
- In 1969, the Northern Border League was formed by the smaller members of the NWOAL as a way for them to compete for league titles. Delta and Swanton withdrew from the NWOAL completely while Archbold, Liberty Center, Montpelier, Wauseon and the recently joined Evergreen become dual members of both the NBL and the now 7-member NWOAL. Patrick Henry would also compete in the NBL after consolidating for the 1969–70 school year, although their football team wouldn't begin NBL play until 1970. Competition between the five dual-league members counted in the standings for both the NWOAL and the NBL.
- Cross country becomes a league sport in the 1969–70 school year.

=== 1970s ===
- Consolidated in 1969, Patrick Henry's football team joined the NBL in 1970.
- In 1971, Evergreen left the NWOAL to solely compete in the NBL.
- In the spring of 1972, the NWOAL began their first league championship season for a girls sport with track & field.
- Volleyball became a league sport in 1973.
- In February 1973, more tensions arose when Liberty Center considered leaving the NWOAL completely to compete solely in the NBL. Napoleon also displayed intention of leaving the league they felt they were not wanted in, and it was widely believed that Archbold, Montpelier, and Wauseon would follow Liberty Center's suit. This would have caused Bryan and Napoleon to be left without a league home. Community support kept Liberty Center in the NWOAL, and the league sat on shaky ground for a few more years.
- Girls basketball started up with the 1975–76 season.
- In the spring of 1978, Napoleon finally left the NWOAL and sought competition from larger schools in the Great Lakes League. Upon Napoleon's departure, the NBL folded and was absorbed by the NWOAL in the fall of 1978. Patrick Henry joined for the first time while Delta, Evergreen, and Swanton returned again.

=== 1980s ===
- Girls cross country begins in 1981.
- Softball became a league sport in the spring of 1987.

=== 2010s ===
- For the 2011–12 school year, girls soccer and bowling for both boys and girls begin as league sports.
- Prior to the 2013–14 school year, the NWOAL made an alteration to the league constitution in order to make football scheduling easier on member schools. The first option allows a 10th school to join the league without becoming a full member of the league, while the second option allows a current member to leave the NWOAL to play football in another league or as an independent.
- In May 2014, the Toledo Area Athletic Conference approved adding Montpelier to its league for football only beginning with the 2016 season. In early June 2014, Montpelier's school board voted to remain in the NWOAL for 2014–15, compete as a football independent in the 2015 season, and then for the 2016–17 school year, they joined the TAAC for football only, became a full-member of the Buckeye Border Conference, and remained an NWOAL affiliate for wrestling only.

== League facts ==
- In 2017, the NWOAL crowned its first female league champion in wrestling as McKayla Campbell of Wauseon won the league championship for the 134 pound weight class at the league wrestling meet.
- For the first time in league history, two teams qualified for the OHSAA boys state basketball Final Four in the same season in 2017, as both Archbold and Wauseon made the state Final Four in divisions 2 and 3 respectively.
- Archbold's softball team set an OHSAA record by becoming the first team to win 12 consecutive league championships in softball after winning the title in the 2017 season. That streak ended in 2018, as Wauseon won the NWOAL softball title outright, marking the first time since 2005 that Archbold did not win a softball title.

== League championships ==
=== Boys team champions ===
School Year	Football	Soccer	Cross Country	Golf	Basketball	Wrestling	Bowling	Baseball	Track & Field
1926-27	Napoleon	began 2013	began 1969	began1954	Napoleon	began 1959-60	began 2011-12	began 1954	Montpelier
1927-28	Napoleon				Napoleon				Napoleon
1928-29	Montpelier				Wauseon				Napoleon
1929-30	Napoleon				Bryan				Bryan
1930-31	Bryan				Bryan, Montpelier				Bryan
1931-32	Defiance				Napoleon				Bryan
1932-33	Defiance				Wauseon				Wauseon
1933-34	Defiance				Defiance				Bryan
1934-35	Defiance				Defiance				Bryan
1935-36	Bryan				Defiance				Bryan
1936-37	Bryan				Defiance				Bryan
1937-38	Liberty Center				Liberty Center, Napoleon				Bryan
1938-39	Defiance				Bryan				Bryan
1939-40	Bryan				Defiance				Bryan, Montpelier
1940-41	Bryan				Bryan, Defiance, Wauseon				Bryan
1941-42	Bryan, Defiance, Napoleon				Defiance				Bryan
1942-43	Defiance				Defiance				Montpelier
1943-44	Defiance				Wauseon				Montpelier
1944-45	Wauseon				Wauseon				Wauseon
1945-46	Defiance, Montpelier				Defiance				Bryan
1946-47	Defiance, Montpelier				Bryan				Defiance
1947-48	Napoleon				Napoleon				Defiance
1948-49	Defiance				Defiance, Liberty Center				Napoleon
1949-50	Napoleon				Defiance				Napoleon
1950-51	Montpelier				Bryan				Montpelier
1951-52	Bryan, Napoleon				Bryan				Napoleon
1952-53	Defiance				Napoleon				Defiance
1953-54	Defiance				Bryan			Defiance	Defiance
1954-55	Wauseon			Defiance	Montpelier			Bryan	Defiance
1955-56	Napoleon			Defiance	Montpelier			Montpelier	Napoleon
1956-57	Bryan, Napoleon			Napoleon	Bryan			Bryan	Bryan
1957-58	Napoleon			Napoleon	Bryan			Bryan	Bryan
1958-59	Napoleon			Napoleon	Bryan			Bryan	Bryan
1959-60	Wauseon			Napoleon	Napoleon	Montpelier		Bryan	Napoleon
1960-61	Napoleon			Bryan	Napoleon	Napoleon		Archbold, Bryan	Montpelier
1961-62	Napoleon			Napoleon	Archbold, Napoleon	Napoleon		Archbold	Napoleon
1962-63	Wauseon			Bryan	Napoleon	Napoleon		Napoleon	Montpelier
1963-64	Napoleon			Bryan	Bryan, Napoleon, Swanton, Wauseon	Napoleon		Bryan	Napoleon
1964-65	Bryan			Bryan	Bryan	Delta		Swanton	Bryan
1965-66	Liberty Center, Napoleon			Napoleon	Archbold	Napoleon		Swanton	Bryan, Napoleon
1966-67	Napoleon			Napoleon	Archbold	Napoleon		Liberty Center, Napoleon	Napoleon
1967-68	Napoleon			Bryan	Archbold	Napoleon		Archbold	Napoleon
1968-69	Bryan, Wauseon			Napoleon	Archbold, Bryan, Napoleon	Napoleon		Bryan	Napoleon
1969-70	Bryan, Napoleon		Napoleon	Napoleon	Napoleon	Napoleon		Bryan, Napoleon	Montpelier
1970-71	Napoleon		Napoleon	Napoleon	Napoleon	Archbold		Archbold, Napoleon	Napoleon
1971-72	Napoleon		Napoleon	Napoleon	Napoleon	Napoleon		Archbold, Napoleon	Napoleon
1972-73	Napoleon		Liberty Center	Napoleon	Napoleon	Napoleon		Archbold	Wauseon
1973-74	Napoleon		Napoleon	Bryan/Bryan*	Wauseon	Wauseon		Napoleon, Wauseon	Liberty Center
1974-75	Wauseon		Wauseon	Bryan	Wauseon	Liberty Center		Wauseon	Wauseon
1975-76	Napoleon		Liberty Center	Napoleon	Archbold	Napoleon, Wauseon		Archbold	Napoleon
1976-77	Napoleon		Bryan	Bryan	Archbold	Archbold		Archbold	Napoleon
1977-78	Bryan		Bryan	Napoleon	Archbold	Archbold		Napoleon	Wauseon
1978-79	Wauseon		Bryan	Bryan	Swanton	Swanton		Delta	Bryan
1979-80	Wauseon		Bryan	Wauseon	Swanton	Swanton, Wauseon		Delta	Montpelier
1980-81	Archbold		Bryan	Wauseon	Archbold, Swanton	Swanton, Wauseon		Archbold	Bryan, Liberty Center
1981-82	Swanton		Swanton	Bryan	Swanton	Swanton		Archbold	Wauseon
1982-83	Archbold		Swanton	Wauseon	Patrick Henry	Swanton, Wauseon		Swanton	Delta
1983-84	Archbold, Montpelier		Bryan	Bryan	Patrick Henry	Wauseon		Swanton	Wauseon
1984-85	Evergreen		Bryan	Bryan	Archbold	Liberty Center		Archbold	Archbold
1985-86	Archbold, Bryan, Swanton		Bryan	Wauseon	Patrick Henry	Swanton		Delta	Wauseon
1986-87	Bryan		Swanton	Bryan	Archbold	Swanton		Bryan	Swanton
1987-88	Archbold		Swanton	Bryan	Archbold, Swanton	Liberty Center		Bryan	Swanton, Wauseon
1988-89	Archbold		Swanton	Wauseon	Liberty Center	Archbold, Delta		Swanton	Swanton
1989-90	Archbold, Swanton		Swanton	Wauseon	Archbold, Bryan, Delta, Wauseon	Archbold		Bryan, Delta, Swanton	Wauseon
1990-91	Archbold		Swanton	Bryan	Bryan	Swanton		Bryan	Wauseon
1991-92	Swanton		Swanton	Bryan	Patrick Henry, Wauseon	Delta		Bryan	Wauseon
1992-93	Liberty Center		Swanton	Swanton	Wauseon	Delta		Bryan, Wauseon	Wauseon
1993-94	Wauseon		Bryan	Swanton	Wauseon	Delta, Wauseon		Wauseon	Liberty Center
1994-95	Wauseon		Bryan	Bryan	Delta	Archbold		Bryan	Bryan
1995-96	Swanton		Bryan	Bryan	Archbold	Delta		Bryan	Bryan
1996-97	Patrick Henry		Bryan	Bryan	Bryan, Patrick Henry	Delta		Bryan	Liberty Center
1997-98	Patrick Henry		Bryan	Bryan	Evergreen, Patrick Henry	Delta		Bryan	Liberty Center
1998-99	Liberty Center		Bryan	Wauseon	Archbold, Patrick Henry	Delta		Delta	Wauseon
1999-00	Liberty Center, Wauseon		Bryan	Bryan	Wauseon	Liberty Center		Archbold	Wauseon
2000-01	Liberty Center		Archbold	Bryan	Archbold	Archbold		Archbold	Archbold
2001-02	Liberty Center		Bryan	Bryan	Bryan	Delta		Bryan, Delta, Patrick Henry	Archbold
2002-03	Delta, Patrick Henry		Bryan	Wauseon	Archbold	Delta		Patrick Henry	Archbold, Wauseon
2003-04	Patrick Henry		Bryan	Wauseon	Archbold	Archbold, Liberty Center		Archbold, Bryan	Liberty Center
2004-05	Patrick Henry		Wauseon	Bryan	Archbold, Liberty Center	Liberty Center		Archbold, Bryan, Delta	Wauseon
2005-06	Patrick Henry		Delta	Wauseon	Patrick Henry	Liberty Center		Patrick Henry	Delta
2006-07	Delta, Patrick Henry		Bryan	Bryan	Patrick Henry	Archbold		Patrick Henry	Delta
2007-08	Patrick Henry, Wauseon		Delta	Wauseon	Archbold	Delta		Bryan	Delta
2008-09	Patrick Henry		Delta	Bryan	Bryan, Evergreen	Liberty Center		Bryan	Archbold
2009-10	Patrick Henry		Delta	Bryan	Archbold	Wauseon		Bryan	Archbold
2010-11	Archbold		Delta	Bryan	Archbold	Wauseon		Bryan	Archbold
2011-12	Liberty Center		Archbold	Bryan	Archbold	Wauseon	Wauseon	Bryan	Archbold
2012-13	Bryan		Bryan	Wauseon	Archbold, Wauseon	Delta	Liberty Center	Wauseon	Archbold
2013-14	Bryan	Archbold, Bryan	Bryan	Wauseon	Archbold, Bryan	Delta	Wauseon	Wauseon	Archbold
2014-15	Wauseon	Bryan	Liberty Center	Wauseon	Archbold, Swanton, Wauseon	Wauseon	Bryan	Bryan	Wauseon
2015-16	Swanton, Wauseon	Archbold	Wauseon	Archbold	Archbold, Wauseon	Delta	Bryan, Liberty Center	Bryan	Wauseon
2016-17	Patrick Henry	Archbold	Wauseon	Archbold	Wauseon	Wauseon	Bryan	Archbold	Archbold
2017-18	Archbold	Archbold	Liberty Center	Archbold	Wauseon	Wauseon	Bryan	Bryan	Wauseon
2018-19	Patrick Henry	Archbold	Liberty Center	Archbold	Archbold	Wauseon	Bryan	Archbold	Bryan
2019-20					Evergreen				
2020-21					Archbold				
2021-22					Swanton				
2022-23					Wauseon				
2023-24	Liberty Center				Archbold, Liberty Center, Wauseon				
2024-25	Liberty Center				Patrick Henry				

- Note: Bryan won a spring golf title during the 1973–74 school year.

=== Girls team champions ===
School Year	Volleyball	Cross Country	Soccer	Basketball	Bowling	Softball	Track & Field
1971-72	began 1975	began 1981	began 2011	began 1975-76	began 2011-12	began 1987	Napoleon
1972-73							Montpelier
1973-74							Montpelier
1974-75							Montpelier
1975-76	Montpelier			Archbold			Montpelier
1976-77	Archbold			Archbold			Napoleon
1977-78	Archbold			Bryan			Napoleon
1978-79	Montpelier			Bryan			Swanton
1979-80	Montpelier			Bryan			Bryan
1980-81	Archbold			Archbold, Swanton			Archbold
1981-82	Archbold	Delta		Swanton			Delta
1982-83	Archbold	Wauseon		Swanton			Delta
1983-84	Delta	Wauseon		Evergreen			Evergreen
1984-85	Archbold	Wauseon		Archbold, Bryan, Liberty Center, Swanton			Evergreen
1985-86	Archbold	Bryan		Bryan			Evergreen
1986-87	Archbold	Bryan		Delta, Patrick Henry		Archbold, Delta, Wauseon	Swanton
1987-88	Delta	Swanton		Patrick Henry		Archbold	Bryan
1988-89	Wauseon	Swanton		Swanton		Wauseon	Liberty Center
1989-90	Wauseon	Swanton		Patrick Henry		Archbold	Swanton
1990-91	Archbold	Swanton		Swanton		Archbold	Swanton
1991-92	Bryan	Swanton		Bryan		Archbold	Swanton
1992-93	Archbold	Swanton		Bryan		Archbold	Wauseon
1993-94	Wauseon	Patrick Henry		Archbold		Archbold, Delta	Patrick Henry
1994-95	Archbold	Archbold		Archbold		Archbold	Patrick Henry
1995-96	Archbold	Bryan		Archbold, Wauseon		Wauseon	Wauseon
1996-97	Archbold	Wauseon		Wauseon		Archbold, Wauseon	Liberty Center
1997-98	Archbold	Archbold		Wauseon		Wauseon	Liberty Center
1998-99	Archbold	Archbold		Montpelier, Wauseon		Archbold	Liberty Center
1999-00	Montpelier	Archbold		Wauseon		Archbold	Archbold
2000-01	Archbold, Montpelier	Bryan		Liberty Center		Wauseon	Liberty Center
2001-02	Archbold	Wauseon		Patrick Henry		Archbold, Delta	Liberty Center
2002-03	Evergreen	Delta		Archbold		Delta	Archbold
2003-04	Archbold, Evergreen	Swanton		Archbold, Wauseon		Delta	Archbold
2004-05	Liberty Center	Wauseon		Patrick Henry		Delta	Archbold
2005-06	Patrick Henry	Wauseon		Patrick Henry		Archbold	Wauseon
2006-07	Evergreen	Wauseon		Swanton		Archbold	Wauseon
2007-08	Archbold	Wauseon		Wauseon		Archbold, Evergreen	Wauseon
2008-09	Evergreen	Wauseon		Wauseon		Archbold, Delta, Evergreen, Wauseon	Wauseon
2009-10	Archbold	Liberty Center		Wauseon		Archbold	Patrick Henry
2010-11	Evergreen	Liberty Center		Archbold, Evergreen		Archbold	Archbold
2011-12	Archbold	Liberty Center	Archbold	Archbold	Bryan	Archbold	Liberty Center
2012-13	Archbold	Liberty Center	Archbold	Archbold	Bryan	Archbold, Evergreen	Archbold
2013-14	Delta, Evergreen	Wauseon	Archbold	Archbold	Bryan	Archbold	Wauseon
2014-15	Evergreen	Liberty Center	Delta	Delta	Bryan	Archbold	Wauseon
2015-16	Evergreen	Liberty Center	Swanton	Evergreen	Bryan	Archbold	Wauseon
2016-17	Patrick Henry	Liberty Center	Swanton	Archbold	Bryan	Archbold	Archbold
2017-18	Swanton	Archbold	Archbold	Delta	Bryan	Wauseon	Liberty Center
2018-19	Evergreen, Wauseon	Archbold	Liberty Center	Delta	Bryan	Wauseon	Liberty Center

== Northern Border League (1969–1978) ==
=== History ===
For the 1969–70 school year, the Northern Border League was formed by the smaller-enrollment members of the NWOAL as a way to compete for league titles without Napoleon and Bryan. Delta and Swanton withdrew from the NWOAL completely while Archbold, Liberty Center, Montpelier, Wauseon and the recently joined Evergreen become dual members of both the NBL and the now 7-member NWOAL. Patrick Henry would also compete in the NBL after consolidating for the 1969–70 school year, although their football team wouldn't begin NBL play until 1970. Competition between the five dual-league members counted in the standings for both the NWOAL and the NBL.

Evergreen would withdraw from the NWOAL completely in 1971 and compete solely in the NBL. In 1973, Liberty Center also considered dropping their NWOAL membership solely for the NBL, which led to speculation that Archbold, Montpelier, and Wauseon would do the same in order to avoid competing with Napoleon. Evident that schools didn't want to play with Napoleon, the Wildcats started to look at other leagues for membership. When Napoleon joined the Great Lakes League in 1978, the NBL disbanded completely and all 8 schools joined the NWOAL with Bryan.

=== Boys team champions ===
School Year	Football	Cross Country	Golf	Basketball	Wrestling	Baseball	Track & Field
1969-70	Montpelier, Wauseon	Archbold	Swanton	Archbold, Patrick Henry	Archbold	Montpelier, Swanton	Montpelier
1970-71	Archbold	Swanton	Montpelier	Delta	Archbold	Patrick Henry	Montpelier
1971-72	Patrick Henry	Liberty Center	Montpelier	Archbold, Delta	Patrick Henry	Archbold, Patrick Henry, Swanton	Montpelier, Wauseon
1972-73	Archbold	Liberty Center	Montpelier	Patrick Henry	Swanton	Archbold, Evergreen	Wauseon
1973-74	Montpelier	Swanton	Montpelier	Archbold, Delta, Patrick Henry, Wauseon	Delta	Evergreen, Patrick Henry	Swanton
1974-75	Wauseon	Swanton	Wauseon	Wauseon	Swanton	Patrick Henry, Wauseon	Wauseon
1975-76	Delta, Swanton	Liberty Center	Montpelier	Archbold, Delta	Swanton	Archbold, Evergreen	Delta
1976-77	Swanton	Patrick Henry	Wauseon	Patrick Henry	Archbold	Evergreen	Wauseon
1977-78	Patrick Henry	Wauseon	Archbold	Archbold	Swanton	Patrick Henry	Wauseon

=== Girls team champions ===
School Year	Volleyball	Basketball	Track & Field
1974-75	Delta/Montpelier	Montpelier	Montpelier
1975-76	Montpelier	Archbold	Montpelier
1976-77	Archbold	Patrick Henry	Swanton
1977-78	Archbold	Patrick Henry	Swanton

- Note: Delta won the 1974 regular season NBL volleyball championship while Archbold won the combined league tournament with the NWOAL.

== State championships ==
=== Fall sports ===
	Boys Cross Country	Girls Cross Country	Football	Golf	Boys Soccer	Girls Soccer	Girls Tennis	Volleyball
Archbold			1988		2018			1978, 1981, 1998
Bryan	1995							
Delta								
Evergreen								
Liberty Center		2011, 2012, 2013	1997, 2025					
Patrick Henry			2005					
Swanton								
Wauseon			1993					

=== Winter sports ===
	Boys Basketball	Girls Basketball	Boys Bowling	Girls Bowling	Boys Swimming	Girls Swimming	Wrestling
Archbold							
Bryan							
Delta							1989, 1996, 1998, 1999, 2014, 2016
Evergreen							
Liberty Center							
Patrick Henry	1997						
Swanton							
Wauseon		1997					2018

=== Spring sports ===
	Baseball	Softball	Boys Tennis	Boys Track & Field	Girls Track & Field
Archbold	2005	1982, 1984, 1986			
Bryan	1975				
Delta				1934	
Evergreen					
Liberty Center				1998	
Patrick Henry	2008, 2009				
Swanton					
Wauseon	1995				

== See also ==
- Ohio High School Athletic Conferences
