= Murder of Sierah Joughin =

Murder of an American woman

Sierah Joughin
- Born: February 11, 1996; Sylvania, Ohio, US
- Died: July 22, 2016 (aged 20); Delta, Ohio, U.S.
- Cause of death: Asphyxia (homicide)
- Body discovered: Near County Road 7, Delta, Ohio
- Resting place: Amboy Township Cemetery, Fulton Co., Ohio
- Education: Evergreen High School; University of Toledo
- Occupations: Student, intern
- Parent(s): Sheila Vaculik & Tom Joughin

Sierah Catherine Joughin (February 11, 1996 – July 22, 2016) was an American woman who was abducted and murdered in Delta, Ohio. She disappeared on July 19, 2016, and was found dead three days later. Her assailant, James Dean Worley, was convicted and sentenced to death for her murder and over 20 years in prison for kidnapping, assault, and other related charges.

Worley had been previously convicted and imprisoned for the assault and attempted kidnapping of another woman in 1990 under similar circumstances but was released after three years and was not listed in any state or federal offender database at the time of Joughin's murder. Consequently, the killing prompted the creation of Ohio Senate Bill 231 ("Sierah's Law"), a statute that provides for a searchable database of felons living in the state, who are convicted of specific violent offenses. The statute was signed into law in December 2018.

== Sierah Joughin ==
Sierah Catherine Joughin was born in Sylvania, Ohio, on February 11, 1996, to Sheila Vaculik and Tom Joughin and lived in Metamora, Ohio. Nicknamed "Ce" by friends and family, she graduated from Evergreen High School in 2014. At the time of her death, she was enrolled at University of Toledo's Junior College of Business, studying human resource management and interning at her uncle's metal stamping business.

== James Worley ==
James Dean Worley
- Mugshot of Worley taken by the Ohio Department of Rehabilitation and Correction
- Born: April 8, 1959 (age 67); Tacoma, Washington, US
- Education: Evergreen High School
- Status: Incarcerated on death row
- Convictions: Aggravated murder; Abduction; Felonious assault; Gross abuse of a corpse; Tampering with evidence
- Penalty: Death plus 24 years and 3 months imprisonment

James Dean Worley (born April 8, 1959) was born in Tacoma, Washington, to Florence and James Julius Worley. His father was a United States Army officer, and due to his alcoholism and abuse of his wife, divorced his wife when Worley was five years old. After his mother remarried, the family moved back to the Midwest, and Worley graduated from Evergreen High School in Metamora, Ohio, in 1978. He worked various jobs in Toledo, Ohio, as a farmer in Delta, and as a grounds crew member for several county fairs. Regarding his education, Worley attributed his 1.59 GPA to being a frequent user and seller of marijuana from the age of 14.

In July 1990, Worley ambushed a young woman, Robin Gardner, while she was riding her bike in Whitehouse, Ohio. He struck her with his truck, got out of the vehicle, struck her on the head, and placed her in handcuffs. He then held a screwdriver to her throat and stated, "I'll kill you if you don't stop screaming," and attempted to force her into the vehicle. Gardner was able to escape and was picked up by a passing motorist. Worley was ultimately arrested and convicted on abduction charges and sentenced to 4 – 10 years in prison, with the possibility of parole. He served three years in prison for the crime before he was released early by his own petition.

Worley returned to prison in 2000 when he was convicted of cultivating marijuana plants and possessing weapons while on disability, both felonies at that time. He was released two years later, in 2002, again after petitioning for early release. After his second release from prison, he started a small business at his residence and was licensed as a trailer transporter.

== Murder, investigation and arrest ==
Map of Fulton County, Ohio

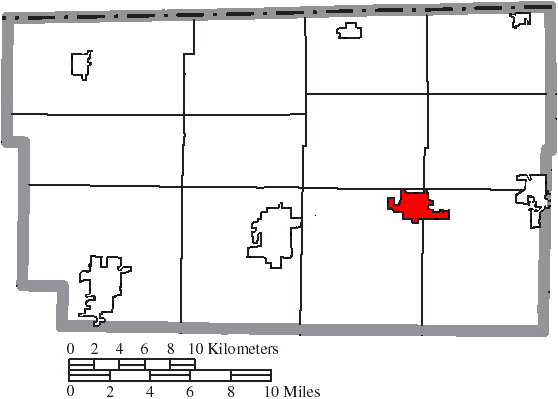
Map of Fulton County, Ohio highlighting the village of Delta

At approximately 6:45 p.m. on July 19, 2016, Joughin was riding her bicycle home from her boyfriend's (Joshua Kolasinski) house while he rode alongside her on his motorcycle. They parted ways near County Road 6 near Metamora, Ohio, in Fulton County, as he turned around to return home, while she continued. When she did not arrive home that evening, and her boyfriend told her family that he couldn't reach her by cell phone, they contacted authorities. Later that evening, Joughin's bicycle was discovered several rows into a cornfield near where she was last seen, and the county sheriff noted signs of a struggle, along with motorcycle tracks through the corn. With the assistance of the FBI, authorities made efforts to track Joughin using her Fitbit activity tracker and smartphone, the latter of which returned a signal several miles from where her bicycle was located, but this did not produce any new leads. Rewards ranging from $25,000 to $100,000 were offered for any information leading to her safe recovery.

Several items that did not belong to Joughin were discovered near her bicycle, including a pair of men's sunglasses, which tested positive for male DNA, a screwdriver, and a box of automotive fuses. A passing driver also recovered a motorcycle helmet with a bloody hand print on its surface. Joughin's boyfriend was not considered a person of interest, as his helmet could quickly be accounted for. When officers were canvassing the neighborhood after Joughin's disappearance, Worley, who lived under 2 miles away, told them his motorcycle had broken down in the area and that he had lost items of the same description as those at the crime scene. He also stated that he had discovered two bicycles in the corn, one of which he took and that it would have his fingerprints on it. He commented that he "didn't steal anything or kill anyone." Another witness in the area described seeing a passenger van driving at a high speed through the area, and provided a license plate number to the authorities. The license plate was soon discovered to be registered to Worley, who had been convicted and sentenced in 1990 for assaulting and attempting to kidnap another woman, who he knocked off her bicycle. Based on this information, investigators obtained a search warrant for Worley's property.

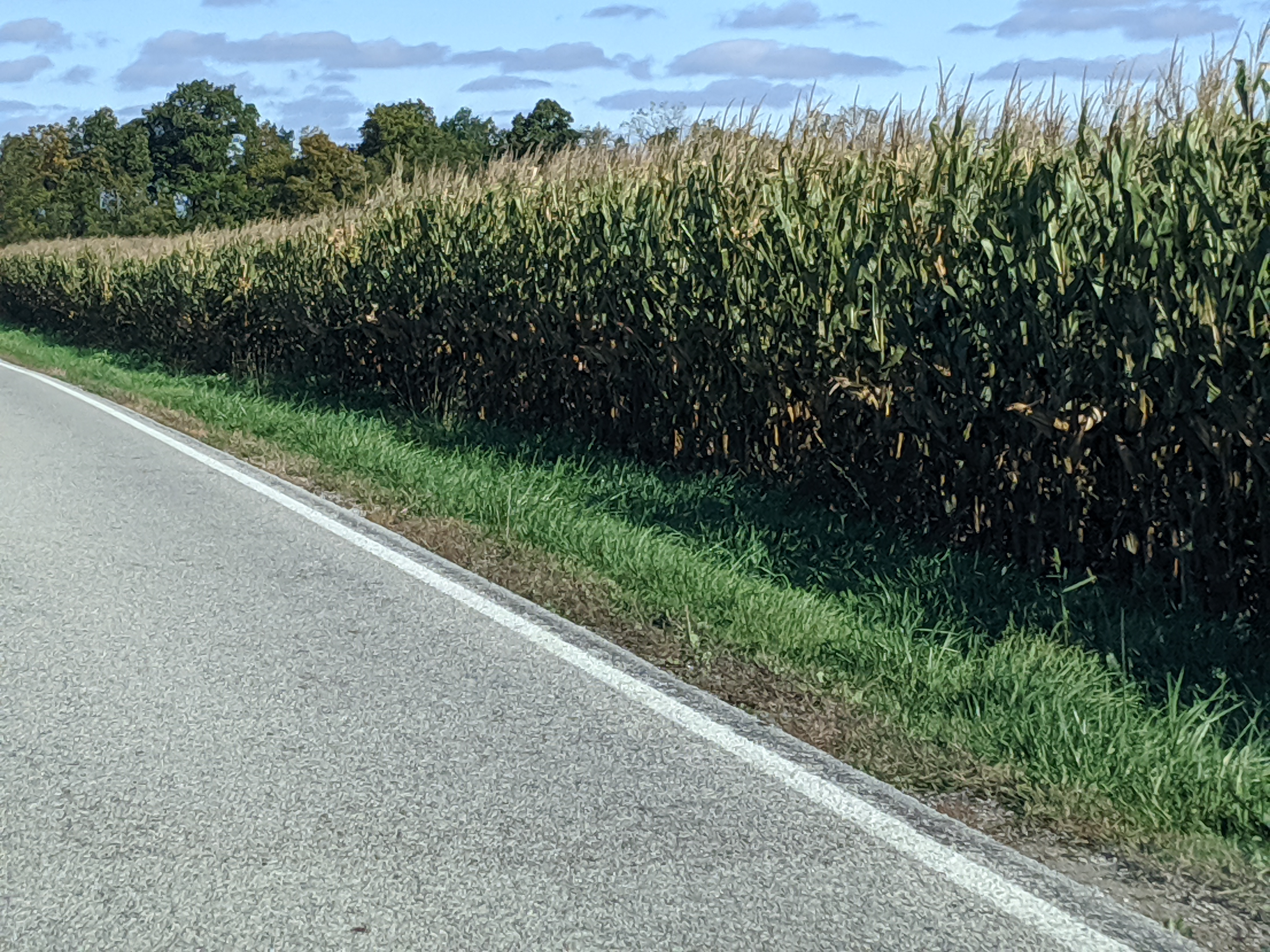
Cornfield along County Road 6, near where Joughin was last seen

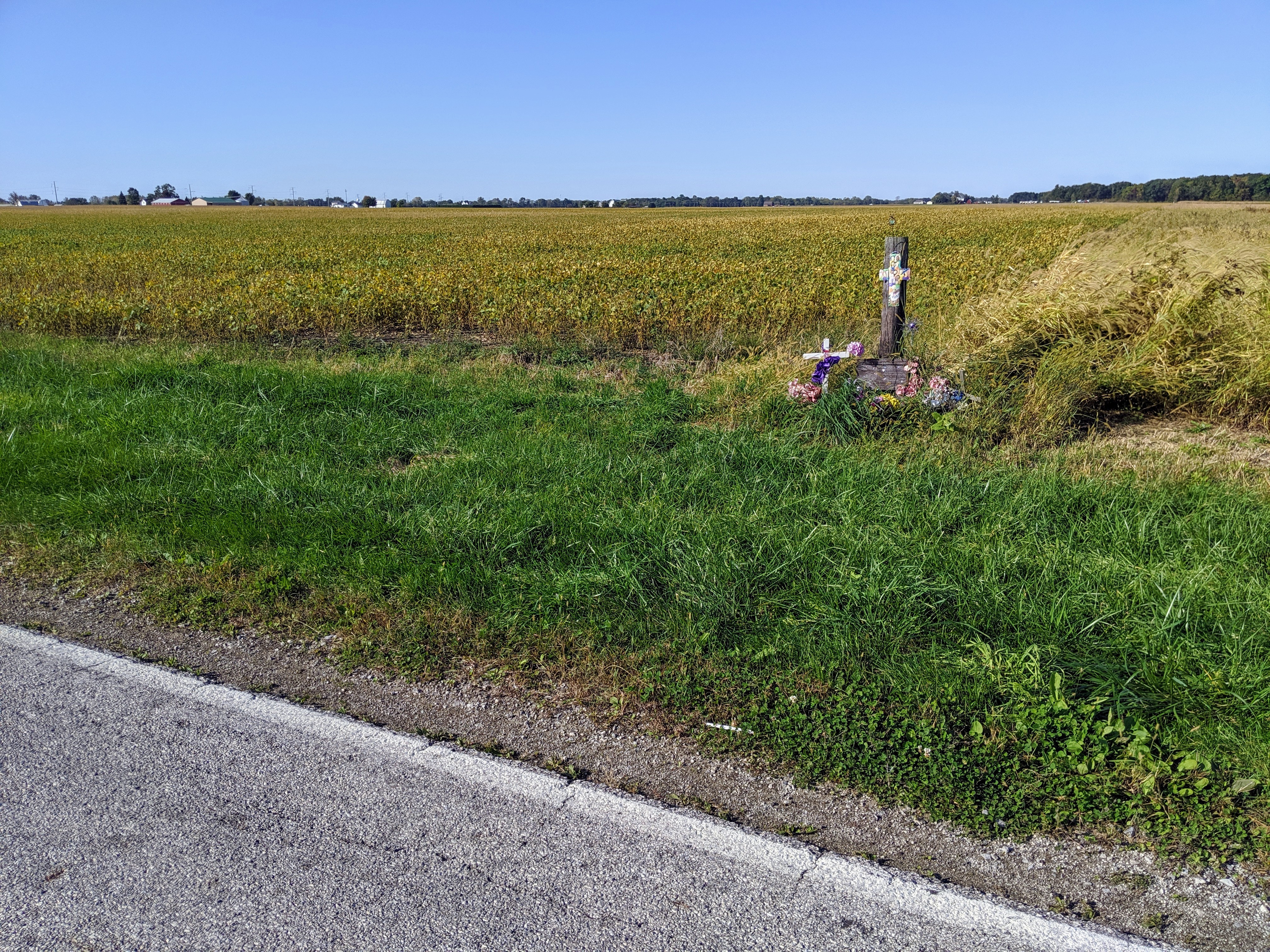
A roadside memorial for Joughin on County Road 7, near where her body was found

Upon searching a barn on Worley's property, authorities discovered a green chest, where they found several pairs of women's underwear (on one of which blood was found), restraints, and a carpet-lined freezer stained with blood. They also found blood on Worley's motorcycle, as well as "zip-tie" restraints and a ski mask in his truck. Joughin's DNA was found on a piece of duct tape and on an inflatable mattress both found in the barn. Investigators found recording devices all over the property and concluded from cell phone records that Worley was at the scene of the abduction for nearly two hours during the time Joughin was missing. They also discovered that Worley had told a court-mandated therapist, after his previous conviction that he "learned from each abduction he had done and the next one he was going to bury." He was arrested on charges of abduction on July 22, three days after Joughin's disappearance. A spokesperson for the sheriff's office suggested that Worley fit the profile of a serial offender and that he could potentially have additional unknown victims, possibly kept at the property. Despite an exhaustive search, neither Joughin nor any human remains were found there.

On the same day Worley was arrested, at around 6:00 p.m., Joughin's remains were discovered in a shallow grave in a field along County Road 7 in Delta, Ohio, a few miles southwest of Worley's property. Her body was found intact, hogtied (wrists handcuffed and bound to the ankles behind the back), had a large plastic toy in her mouth functioning as a gag, and wearing an adult diaper. An autopsy determined the cause of death as asphyxiation, caused by the gag. There was no evidence of sexual assault. The precise time of death was not determined, but the official time of death was 9:00 p.m. on July 22, 2016, when she was declared dead by medical professionals.

== Legal proceedings ==
=== Indictment and arraignment ===
On August 16, 2016, Worley was indicted on nineteen counts and was jailed without bail. The charges included aggravated murder, kidnapping, felonious assault, abduction, tampering with evidence, and abuse of a corpse. At his arraignment he entered a plea of not guilty on all charges. Prosecutors sought capital punishment for the aggravated murder charge. After two delays in September 2017 and January 2018, and hundreds of potential jurors called, trial testimony began in March 2018 at the Fulton County Common Pleas Court in Wauseon, Ohio, with Judge Jeffrey Robinson presiding over the case.

=== Allegations and defense summary ===
The prosecution alleged that Worley had watched pornography up until the crime was committed, as evidenced by his web browsing history. He ambushed Joughin after encountering her on County Road 6, struck her in the head with his motorcycle helmet (possibly knocking her unconscious and leaving DNA evidence on the helmet), and waited in the cornfield until it was dark. During this time, he called his brother to tell him his motorcycle had broken down, but prosecutors alleged he was next to Joughin in the cornfield when he placed the call. He then rode his motorcycle back home (less than five miles away), drove his van back to the crime scene (during which a witness noticed speeding), and transported her back to the barn at his residence. There he left some of her blood-stained clothes and physically assaulted, hog-tied, and gagged her with a plastic toy. At some point, she asphyxiated from the gag, which prosecutors alleged Worley intended, as it was inserted with enough force to break a tooth. Worley then transported her body to the cornfield close to his property, which he buried approximately two feet deep.

Worley denied having ever encountered or assaulted Joughin. His defense argued that the evidence obtained from the barn, including the underwear, handcuffs, and BDSM-related items, were part of a pornography studio that Worley had intended to start. Worley claimed that he had left behind the helmet and other evidence found near Joughin's bicycle before the disappearance took place when his motorcycle had broken down on the side of the road. They alleged that because of the low concentration of Worley's DNA on the helmet, it might have been someone else who used it to assault Joughin. A witness saw a man crouched in a field wearing red shorts, but no red shorts were recovered at Worley's property, and his defense argued it, therefore, could not have been Worley in the cornfield.

=== Witnesses ===
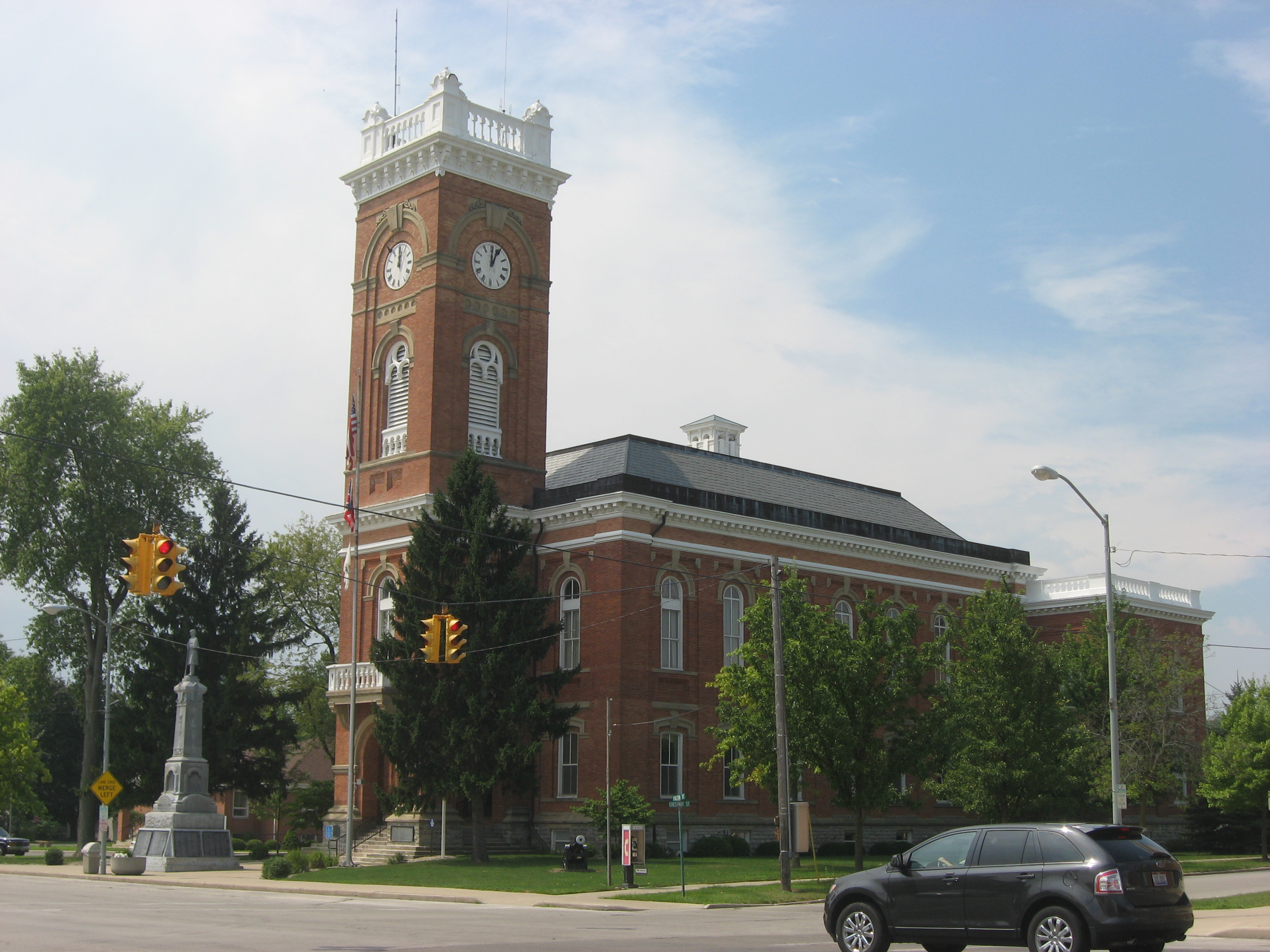
The Fulton County Courthouse in Wauseon, Ohio

During the trial, the prosecution presented several witnesses, among them:

- Megan Roberts, BCI Special Agent, testified about physical evidence recovered at the alleged kidnapping site, Worley's residence, and the location where Joughin's body was found, much of which contained both Worley's and Joughin's DNA
- David Morford, Toledo Police Detective, testified about digital evidence, such as cell phone records showing Worley in the vicinity of the crime scene for over two hours, and evidence on his home computer, including pornography searches for terms such as "hogtyed teen", "rape", "stranded" and "helpless"
- Robin Gardner, previous victim of Worley, testified that in July 1990, Worley ran her down with his truck, held a screwdriver to her neck, and threatened to kill her if she didn't come with him; a crime for which he was sentenced to 4–10 years in prison, but served just three before being released.

Worley's defense team presented several witnesses; two of them were longtime friends of his. The first acknowledged under cross-examination that the helmet found on County Road 6 on the night of Joughin's abduction was the same one he had bought for Worley several years prior. The second witness testified under cross-examination that he and Worley smoked marijuana and watched pornography together. At one time, Worley mentioned he wished to start a pornography studio in his barn, where at the time, he was drying marijuana plants. He also stated that Worley was having electrical problems with his motorcycle, but "it never left him stranded".

=== Verdict and sentencing ===
Closing arguments for the trial concluded on March 26, 2018, and jury deliberations began the same day. Worley was found guilty on March 28, 2018, of seventeen of the original nineteen charges, including aggravated murder, after jurors deliberated for less than six hours.

Jury sentencing guidelines in Ohio required the jury to decide if any outweighing mitigating factors in Worley's case warranted a life sentence or if any outweighing aggravating factors warranted a death sentence. Worley's defense argued for a life sentence, describing him as a "damaged man". Criminal psychologist Dr. John Fabian, a witness for the defense, suggested the attack was motivated by "sexual sadism connected with a fetish disorder". He stated Worley had multiple mental health issues, and had diagnosed him with Sexual Paraphilia Disorder. Worley's defense, during their closing statement, suggested that Worley may have had an unnamed accomplice and had an incestuous relationship with his mother before her death. The prosecution dismissed both claims, stating the gravesite was dug hastily, requiring only one person, and that there was little evidence to support an inappropriate relationship between Worley and his mother.

The prosecution argued that because Worley had an average upbringing and knew the difference between right and wrong, the aggravating factors of his crimes outweighed any disorders he may have. During the second day of testimony in the trial's penalty phase, prosecutors presented audio recordings between Worley's sister and a private investigator. She mentioned that Worley had been suspected of killing a prostitute in 2000 (but was never charged as no remains could be found), as well as another woman in the 1970s that Worley described as "the love of his life," but who was not identified and might have still been alive at the time of the interview.

Prior to sentencing, Worley made a 45-minute statement described by The Blade as "rambling and disjointed", in which he stated he believed someone else kidnapped and murdered Joughin, leaving evidence to frame him. Members of the gallery became upset during the statement and left the courtroom after he described Joughin as a "beautiful girl".

The jury recommended capital punishment, which Judge Robinson upheld on April 16, 2018, stating, "If I thought there was a snowball's chance in hell that you were innocent, you'd be looking at [a] life [sentence]". Additionally, Worley was sentenced to 11 years imprisonment for kidnapping, eight years for felonious assault, 11 months for possessing criminal tools, and 36 months each for tampering with evidence and having weapons under disability.

Since April 19, 2018, Worley has been held on death row at the Ross Correctional Institution as inmate #A743593. His execution date, originally set for June 3, 2019, was delayed in June 2018, and again in August 2018 due to appeals. In July 2020, Worley's attorneys filed a motion with the Ohio Supreme Court to overturn his original conviction and grant him a new trial, citing the government's alleged failure to prove several aspects of the charges, Worley's mental illnesses, incompetent counsel, and several alleged violations of jury and evidentiary rules. They argued that the jury in the 2016 trial was "tainted" due to the close-knit nature of the community — that potential jurors were familiar with Worley, the Joughin family, or the case itself — which made a fair trial impossible. The appeal was denied by the court, and an execution date of May 20, 2025, was set for Worley.

The day Worley was supposed to be executed, however, his execution was stayed amid pending motions filed by the defense. The case is currently under review and, to date, no new date of execution has been scheduled.

== Aftermath ==
The funeral for Joughin was held on July 28, 2016, at Christ the Word Church in Sylvania, Ohio, and her remains were interred in Amboy Township Cemetery, near Metamora, Ohio.

=== Community events ===
Following the arrest of Worley, community residents organized a "Take Back the Roads" memorial walk in honor of Joughin, taking place along the road where her bicycle was found.

On September 18, 2016, a Sierah Joughin Memorial Motorcycle Ride was organized and hosted by the nonprofit Keeping Our Girls Safe, which was created in memory of Sierah by her mother Sheila Vaculik and the (Josh) Kolasinski Family. Over 700 people mounted for the ride to support the mission and raise funds of the non-profit.

On October 2, 2016, Evergreen School District hosted a "Joggin' 4 Joughin" 5K run to raise money for a scholarship fund and to ask for support for a violent-offender registry bill being constructed by Ohio legislators. Event officials expected to attract around 300 participants but were forced to limit the number to 1600 when a large crowd of supporters and participants arrived.

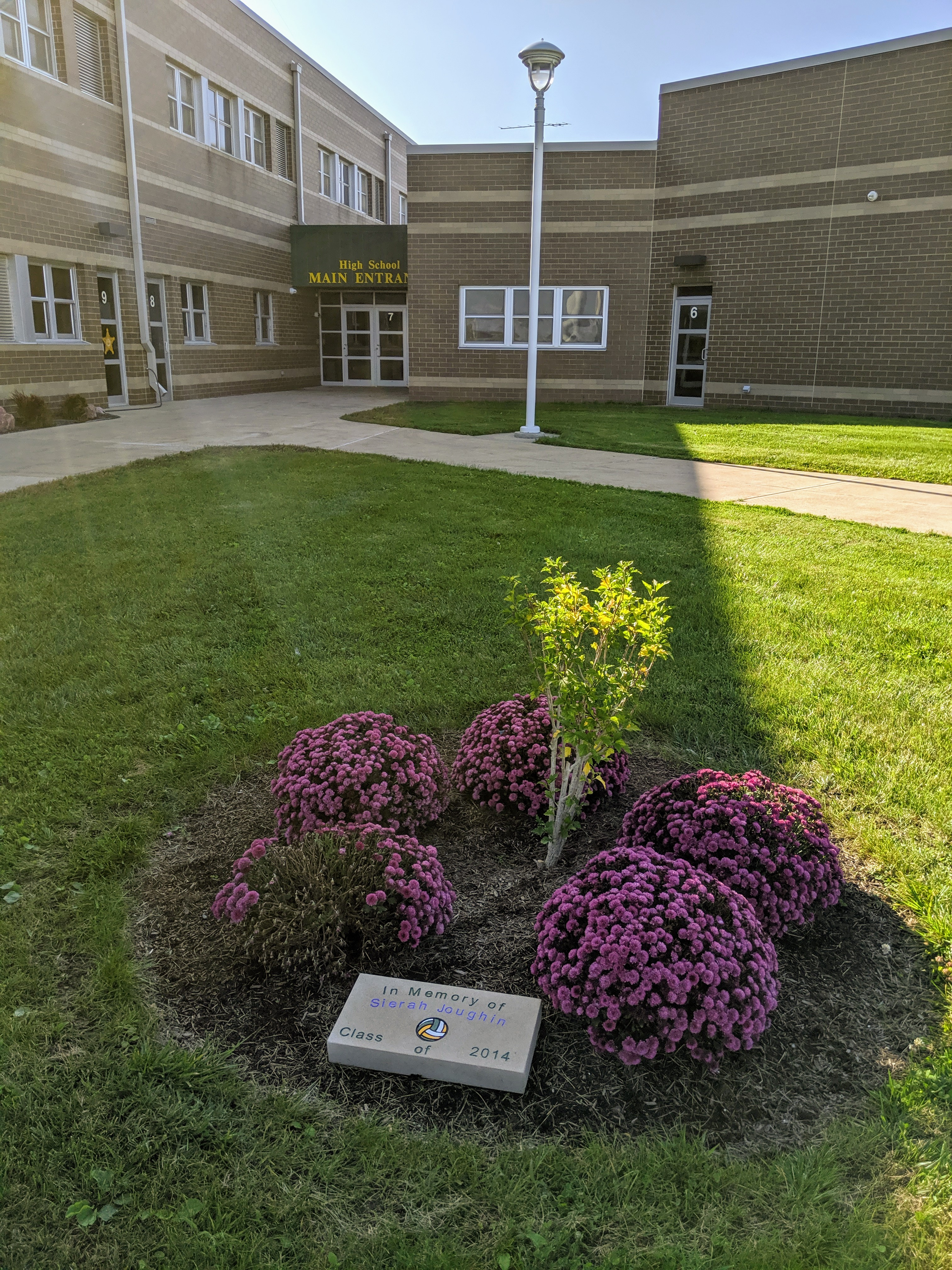
The memorial plaque and tree for Joughin at Evergreen High School, donated by Keeping Our Girls Safe and dedicated in 2019

=== Sierah Joughin Memorial Scholarship Fund ===
During the disappearance and search, Joughin's family created a GoFundMe page to request funds to aid in the search effort. After her body was discovered, the family established the Sierah Joughin Memorial Scholarship Fund from the donations, in addition to the funds raised by the school district's 5K run event, to be administered by the Toledo Community Foundation. The scholarship benefits graduates from Evergreen High School (where Joughin graduated) who have participated in a varsity sport and organization. In September 2019, the high school dedicated a plaque and planted two trees on the property honoring Joughin.

=== Worley property ===
In July 2018, Worley's Delta, Ohio, property was awarded to Joughin's estate, and her family had the main barn demolished. A monetary settlement of $3.6 million was also reached, but Joughin's family agreed not to execute on the judgment unless "the defendant(s) receives a windfall sum of money such as winning the lottery, or receiving book or movie rights or royalties..."

In August 2020, the Fulton County Sheriff's Department searched the Worley property again, using excavation equipment, with assistance from the FBI. A statement by the sheriff read that the investigation into Worley was ongoing, that any evidence found would be collected with assistance from the FBI Evidence Response Team, and then gave no further comment. Joughin's family stated that the search was not related to her case.

=== Sierah's Law ===
After the murder and trial, Joughin's family and other activists argued that not enough information was available to law enforcement and residents regarding convicted felons residing in their communities. If a system had been in place to warn the public of offenders in their area, her murder might have been prevented. Law enforcement had stated to the family during the investigation that Worley was not on any local, state or federal database that tracks offenders, and the family argued that such a database being available might have resulted in Joughin being rescued alive. In July 2016, the organization 'Standing Courageous' started a Change.org petition, calling for lawmakers to establish a "violent offender registry" in Ohio, gathering over 13,000 signatures. Talks among legislators began regarding the creation of a database of violent offenders convicted of specific crimes such as murder, kidnapping and abduction.

Initially introduced as Senate Bill 67, "Sierah's Law" was constructed in February 2017 by Senators Randy Gardner and Cliff Hite and presented to the Ohio Senate Judiciary Committee. Originally, the bill was intended to allow the public to search on a website for offenders with the qualifying convictions, similar to a sex offender registry. After several hearings, where some opponents such as the ACLU argued that the bill did nothing to protect the public and created privacy concerns, the bill was changed so that residents must visit their local sheriff's office to request a search be performed.

In November 2017, "Sierah's Law" was introduced to the Ohio Senate as Senate Bill 231. Joughin's mother spoke before legislators in November 2018, urging them to pass the bill. It was passed on December 6, 2018, and signed into law by Governor John Kasich on December 19. It went into effect on March 20, 2019.

=== Charitable organizations ===
Two separate non-profit charitable organizations were established to honor Joughin. Keeping Our Girls Safe was created within a month of Sierah's death by her mother, Sheila Vaculik, and the Kolasinski Family. Keeping Our Girls Safe provides advocacy against violence towards women by offering educational programs to the community through partnerships with local police departments. The trauma informed curriculum for the women's self-defense classes has been copyrighted. As of July, 2025, over 3500 women have received personal safety education through this program.

Justice For Sierah was established after the trial by Joughin's mother and aunt, which provides self-defense training courses for schools and communities, and educates the public on community safety topics and Sierah's Law. The organization holds an annual "Spirit of Sierah" 5K race in Sylvania, Ohio.

== In media ==
In May 2022, local CBS affiliate station WTOL published a report and excerpts of an exclusive interview between Worley and anchor Melissa Andrews. Worley had written Andrews several letters earlier that year and sent a 105-page manifesto claiming his innocence in Joughin's murder. The manifesto itself was not published. In the manifesto, Worley indirectly references a 1996 case of a missing woman named Claudia "Sissy" Tinsley. Andrews concluded that Worley was the last person that Tinsley saw alive and implicated him in her disappearance, but Worley denied any involvement.

The Joughin murder investigation and trial have appeared in several television series and podcasts:

- Buried In the Backyard (Season 2, Episode 10; "Deep In The Cornfields") on Oxygen
- "Sierah Joughin" Generation Why podcast, September 15, 2019
- Living a Nightmare (Season 1, Episode 1; "The Long Way Home") on Investigation Discovery
- "Murdered: Sierah Joughin" Crime Junkie podcast, April 19, 2021
- Homicide Hunter: American Detective (Season 5, Episode 3; "Barn of Horrors") on Investigation Discovery
- "The Evil That Followed" That Chapter podcast, April 5, 2023
- 20/20 (Season 46, Episode 5; "She Was Almost Home") on ABC
- ”The Long Ride Home: The Awful Case of Sierah Joughin”, Truly Criminal YouTube channel, February 17, 2024
- "The Scariest Barn on Earth" Small Town Murder podcast, July 19, 2024
- "Abducted While Biking Home: The Murder of 20-Year-Old Sierah Joughin" "True Crime With Kendall Rae" podcast, January 16, 2025
- "Killing was Purposeful, Part 3, True Crime Garage Podcast, May 20, 2025

== See also ==
- List of death row inmates in the United States
- List of people scheduled to be executed in the United States
- List of solved missing person cases (post-2000)
