= List of Bowling Green Falcons in the NFL draft =

This list of Bowling Green Falcons football players in the NFL draft.

== Key ==
B	Back	K	Kicker	NT	Nose tackle
C	Center	LB	Linebacker	FB	Fullback
DB	Defensive back	P	Punter	HB	Halfback
DE	Defensive end	QB	Quarterback	WR	Wide receiver
DT	Defensive tackle	RB	Running back	G	Guard
E	End	T	Offensive tackle	TE	Tight end

== Selections ==
Year	Round	Pick	Overall	Player	Team	Position
1949	10	6	97	Max Minnich	Los Angeles Rams	B
1950	24	12	312	Jack Woodland	Cleveland Browns	B
1950	29	12	377	Bob Schnelker	Cleveland Browns	E
1953	16	9	190	Fred Durig	San Francisco 49ers	E
1954	20	5	234	Jim Ladd	Chicago Bears	E
1956	9	12	109	Jack Hekcer	Cleveland Browns	E
1957	6	10	71	Ken Russell	Detroit Lions	T
1958	8	7	92	Karl Koepfer	Detroit Lions	G
1958	19	9	226	John Murnen	Baltimore Colts	G
1959	13	10	154	Ray Reese	Cleveland Browns	B
1959	27	10	322	Larry Baker	Cleveland Browns	T
1961	1	9	9	Bernie Casey	San Francisco 49ers	B
1961	11	7	147	Ralph White	Baltimore Colts	T
1961	16	12	222	Clarence Mason	Green Bay Packers	E
1961	19	11	263	Bob Reublin	New York Giants	B
1962	5	5	61	Jerry Croft	Baltimore Colts	G
1962	11	10	150	Karl Anderson	Detroit Lions	T
1962	13	3	171	Bob Fearnside	Los Angeles Rams	RB
1963	2	3	17	Bob Reynolds	St. Louis Cardinals	T
1963	3	8	36	Don Lisbon	San Francisco 49ers	B
1963	19	9	261	Gary Sherman	Cleveland Browns	LB
1964	10	10	136	Tony Lawrence	St. Louis Cardinals	T
1966	2	16	32	Jerry Jones	Atlanta Falcons	T
1966	11	14	169	Tony Fire	Cleveland Browns	T
1966	13	6	191	Heath Wingate	Washington Redskins	C
1967	5	16	123	Jamie Rivers	St. Louis Cardinals	TE
1967	6	25	158	Steward Williams	Green Bay Packers	RB
1967	9	7	218	Mike Weger	Detroit Lions	DB
1967	17	8	427	Dick Wagoner	Minnesota Vikings	DB
1969	13	9	326	Richard Perrin	New York Giants	DB
1970	5	7	111	Tom Lloyd	St. Louis Cardinals	T
1970	8	21	203	Honester Davidson	Cleveland Browns	DB
1970	13	18	330	Dave Polak	Baltimore Colts	LB
1971	2	19	45	Phil Villapiano	Oakland Raiders	LB
1973	3	7	59	Fred Sturt	St. Louis Cardinals	G
1973	16	13	403	John Czerwinski	New York Jets	T
1974	4	6	84	Tony Bell	Baltimore Colts	DB
1974	8	16	198	Paul Miles	Baltimore Colts	RB
1974	10	11	245	Phil Polak	Philadelphia Eagles	RB
1974	12	7	293	Roger Wallace	St. Louis Cardinals	WR
1974	15	22	386	Greg Meczka	San Diego Chargers	TE
1974	16	13	403	Myron Wilson	Detroit Lions	DB
1976	16	4	435	Gene Jones	New Orleans Saints	T
1977	12	26	333	Dave Preston	New England Patriots	RB
1978	3	12	68	Mark Miller	Cleveland Browns	QB
1978	6	13	151	Jack Williams	St. Louis Cardinals	DE
1979	8	14	206	Jeff Groth	Miami Dolphins	WR
1979	12	13	316	Dirk Abernathy	Oakland Raiders	DB
1980	9	24	245	Bob Harris	Philadelphia Eagles	T
1983	12	25	332	Andre Young	Cincinnati Bengals	LB
1984	4	17	101	Martin Bayless	St. Louis Cardinals	DB
1984	12	13	321	Mark Emans	Green Bay Packers	LB
1986	12	8	313	Brian McClure	Buffalo Bills	QB
1989	5	2	114	Kyle Kramer	Cleveland Browns	DB
1990	5	7	116	Reggie Thornton	Minnesota Vikings	WR
1990	6	18	155	Ron Heard	Pittsburgh Steelers	WR
1990	8	17	210	Derrick Carr	New Orleans Saints	DE
1991	10	20	270	Cris Shale	Washington Redskins	P
1995	3	28	92	Charlie Williams	Dallas Cowboys	DB
2004	6	22	187	Josh Harris	Baltimore Ravens	QB
2005	7	28	242	Scott Mruczkowski	San Diego Chargers	C
2006	5	32	164	Omar Jacobs	Pittsburgh Steelers	QB
2008	4	9	108	Kory Lichtensteiger	Denver Broncos	C
2013	6	30	198	Chris Jones	Houston Texans	DT
2019	6	33	208	Scotty Miller	Tampa Bay Buccaneers	WR
2023	6	2	179	Karl Brooks	Green Bay Packers	DT
2025	3	3	67	Harold Fannin Jr.	Cleveland Browns	TE
