= Evergreen High School =

Evergreen High School can refer to one of the following institutions:

- Evergreen High School (Oakhurst, California)
- Evergreen High School (Colorado)
- Evergreen High School (Ohio)
- Evergreen High School (King County, Washington)
- Evergreen High School (Vancouver, Washington)

== See also ==
- Evergreen School (disambiguation)
- Evergreen School District (disambiguation)
