= Evergreen School =

Evergreen School may refer to:

- Evergreen School (Evergreen, Alabama), American school building
- Evergreen School (Jaipur), Indian school in Rajasthan
- Evergreen School (Shoreline), American private school in Washington state

== See also ==
- Evergreen Christian School
- Evergreen High School (disambiguation)
- Evergreen School District (disambiguation)
