= Evergreen School District =

Evergreen School District may refer to:

- Evergreen Elementary School District in San Jose, California
- Evergreen Local School District in Fulton County, Ohio
- Evergreen Public Schools in Clark County, Washington
- Evergreen School District No. 50 in Evergreen, Montana
- Evergreen Park Community High School District 231 in Evergreen Park, Illinois
- Evergreen Park Elementary School District 124 in Evergreen Park, Illinois

== See also ==
- Evergreen School (disambiguation)
- Evergreen High School (disambiguation)
