= Patrick Henry High School (Hamler, Ohio) =

Location
- 6-900 State Route 18; Hamler, (Henry County), Ohio 43524; United States
- Coordinates: 41°13′34″N 83°59′45″W

Information
- Type: Public, Coeducational high school
- Superintendent: Josh Biederstedt
- Principal: Rob Luderman
- Teaching staff: 16.00 (FTE)
- Grades: 9-12
- Student to teacher ratio: 15.88
- Campus: Rural
- Colors: Red, White and Blue
- Athletics conference: NWOAL
- Team name: Patriots
- Athletic Director: Bryan Hieber
- Website: District Website

Patrick Henry High School is a public high school in Hamler, Ohio. It is the only high school in the Patrick Henry Local Schools district. Named for American Founding Father Patrick Henry, their nickname is the Patriots with their colors being Red, White, and Blue. They are members of the Northwest Ohio Athletic League. Patrick Henry consolidated in 1969 and houses students from Hamler, Deshler and Malinta, Ohio.

== Academics ==
The Ohio Department of Education ranked the district as Excellent from 2002 to 2012, and it has also been included in a national "Top 100 High Schools That Work" grouping.

== Activities ==
Students can participate in the school's pep band, spring musical, yearbook, student council, National Honor Society, quiz team, Fellowship of Christian Athletes, and clubs for art, Spanish, science, math, the Renaissance, robotics, books, and poetry.

The school fields sports teams in football, baseball, boys' and girls' basketball, boys' and girls' track, volleyball, cheerleading, boys' and girls' cross country, gymnastics, wrestling, golf, softball, bowling, and archery.

=== Ohio High School Athletic Association State Championships ===
- Boys Baseball - 2008, 2009
- Boys Football – 2005
- Boys Basketball – 1997

=== NWOAL championships (1978-) ===
- Football: 1996, 1997, 2002*, 2003, 2004, 2005, 2006*, 2007*, 2008, 2009, 2016, 2018
- Volleyball: 2005, 2016, 2025
- Girls Cross Country: 1993, 2024
- Boys Basketball: 1982-83, 1983–84, 1985–86, 1991-92*, 1996-97*, 1997-98*, 1998-99*, 2005–06, 2006–07, 2024–25
- Girls Basketball: 1986-87*, 1987–88, 1989–90, 2001–02, 2002–03, 2004–05, 2005–06, 2024-25
- Baseball: 2002*, 2003, 2006, 2007, 2023
- Girls Track & Field: 1994, 1995, 2010

=== Northern Border League championships (1969-1978) ===
- Football: 1971, 1977
- Boys Cross Country: 1976
- Boys Basketball: 1972-73, 1973-74*, 1976–77
- Wrestling: 1971-72
- Girls Basketball: 1976-77, 1977–78
- Baseball: 1971, 1972*, 1974*, 1975*, 1978

Note: shared league titles are denoted with an asterisk (*)

== Alumni ==
- Marc Krauss, outfielder, 1st baseman
- Jim Hoops, Ohio State Representative
- Eric Schwab, 4 time NWC softball Coach of the Year, Defiance College baseball all time walks leader, 1x Lambert Days Champion, 5x Church Softball Champion, 2024 OHSAA Official of the Year, Tik Tok Influencer
