= Liberty Center High School =

Location
- 100 Tiger Trail; Liberty Center, (Henry County), Ohio 43532; United States; 41°26′30″N 84°0′38″W

Information
- Type: Public, Coeducational high school
- Superintendent: Richard Peters
- Principal: Greg Radwan
- Teaching staff: 28.00 (FTE)
- Grades: 9-12
- Student to teacher ratio: 11.04
- Colors: Orange and Black
- Athletics conference: NWOAL
- Sports: Marching Band, Baseball, Boys' & Girls' Basketball, Bowling, Boys' & Girls' Cross Country, Football, Cheerleading, Golf, Gymnastics, Boys' & Girls' Soccer, Softball, Boys' & Girls' Track and Field, Volleyball, and Wrestling
- Team name: Tigers
- Rival: Patrick Henry (Patriots) and Napoleon (Wildcats)
- Yearbook: Tigeron
- Athletic Director: Kaleb Pohlman
- Website: www.libertycenterschools.org

Liberty Center High School is a public high school in Liberty Center, Ohio. It is the only high school in the Liberty Center Local Schools district. Their school mascot nickname is the Tigers, with their colors being orange and black. They are members of the Northwest Ohio Athletic League.

== History ==
Liberty Center Local Schools started around 1870–1880 with its first "Liberty Center board of education." The first students were housed in a one-room log structure that lasted until 1870 when it was burned to the ground as a result of lightning. John V. Cuff was the school districts first superintendent and grades 9-12 were established in 1877. The graduating class of 1884 was the first in the history of Liberty Center and also believed to be the first in Henry County. In 1886 Liberty Center Schools constructed a three-story brick building initially to house all grades and would undergo multiple renovations and expansion in 1925 and 1937. In 1939 Liberty Center Local Schools consolidated with Washington Township Schools. In 1953 a new auditorium gymnasium and agricultural tech facilities were added. In 1960 a new elementary building to house grades K-4 was completed and in 1972 new additions were made to the elementary building to house grades 5 & 6. On November 12, 1972, the high school building was destroyed by fire of an unspecified cause. Only the gym and AG. tech buildings were undamaged and preserved.

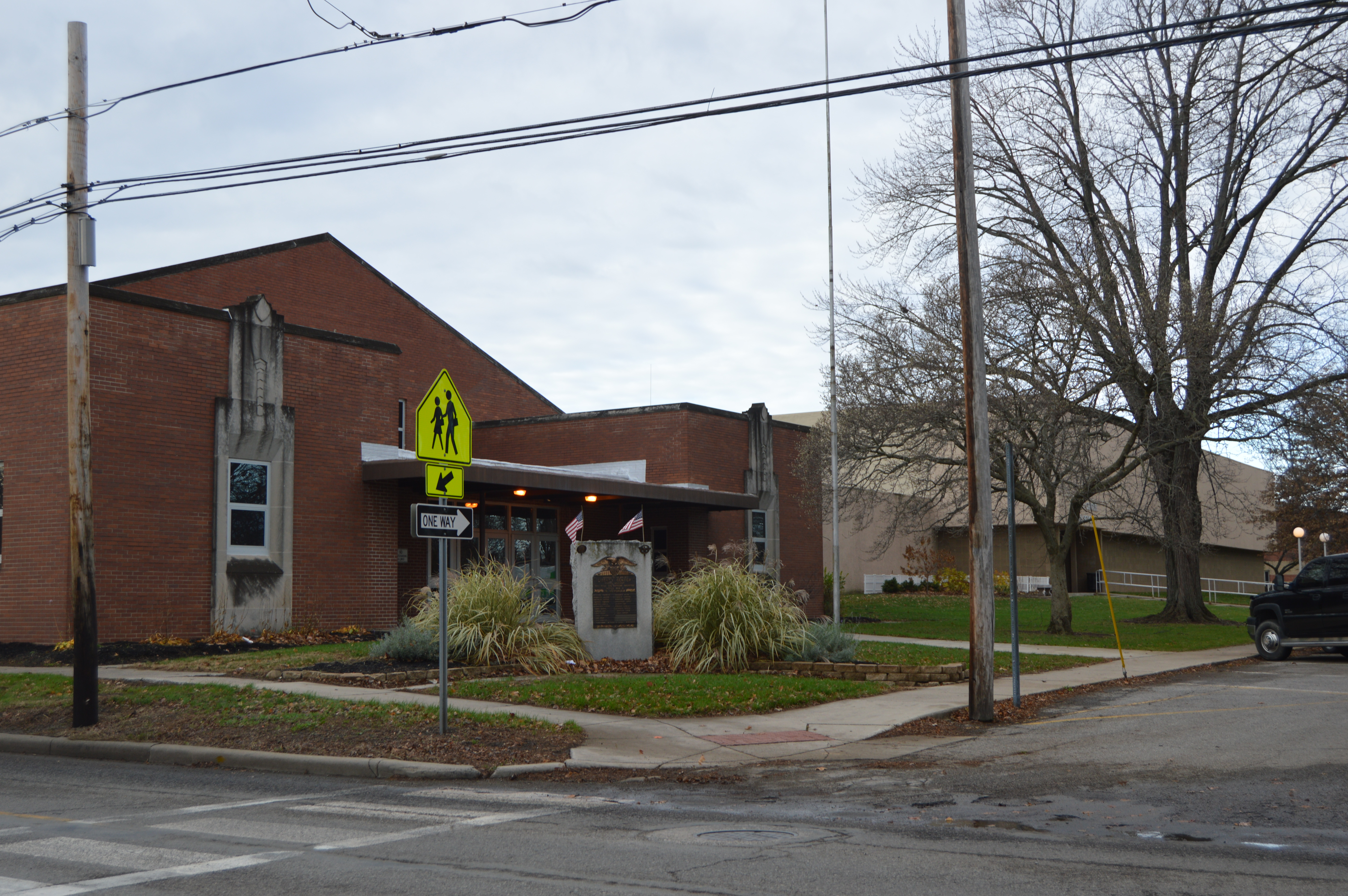
Front of the former high school.

High school students would be housed in the elementary building while elementary students would attend classes in churches and various public buildings until the completion of the new high school building. In 1975 a new two-storied structure with dual-learning classrooms was completed to house grades 7-12. In 1996, as a result of growing enrollment and district population, Liberty Center Local Schools completed a new junior high structure to house grades 6-8 which included a new multi-purpose gymnasium and lobby/cafeteria which also connected the high school building to the elementary building. In May 2015 voters approved of a $42 million levy to construct a new two-storied K-12 building which was completed and opened in January 2018. The 1953 AG. tech building and gym, the 1960/72 elementary building and the 1975 high school building, were all demolished after a combined total of 65 years of service. The former 1996 middle school building and varsity gym were preserved with the remaining classrooms converted into school district central offices and preschool classrooms.

== Academic achievement ==
Liberty Center has received the prestigious Ohio's BEST Award from the Ohio Department of Education. In addition, Liberty Center is one of the first schools in Ohio that is ISO 9002 registered.

== Athletics ==
Liberty Center is a charter member of the Northwest Ohio Athletic League (NWOAL), having been formed in 1926.

=== Ohio High School Athletic Association State Championships ===
- Boys' Football – Champions: 1997, 2025; Runners-Up: 1993, 1998, 2023, 2024
- Boys' Track and Field – Champions: 1998; Runners-Up: 1999
- Girls' Cross country – Champions: 2011, 2012, 2013, 2026; Runners-Up: 2010
- Girls' Track and Field – Runners-Up: 1989

=== NWOAL championships (1926-) ===
- Football: 1937, 1965*, 1992, 1998, 1999*, 2000, 2001, 2011, 2019, 2022, 2023, 2024, 2025
- Volleyball: 2004, 2023
- Boys' Cross Country: 1972, 1975, 2014, 2017
- Girls' Cross Country: 2009, 2010, 2011, 2012, 2014, 2015, 2016
- Boys' Basketball: 1937-38*, 1948-49*, 1988–89, 2004-05*, 2023-24.
- Girls' Basketball: 1984-85*, 2000–01
- Wrestling: 1974-75, 1984–85, 1987–88, 1999-00, 2003-04*, 2004–05, 2005–06, 2008-09
- Boys' Bowling: 2013, 2015, 2016
- Girls' Bowling: 2016
- Baseball: 1967*
- Boys' Track & Field: 1974, 1981*, 1994, 1997, 1998, 2004,2025
- Girls' Track & Field: 1989, 1997, 1998, 1999, 2001, 2002, 2012, 2018

=== Northern Border League championships (1969-1978) ===
- Boys' Cross Country: 1971, 1972, 1975

Note: shared league titles are denoted with an asterisk (*)
