= Wauseon High School =

Location
- 840 Parkview Street; Wauseon, Ohio 43567; United States
- Coordinates: 41°33′13″N 84°7′41″W

Information
- Type: Public, coeducational
- School district: Wauseon Exempted Village School District
- Principal: Keith Leatherman
- Teaching staff: 28.84 (FTE)
- Grades: 9–12
- Student to teacher ratio: 18.59
- Colors: Red, white, black
- Fight song: Across the Field
- Athletics conference: Northwest Ohio Athletic League
- Team name: Indians
- Rival: Archbold Blue Streaks
- Newspaper: The Red and White
- Yearbook: The Chief
- Website: www.wauseonindians.org

Wauseon High School is a public high school in Wauseon, Ohio. It is the only high school in the Wauseon Exempted Village School District. Keith Leatherman is the principal, and Trent Thomas is the assistant.

== Academics ==
Wauseon High School received the "Excellent" rating from the Ohio Department of Education for eleven years, from 2003–2004 to 2014–2015, when the ODE ceased the grading format. This included receiving the "Excellent with Distinction" honor for seven years.

== Athletics ==
Wauseon's athletic teams are known as the "Indians," their colors are red, white, and black. Wauseon is a Northwest Ohio Athletic League charter member, having competed in the NWOAL since 1926.

=== State championships ===
- Football: 1993
- Baseball: 1995
- Girls basketball: 1997
- Wrestling: 2018

=== State runners-up ===
- Boys basketball: 1994, 2017
- Wrestling: 2016, 2017

== Notable alumni ==
- Elliott Mealer: professional football player in the National Football League (NFL)
- Rick Volk: a professional football player in the NFL
- Marjorie M. Whiteman: International law expert and member of the Ohio Women's Hall of Fame
- Thomas Sloan: Actor, musician, and YouTuber
