= Swanton High School =

Public, coeducational high school in Swanton, Ohio, United States

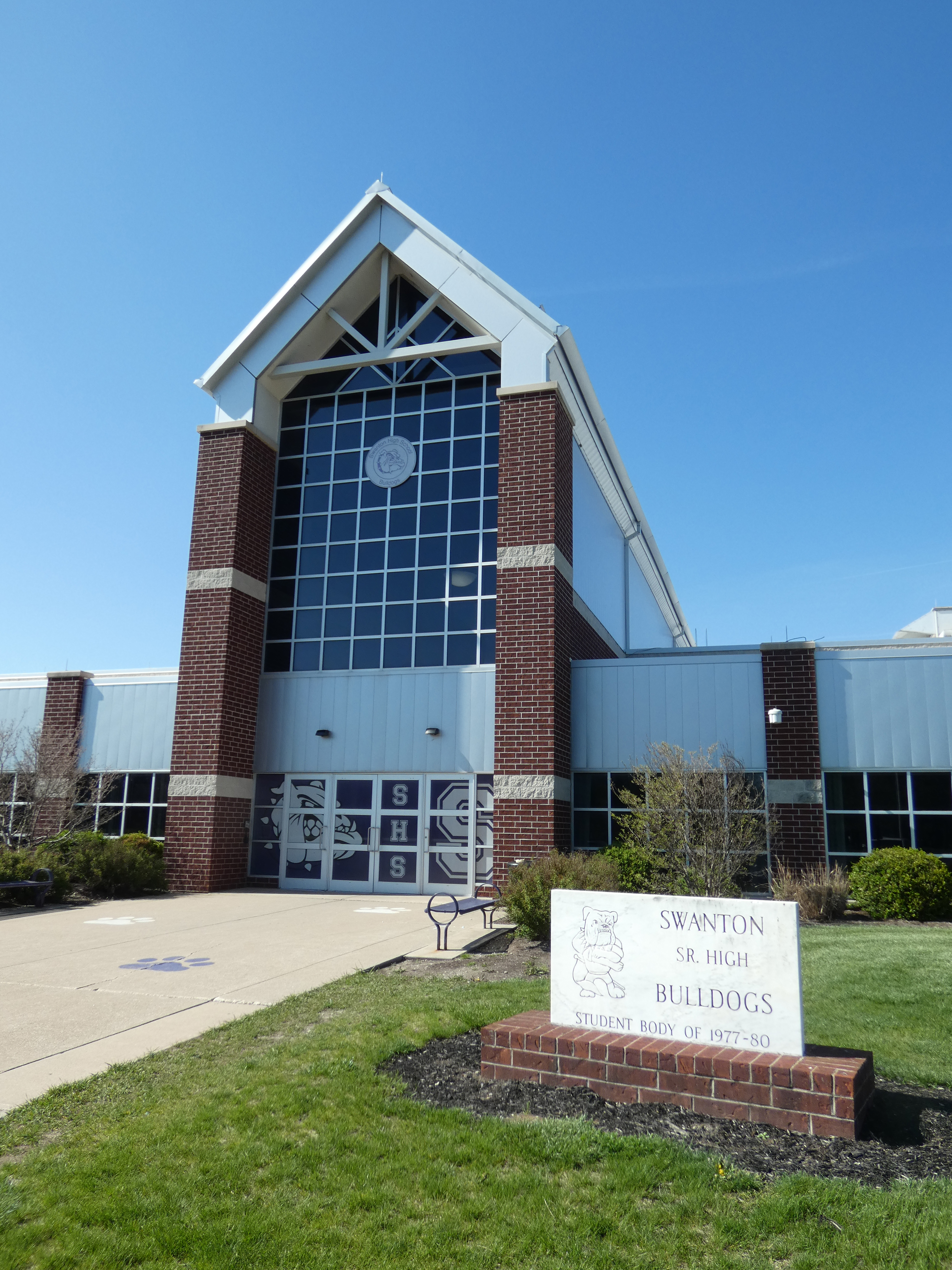

Location
- 601 North Main Street; Swanton, (Fulton County), Ohio 43558; United States; 41°35′36″N 83°53′59″W

Information
- Type: Public, Coeducational high school
- School district: Swanton Local School District
- Superintendent: Christopher Lake
- Principal: Anthony Menna
- Teaching staff: 20.49 (FTE)
- Grades: 9-12
- Student to teacher ratio: 15.86
- Colors: Purple and white
- Athletics conference: NWOAL
- Team name: Bulldogs
- Rival: Pike-Delta-York, Evergreen
- Website: Swanton High School

Swanton High School is a public high school in Swanton, Ohio, USA. It is the only high school in the Swanton Local School District.

== School details ==
In the 2002-03 school year, Swanton High moved into its new school building.

The school provides for 9th to 12th grades. During the 2005-06 school year, there were of 145 freshmen, 127 sophomores, 142 juniors and 127 seniors, totalling 541 students. 495 of those students were Caucasian, 9 were Black, 15 Hispanic and 6 of other races. The student-to-teacher ratio was 24:7.

== Athletics ==
Swanton High School's mascot is the Bulldog. Its colors are purple and white. The school is a member of the Northwest Ohio Athletic League. The current athletic director is Wade Haselman.

=== NWOAL championships (1957-1969, 1978) ===
- American football: 1981, 1985*, 1989*, 1991, 1995, 2015*
- Boys' cross country: 1981, 1982, 1986, 1987, 1988, 1989, 1990, 1991, 1992
- Girls' cross country: 1987, 1988, 1989, 1990, 1991, 1992, 2003
- Golf: 1992, 1993
- Girls' soccer: 2015, 2016, 2020*
- Volleyball: 2017, 2020*
- Boys' basketball: 1963-64*, 1978–79, 1979–80, 1980-81*, 1981–82, 1987-88*, 2014-15*, 2021–22
- Girls' basketball: 1980-81*, 1981–82, 1982–83, 1984-85*, 1988-89*, 1990–91, 2006–07
- Wrestling: 1978-79, 1979-80*, 1980-81*, 1981–82, 1982-83*, 1985–86, 1986–87, 1990–91
- Baseball: 1965, 1966, 1983, 1984, 1989, 1990*
- Boys' track and field: 1987, 1988*, 1989
- Girls' track and field: 1979, 1987, 1990, 1991, 1992

=== Northern Border League championships (1969-1978) ===
- American football: 1975*, 1976
- Boys' cross country: 1970, 1973, 1974
- Golf: 1969
- Wrestling: 1972-73, 1974–75, 1975–76, 1977–78
- Baseball: 1970*, 1972*
- Boys' track and field: 1974
- Girls' track and field: 1977, 1978

Note: shared league titles are denoted with an asterisk (*)

== Band ==
The Swanton High School marching band and concert band are members of class "C" in the Ohio Music Education Association. The band hosts a yearly marching band competition called "The Bulldog Bowl".

== Notable alumni ==
- Fred Sturt - NFL football player
- Emerson Cole - member of 1950 NFL Champion Cleveland Browns
- Paul Schudel - NCAA football coach
- Karl Koepfer - former NFL football player
- Gary Jones - costume designer and Academy Award nominee
