= Marjorie M. Whiteman =

American lawyer (1898–1986)

Marjorie Whiteman
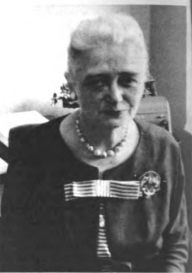
- Born: Marjorie Millace Whiteman; 1898; Liberty Township, Butler County, Ohio, U.S.
- Died: July 6, 1986 (aged 87); Liberty Center, Ohio, U.S.

Academic background
- Education: Ohio Wesleyan University (BA); Yale University (LLB, SJD)

Academic work
- Discipline: Law
- Sub-discipline: International law
- Institutions: United States Department of State

Marjorie Millace Whiteman (1898— July 6, 1986) was an American legal scholar and author known for her fifteen-volume Digest of International Law, also referred to as the "Whiteman Digest". She served in the United States Department of State for over forty years and was inducted into the Ohio Women's Hall of Fame in 1979.

== Early life and education ==
Marjorie Millace Whiteman was born in Liberty Township, Henry County, Ohio, in 1898. She graduated from Wauseon High School and later Ohio Wesleyan University in 1920. Whiteman earned an L.L.B. (1927) and Doctor of Law (1928) from Yale Law School, where she served as an editor of the Yale Law Journal. She studied at National University and was a Carnegie Fellow in international law, which became her specialty.

== Career ==
Whiteman taught high school history from 1920 to 1926. In December 1929, she joined the United States Department of State as Assistant Solicitor, beginning a career that lasted four decades and during which she advised ten secretaries of state on international law. For part of this period, she served as special assistant to Green Hackworth, then the department's legal adviser. She helped to draft the charter of the United Nations in 1945 and the Universal Declaration of Human Rights three years later.

From 1945 to 1951 she acted as an advisor to former First Lady Eleanor Roosevelt, who was then serving as the United States representative to the United Nations General Assembly. She also participated in many Pan-American Conferences, notably the one in 1948 at which the charter for the Organization of American States was drafted. When the State Department was reorganized in 1949, Whiteman was named the first assistant legal adviser for American republic affairs. In 1958, she was awarded for outstanding Government service by the National Civil Service League.

Whiteman was a key contributor to Green Hackworth's eight-volume Digest of International Law (1937–1943) and capped her career by later publishing her own 15-volume Digest of International Law, completed in 1969. Her digest included sections on new and emerging areas of international law, including outer space and aviation, disarmament, Antarctica and the Continental Shelf, and international organizations. Known as the "Whiteman Digest", it continues to be a leading reference work in the field for government officials and scholars of international law.

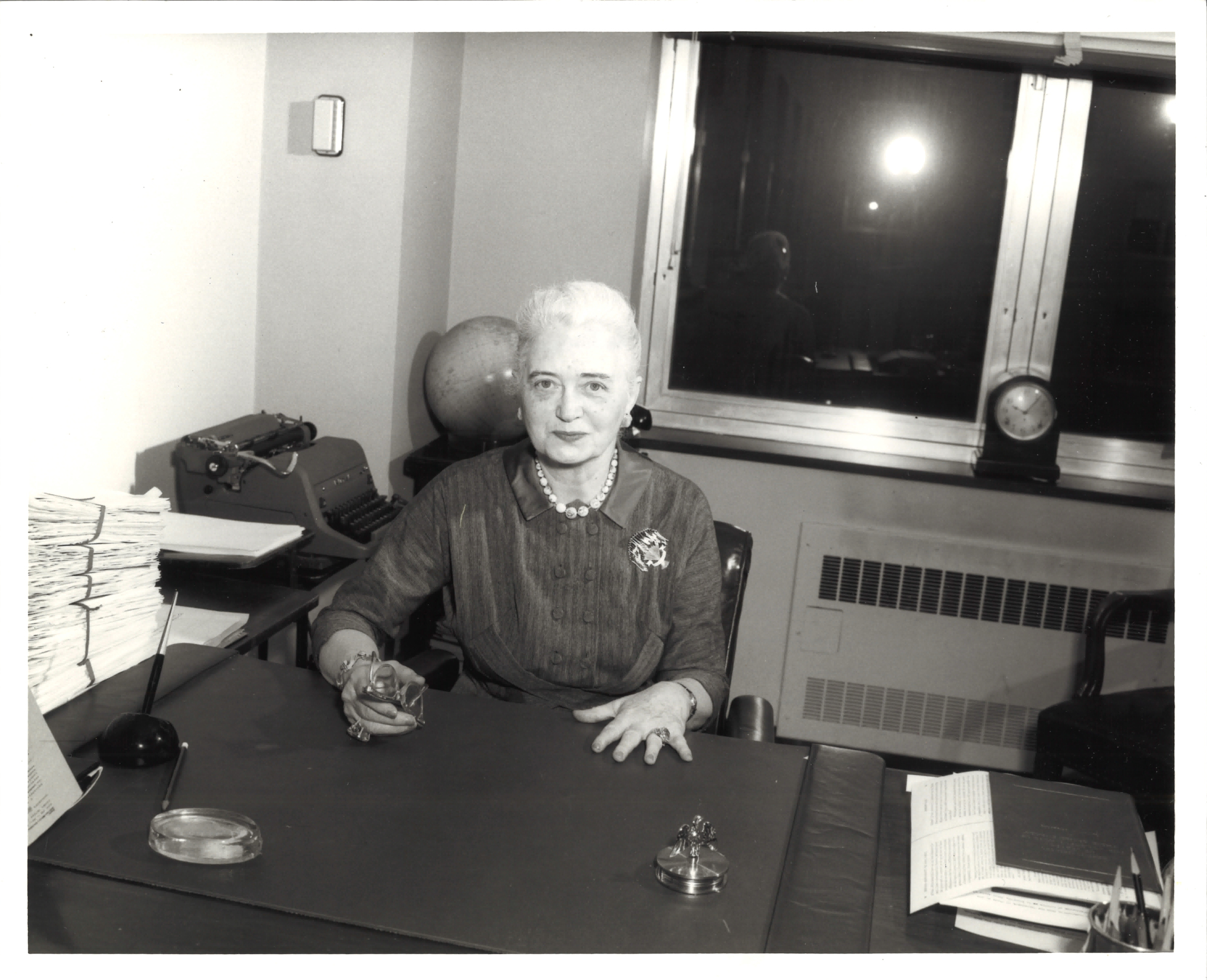
Whiteman at her desk

Whiteman served as vice-president of the American Society of International Law. She was inducted into the Ohio Women's Hall of Fame in 1979.
