= Swanton Local School District =

School district in Ohio, United States

Address
- 108 North Main St Swanton, Ohio, 43558; United States
- Coordinates: 41°35′14″N 83°53′29″W

District information
- Type: Public
- Grades: PK–12
- Schools: 3
- NCES District ID: 3904709

Students and staff
- Students: 1,111 (2024–2025)
- Teachers: 71.89 (on an FTE basis) (2024–2025)
- Staff: 215.51 (on an FTE basis) (2024–2025)
- Student–teacher ratio: 15.45 (2024–2025)

Other information
- Website: www.swantonschools.org

Swanton Local School District is a school district in Northwest Ohio, USA., which serves students who live in the village of Swanton, located in Fulton County and Lucas County, and including portions of Fulton, Swancreek, Spencer, Harding and Swanton townships. The superintendent is Chris Lake, and the 2025 board of education consists of John Schaller – (president), Steve Brehmer – (vice president), Sheila Horseman – (treasurer), Kris Oberheim, David Smith and Ben Remer.

== Grades K-4 ==
Grades Kindergarten to Fourth Grade go to Swanton Elementary School.

== Grades 5-8 ==
Grades Fifth Grade to Eighth Grade go to Swanton Middle School.

== Grades 9-12 ==
Grades Ninth Grade to Twelfth Grade go to Swanton High School
