= Bryan High School (Ohio) =

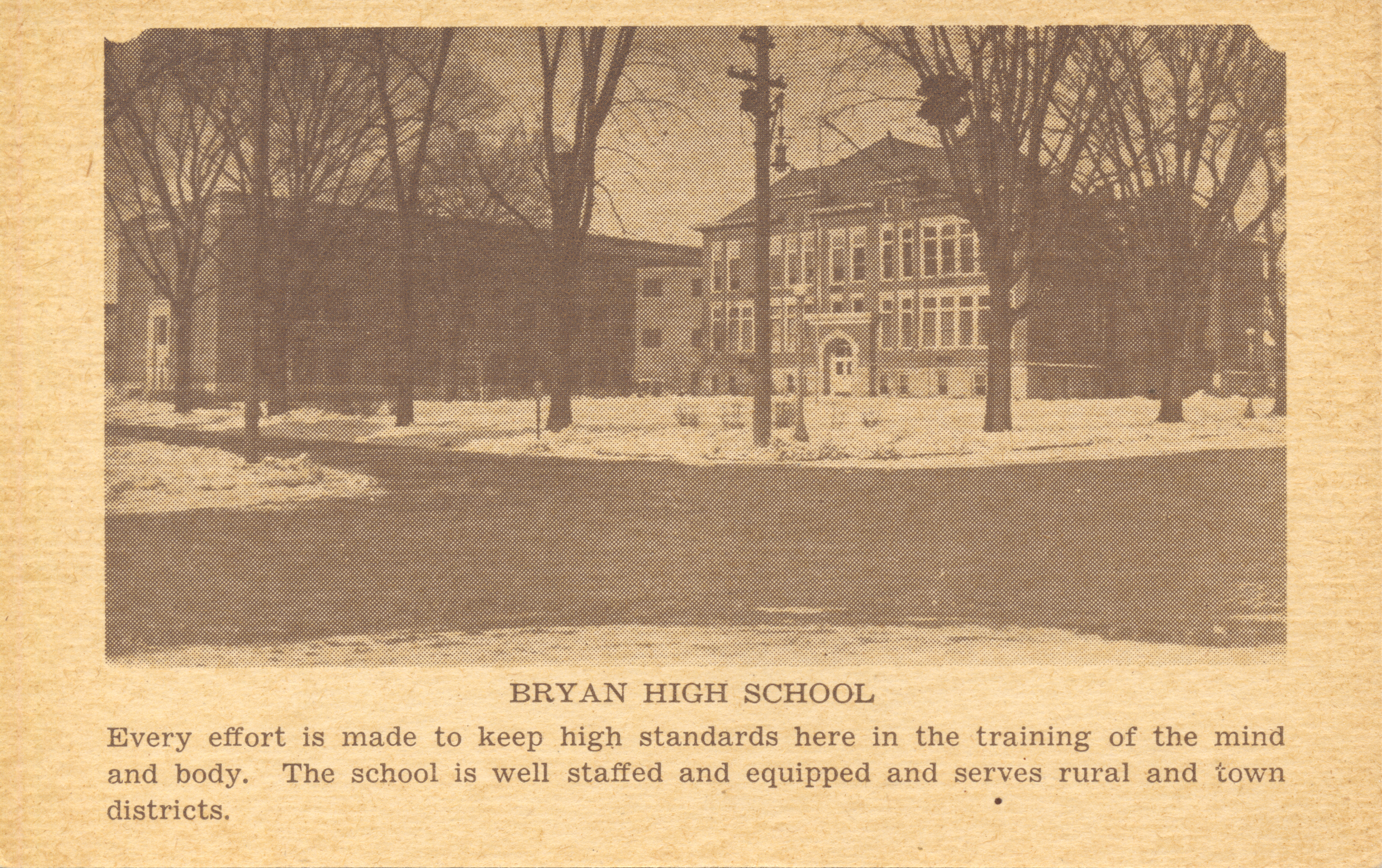
- Historical post card featuring the school

Location
- 1000 W Fountain Grove Dr; Bryan, Ohio 43506; United States; 41.4573°N 84.5677°W

Information
- School district: Bryan City School District
- Teaching staff: 55.28 (FTE)
- Grades: 9–12
- Student to teacher ratio: 16.93
- Colors: Purple and gold
- Team name: Golden Bears
- Rival: Montpelier High School
- Website: www.bryanschools.net/buildings/bryan-middlehigh-6-12

Bryan High School is a public high school in Bryan, Ohio. It is the only high school in the Bryan City School District and serves students in grades 9 through 12. Athletic teams are known as the Golden Bears. They are members of the Northwest Ohio Athletic League and are the largest school participating in the league. As of the 2021–22 school year, enrollment is 546 students.

As of 2025 the school’s principal is Steven Alspaugh, and the superintendent is Mark Rairigh.

== Athletics ==
=== State championships ===
- Baseball – 1975
- Boys cross country – 1995
- Girls bowling – 2020

== Notable alumni ==
- Chris Carpenter, professional baseball player in Major League Baseball
- Steve Fireovid, professional baseball player in Major League Baseball
- Matt Wisler, professional baseball player in Major League Baseball
