= Emerson Cole =

American football player (1927–2019)

No. 70, 30, 31
- Positions: Fullback, linebacker, defensive back

Personal information
- Born: December 10, 1927; Carrier Mills, Illinois, U.S.
- Died: June 4, 2019 (aged 91); Toledo, Ohio, U.S.
- Listed height: 6 ft 2 in (1.88 m)
- Listed weight: 215 lb (98 kg)

Career information
- High school: Swanton (OH)
- College: Toledo
- NFL draft: 1950: 12th round, 156th overall pick

Career history
- Cleveland Browns (1950–1952); Chicago Bears (1952)

Awards and highlights
- NFL champion (1950); Toledo Varsity T Hall of Fame (1984); Swanton High School Hall of Fame

Career NFL statistics
- Rushing yards: 357
- Rushing average: 5
- Receptions: 4
- Receiving yards: 30
- Total touchdowns: 1
- Stats at Pro Football Reference

Emerson Elvin Cole (December 10, 1927 – June 4, 2019) was an American professional football fullback and linebacker who played for the Cleveland Browns and Chicago Bears in the National Football League (NFL) in the early 1950s. He played college football at the University of Toledo, and still held the school record for rushing yards in a single season, with 1,162, as of 2013.

Cole was born in Illinois and grew up in Swanton, Ohio, where he was a standout athlete in high school. He attended Toledo on an athletic scholarship and was a mainstay on the football team between 1947 and 1949, setting several school records. The Browns selected him late in the 1950 NFL draft, and groomed him as the replacement for Marion Motley. Cole ran for more than 100 yards in 1950, when the Browns won the NFL championship, and saw his playing time increase the following year after Motely was injured. He was cut, however, in 1952 after coming into conflict with head coach Paul Brown.

After a short stint with the Chicago Bears, Cole retired from football and became a deputy sheriff back in Ohio. He later held jobs with the Ohio Civil Rights Commission, including as the statewide compliance director. He retired in 1986. Cole was inducted into Toledo's athletics hall of fame in 1984.

== Early life and college ==
Cole was born in Carrier Mills, Illinois, where his father worked as a miner. His family shuttled back and forth between Illinois and Toledo, Ohio when he was a child as his father got seasonal work in mines and at a foundry in Toledo. They bought a farm and settled in Swanton, Ohio, a small town near Toledo, in 1938. Cole attended the local Swanton High School, where he played football and baseball and ran track. He became the starting tailback in his sophomore year and played on the team for three seasons. He was named the team's Most Valuable Player once.

After graduating in 1946, Cole attended the University of Toledo on an athletic scholarship. Playing for Toledo's football team between 1947 and 1949, he had 2,300 rushing yards as a fullback and 33 rushing touchdowns. As of 2013, he holds the Toledo Rockets single-season rushing record, with 1,162 yards, and is second in career touchdowns and touchdowns in a season. Cole was named a first-team All-Ohio player in his senior year and was an honorable mention All-American.

== Professional career ==
The Cleveland Browns of the National Football League (NFL) selected Cole in the 12th round of the 1950 draft, making him the first African-American player selected by the Browns since joining the league that year. The Browns had four other black players on their roster, including fullback Marion Motley, linebacker Bill Willis and punter Horace Gillom, but they had all joined the team during its years in the defunct All-America Football Conference.

Cleveland head coach Paul Brown groomed Cole to replace Motley, who was nearing the end of his career in 1950. Cole played in all 12 of the team's games that year, running for 105 yards on 26 carries. He was also used as a linebacker on defense. The Browns finished the regular season with a 10–2 win–loss record and beat the Los Angeles Rams to win the NFL championship.

While Cole appeared to be Motley's chosen successor at fullback in an offense that featured quarterback Otto Graham and ends Mac Speedie and Dante Lavelli, his relationship with Brown was strained. Cole felt that Brown did not like that he challenged his authority and refused to submit to his authoritarian coaching style. Cole saw his carries increase in 1951, when Motley was injured. The Browns again made the championship game that year but lost to the Rams. Brown cut Cole during the following season, and he spent the remainder of the year with the Chicago Bears before leaving football. Cleveland halfback Dub Jones later criticized Brown's handling of Cole, calling it the biggest waste of talent he had ever seen.

Like other black players of his era, Cole frequently endured racist taunts on the field and racial discrimination off the field. Black players typically stayed in separate hotels from the white players, and the groups did not mingle socially. White players on opposing teams stepped on the black players after plays were over; they often stepped on Motley's hands and once stepped hard on Cole's face, cutting his mouth. Brown did not tolerate racism within the team, but Cole later said he thought Brown considered black athletes to be physically superior but intellectually inferior to whites.

== Later life ==
Following his playing career, Cole went back to Ohio and took a $2,000-a-year job as a deputy in the Lucas County sheriff's department. After having trouble getting promoted because of racial discrimination, he left for a job in the county welfare department and later in its anti-poverty department. He later got a job in Toledo as the regional director of the Ohio Civil Rights Commission, a body that oversees enforcement of anti-discrimination laws. He spent nine years there before being promoted to the commission's statewide compliance director in Columbus, Ohio. He retired in 1986. Cole was inducted into the University of Toledo Varsity T Club Hall of Fame in 1984. He is also a member of Swanton High School's hall of fame.

He died on 4 June 2019, at the age of 91.
