= Swanton, Ohio =

- Village
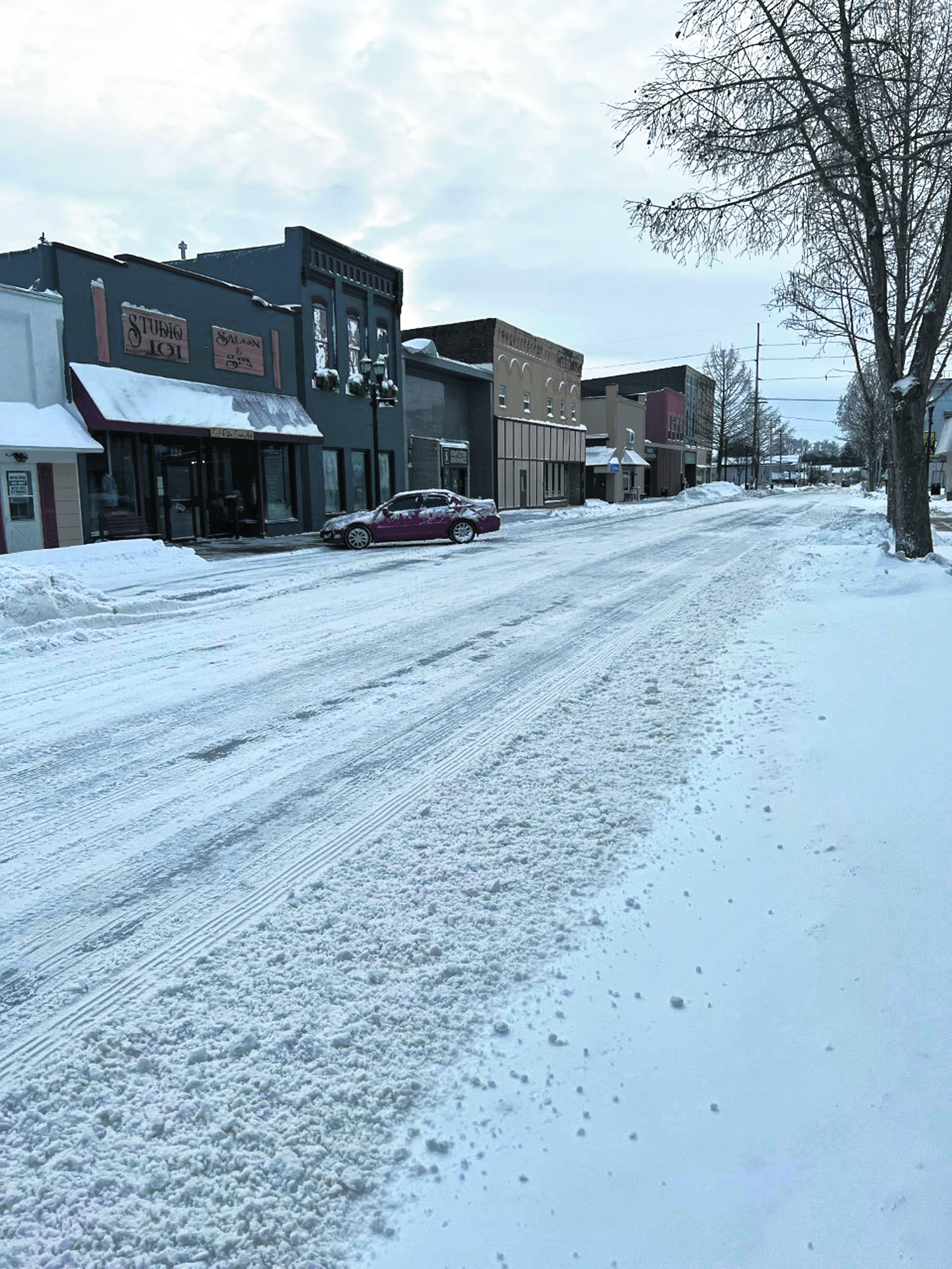
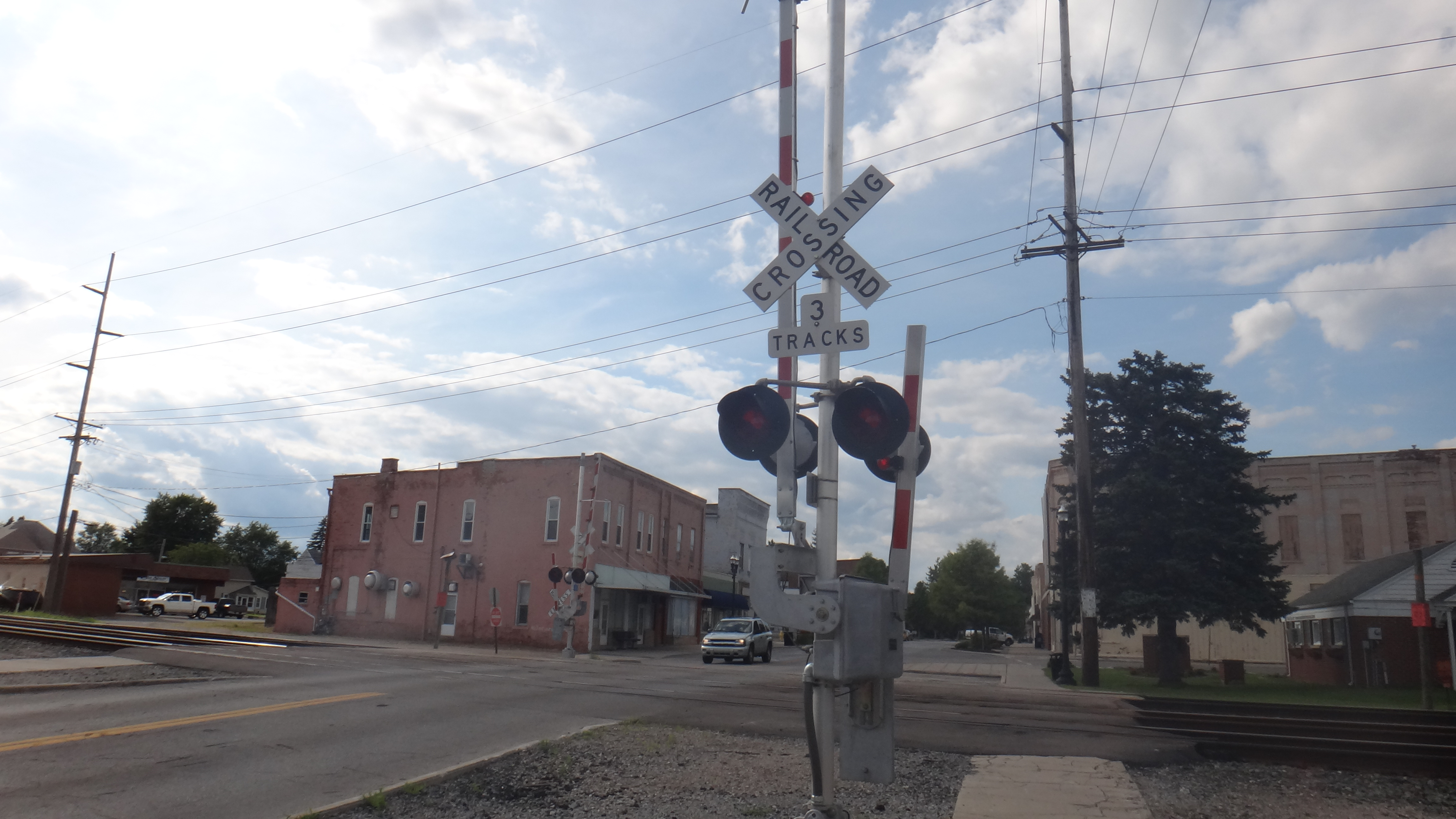
- Top: Downtown Swanton, looking south Bottom: Downtown Swanton, looking north.
- Motto: "Honoring the past - Committed to the future!"
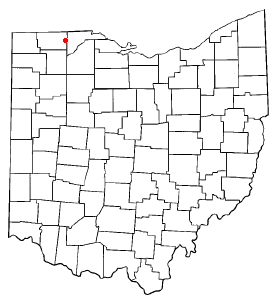
- Location of Swanton, Ohio

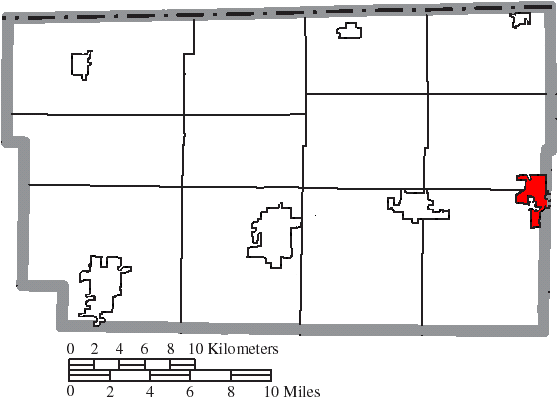
- Location of Swanton in Fulton County
- Coordinates: 41°34′59″N 83°52′48″W
- Country: United States
- State: Ohio
- Counties: Fulton, Lucas
- Townships: Fulton, Swan Creek, Swanton

Area
  - Total: 3.44 sq mi (8.90 km^{2})
  - Land: 3.40 sq mi (8.80 km^{2})
  - Water: 0.039 sq mi (0.10 km^{2})
- Elevation: 666 ft (203 m)

Population (2020)
  - Total: 3,897
  - Density: 1,147/sq mi (442.8/km^{2})
- Time zone: UTC-5 (Eastern (EST))
  - Summer (DST): UTC-4 (EDT)
- ZIP code: 43558
- Area code: 419
- FIPS code: 39-75896
- GNIS feature ID: 2399940
- Website: www.villageofswantonohio.com

Swanton is a village located in Fulton and Lucas counties in the U.S. state of Ohio. The population was 3,897 at the 2020 census. Total area is 8.90 km^{2} (3.44 sq mi).

== History ==
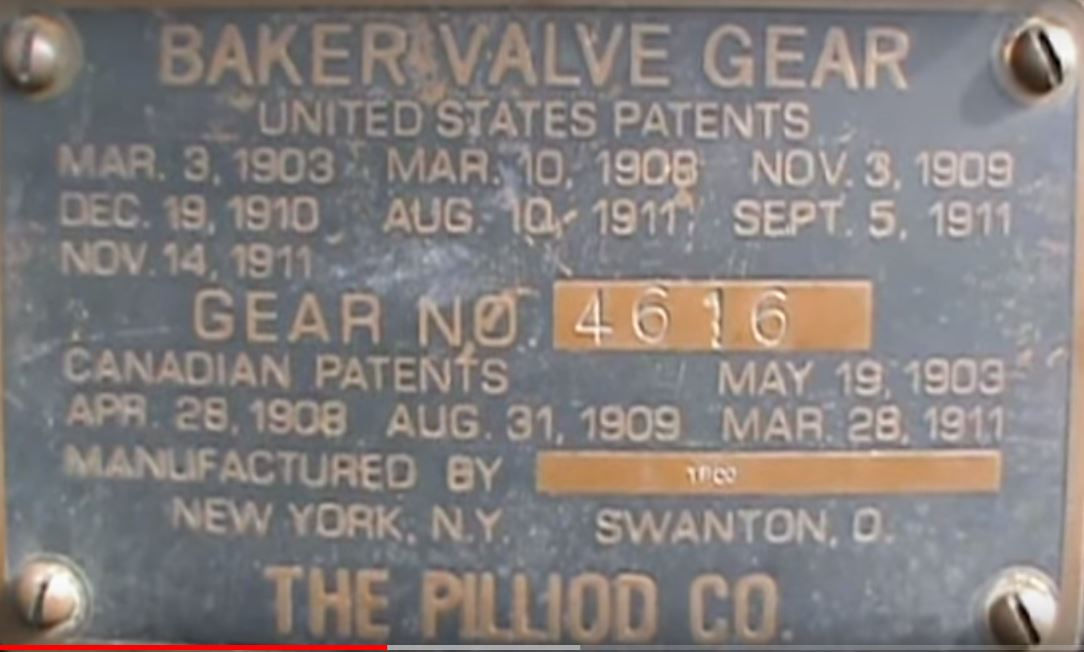
Manufacturer's ID plate on Strasburg Rail Road Locomotive #475 in Ronks, Pennsylvania. The locomotive was built by Baldwin in Philadelphia.

A post office called Swanton has been in operation since 1827. The village takes its name from nearby Swan Creek.

In the heyday of steam power, Swanton was home to the A. D. Baker Company, a manufacturer of steam powered traction engines and road contractors' equipment. It was at the Baker Company that an improved valve gear for steam engines was developed. A Baker employee named Gifford is credited with the initial idea, which was subsequently developed into the Baker valve gear and patented in 1903. Baker valve gear was eventually manufactured by The Pilliod Company, another Swanton business. Baker valve gear from Pilliod saw widespread use on U.S. steam locomotives for railroads in the first half of the 20th century.

On February 15, 1992, Air Transport International Flight 805 crashed in Swanton, killing all four people on board.

On June 6, 2019, a vehicle left parked on the tracks next to the Main Street railroad crossing resulted in a derailment that knocked out power to the town and much of the surrounding area, and hampered traffic on one of the main rail lines linking the Midwest to the East Coast.

== Geography ==
According to the United States Census Bureau, the village has a total area of 3.13 square miles (8.11 km^{2}), of which 3.09 square miles (8.00 km^{2}) is land and 0.04 square miles (0.10 km^{2}) is water.

== Demographics ==
Historical population
Census	Pop.	Note	%±
1880	335		—
1890	508		51.6%
1900	887		74.6%
1910	1,058		19.3%
1920	1,248		18.0%
1930	1,505		20.6%
1940	1,594		5.9%
1950	1,740		9.2%
1960	2,306		32.5%
1970	2,927		26.9%
1980	3,424		17.0%
1990	3,557		3.9%
2000	3,307		−7.0%
2010	3,690		11.6%
2020	3,897		5.6%
U.S. Decennial Census

=== 2020 census ===
As of the 2020 census, Swanton had a population of 3,897. The median age was 40.1 years. 23.2% of residents were under the age of 18 and 20.2% of residents were 65 years of age or older. For every 100 females there were 93.1 males, and for every 100 females age 18 and over there were 88.7 males age 18 and over.

0.0% of residents lived in urban areas, while 100.0% lived in rural areas.

There were 1,514 households in Swanton, of which 31.8% had children under the age of 18 living in them. Of all households, 49.9% were married-couple households, 15.8% were households with a male householder and no spouse or partner present, and 26.6% were households with a female householder and no spouse or partner present. About 26.0% of all households were made up of individuals and 12.1% had someone living alone who was 65 years of age or older.

There were 1,581 housing units, of which 4.2% were vacant. The homeowner vacancy rate was 2.0% and the rental vacancy rate was 3.2%.

Racial composition as of the 2020 census
Race	Number	Percent
White	3,599	92.4%
Black or African American	55	1.4%
American Indian and Alaska Native	6	0.2%
Asian	8	0.2%
Native Hawaiian and Other Pacific Islander	0	0.0%
Some other race	34	0.9%
Two or more races	195	5.0%
Hispanic or Latino (of any race)	169	4.3%

=== 2010 census ===
As of the census of 2010, there were 3,690 people, 1,409 households, and 1,018 families living in the village. The population density was 1,194.2 inhabitants per square mile (461.1/km^{2}). There were 1,498 housing units at an average density of 484.8 units per square mile (187.2 units/km^{2}). The racial makeup of the village was 97.1% White, 0.9% African American, 0.2% Native American, 0.1% Asian, 0.3% from other races, and 1.3% from two or more races. Hispanic or Latino of any race were 3.5% of the population.

There were 1,409 households, of which 34.8% had children under the age of 18 living with them, 54.3% were married couples living together, 12.3% had a female householder with no husband present, 5.7% had a male householder with no wife present, and 27.8% were non-families. 22.9% of all households were made up of individuals, and 8.6% had someone living alone who was 65 years of age or older. The average household size was 2.56 and the average family size was 2.99.

The median age in the village was 38 years. 26% of residents were under the age of 18; 7.3% were between the ages of 18 and 24; 25.9% were from 25 to 44; 26.9% were from 45 to 64; and 13.9% were 65 years of age or older. The gender makeup of the village was 48.8% male and 51.2% female.

=== 2000 census ===
As of the census of 2000, there were 3,307 people, 1,241 households, and 903 families living in the village. The population density was 1,388.0 inhabitants per square mile (535.9/km^{2}). There were 1,292 housing units at an average density of 542.3 units per square mile (209.4 units/km^{2}). The racial makeup of the village was 98.43% White, 0.18% African American, 0.18% Native American, 0.18% Asian, 0.60% from other races, and 0.42% from two or more races. Hispanic or Latino of any race were 1.39% of the population.

There were 1,241 households, out of which 35.4% had children under the age of 18 living with them, 59.3% were married couples living together, 9.7% had a female householder with no husband present, and 27.2% were non-families. 23.9% of all households were made up of individuals, and 11.1% had someone living alone who was 65 years of age or older. The average household size was 2.57 and the average family size was 3.05.

In the village, the population was spread out, with 26.0% under the age of 18, 7.3% from 18 to 24, 29.0% from 25 to 44, 22.8% from 45 to 64, and 14.8% who were 65 years of age or older. The median age was 37 years. For every 100 females there were 90.6 males. For every 100 females age 18 and over, there were 90.6 males.

The median income for a household in the village was $44,127, and the median income for a family was $55,313. Males had a median income of $40,746 versus $32,207 for females. The per capita income for the village was $20,160. About 1.5% of families and 4.6% of the population were below the poverty line, including 1.4% of those under age 18 and 6.4% of those age 65 or over.

== Parks and recreation ==
- Swanton Memorial Park is home to one of E. M. Viquesney's "Spirit of the American Doughboy" statues. The sculpture was one of several donated as a gift by France to U.S. cities that had lost many soldiers during World War I. It is described as a "Figure of a World War I infantryman advancing through the stumps and barbed wire of No Man's Land. He holds a grenade in his raised proper right hand and a rifle in his proper left hand." The Smithsonian Institution Research Information System lists the statue as being installed in 1926, "administered by City of Swanton, Parks Division, Swanton, Ohio."
- Memorial Park is home to recreation facilities including several baseball diamonds. Ai Creek runs through the park. It also has soccer fields, sand volleyball courts, tennis/pickleball courts, basketball courts, and playgrounds. Land was donated for use by the McNeill family.
- Pilliod Park is located next to Swanton Public Library and is home to Swanton's red caboose, several gazebos, and a paved walkway. During the winter holiday it is home to Swanton's festive light display.
- Rotary Park is an offshoot of Pilliod Park.
- Oak Openings Metropark is partially located in the Village of Swanton, most notably The Cannaley Treehouse Village and much of the Beach Ridge mountain bike trail.

== Education ==
Public education in Swanton is administered by the Swanton Local School District. The District includes Swanton High School. St. Richard Catholic School is a private institution. Swanton Public Library is the village's lending library.

== Arts and culture ==
Swanton is home to an annual Corn Festival, occurring in August. The festival has a parade, volleyball competition, singing contest, car show, a resident caricaturist, much food and other festivities, along with the annual All Class high school reunion.

The Swanton Fine Art Exhibit is held each year at Valleywood Golf Club.

The Swanton Art Walk, with various artist exhibits and vendors, and the Swanton Downtown Market were inaugurated in 2022.

== Notable people ==
- Roy Beecher, MLB pitcher
- Emerson Cole, NFL fullback and wide receiver
- Karl Koepfer, NFL player
- Richard B. McQuade Jr., attorney and federal judge
- Paul Schudel, NCAA football player and coach
