= Evergreen High School (Oakhurst, California) =

High school in Oakhurst, California, USA

Coordinates: 37.329406°N 119.63705°W

Information
- School district: Yosemite Unified School District
- Principal: Jessica Fairbanks
- Teaching staff: 2 FTE
- Grades: 9-12
- Enrollment: 43

Evergreen High School is an alternative school in the Yosemite Unified School District in Oakhurst, California.

== School structure ==
The school serves grades 9-12 and has a graduation rate of 91%.

As of 2025, the school principal is Jessica Fairbanks and the assistant principal is Ron Johnson. It has 43 students and a student:teacher ratio of 18:1.
