= Evergreen School (Evergreen, Alabama) =

- U.S. National Register of Historic Places
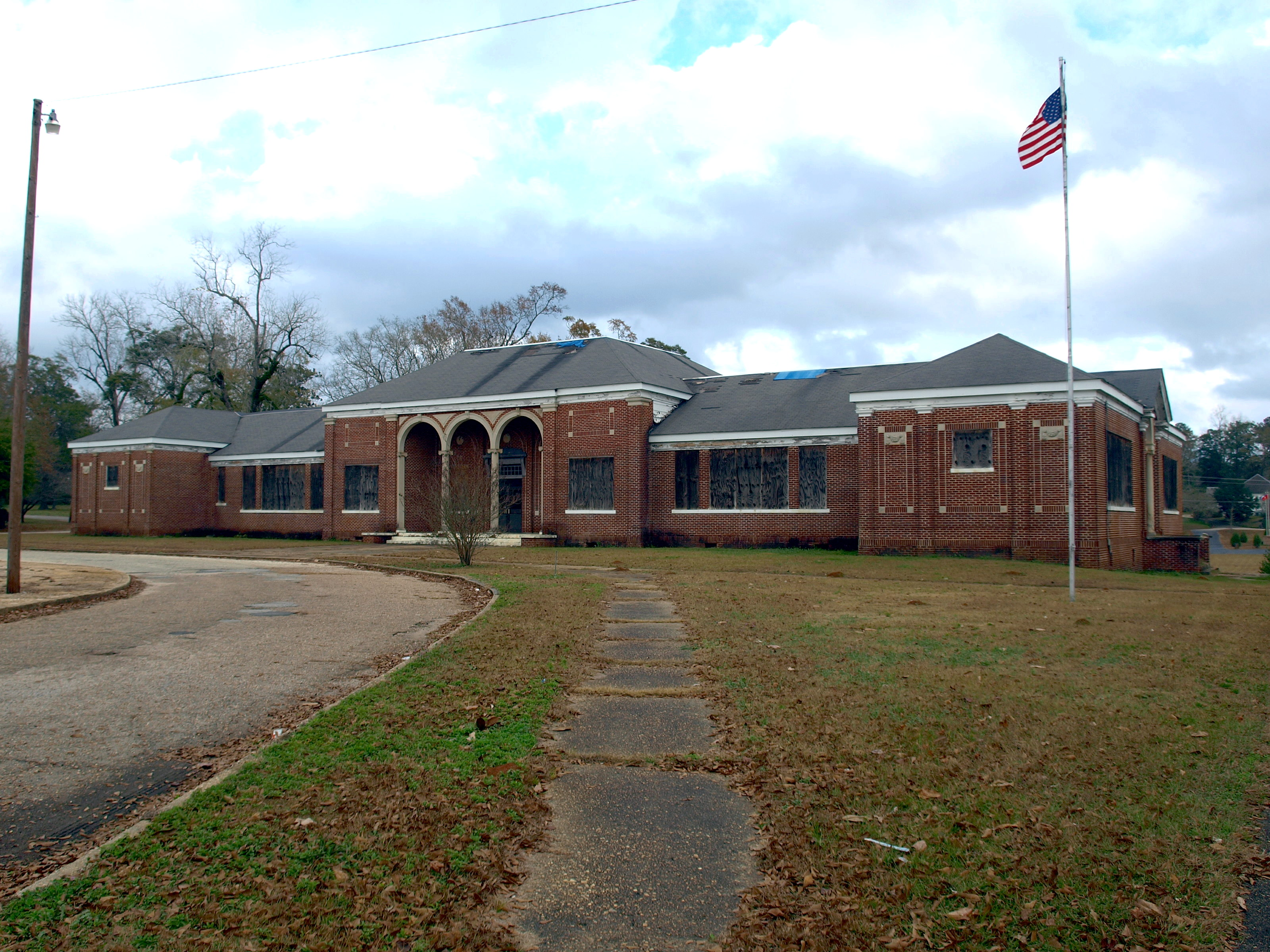

- Location within Alabama
- Location: 100 City School Dr., Evergreen, Alabama
- Coordinates: 31°26′09″N 86°57′03″W
- Area: 3 acres (1.2 ha)
- Built: 1923, c.1935, 1948
- Architectural style: Classical Revival
- NRHP reference No.: 16000398
- Added to NRHP: June 22, 2016

The Evergreen School, at 100 City School Dr. in Evergreen, Alabama, United States, was listed on the National Register of Historic Places in 2016.

It is a one-story brick Classical Revival-style building which was built in 1923 and expanded in c.1935 and 1948.
