= Wauseon Exempted Village School District =

School district in Ohio, United States

Address
- 930 East Oak Street Wauseon, Ohio, 43567; United States

District information
- Type: Public
- Grades: K–12
- NCES District ID: 3904564

Students and staff
- Students: 1,721 (2020–2021)
- Teachers: 89.02 (on an FTE basis)
- Staff: 192.9 (on an FTE basis)
- Student–teacher ratio: 19.33:1

Other information
- Website: sites.google.com/wauseonindians.org/wevs/home

The Wauseon Exempted Village School District is the public school system in Wauseon, Ohio, United States.

== Schools ==
There are four schools and three buildings in the district (Wauseon Elementary and Middle Schools share one building):

- Wauseon Primary (Formally Legget Street Primary School) - Grades Kindergarten to 2nd Grade. The principal is Blake Young.
- Wauseon Elementary School (Formally Elm Street Elementary School) - Grades 3rd to 5th. The principal is Theresa Vietmeier.
- Wauseon Middle School (Formally Burr Road Middle School) - Grades 6th to 8th. The principal is Ryan O'Dell.
- Wauseon High School - Grades 9th to 12th. The principal is Keith Leatherman.
