= Karl Koepfer =

American football player (1934–2024)

No. 60
- Position: Offensive lineman

Personal information
- Born: October 7, 1934; Swanton, Ohio, U.S.
- Died: November 10, 2024 (aged 90); Cleveland, Ohio, U.S.
- Listed height: 6 ft 2 in (1.88 m)
- Listed weight: 230 lb (104 kg)

Career information
- High school: Swanton
- College: Bowling Green (1954–1957)
- NFL draft: 1958: 8th round, 92nd overall pick

Career history
- Detroit Lions (1958)

Career NFL statistics
- Games played: 1
- Stats at Pro Football Reference

Karl Justin Koepfer (October 7, 1934 – November 10, 2024) was an American professional football player who played for Detroit Lions of the National Football League (NFL). He played college football at Bowling Green State University.
