= Evergreen Local School District =

School district in Ohio

Coordinates: 41°42′40″N 83°54′36″W

Location
- Metamora, Ohio; U.S.

District information
- Type: Public School District
- Motto: "Continually Growing Education"
- Established: 1964

Students and staff
- Students: Grades K-12

Other information

Evergreen Local School District is a school district in Northwest Ohio. The school district serves students who live in the cities and villages of Metamora, Chesterfield, and Lyons, located in Fulton County. The superintendent is Mr Wyse. Has been rated Excellent for 10 years.

== History ==
The Evergreen Local School District was formed in 1964 with the merger of Fulton, Lyons, Metamora and Chesterfield districts in Fulton and Lucas counties. The district encompasses 128 square miles. Currently Evergreen operates four school—three public and one parochial school. These schools serve more than 1400 students.

The district was named by Mrs. Ruth Gephart in the mid 60's. It was named as a symbol of continual growth; the word "ever" meaning long-living, the word "green" suggesting the deep root system representing the school and children. At first the mascot was a Viking ship representing strength. Over the years it became the Viking himself, fearless of no one. The fight song is the Notre Dame victory march.

Onward to victory, fight Vikings fight! We've got the spirit, show us your might! All those teams that we shall meet: go Vikings go, we shall defeat! Onward to victory we'll never hide. Victory our goal and strength be our guide! Shine your colors gold and green, we're loyal to Evergreen!

== Grades 9-12 ==
- Evergreen High School

== Grades 6-8 ==
- Evergreen Junior High School

== Grades K-5 ==
- Evergreen Elementary School
