= Fred Sturt =

American football player (born 1951)

No. 63, 68
- Position: Guard

Personal information
- Born: January 6, 1951 (age 75); Toledo, Ohio, U.S.
- Listed height: 6 ft 4 in (1.93 m)
- Listed weight: 255 lb (116 kg)

Career information
- High school: Swanton (OH)
- College: Bowling Green
- NFL draft: 1973: 3rd round, 59th overall pick

Career history
- Washington Redskins (1974); New England Patriots (1976–1978); New Orleans Saints (1978-1981)

Career NFL statistics
- Games played: 95
- Games started: 40
- Stats at Pro Football Reference

Frederick Neil Sturt (born January 6, 1951) is an American former professional football player who was a guard in the National Football League (NFL) for the Washington Redskins, New England Patriots, and New Orleans Saints. He played college football for the Bowling Green Falcons and was selected in the third round of the 1973 NFL draft by the St. Louis Cardinals.
