= Evergreen High School (Ohio) =

Location
- 14544 County Road 6 Metamora, Ohio 43540; United States
- 41°40′48″N 83°58′27″W

Information
- Type: Public, coeducational
- Established: 1968
- School district: Evergreen Local School District
- Principal: Brady Ruffer
- Staff: 23.00 (FTE)
- Grades: 9–12
- Student to teacher ratio: 13.87
- Colors: Green and gold
- Fight song: Viking Fight Song
- Athletics conference: Northwest Ohio Athletic League
- Team name: Vikings
- Rival: Swanton High School
- Website: evergreen.ss10.sharpschool.com/cms/one.aspx?siteId=800428

Evergreen High School is a public high school located in Metamora, Ohio, United States. It was first opened in 1968 and as of the 2021–22 school year, serves 348 students in grades 9-12. Athletic teams are known as the Vikings and the school competes as a member of the Northwest Ohio Athletic League. Evergreen has many school organizations and clubs and the school is also partnered with Four-County Vocational School in Archbold, Ohio.
