= Hamler, Ohio =

- Village
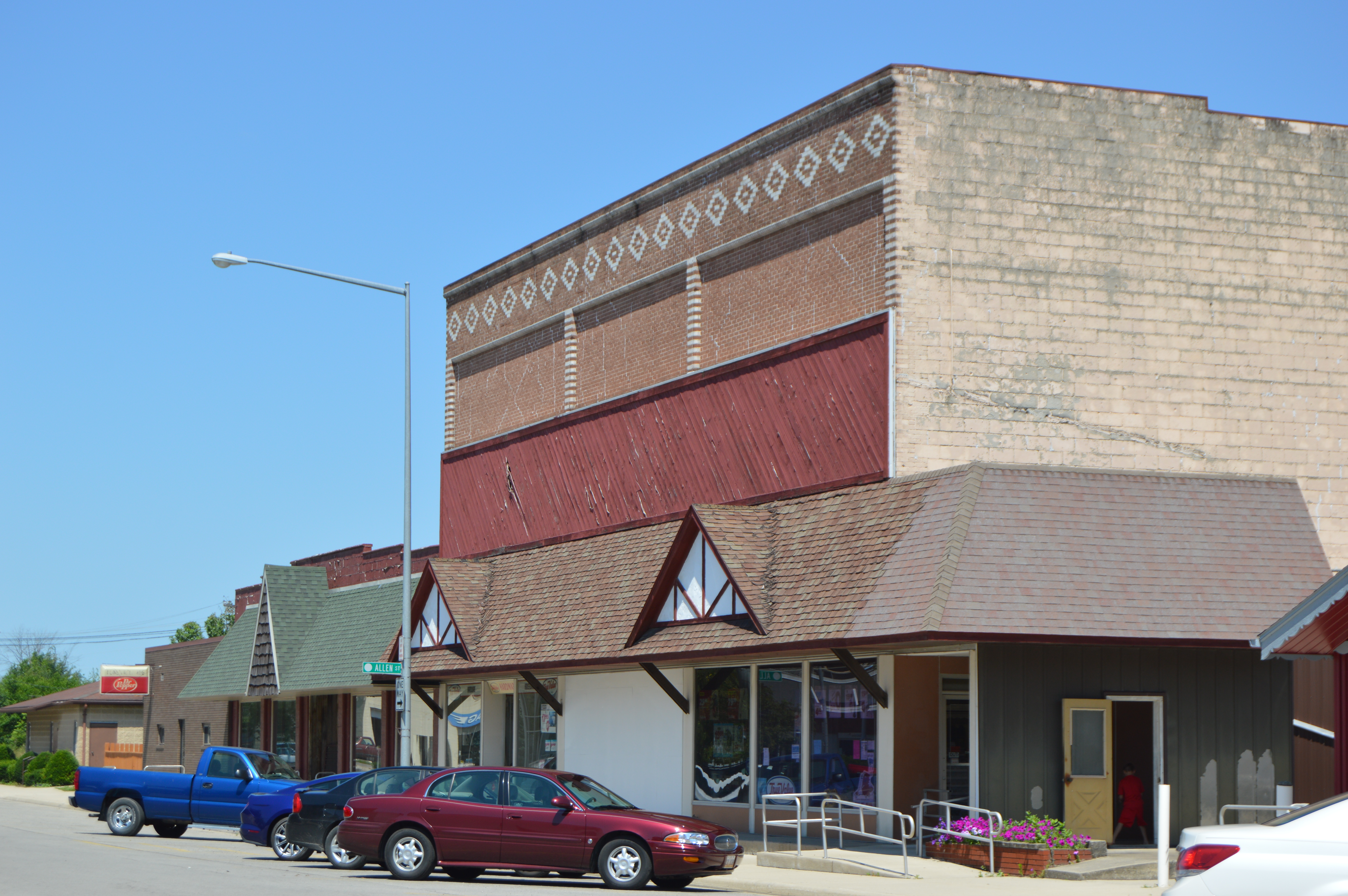
- Randolph Street commercial district

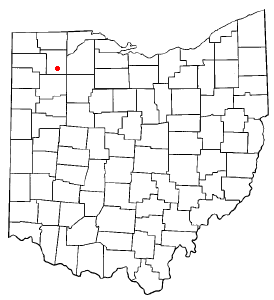
- Location of Hamler, Ohio

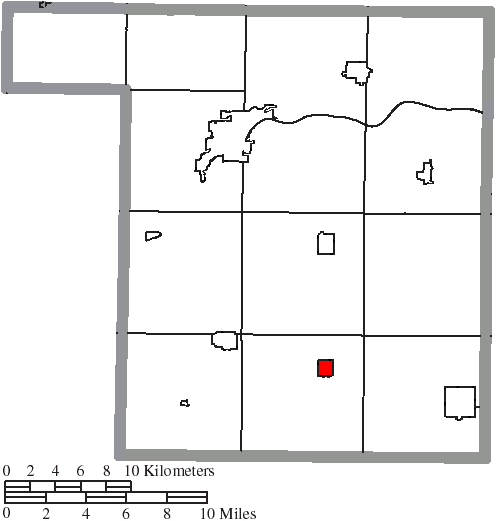
- Location of Hamler in Henry County
- Coordinates: 41°13′41″N 84°02′08″W
- Country: United States
- State: Ohio
- County: Henry

Area
  - Total: 0.83 sq mi (2.15 km^{2})
  - Land: 0.83 sq mi (2.14 km^{2})
  - Water: 0.0039 sq mi (0.01 km^{2})
- Elevation: 709 ft (216 m)

Population (2020)
  - Total: 600
  - Estimate (2023): 604
  - Density: 726.6/sq mi (280.56/km^{2})
- Time zone: UTC-5 (Eastern (EST))
  - Summer (DST): UTC-4 (EDT)
- ZIP code: 43524
- Area code: 419
- FIPS code: 39-33096
- GNIS feature ID: 2398231
- Website: https://hamlerohio.com/

Hamler is a village in Henry County, Ohio, United States. The population was 600 at the 2020 census. Hamler is a rural farming community in Northwest Ohio about 40 miles (64 km) southwest of Toledo, Ohio. It is located at the intersection of the former Baltimore and Ohio (B&O) and former Detroit, Toledo and Ironton (D, T & I) railroads and the intersection of Ohio State Route 109 and Ohio State Route 18.

== History ==
Hamler was platted in 1874. The village was named for its proprietor, John Hamler. A post office has been in operation at Hamler since 1875.

== Geography ==
According to the United States Census Bureau, the village has a total area of 0.81 square miles (2.10 km^{2}), of which 0.80 square miles (2.07 km^{2}) is land and 0.01 square miles (0.03 km^{2}) is water.

== Demographics ==
Historical population
Census	Pop.	Note	%±
1880	231		—
1890	556		140.7%
1900	574		3.2%
1910	596		3.8%
1920	560		−6.0%
1930	535		−4.5%
1940	475		−11.2%
1950	490		3.2%
1960	588		20.0%
1970	681		15.8%
1980	625		−8.2%
1990	623		−0.3%
2000	650		4.3%
2010	576		−11.4%
2020	600		4.2%
2023 (est.)	604	▲	0.7%
U.S. Decennial Census

=== 2010 census ===
As of the census of 2010, there were 576 people, 230 households, and 158 families living in the village. The population density was 720.0 inhabitants per square mile (278.0/km^{2}). There were 258 housing units at an average density of 322.5 per square mile (124.5/km^{2}). The racial makeup of the village was 90.8% White, 0.3% African American, 1.0% Native American, 6.4% from other races, and 1.4% from two or more races. Hispanic or Latino of any race were 21.5% of the population.

There were 230 households, of which 35.7% had children under the age of 18 living with them, 50.9% were married couples living together, 14.3% had a female householder with no husband present, 3.5% had a male householder with no wife present, and 31.3% were non-families. 28.7% of all households were made up of individuals, and 15.6% had someone living alone who was 65 years of age or older. The average household size was 2.50 and the average family size was 3.05.

The median age in the village was 35.6 years. 27.4% of residents were under the age of 18; 11.5% were between the ages of 18 and 24; 22% were from 25 to 44; 22.6% were from 45 to 64; and 16.7% were 65 years of age or older. The gender makeup of the village was 50.0% male and 50.0% female.

=== 2000 census ===
As of the census of 2000, there were 650 people, 236 households, and 173 families living in the village. The population density was 1,137.1 inhabitants per square mile (439.0/km^{2}). There were 254 housing units at an average density of 444.4 per square mile (171.6/km^{2}). The racial makeup of the village was 88.31% White, 0.31% African American, 10.62% from other races, and 0.77% from two or more races. Hispanic or Latino of any race were 20.62% of the population.

There were 236 households, out of which 40.7% had children under the age of 18 living with them, 62.3% were married couples living together, 9.3% had a female householder with no husband present, and 26.3% were non-families. 23.7% of all households were made up of individuals, and 12.3% had someone living alone who was 65 years of age or older. The average household size was 2.75 and the average family size was 3.29.

In the village, the population was spread out, with 31.1% under the age of 18, 7.1% from 18 to 24, 28.9% from 25 to 44, 17.8% from 45 to 64, and 15.1% who were 65 years of age or older. The median age was 31 years. For every 100 females there were 90.6 males. For every 100 females age 18 and over, there were 87.4 males.

The median income for a household in the village was $40,313, and the median income for a family was $43,516. Males had a median income of $35,750 versus $21,333 for females. The per capita income for the village was $16,264. About 5.1% of families and 6.3% of the population were below the poverty line, including 7.4% of those under age 18 and 7.3% of those age 65 or over.

== Arts and culture ==
A village consisting primarily of residents of German heritage, Hamler is home of the annual Hamler Summerfest which features German polka bands, polka dancing and German food.

The Hamler Country Fest is an annual country music festival which occurs in May.

== Education ==
Hamler students attend school in the Patrick Henry Local School District, which is located on Ohio State Route 18. The district is a consolidation of the former school districts of the villages of Hamler, Deshler, Grelton, and Malinta.

== Notable people ==
- Chip Davis, composer and musician
