= Metamora, Ohio =

- Village
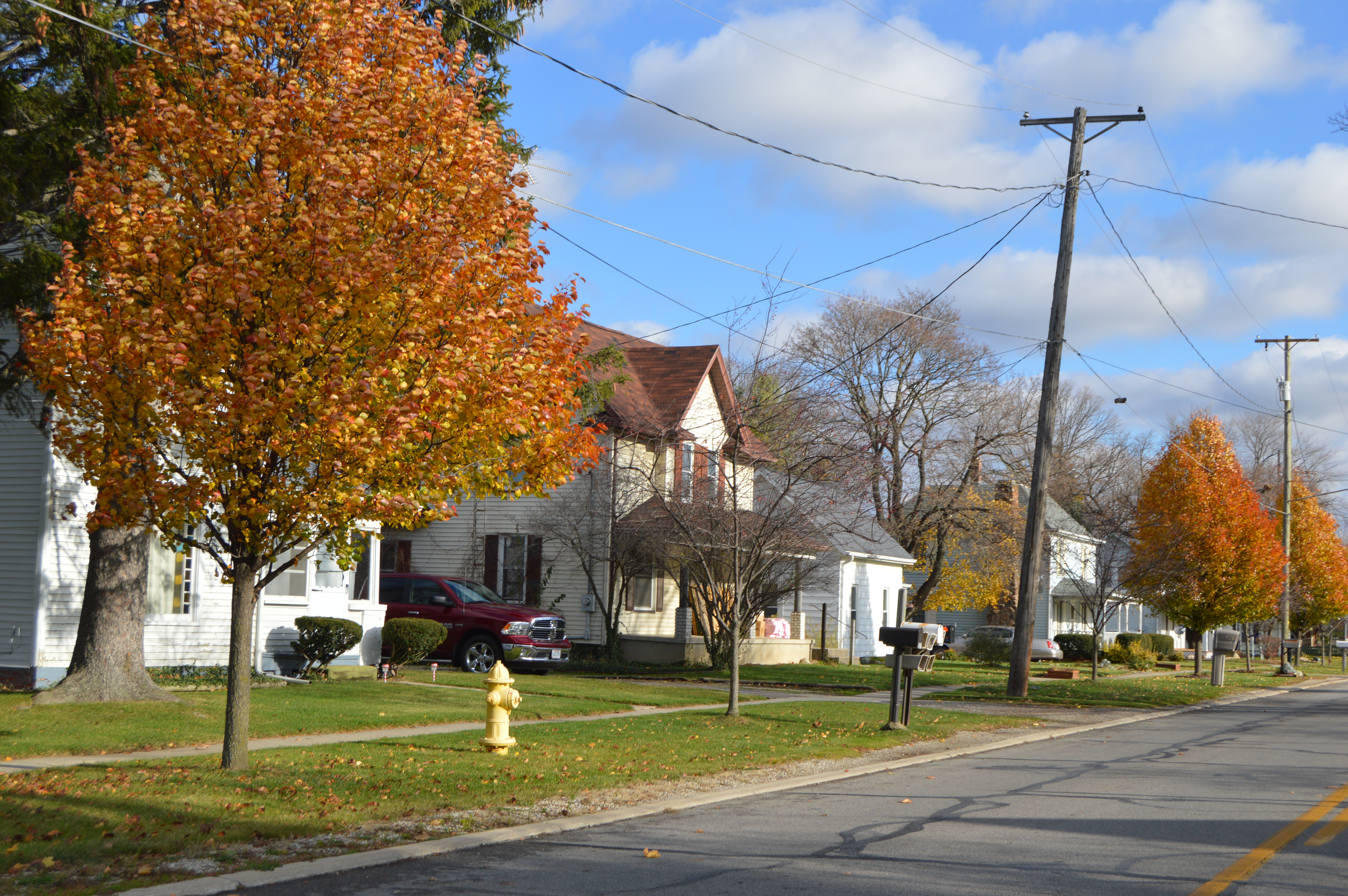
- Maple Street

- Flag Logo

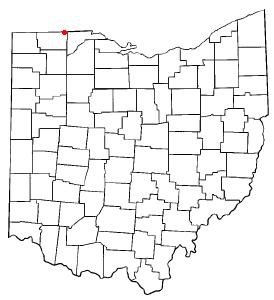
- Location of Metamora, Ohio

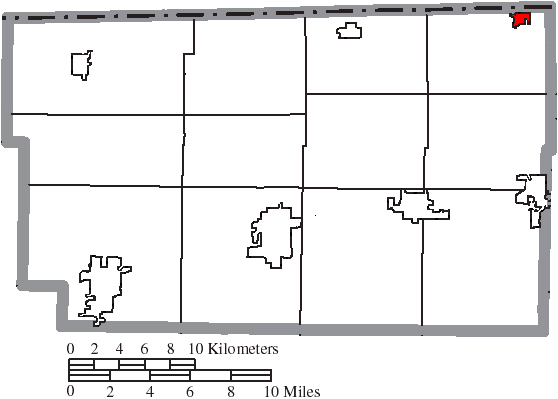
- Location of Metamora in Fulton County
- Coordinates: 41°42′41″N 83°54′20″W
- Country: United States
- State: Ohio
- County: Fulton
- Township: Amboy

Area
  - Total: 0.83 sq mi (2.15 km^{2})
  - Land: 0.82 sq mi (2.12 km^{2})
  - Water: 0.015 sq mi (0.04 km^{2})
- Elevation: 719 ft (219 m)

Population (2020)
  - Total: 566
  - Density: 692.5/sq mi (267.39/km^{2})
- Time zone: UTC-5 (Eastern (EST))
  - Summer (DST): UTC-4 (EDT)
- ZIP code: 43540
- Area code: 419
- FIPS code: 39-49238
- GNIS feature ID: 2399324
- Website: https://www.metamoraohio.org/

Metamora is a village in Fulton County, Ohio, United States. The population was 566 at the 2020 census.

== History ==
The first settlement at Metamora was made in the 1830s. A post office called Metamora has been in operation since 1841.

The name of Metamora is from a very popular 1829 play titled Metamora; or, The Last of the Wampanoags, by John Augustus Stone, that had a stage run over 60 years. This play inspired four new Midwestern towns to adopt the name Metamora — Metamora, Ohio in the 1830s, Metamora Township, Michigan in 1838 after the 1836-37 Toledo War caused the removal of Metamora from Michigan Territory to Ohio, Metamora, Indiana also in 1838, and Metamora, Illinois in 1845.

== Geography ==
According to the United States Census Bureau, the village has a total area of 0.84 square miles (2.18 km^{2}), of which 0.83 square miles (2.15 km^{2}) is land and 0.01 square miles (0.03 km^{2}) is water.

== Demographics ==
Historical population
Census	Pop.	Note	%±
1880	108		—
1900	263		—
1910	475		80.6%
1920	484		1.9%
1930	552		14.0%
1940	490		−11.2%
1950	532		8.6%
1960	598		12.4%
1970	594		−0.7%
1980	556		−6.4%
1990	543		−2.3%
2000	563		3.7%
2010	627		11.4%
2020	566		−9.7%
U.S. Decennial Census

=== 2010 census ===
As of the census of 2010, there were 627 people, 221 households, and 168 families living in the village. The population density was 755.4 inhabitants per square mile (291.7/km^{2}). There were 234 housing units at an average density of 281.9 per square mile (108.8/km^{2}). The racial makeup of the village was 99.2% White, 0.2% Native American, and 0.6% from two or more races. Hispanic or Latino of any race were 2.2% of the population.

There were 221 households, of which 42.1% had children under the age of 18 living with them, 59.7% were married couples living together, 10.9% had a female householder with no husband present, 5.4% had a male householder with no wife present, and 24.0% were non-families. 20.8% of all households were made up of individuals, and 6.8% had someone living alone who was 65 years of age or older. The average household size was 2.84 and the average family size was 3.32.

The median age in the village was 36.9 years. 29.8% of residents were under the age of 18; 8.2% were between the ages of 18 and 24; 24.6% were from 25 to 44; 26.6% were from 45 to 64; and 10.8% were 65 years of age or older. The gender makeup of the village was 49.3% male and 50.7% female.

=== 2000 census ===
As of the census of 2000, there were 563 people, 200 households, and 149 families living in the village. The population density was 1,323.5 inhabitants per square mile (511.0/km^{2}). There were 205 housing units at an average density of 481.9 per square mile (186.1/km^{2}). The racial makeup of the village was 97.87% White, 0.53% African American, 0.18% Native American, 0.71% from other races, and 0.71% from two or more races. Hispanic or Latino of any race were 3.37% of the population.

There were 200 households, out of which 42.5% had children under the age of 18 living with them, 54.5% were married couples living together, 12.0% had a female householder with no husband present, and 25.5% were non-families. 22.0% of all households were made up of individuals, and 10.5% had someone living alone who was 65 years of age or older. The average household size was 2.82 and the average family size was 3.32.

In the village, the population was spread out, with 33.0% under the age of 18, 5.7% from 18 to 24, 30.2% from 25 to 44, 20.4% from 45 to 64, and 10.7% who were 65 years of age or older. The median age was 34 years. For every 100 females there were 101.8 males. For every 100 females age 18 and over, there were 96.4 males.

The median income for a household in the village was $47,750, and the median income for a family was $53,661. Males had a median income of $33,000 versus $24,688 for females. The per capita income for the village was $16,387. About 5.8% of families and 8.5% of the population were below the poverty line, including 11.7% of those under age 18 and 23.5% of those age 65 or over.

== Education ==
Evergreen Local School District administers three schools: Evergreen Elementary School, Evergreen Middle School, and Evergreen High School. The Evergreen Community Library is the village's lending library.
