= Wabash Cannonball Trail =

Rail trail in Ohio, United States

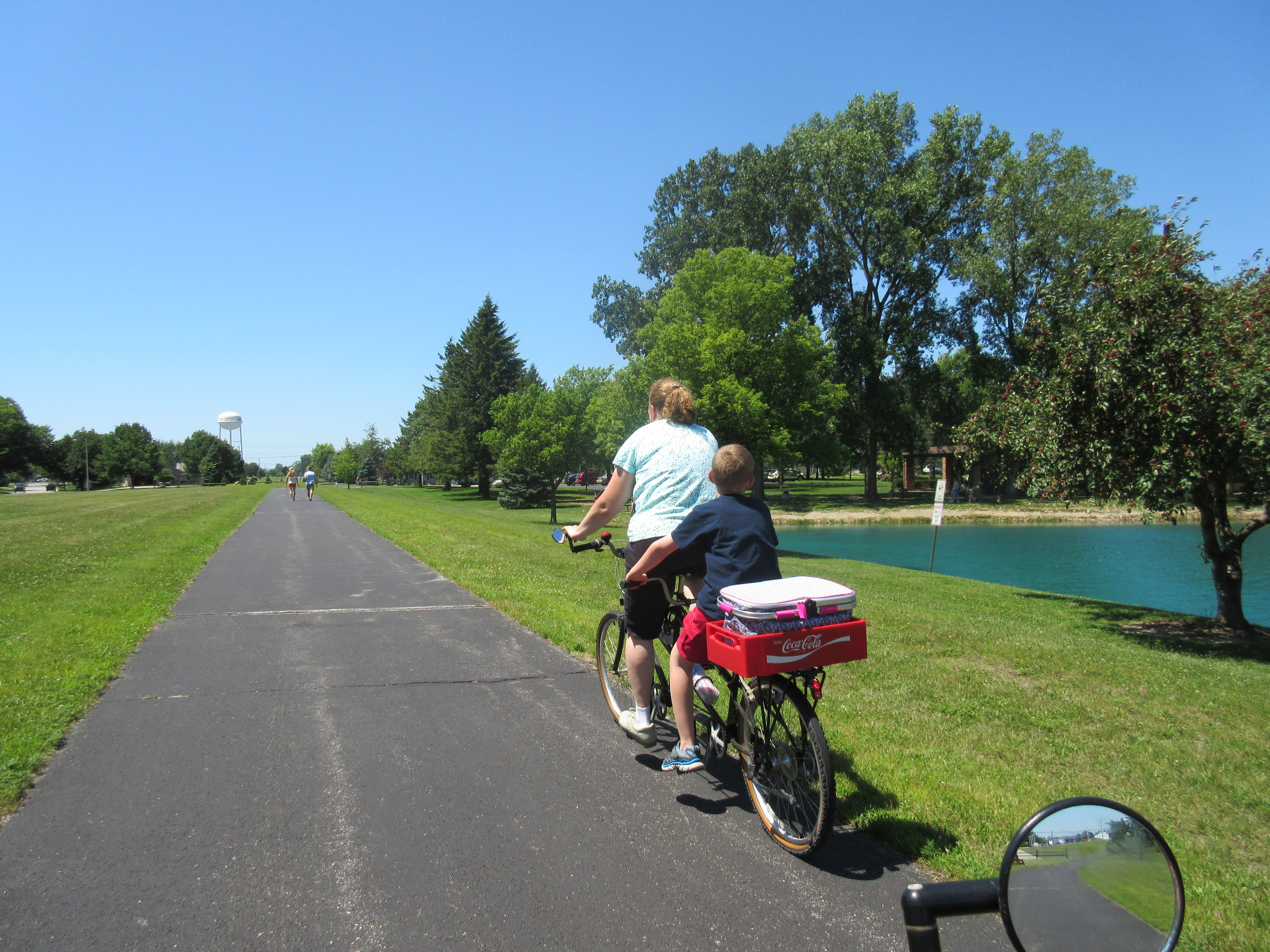
- Westbound tandem with picnic basket at Rotary Park

Rails to Trails
- Length: Williams County: 9 mi. Fulton County: 26 mi. Lucas County: 22 mi. Henry County: 6 mi. Total: 63 miles
- Location: Northwest Ohio; United States
- Established: 1995
- Designation: North Country National Scenic Trail
- Trailheads: Parking available in all counties
- Use: Hiking, bicycling, cross country skiing, equestrian
- Highest point: 879 feet (268 m)
- Lowest point: 640 feet (200 m)
- Grade: flat to gentle railroad grades
- Difficulty: Wheelchair accessible
- Months: 12
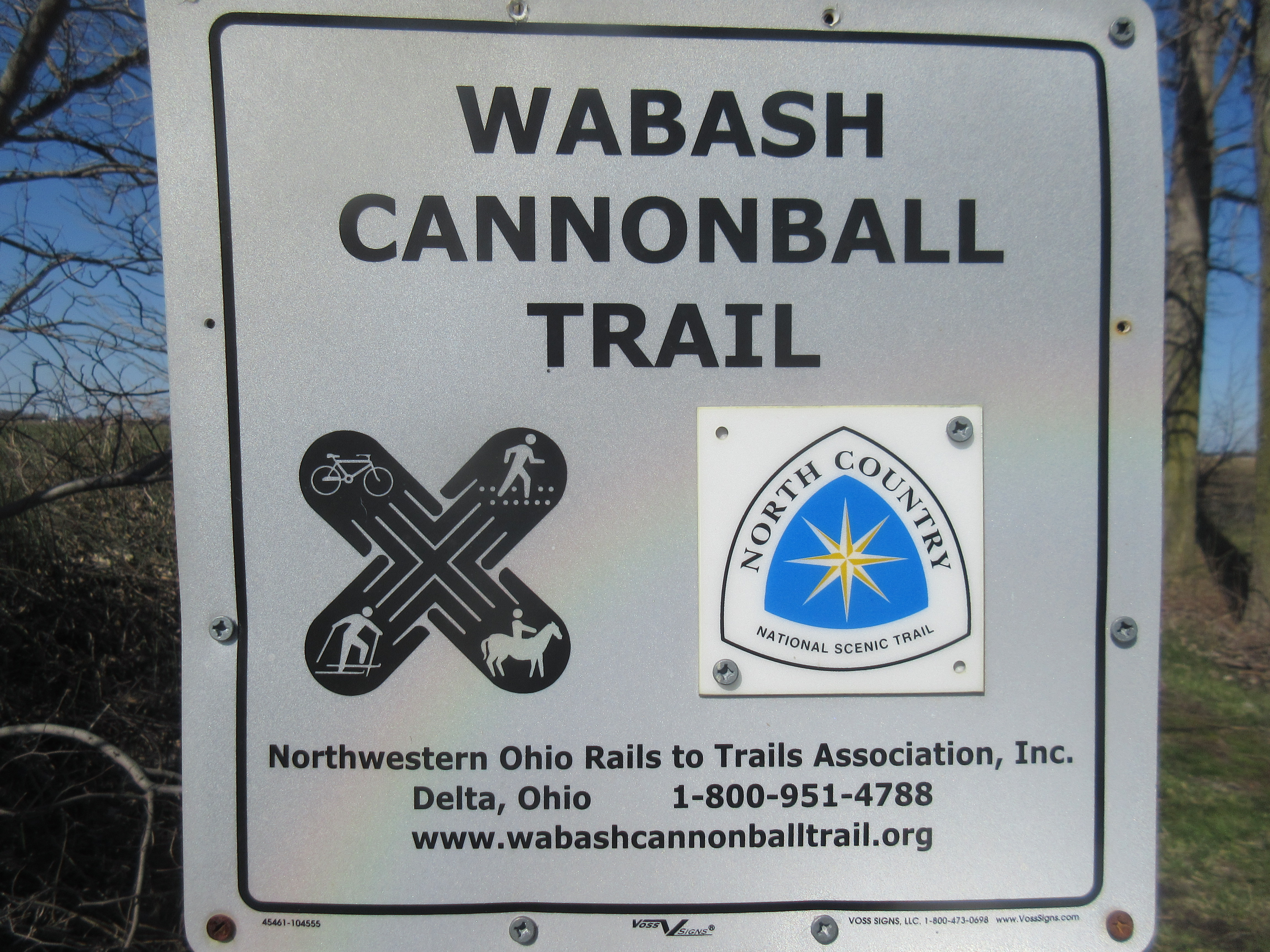
- Waymark
- Sights: Oak Openings Preserve Metropark; Fraker Mill Covered Bridge; Wabash Railroad caboose
- Hazards: US and State Route crossings
- Surface: Lucas County: all paved Fulton County: 6 miles paved remainder: gravel
- Right of way: Wabash Railroad
- Website: http://wabashcannonballtrail.org

The Wabash Cannonball Trail is a rail to trail conversion in northwestern Ohio, U.S. It is 63 miles (101 km) long. The North Fork of the Wabash Cannonball Trail is part of the North Coast Inland Trail, which plans to fully connect Indiana to Pennsylvania, and portions of the trail are included in the North Country National Scenic Trail.

== History ==
The Wabash Railroad line used by the trail was first built in 1855, and service continued until 1969. The Norfolk Southern Railway then purchased it. The rails were finally abandoned in 1990. Local enthusiasts developed the idea of creating a public recreational trail and utility corridor. On March 24, 1994, the corridor was purchased from Norfolk Southern.

The name Wabash Cannonball stems from an 1882 American folk song about an imaginary train. No train actually had the name until 1949, when the Wabash Railroad actually named its Detroit-St. Louis day train the Cannon Ball.

Other rail-to-trail conversions of the Wabash Railroad in the Midwestern region include the Kiwanis Trail in Adrian, Michigan, the Wabash Heritage Trail in West Lafayette, Indiana, and the Wabash Trail in Sangamon County, Illinois.

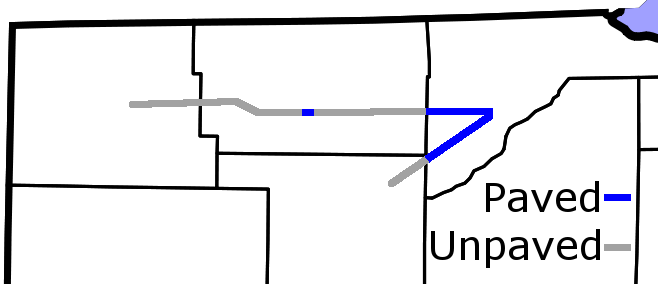
North Fork and South Fork of Wabash Cannonball Trail

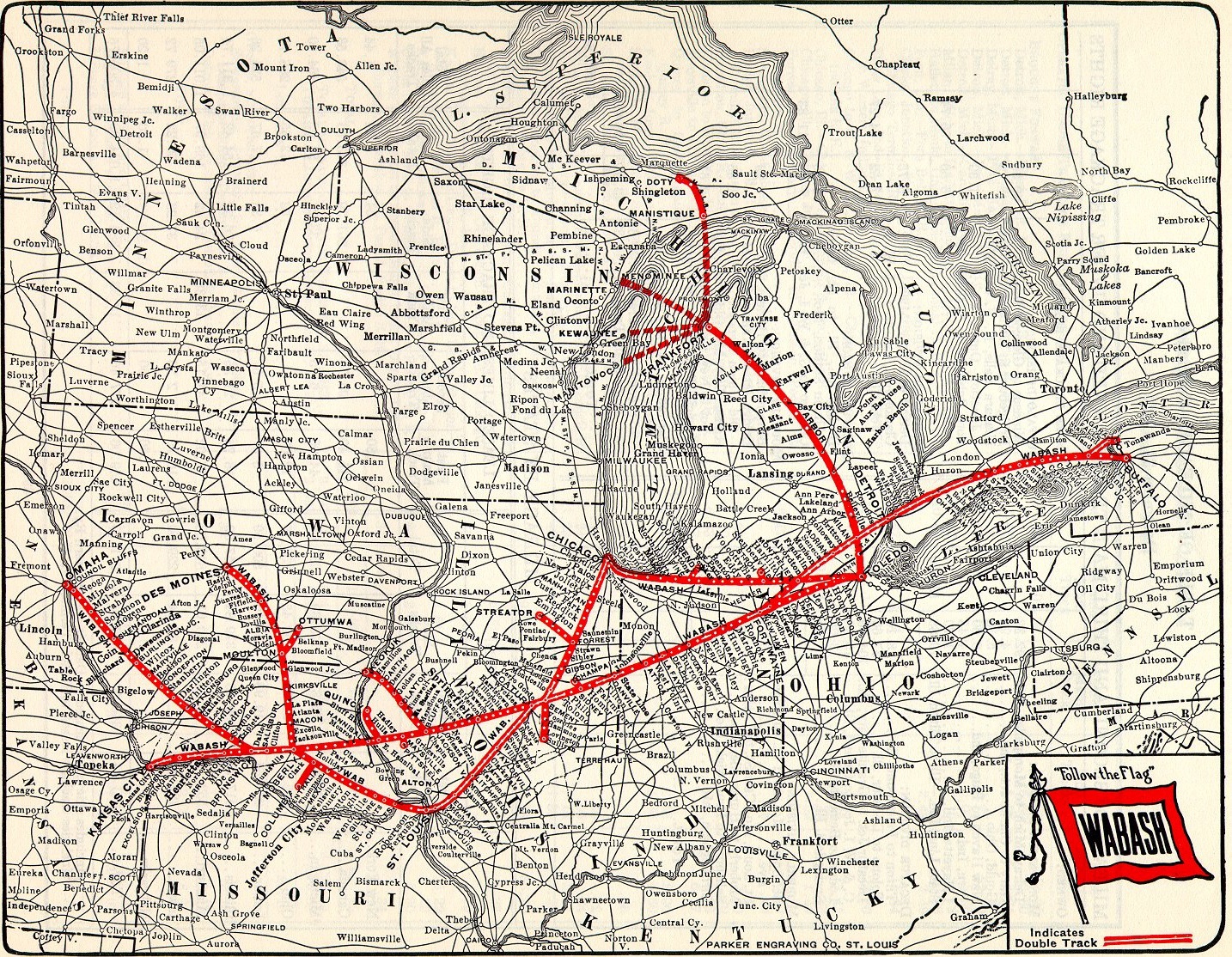
Wabash Railroad map, showing North and South Forks of the trail in Ohio

== Location ==
=== North Fork ===
The northern section of the trail roughly parallels both the Ohio Turnpike I-80/90 and US Route 20A for about 43 miles (69 km) starting in Maumee, and extending through Monclova, Wauseon, and West Unity, ending at its western trailhead near Montpelier, Ohio.

=== South Fork ===
An additional 18-mile (29 km) spur runs from Maumee southwest to near Liberty Center, Ohio. That trailhead has a parking area near Whitehouse, Ohio.

=== Condition ===
All portions of the trail in Lucas County are paved. A 2-mile (3.2 km) section of the trail in Fulton County, owned by the city of Wauseon, also is paved. The remainder of the North Fork in Fulton and Williams counties are unpaved, as is the South Fork in Henry County.

Trail section	County	Township	Distance		Surface	Crossings	Notes
Trail section	County	Township	(mi)	(km)	Surface	Crossings	Notes
North Fork North Fork North Fork	Lucas	Monclova	0	0	Paved	Jerome Road	Eastern Terminus, near The Fallen Timbers Battlefield and Fort Miamis National Historic Site, Maumee, parking available. 41.556741°N 83.699396°W
North Fork North Fork North Fork	Lucas	Monclova	0.2	0.32	Paved	Fork branches South	
North Fork North Fork North Fork	Lucas	Monclova	1.7	2.7	Paved	Waterville-Monclova Road	Parking in Village of Monclova, Ohio. 41.556656°N 83.732709°W
North Fork North Fork North Fork	Lucas	Monclova	2.7	4.3	Paved	Keener Road	Monclova Township Hall, with parking, bathrooms, and a bicycle maintenance station. 41.556633°N 83.752493°W
North Fork North Fork North Fork	Lucas	Swanton	6.5	10.5	Paved	SR 295	41.556459°N 83.824994°W
North Fork North Fork North Fork	Lucas	Swanton	7.3	11.7	Paved	Evergreen Lake Trail	Oak Openings Preserve Metropark trail. 41.556390°N 83.840066°W Bathrooms and parking located one mile south at Ranger Station. 41.543583°N 83.840345°W
North Fork North Fork North Fork	Lucas	Swanton	9.0	14.5	Paved	SR 64	Oak Openings Preserve Metropark bathrooms and parking. 41.556333°N 83.873230°W
North Fork North Fork North Fork	Fulton	Swan Creek	15.2	24.5	Cinder, gravel, dirt, grass	Fraker Mill Covered Bridge	Crosses Bad Creek, near Delta 41.5547649°N 83.9990659°W
North Fork North Fork North Fork	Fulton	York	15.5	24.9	Cinder, gravel, dirt, grass	SR 109	Parking. NORTA (Northwestern Ohio Rails-to-Trails Association) offices. Bathrooms available in Delta. 41.555918°N 84.001243°W
North Fork North Fork North Fork	Fulton	York	19.5	31.4	Cinder, gravel, dirt, grass	County Road 11	Two mile detour on County Road F, from County Road 11 to County Road 13 41.555557°N 84.076304°W
North Fork North Fork North Fork	Fulton	Clinton	21.5	34.6	Paved	County Road 13	Paved trail maintained by City of Wauseon Parks. 41.555369°N 84.114888°W
North Fork North Fork North Fork	Fulton	Clinton	22.5	36.2	Paved	SR 108	Busy crossing 41.555384°N 84.134416°W
North Fork North Fork North Fork	Fulton	Clinton	22.7	36.5	Paved	Rotary Park, Wauseon	Parking 41.555336°N 84.139115°W
North Fork North Fork North Fork	Fulton	Clinton	23.5	37.8	Paved	Automotive Parts Factory	Pavement ends. 41.555284°N 84.152587°W One mile detour on County Road F via Krieger St.
North Fork North Fork North Fork	Fulton	Clinton	24.5	39.4	Cinder, gravel, dirt, grass	County Road 16	Detour to County Road F. 41.555125°N 84.172869°W
North Fork North Fork North Fork	Fulton	German	30.4	48.9	Cinder, gravel, dirt, grass	US 20A	41.572404°N 84.282744°W
North Fork North Fork North Fork	Fulton	German	32.8	52.8	Cinder, gravel, dirt, grass	County Road 23 (old SR 66)	Parking in Elmira/Burlington. 41.579305°N 84.306980°W
North Fork North Fork North Fork	Fulton	German	33.3	53.6	Cinder, gravel, dirt, grass	Tiffin River bridge.	Large railroad bridge north of Archbold. 41.583054°N 84.335466°W
North Fork North Fork North Fork	Fulton	German	33.6	54.1	Cinder, gravel, dirt, grass	US 20A	41.582987°N 84.341297°W
North Fork North Fork North Fork	Williams	Brady	38.3	61.6	Cinder, gravel, dirt, grass	Wabash Park, West Unity	Parking and bathrooms. 41.583068°N 84.431586°W
North Fork North Fork North Fork	Williams	Jefferson	38.7	62.3	Cinder, gravel, dirt, grass	US 127	41.583116°N 84.439879°W
North Fork North Fork North Fork	Williams	Jefferson	44.7	71.9	Cinder, gravel, dirt, grass	SR 15	Western Terminus, near Montpelier, parking. 41.58308°N 84.55563°W Bathrooms available in Montpelier
South Fork	Lucas	Monclova	0	0	Paved	Jerome Road	Eastern Terminus, near The Fallen Timbers Battlefield and Fort Miamis National Historic Site, Maumee. Parking available.
South Fork	Lucas	Monclova	0.2	0.32	Paved	Forks branch	41.556745°N 83.703956°W
South Fork	Lucas	Monclova	0.8	1.3	Paved	The Shops at Fallen Timbers	41.551229°N 83.709202°W
South Fork	Lucas	Providence	6.2	10.0	Paved	SR 64, White House	Parking and bathrooms available. Bicycle repair shop. 41.517989°N 83.803102°W
South Fork	Lucas	Providence	7.5	12.1	Paved	SR 295	41.509384°N 83.827107°W
South Fork	Lucas	Providence	10.2	16.4	Paved	Neapolis	Parking available. 41.492799°N 83.873352°W
South Fork	Henry	Washington	14.7	23.7	Cinder, gravel, dirt, grass	Colton	Parking available. 41.464363°N 83.952668°W
South Fork	Henry	Washington	16.9	27.2	Cinder, gravel, dirt, grass	County Road 6C	Western Terminus end, Near Liberty Center 41.451114°N 83.989429°W

Note that distance information about the trail differs slightly from one source to another based on whether missing sections of the trail are counted or not. Some sources say the north fork is 43 miles (69 km) (not counting missing sections), others say 45 miles (72 km) (counting the missing sections), and still others 47 miles (76 km) (counting detour mileage).
