= National Register of Historic Places listings in Fulton County, Ohio =

Location of Fulton County in Ohio

This is a list of the National Register of Historic Places listings in Fulton County, Ohio.

It is intended to be a complete list of the properties on the National Register of Historic Places in Fulton County, Ohio, United States. The locations of National Register properties for which the latitude and longitude coordinates are included below, may be seen in an online map.

There are 7 properties listed on the National Register in the county.

This National Park Service list is complete through NPS recent listings posted March 14, 2025.

== Current listings ==
	Name on the Register	Image	Date listed	Location	City or town	Description
1	George S. Clement House	George S. Clement House	April 21, 1983 (#83001973)	137 Clinton St. 41°32′57″N 84°08′35″W	Wauseon	
2	Fulton County Courthouse	Fulton County Courthouse	May 7, 1973 (#73001447)	S. Fulton and Chestnut Sts. 41°32′46″N 84°08′27″W	Wauseon	
3	Fulton Lodge No. 248	Fulton Lodge No. 248	February 18, 2021 (#100006149)	401 1/2 Main St. 41°34′27″N 84°00′20″W	Delta	
4	Goll Homestead	Goll Homestead	October 26, 2005 (#05001185)	26093 Township Road F northwest of Archbold; 41°33′22″N 84°21′51″W	German Township	
5	Jones-Read-Touvelle House	Jones-Read-Touvelle House	May 8, 1987 (#87000632)	435 E. Park St. 41°32′35″N 84°08′22″W	Wauseon	
6	Lake Shore and Michigan Southern (LS&MS) Railroad Depot-Wauseon	Lake Shore and Michigan Southern (LS&MS) Railroad Depot-Wauseon	March 11, 1993 (#93000151)	Southern side of Depot St., between Fulton and Brunell Sts. 41°32′50″N 84°08′13″W	Wauseon	
7	Winameg Mounds	Winameg Mounds	December 31, 1974 (#74001500)	South of Winameg on the northern banks of Bad Creek; 41°37′17″N 84°04′04″W	Pike Township	

== See also ==
- List of National Historic Landmarks in Ohio
- Listings in neighboring counties: Henry, Hillsdale (MI), Lenawee (MI), Lucas, Williams
- National Register of Historic Places listings in Ohio
