= Anthony Wayne Local School District =

School district in Ohio

Address
- 9565 Bucher Road Whitehouse, Ohio, 43571; United States
- Coordinates: 41°31′16″N 83°48′4″W

District information
- Type: Public
- Grades: KG–12
- Schools: 6
- NCES District ID: 3904820

Students and staff
- Students: 4,135 (2025–2026)
- Teachers: 209.29 (on an FTE basis) (2025–2026)
- Staff: 289.17 (on an FTE basis) (2025–2026)
- Student–teacher ratio: 19.76 (2025–2026)

Other information
- Website: anthonywayneschools.org

Anthony Wayne Local School District is a school district in Northwest Ohio. The school district serves students who live in the municipalities of Whitehouse and Waterville, and in Monclova Township; it also serves students in parts of Providence Township and Swanton Township in Lucas County, and Middleton Township in Wood County. The superintendent is Dr. Jim Fritz.

== History ==
The Anthony Wayne Local School District was established in 1950 through the consolidation of three school boards; Monclova, Waterville, and Whitehouse.

In 2023 the district proposed a school bond, but voters rejected the bond.

== District boundary ==
In Lucas County, the district includes, Neapolis, Waterville, Whitehouse, and portions of Maumee. The school district extends into Wood County.

== Schools ==
Secondary

- Anthony Wayne High School (Grades 9–12)
- Anthony Wayne Junior High School (Grades 7–8)

Middle schools (upper primary)

- Fallen Timbers Middle School (Grades 5–6)

Grades K-4 (lower primary)

- Monclova Primary
- Waterville Primary
- Whitehouse Primary
