= Clinton Township, Fulton County, Ohio =

Township in Ohio, US

- Township
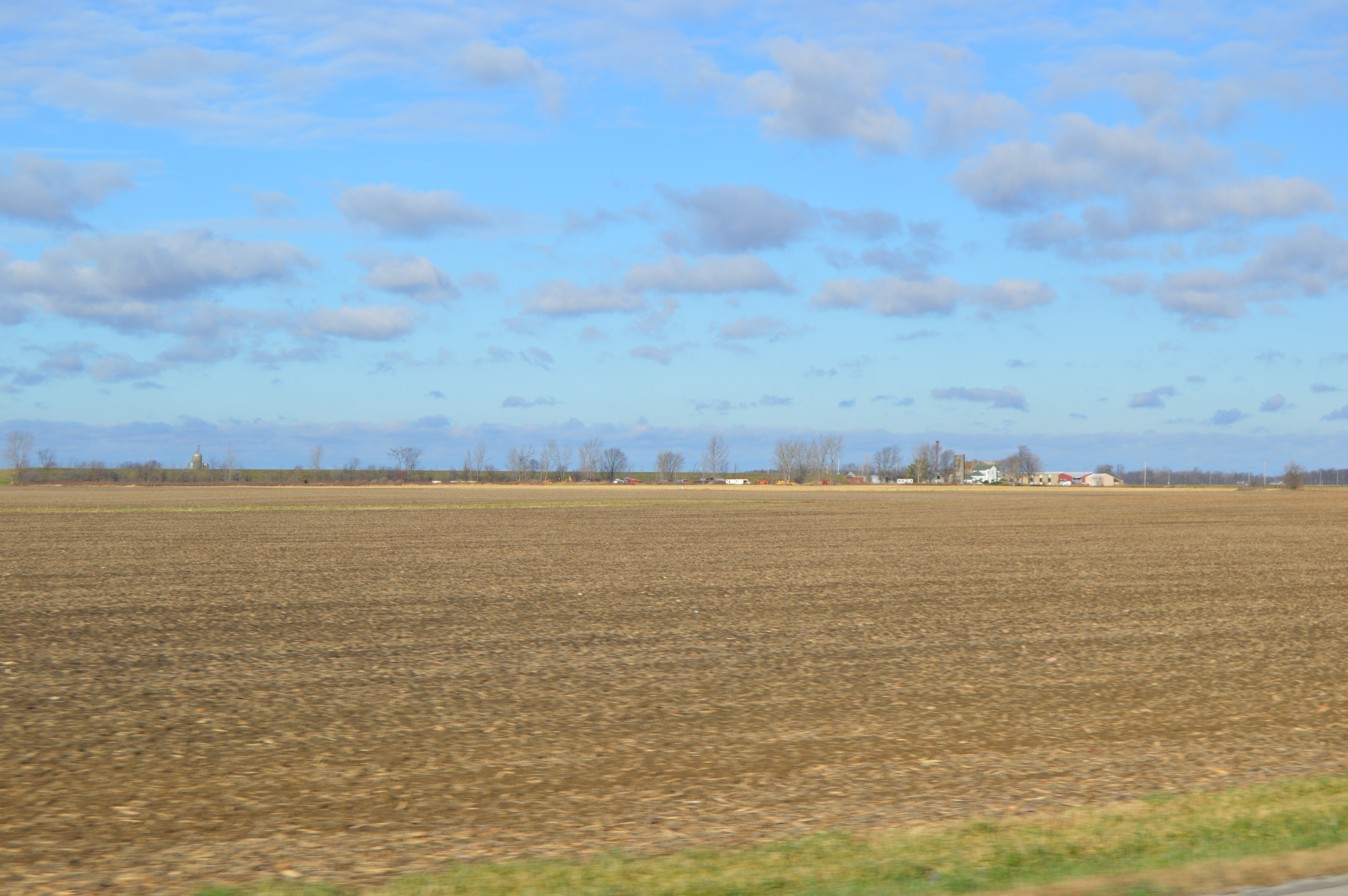
- Fields on State Route 108, south of Wauseon

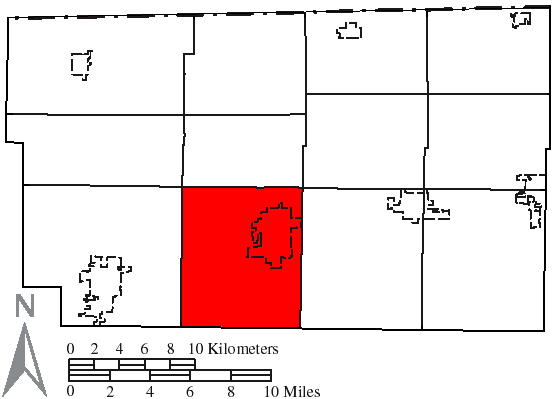
- Location of Clinton Township in Fulton County
- Coordinates: 41°32′43″N 84°9′22″W
- Country: United States
- State: Ohio
- County: Fulton

Area
  - Total: 41.6 sq mi (107.8 km^{2})
  - Land: 41.5 sq mi (107.6 km^{2})
  - Water: 0.077 sq mi (0.2 km^{2})
- Elevation: 771 ft (235 m)

Population (2020)
  - Total: 9,630
  - Density: 232/sq mi (89.5/km^{2})
- Time zone: UTC-5 (Eastern (EST))
  - Summer (DST): UTC-4 (EDT)
- FIPS code: 39-16126
- GNIS feature ID: 1086122
- Website: https://www.clintontownshipfultoncounty.com/

Clinton Township is one of the twelve townships of Fulton County, Ohio, United States. The 2020 census found 9,630 people in the township.

== Geography ==
Located in the southern part of the county, it borders the following townships:

- Dover Township - north
- Pike Township - northeast corner
- York Township - east
- Liberty Township, Henry County - southeast corner
- Freedom Township, Henry County - south
- Ridgeville Township, Henry County - southwest corner
- German Township - west
- Franklin Township - northwest corner

The city of Wauseon, the county seat of Fulton County, is located in eastern Clinton Township, and the census-designated place of Pettisville lies in the township's west.

== Name and history ==
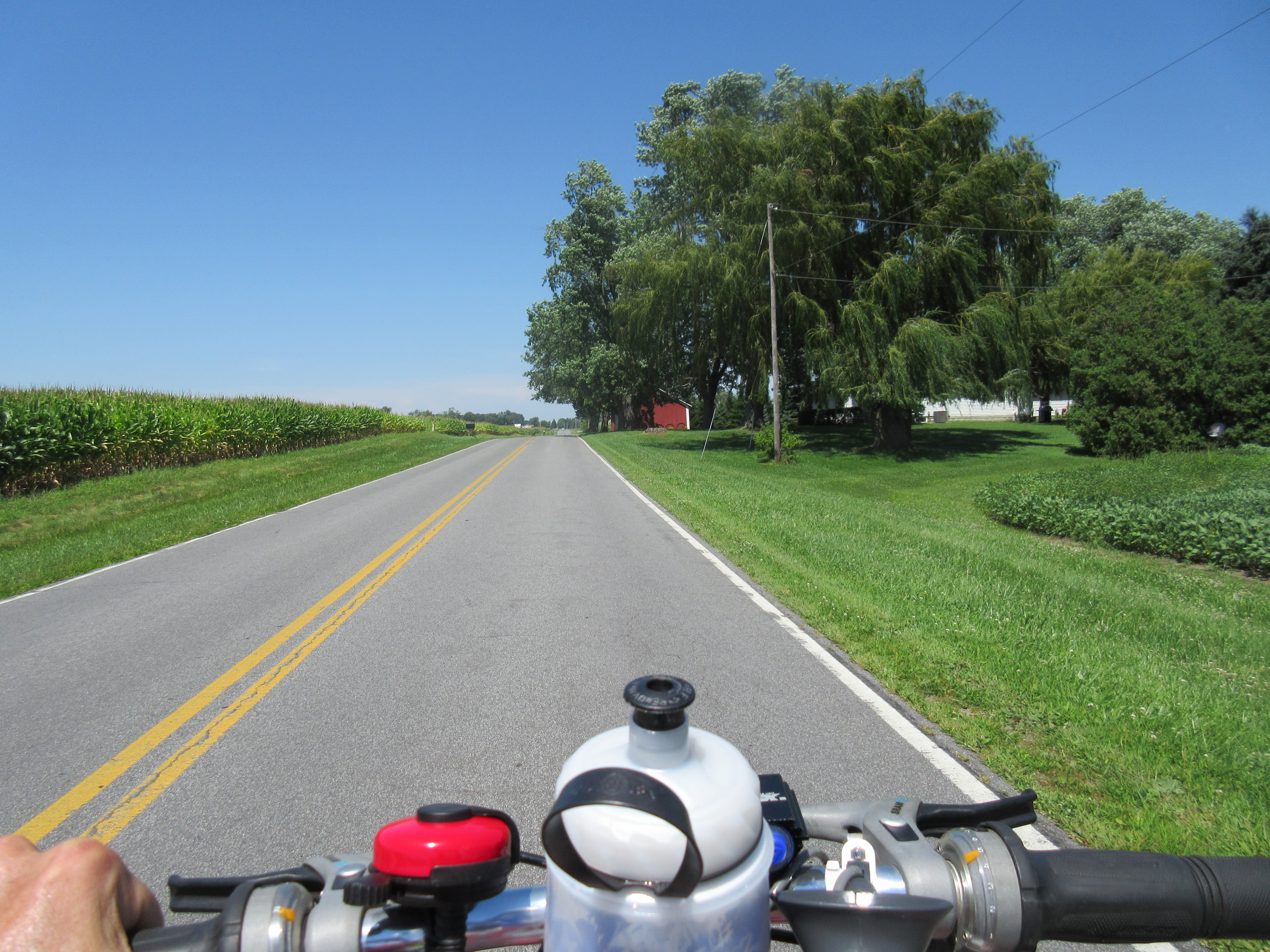
Rural scenery on County Road 16

It is one of seven Clinton Townships statewide.

== Government ==
The township is governed by a three-member board of trustees, who are elected in November of odd-numbered years to a four-year term beginning on the following January 1. Two are elected in the year after the presidential election and one is elected in the year before it. There is also an elected township fiscal officer, who serves a four-year term beginning on April 1 of the year after the election, which is held in November of the year before the presidential election. Vacancies in the fiscal officership or on the board of trustees are filled by the remaining trustees.

== Attractions ==
A 2-mile paved section of the Wabash Cannonball Trail is in the city of Wauseon.

== Public services ==
=== Public Schools ===
Students from the township are served by the following public local school districts:

- Pettisville Local School District
- Wauseon Exempted Village School District

=== Mail ===
Mail is delivered in the township by the following U.S. Post Office locations:

- Napoleon, Ohio 43545
- Pettisville, Ohio 43553
- Wauseon, Ohio 43567

=== Telephone ===
Most of the township is within the Wauseon telephone exchange, which is served by UTO (United Telephone Company of Ohio,) doing business as CenturyLink, with telephone numbers using the following Numbering Plan Codes:

- 419–330
- 419–335
- 419–337
- 419–388
- 419–404
- 419–583
- 419–590

Pettisville and an area south of that are served by the Archbold telephone exchange, which is delivered by UTO (United Telephone Company of Ohio,) doing business as CenturyLink, with telephone numbers using the following Numbering Plan Codes:

- 419–220
- 419–403
- 419–445
- 419–446
- 419–572
- 567–444

A small section of the area where County Road AC and County Road 16 intersect is in the Gerald telephone exchange, delivered by UTO (United Telephone Company of Ohio,) doing business as CenturyLink, with the following codes:

- 419–431
- 419–598
- 567–340

A short section of County Road AC is served by the Ridgeville Corners telephone exchange:

- 419–267
- 419–374

=== Electric ===
Toledo Edison serves the township with electricity.

=== Highways ===
- US 20A
- SR 2
- SR 108

=== Fire and Emergency Medical ===
Dover Township contracts with the Wauseon Fire Department and Fulton County's Emergency Medical Services (EMS) Department located in Wauseon, Ohio.
