= German Township, Fulton County, Ohio =

Township in Ohio, US

- Township
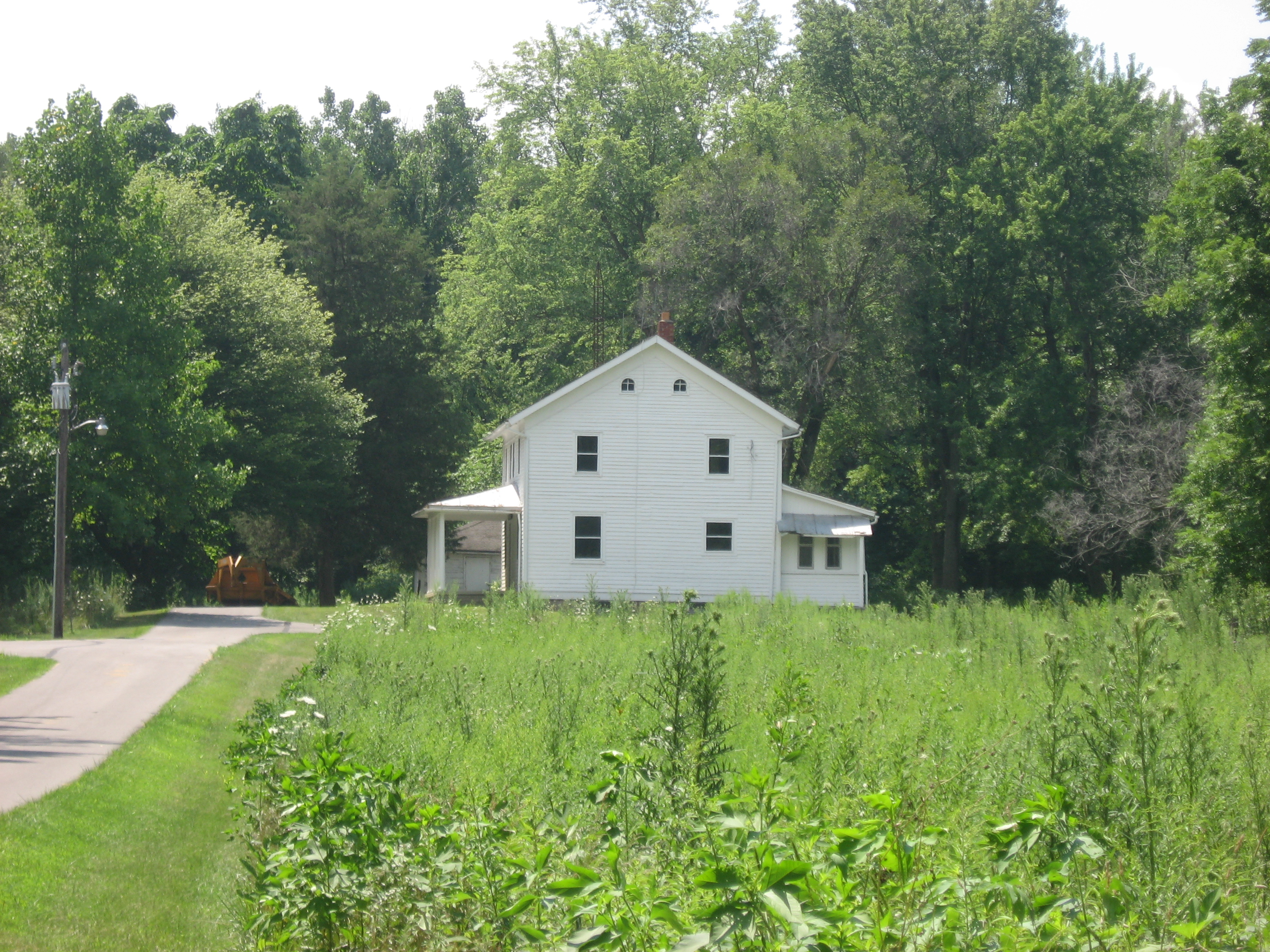
- The Goll Homestead, a historic site in the township

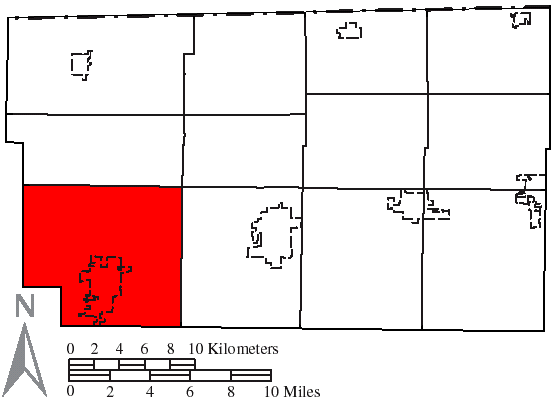
- Location of German Township in Fulton County
- Coordinates: 41°31′51″N 84°18′27″W
- Country: United States
- State: Ohio
- County: Fulton

Area
  - Total: 50.8 sq mi (131.6 km^{2})
  - Land: 50.7 sq mi (131.4 km^{2})
  - Water: 0.077 sq mi (0.2 km^{2})
- Elevation: 728 ft (222 m)

Population (2020)
  - Total: 6,576
  - Density: 129.6/sq mi (50.05/km^{2})
- Time zone: UTC-5 (Eastern (EST))
  - Summer (DST): UTC-4 (EDT)
- FIPS code: 39-29876
- GNIS feature ID: 1086126

German Township is one of the twelve townships in Fulton County, Ohio, United States. The 2020 census found 6,576 people in the township.

== Geography ==
Located in the southwestern corner of the county, it borders the following townships:

- Franklin Township - north
- Dover Township - northeast corner
- Clinton Township - east
- Freedom Township, Henry County - southeast corner
- Ridgeville Township, Henry County - south
- Springfield Township, Williams County - southwest
- Brady Township, Williams County - west

The village of Archbold is located in southern German Township.

The fake town of Beatosu was inserted into the 1978-79 Michigan state map of the township as a joke.

== Name and history ==
It is one of five German Townships statewide.

== Government ==
The township is governed by a three-member board of trustees, who are elected in November of odd-numbered years to a four-year term beginning on the following January 1. Two are elected in the year after the presidential election and one is elected in the year before it. There is also an elected township fiscal officer, who serves a four-year term beginning on April 1 of the year after the election, which is held in November of the year before the presidential election. Vacancies in the fiscal officership or on the board of trustees are filled by the remaining trustees.

== Attractions ==
The Goll Woods State Nature Preserve northwest of Archbold, beside the Tiffin River, is located in the township. Built in the 1860s and 1870s, the Goll Homestead is listed on the National Register of Historic Places.

== Public services ==
=== Public Schools ===
Students from the township are served by the following public local school districts:

- Archbold Area Local School District
- Pettisville Local School District

=== Mail ===
Mail is delivered in the township by the following U.S. Post Office locations:

- Archbold, Ohio 43502
- Stryker, Ohio 43557
- Wauseon, Ohio 43567

=== Telephone ===
All of the township is within the Archbold telephone exchange, which is served by UTO (United Telephone Company of Ohio,) doing business as CenturyLink, with telephone numbers using the following Numbering Plan Codes:

- 419-220
- 419-403
- 419-445
- 419-446
- 419-572
- 567-444

=== Electric ===
Toledo Edison serves most of the township with electricity, with Midwest Energy Cooperative providing it to a small area around the Tiffin River north of and west of Goll Woods.

=== Highways ===
- US 20A
- SR 2
- SR 66
