= Tiffin River Wildlife Area =

- Location within Ohio
- Location: Fulton County, Ohio, United States
- Coordinates: 41°36′20″N 84°18′42″W
- Area: 465 acres (188 ha)
- Named for: Tiffin River
- Governing body: Ohio Department of Natural Resources Division of Parks and Recreation
- Website: Ohio Department of Natural Resources - Tiffin River Wildlife Area

Tiffin River Wildlife Area is a non-contiguous 465-acre (188 ha) State Wildlife Management Area on Ohio State Route 66 in western Fulton County, Ohio between Fayette, Ohio and Archbold, Ohio. Hunting is allowed, and the Ohio DNR has released pheasants for hunting in the area. There is a parking lot off County Road 23.
