= Goll =

Goll may refer to:

- Goll (surname)
- Goll, Wisconsin
- Goll mac Morna, a character from Irish mythology
- Goll, son of Garbh, of the Fomorians, sea demons from Irish mythology who subjugated early Ireland.
- Göll, one of the minor Valkyries of Norse mythology
