= Pettisville, Ohio =

- Census-designated place
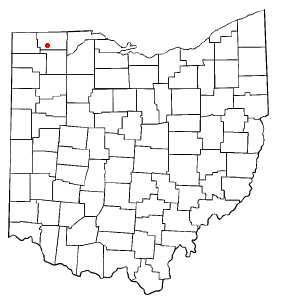
- Location of Pettisville in Ohio
- Coordinates: 41°31′56″N 84°13′23″W
- Country: United States
- State: Ohio
- County: Fulton
- Townships: Clinton, German

Area
  - Total: 0.95 sq mi (2.47 km^{2})
  - Land: 0.95 sq mi (2.46 km^{2})
  - Water: 0 sq mi (0.00 km^{2})
- Elevation: 751 ft (229 m)

Population (2020)
  - Total: 469
  - Density: 492.9/sq mi (190.31/km^{2})
- Time zone: UTC-5 (Eastern (EST))
  - Summer (DST): UTC-4 (EDT)
- ZIP code: 43553
- FIPS code: 39-62344
- GNIS feature ID: 2628952

Pettisville is an unincorporated community and census-designated place (CDP) in Clinton and German Townships, Fulton County, Ohio, United States. The population was 469 at the 2020 census.

== History ==
Pettisville was laid out in 1857, and most likely was named for one Mr. Pettis, a local railroad contractor. A post office was also established in Pettisville in 1857.

== Geography ==
Pettisville is in southwestern Fulton County, with the eastern portion of the community in Clinton Township and the western portion in German Township. Via County Road 19 it is 0.8 miles (1.3 km) north to Ohio State Route 2, which leads east 5 miles (8 km) to Wauseon, the Fulton County seat. Archbold is 5 miles (8 km) west of Pettisville via County Road D. According to the U.S. Census Bureau, the Pettisville CDP has an area of 0.97 square miles (2.5 km^{2}).

== Demographics ==
Historical population
| Census | Pop. | Note | %± |
|---|---|---|---|
| 2020 | 469 | | — |
U.S. Decennial Census

== Notable people ==
- Girl Named Tom, folk trio
