= Waterville Township, Lucas County, Ohio =

Township in Ohio, US

- Township
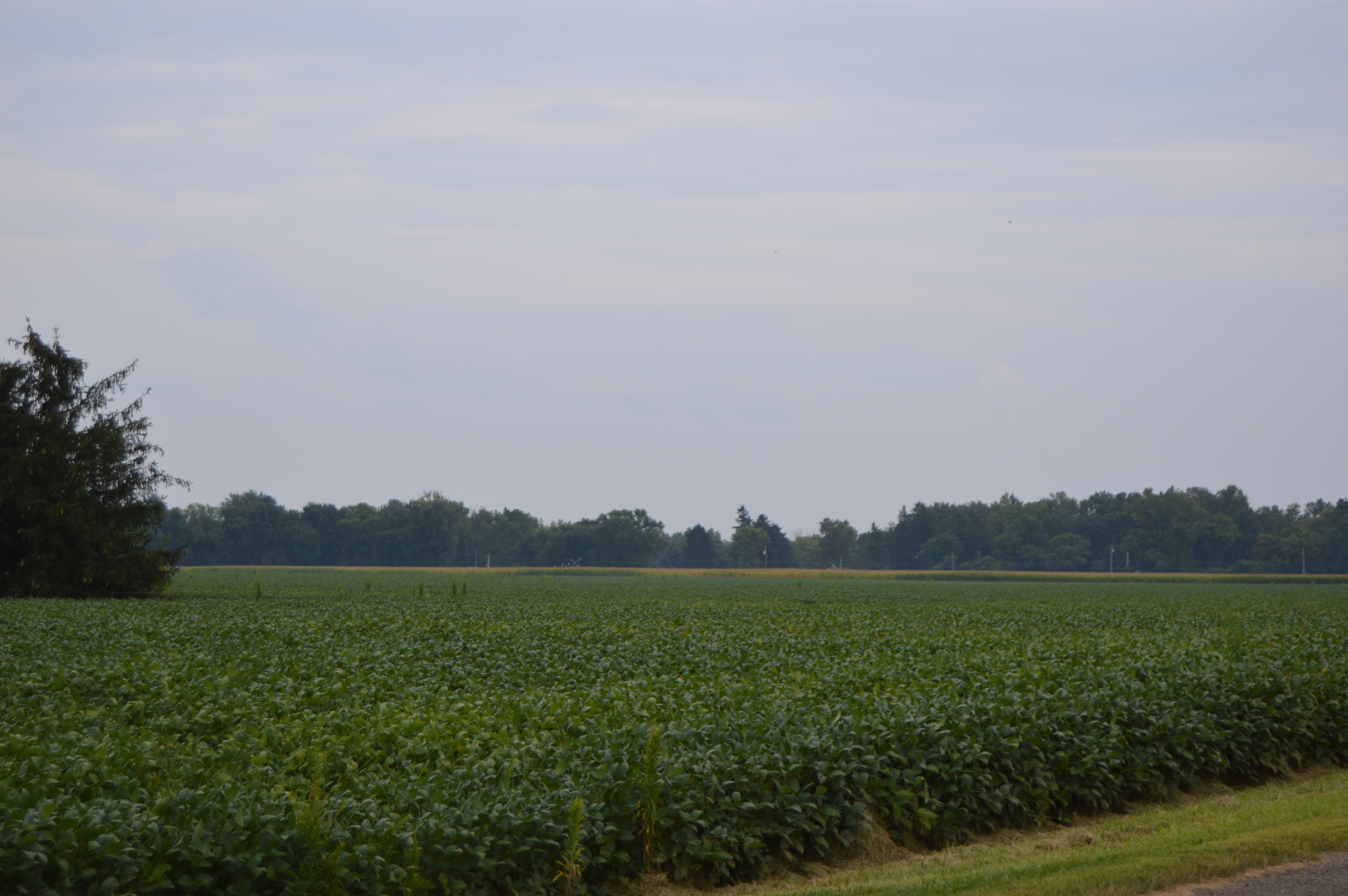
- Fields southwest of Waterville

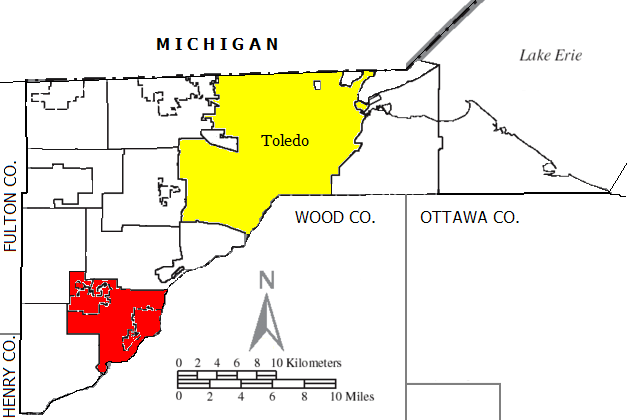
- Waterville Township, Lucas County, Ohio
- Coordinates: 41°30′33″N 83°45′42″W
- Country: United States
- State: Ohio
- County: Lucas

Area
  - Total: 24.1 sq mi (62.3 km^{2})
  - Land: 23.2 sq mi (60.2 km^{2})
  - Water: 0.81 sq mi (2.1 km^{2})
- Elevation: 643 ft (196 m)

Population (2020)
  - Total: 7,036
  - Density: 303/sq mi (117/km^{2})
- Time zone: UTC-5 (Eastern (EST))
  - Summer (DST): UTC-4 (EDT)
- ZIP code: 43566
- Area code: 419
- FIPS code: 39-81872
- GNIS feature ID: 1086539
- Website: www.watervilletownship.com

Waterville Township is one of the eleven townships of Lucas County, Ohio, United States. The 2020 census found 7,036 people in the township.

== Geography ==
Located in the southern part of the county along the Maumee River, it borders the following townships:

- Monclova Township - north
- Perrysburg Township, Wood County - northeast
- Middleton Township, Wood County - east
- Washington Township, Wood County - south
- Providence Township - southwest
- Swanton Township - northwest

Two villages are located in Waterville Township: Waterville in the southeast along the Maumee River, and Whitehouse in the northwest.

== Name and history ==
It is the only Waterville Township statewide.

== Education ==
Students from Waterville Township attend the Anthony Wayne Local School District.

== Government ==
The township is governed by a three-member board of trustees, who are elected in November of odd-numbered years to a four-year term beginning on the following January 1. Two are elected in the year after the presidential election and one is elected in the year before it. There is also an elected township fiscal officer, who serves a four-year term beginning on April 1 of the year after the election, which is held in November of the year before the presidential election. Vacancies in the fiscal officership or on the board of trustees are filled by the remaining trustees.
