= Sauder =

Sauder is a surname. Notable people with the surname include:

- Erie J. Sauder (1904–1997), American inventor and furniture-maker
  - Sauder Woodworking Company
- Lloyd Sauder (born 1950), Canadian politician
- Luke Sauder (born 1970), Canadian alpine skier
- Peter Sauder, Canadian film and TV writer, television producer and animator
- Theo Sauder (born 1996), Canadian rugby player
- William Sauder (1926–2007), Canadian industrialist
  - UBC Sauder School of Business, endowed by William Sauder
