= Swan Creek Township, Fulton County, Ohio =

Township in Ohio, US

- Township
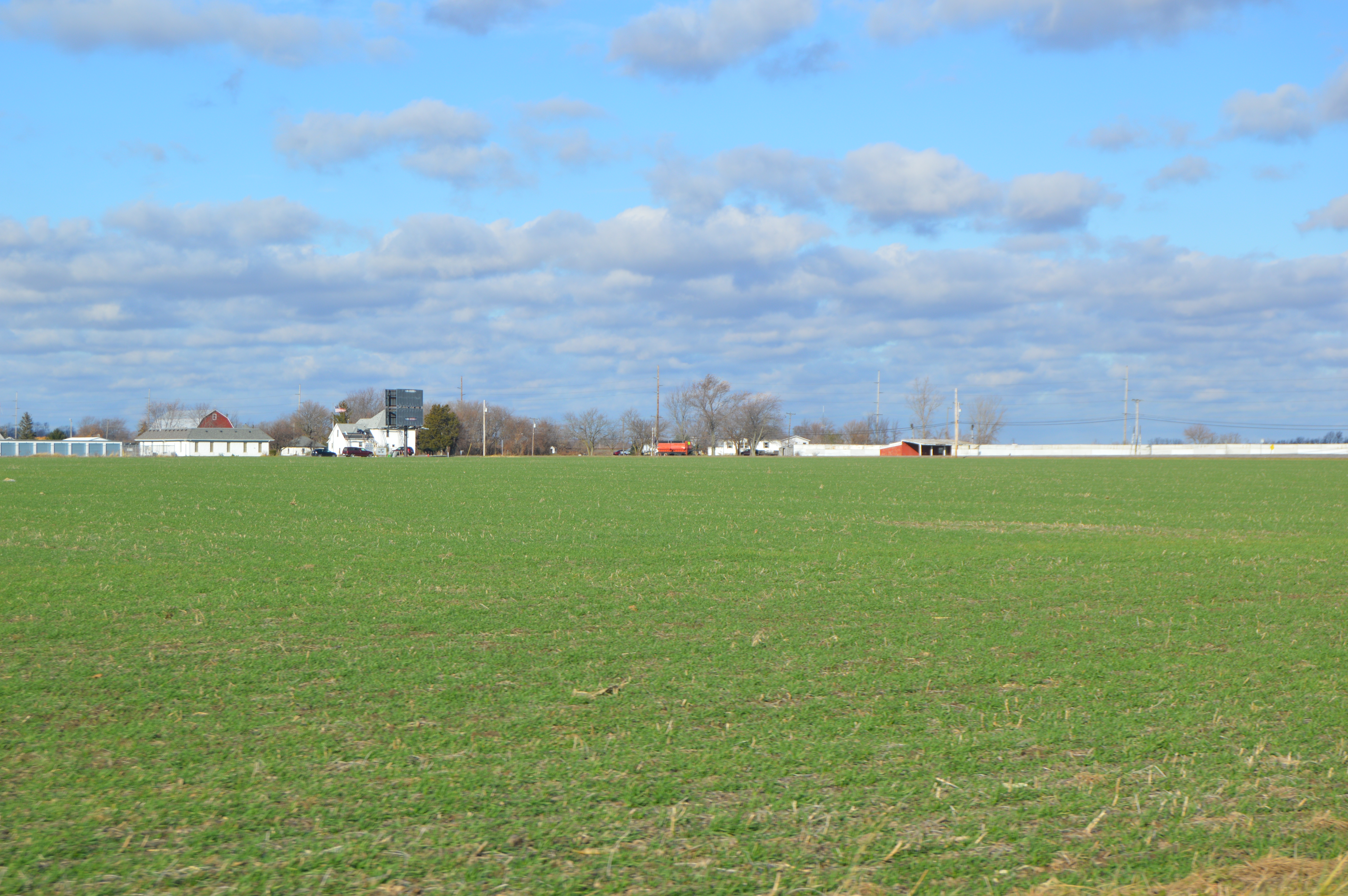
- Farmland southeast of Delta

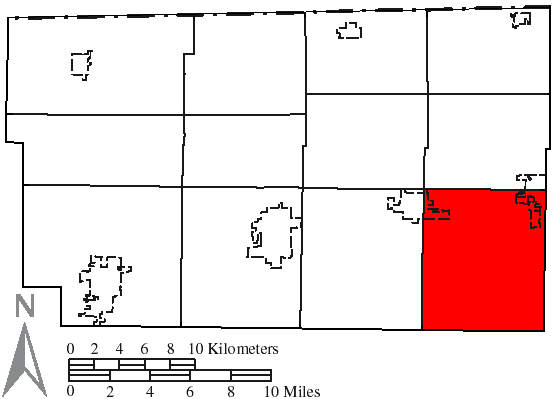
- Location of Swan Creek Township in Fulton County
- Coordinates: 41°33′28″N 83°56′9″W
- Country: United States
- State: Ohio
- County: Fulton

Area
  - Total: 42.2 sq mi (109.4 km^{2})
  - Land: 42.0 sq mi (108.9 km^{2})
  - Water: 0.15 sq mi (0.4 km^{2})
- Elevation: 669 ft (204 m)

Population (2020)
  - Total: 8,555
  - Density: 203.5/sq mi (78.56/km^{2})
- Time zone: UTC-5 (Eastern (EST))
  - Summer (DST): UTC-4 (EDT)
- FIPS code: 39-75861
- GNIS feature ID: 1086130
- Website: swancreektwp.org

Swan Creek Township is one of the twelve townships of Fulton County, Ohio, United States. As of the 2020 census the population was 8,555.

== Geography ==
Located in the southeastern corner of the county, it borders the following townships:

- Fulton Township - north
- Swanton Township, Lucas County - east
- Providence Township, Lucas County - southeast
- Washington Township, Henry County - south
- Liberty Township, Henry County - southwestern corner
- York Township - west
- Pike Township - northwestern corner

Much of the village of Swanton is located in northeastern Swan Creek Township, and part of the village of Delta is located in northwestern Swan Creek Township.

== Name and history ==
It is the only Swan Creek Township statewide.

== Government ==
The township is governed by a three-member board of trustees, who are elected in November of odd-numbered years to a four-year term beginning on the following January 1. Two are elected in the year after the presidential election and one is elected in the year before it. There is also an elected township fiscal officer, who serves a four-year term beginning on April 1 of the year after the election, which is held in November of the year before the presidential election. Vacancies in the fiscal officership or on the board of trustees are filled by the remaining trustees.
