= Four County Career Center =

Coordinates: 41°27′10″N 84°18′11″W

- Established: May 1966
- Superintendent: Jeff Slattery
- Students: 1,000+
- Location: Archbold, Ohio, U.S.
- Website: www.fourcounty.net

Four County Career Center (Formerly Four County JVS) is a public vocational school located in Ridgeville Township, Henry County, Ohio, south of Archbold. The school derives its name from the fact that it primarily serves students from school districts in the four Ohio counties of Defiance, Fulton, Henry, and Williams.

== History ==
Four County began in May 1966 when the career center district was formed. It first opened its doors in September 1969 to 900 juniors and seniors in a building that cost US$5,000,000. Four County was also the first vocational school in Ohio to be built with local funding. With updated modifications, the original five acre building has graduated over 22,000 students since it opened.
