= Archbold Area Local School District =

School district in Ohio, United States

Address
- 600 Lafayette Street Archbold, Ohio, 43502; United States
- Coordinates: 41°31′6″N 84°18′20″W

District information
- Type: Public
- Grades: KG–12
- Schools: 3
- NCES District ID: 3904704

Students and staff
- Students: 1,112 (2025–2026)
- Teachers: 57.96 (on an FTE basis) (2025–2026)
- Staff: 80.48 (on an FTE basis) (2025–2026)
- Student–teacher ratio: 19.19 (2025–2026)

Other information
- Website: sites.google.com/archboldschools.org/archbold

Archbold Local School District is a school district in Northwest Ohio. The school district serves students who live in the villages of Archbold, Elmira, and Ridgeville Corners located in Fulton County. The superintendent is Jason Selgo.

== Schools ==
- Archbold Elementary School (Grades K–4)
- Archbold Middle School (Grades 5–8)
- Archbold High School (Grades 9–12)
