= Goll Homestead =

Historic house in Ohio, United States

- U.S. National Register of Historic Places
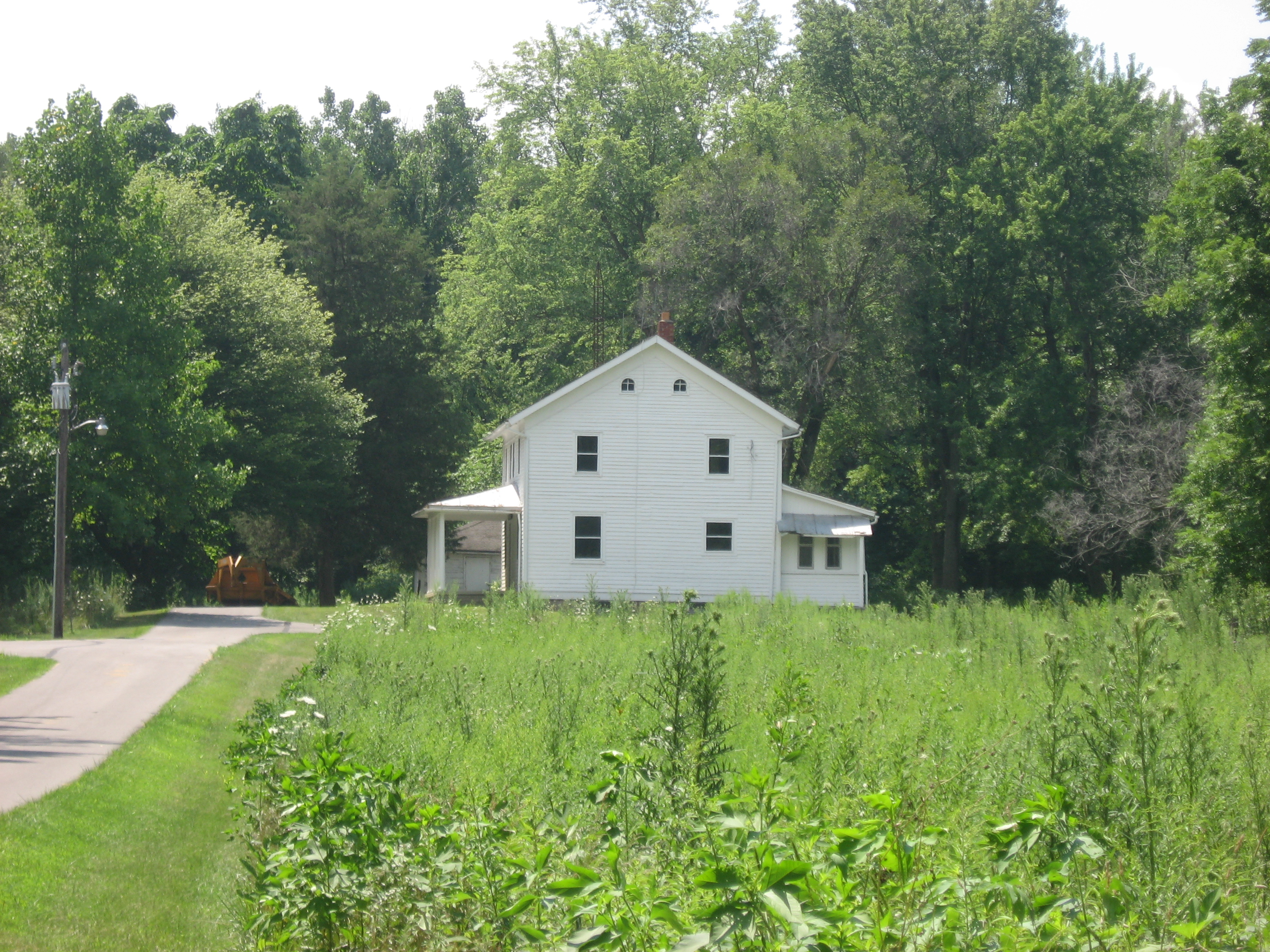
- Side of the farmhouse

- Location within Ohio Location within the United States
- Location: 26093 Township Road F, German Township, Fulton County
- Nearest city: Archbold, Ohio
- Coordinates: 41°33′22″N 84°21′51″W
- Area: 2.3 acres (0.93 ha)
- Built: 1862
- Architectural style: Four over four
- NRHP reference No.: 05001185
- Added to NRHP: October 26, 2005

The Goll Homestead is a historic farm complex in far western Fulton County, Ohio, United States. Located in German Township northwest of Archbold, the farm has been declared a historic site because of its role in the region's settlement.

== House ==
Before white settlement, Fulton County was a very heavily wooded region. Although most early settlers in this Black Swamp county cleared their lands, Peter Goll Sr. and his wife Catherine preserved significant areas of virgin woodlands on their property. After immigrating to the United States from France in 1836, the Golls' first home in western Fulton County was a log cabin, approximately 3 miles (4.8 km) east of the present farmstead. As Peter Goll Jr. grew to adulthood, he married and established a new farmstead; building a new house, he used a distinctively European method of massive timber construction derived from the vernacular architecture of the region's earliest French and German settlers. In 1862, one day before their child was born, Peter Jr. and his wife moved into the new white wooden house. Soon afterward, his parents also moved into the house. In order to accommodate both households, the structure was built divided into two parts, each accessible by a different front door.

== Barn ==
Three years after the house was completed, the Golls erected a barn to shelter their different types of livestock: horses, dairy cows, and possibly pigs. Like the house, the barn employed distinctive construction methods; its structure was based on wooden mortise and tenon construction, with the massive beams being made from oak trees cut on the property. In later years, the barn was modified several times; one of these renovations involved the raising of the entire structure by one story to simplify the keeping of livestock.

== Public ownership ==
The house and related buildings remained in the Goll family for a full century. By the 1960s, ownership had passed to a descendant named Florence Louys, who decided to sell the farmstead and woods to the Ohio Department of Natural Resources (ODNR), which converted it into parkland, the Goll Woods State Nature Preserve. After the state took control of the property, the house and barn were converted for park purposes; the barn was used for storage, and park rangers lived in the house. By the 1990s, ODNR had decided to cease using the house for residential purposes, and the decision was made in the early 2000s to demolish both buildings. Some local residents reacted strongly against this proposal; by working with ODNR and the Ohio General Assembly, they were able to secure grants from the state for the property's restoration, and renovation efforts began in both the barn and the house.

In 2005, the Goll Homestead, comprising four buildings spread out over an area of 2.3 acres (0.93 ha), was listed on the National Register of Historic Places. It qualified for inclusion both because of its place in local history and because of its well-preserved historic architecture: it was a survivor of the county's early period of settlement, and its buildings employed elements of distinctively European architecture, such as construction with large timbers. Since that time, restoration efforts have continued — volunteer members of the nonprofit Friends of Goll Homestead have repaired the buildings and returned them to a condition more closely resembling the days of Peter Goll Jr., while teams from Eastern Michigan University have aided in removing modifications to the house in hopes of converting it into a base from which to conduct experiments in the surrounding woodland.
