= Elmira, Ohio =

Unincorporated community in Ohio, U.S.

Coordinates: 41°34′44″N 84°18′24″W

Elmira is an unincorporated community in Fulton County, Ohio, United States.

== History ==
A post office was established at Elmira in 1839, and about eleven years later was moved to Burlington where the office apparently retained the name Elmira.

Elmira is a trailhead for the Wabash Cannonball Trail, a rail trail conversion of the defunct Wabash Railroad. A 210-foot railroad bridge spans the Tiffin River on the trail just west of the community.
