= Pike-Delta-York Local School District =

School district in Ohio, United States

Address
- 504 Fernwood Street Delta, Ohio, 43515; United States
- Coordinates: 41°34′30″N 84°0′9″W

District information
- Type: Public
- Grades: KG–12
- Schools: 3
- NCES District ID: 3904708

Students and staff
- Students: 1,081 (2024–2025)
- Teachers: 67.38 (on an FTE basis) (2024–2025)
- Staff: 106.80 (on an FTE basis) (2024–2025)
- Student–teacher ratio: 16.04 (2024–2025)

Other information
- Website: www.pdys.org

Pike-Delta-York Local School District is a school district in Northwest Ohio. The school district serves students who live in the village of Delta, as well as the surrounding rural areas located in Fulton County. The superintendent is Dr. Douglas J Ford.

== Schools ==
=== Grades 9-12 ===
- Delta High School

=== Grades 6-8 ===
- Delta Middle School

=== Grades K-5 ===
- Delta Elementary School
