= Goll Woods State Nature Preserve =

State Nature Preserve in Fulton County, Ohio, United States

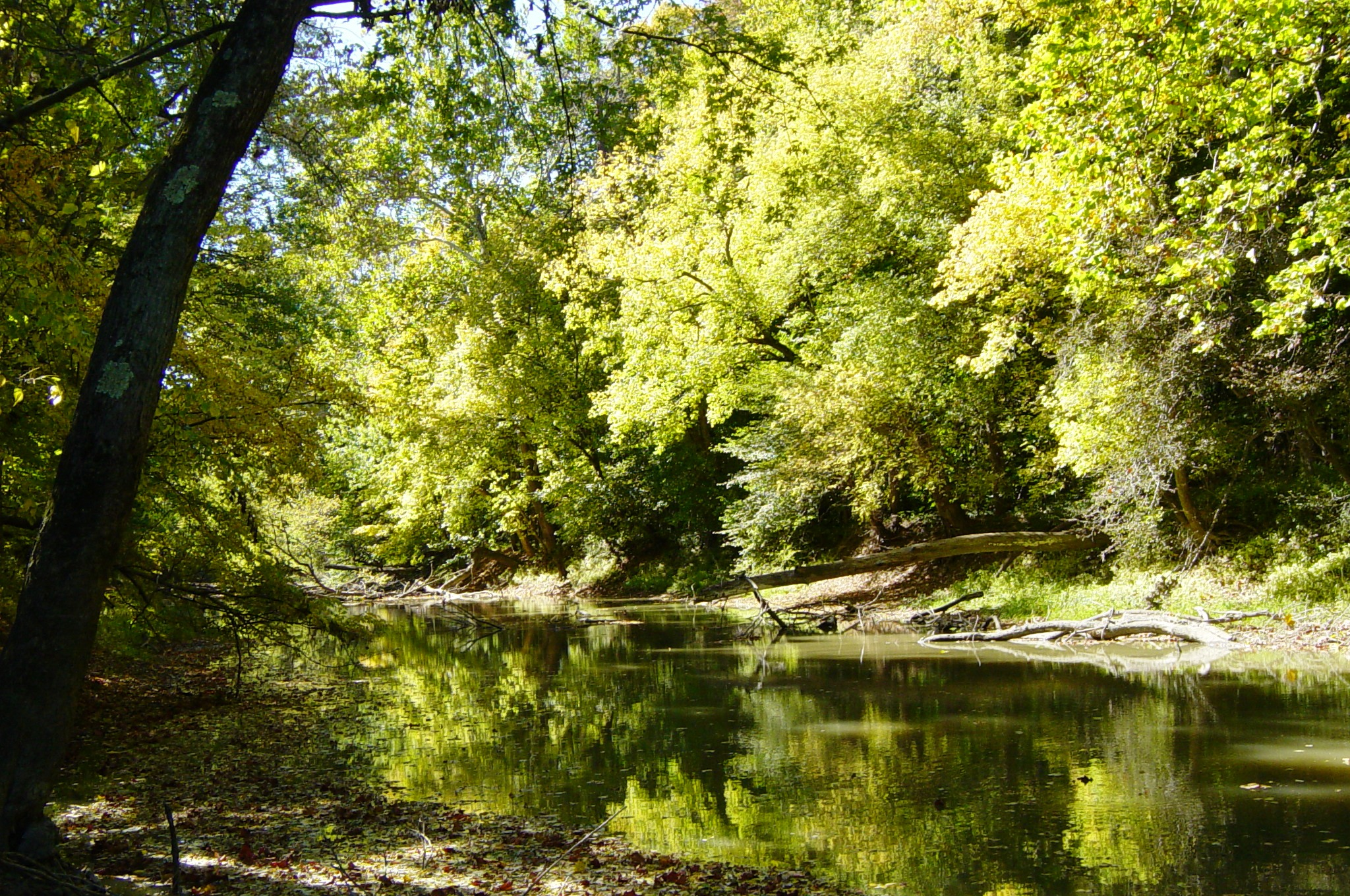
- The Tiffin River at the Goll Woods State Nature Preserve

- Location within Ohio Location within the United States
- Location: Fulton County, Ohio, United States
- Coordinates: 41.5535862°N 84.3615031°W
- Area: 321 acres (130 ha)
- Established: 1969
- Named for: Peter and Catherine Goll
- Governing body: Ohio Department of Natural Resources Division of Parks and Recreation
- Website: Ohio Department of Natural Resources-Goll Woods State Nature Preserve

Goll Woods State Nature Preserve is a 321-acre (130 ha) nature preserve in western Fulton County, Ohio, near Archbold. It has been designated a National Natural Landmark for its oak–hickory forest.

== History ==
It is named after Peter and Catherine Goll, who moved to America from Grand-Charmont, France in 1836. The Goll family descendants loved the big trees and guarded the woods against timber operators for several generations. The State of Ohio established the nature preserve in 1969.

== Features ==
=== Natural ===
The nature preserve features gigantic 200-400 year old-growth trees that often measure 4 feet in diameter, reminiscent of the Great Black Swamp. There is a small area that preserves the rare ecosystem of Oak Openings, which consists very large specimens of white and bur oaks, but without any of the small under story trees. The Indians of the area created an open savanna to facilitate their hunting by keeping the brush and small trees down, by burning in the fall. The first settlers could easily drive their wagons in any direction through the sparsely spaced trees.

==== Trees ====
The preserve is composed of Elm-Ash-Maple swamp forest and mesophytic forest with many oak trees in the lower elevations. Because of drainage efforts for agriculture, the woods is transitioning slowly to Beech-Maple forest. In 2006, one of the largest burr oak trees, over 450 years old, died of old age. It had a DBH (diameter at breast height) of 56 inches and stood 112 feet tall.

==== Wildflowers ====
Early in the year, over 40 species of ephemeral spring wildflowers including large flowered trillium, Ohio's state wildflower, bloodroot, columbine, marsh marigold, spotted coral-root and three-birds-orchid are in bloom.

=== Historical ===
Besides being a nature preserve, Goll Woods also holds historical significance.

==== Goll Homestead ====
On the nature preserve is a historic farm complex known as Goll Homestead, initially designated for destruction, but now listed on the National Register of Historic Places, with its distinctive European design, constructed of large timbers.

==== Goll Cemetery ====
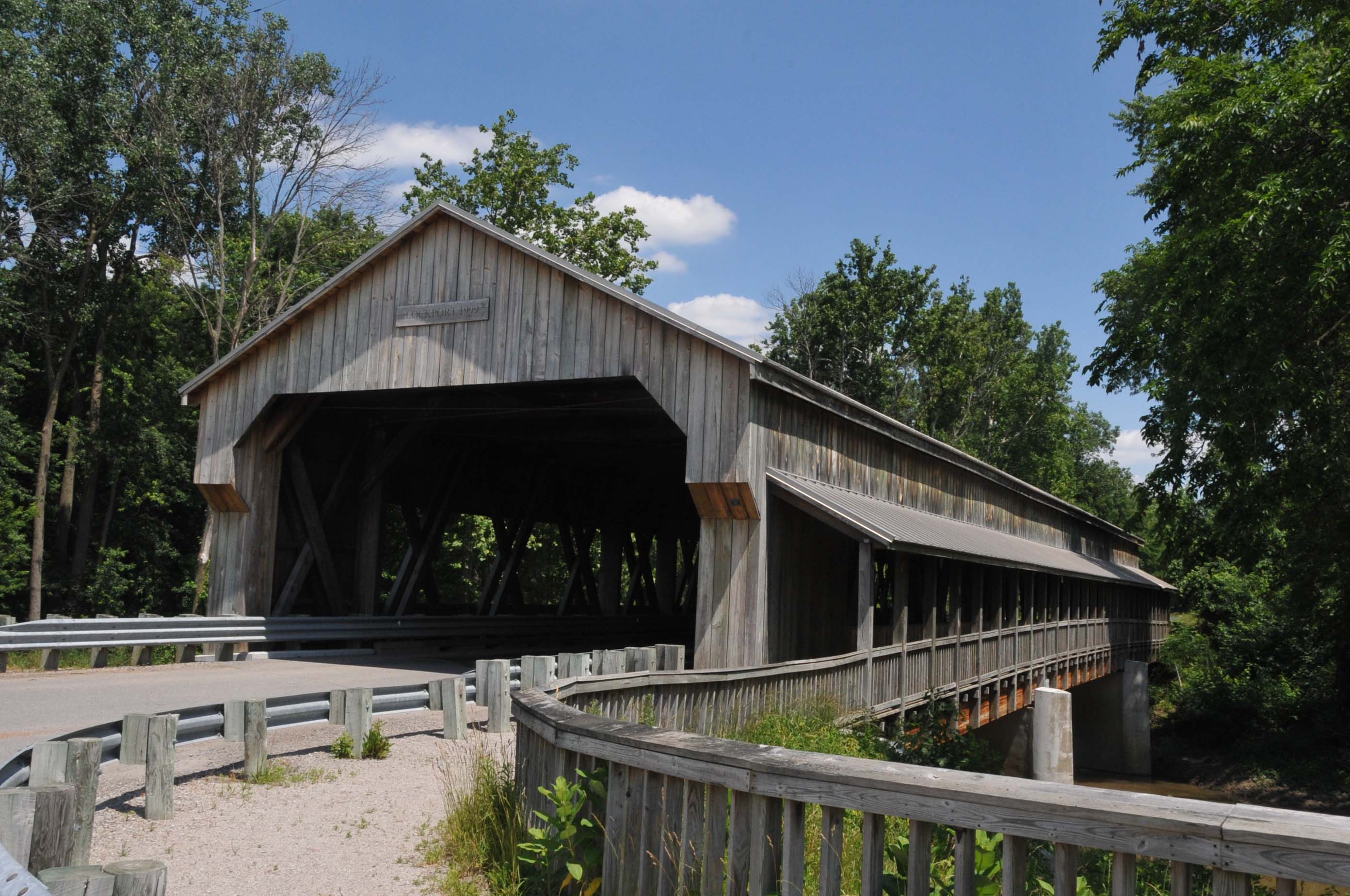
The Lockport Covered Bridge near Goll Woods State Nature Preserve

Goll cemetery also lies on the preserve grounds. The 3/4 acre burial ground was set aside early by Peter and Catherine Goll, where they laid to rest a young child. Many from the Goll family are now buried there, as well as those from Louys, Valiton, Beucler, Seigneur, Cramer, and Klopfenstein families.

==== Lockport Covered Bridge ====
Nearby, just 1.3 miles southwest of the nature preserve, on County Road I-25, is the Lockport Covered Bridge in Lock Port, Ohio, spanning the Tiffin River that runs near the nature preserve. It is feature on the Northwest Ohio River Trail and was a winner in the 2002 National Timber Bridge Awards competition, and is often associated by travelers with the nature preserve.
