= York Township, Fulton County, Ohio =

Township in Ohio, US

- Township
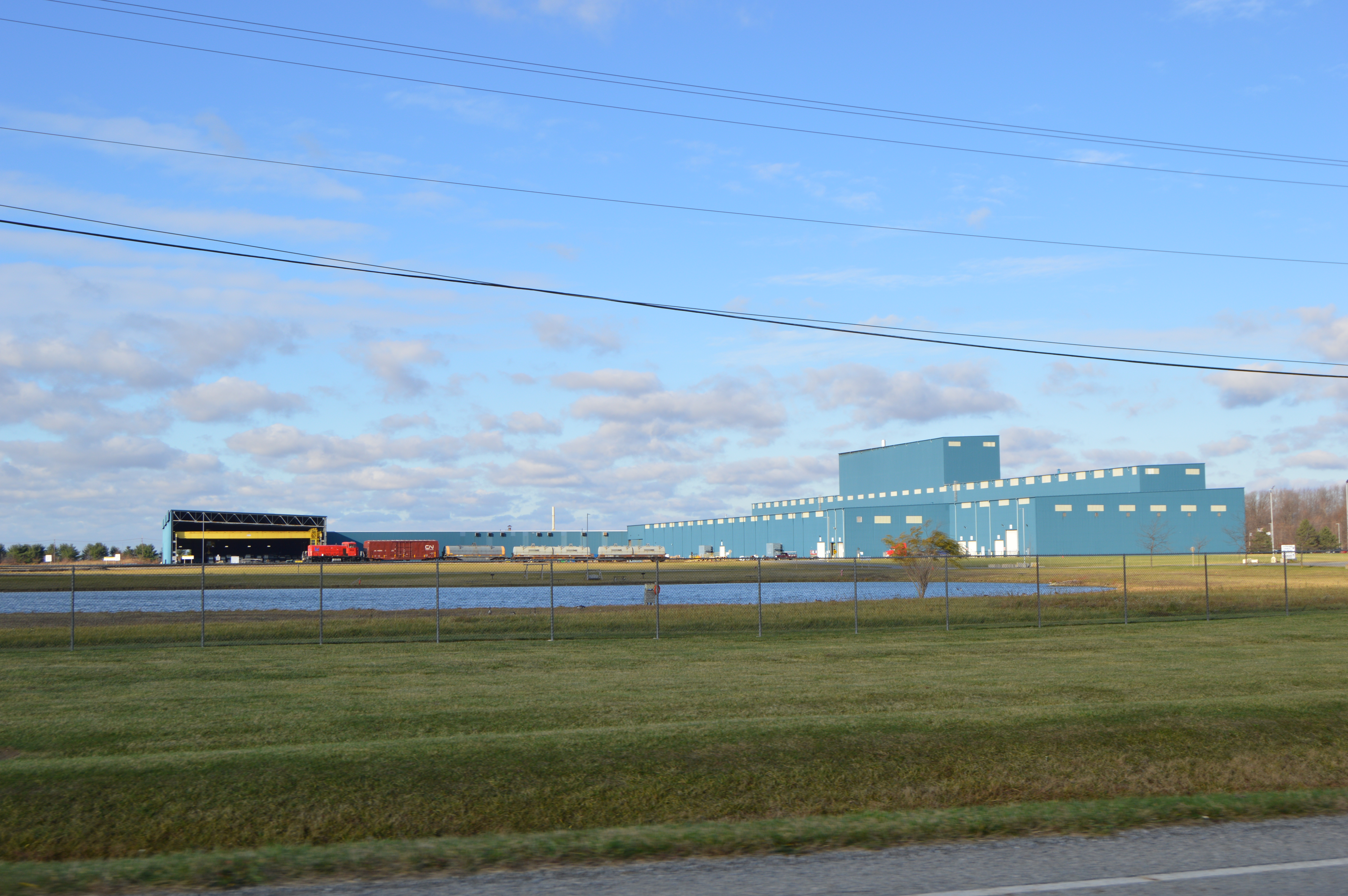
- Worthington Industries factory west of Delta

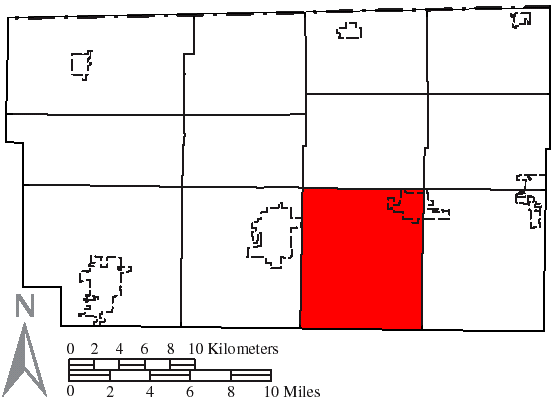
- Location of York Township in Fulton County
- Coordinates: 41°33′26″N 84°2′6″W
- Country: United States
- State: Ohio
- County: Fulton

Area
  - Total: 42.17 sq mi (109.23 km^{2})
  - Land: 42.11 sq mi (109.07 km^{2})
  - Water: 0.062 sq mi (0.16 km^{2})
- Elevation: 719 ft (219 m)

Population (2020)
  - Total: 4,257
  - Density: 101.1/sq mi (39.03/km^{2})
- Time zone: UTC-5 (Eastern (EST))
  - Summer (DST): UTC-4 (EDT)
- FIPS code: 39-87024
- GNIS feature ID: 1086131
- Website: https://www.yorktownship-fultoncounty.com/

York Township is one of the twelve townships of Fulton County, Ohio, United States. As of the 2020 census the population was 4,257.

== Geography ==
Located in the southern part of the county, it borders the following townships:

- Pike Township - north
- Fulton Township - northeast corner
- Swan Creek Township - east
- Washington Township, Henry County - southeast corner
- Liberty Township, Henry County - south
- Freedom Township, Henry County - southwest corner
- Clinton Township - west
- Dover Township - northwest corner

Much of the village of Delta is located in northeastern York Township.

== Name and history ==
One of ten York Townships statewide, York Township was organized in 1836.

== Government ==
The township is governed by a three-member board of trustees, who are elected in November of odd-numbered years to a four-year term beginning on the following January 1. Two are elected in the year after the presidential election and one is elected in the year before it. There is also an elected township fiscal officer, who serves a four-year term beginning on April 1 of the year after the election, which is held in November of the year before the presidential election. Vacancies in the fiscal officership or on the board of trustees are filled by the remaining trustees.
