= Goll (surname) =

Goll is a surname. Notable people with the surname include:

- Claire Goll (1890–1977), writer and journalist, wife of Yvan
- Heinz Goll (1934–1999), Austrian-born sculptor and painter
- Jacob Goll (born 1992), German ice hockey goaltender
- James Goll (1927–1992), American politician from Nebraska
- Yvan Goll (1891–1950), French-German expressionist and surrealist poet
- Goll Woods State Nature Preserve, named after Peter and Catherine Goll, 1836 emigrants from Grand Charmont, France
