= Erie J. Sauder =

American inventor (1904–1997)

- Born: August 6, 1904; Archbold, Ohio
- Died: June 29, 1997 (aged 92); Archbold, Ohio
- Education: eighth grade
- Occupations: Inventor, cabinetmaker, furniture manufacturer
- Spouses: Leona Short (m. 1927) Orlyss Short (m. 1976)
- Children: Three
- Parent(s): Daniel and Anne (Schrock) Sauder

Erie J. Sauder (August 6, 1904 – June 29, 1997) was an American inventor and furniture-maker. He invented a knock-down table in 1951 and founded a company that produced ready-to-assemble furniture—one of the largest in the United States at the time of his death.

== Early life ==
Sauder was born in Archbold, Ohio, to Daniel and Anne (Schrock) Sauder. In 1927, he married Leona Short. He had only an eighth grade education and was a Mennonite cabinet maker. Sauder worked at the Archbold Ladder Company in his home town before he started his own business in 1934.

== Manufacturing companies ==
The Sauder Woodworking Company initially manufactured church pews, tables and other items. In 1954, he formed the Sauder Manufacturing Company and later diversification included the Archbold Container company. The Sauder Woodworking Company manufactured ready-to-assemble furniture, while Sauder Manufacturing handled church furniture, and the Archbold Container company dealt in materials for packaging. With over 3,200 employees, at the time of his death, the Sauder companies constituted one of the largest companies producing ready-to-assemble furniture in the United States.

In 1975 Sauder retired, but the businesses continued to be run by family.

== Sauder Village ==
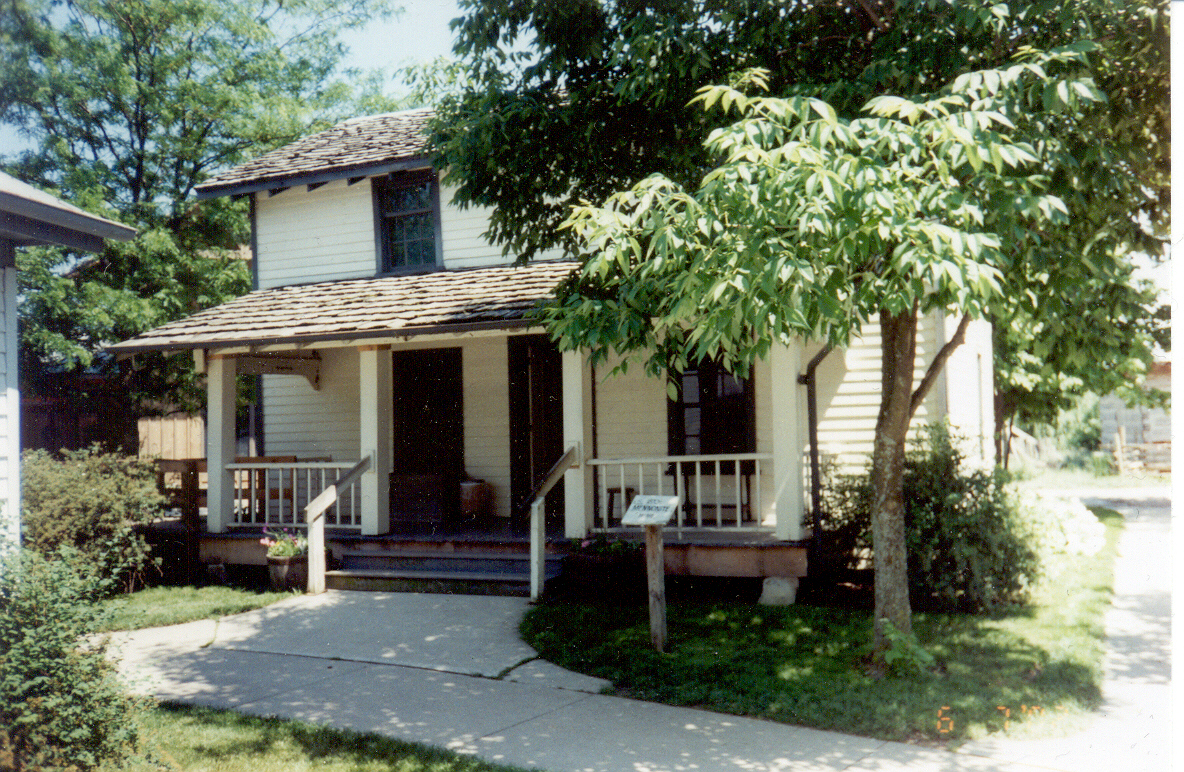
Sauder Village

After retiring, Sauder started Sauder Village which depicts life in nineteenth-century Ohio.
