= Pettisville Local School District =

School district in Ohio

Address
- 232 Summit Street Pettisville, Ohio, 43553; United States
- Coordinates: 41°31′50″N 84°13′47″W

District information
- Type: Public school district
- Grades: KG–12
- Superintendent: Stephen Switzer
- Schools: 2
- NCES District ID: 3904707

Students and staff
- Enrollment: 517 (2016-2017)
- Teachers: 34.94 (on an FTE basis)
- Student–teacher ratio: 14.80
- District mascot: Blackbirds
- Colors: Black and Yellow

Other information
- Website: www.pettisvilleschools.org

Pettisville Local School District is a public school district in Pettisville, Ohio, United States.

== Schools ==
- Pettisville High School
- Pettisville Elementary
