= Washington Township, Henry County, Ohio =

Township in Ohio, US

- Township
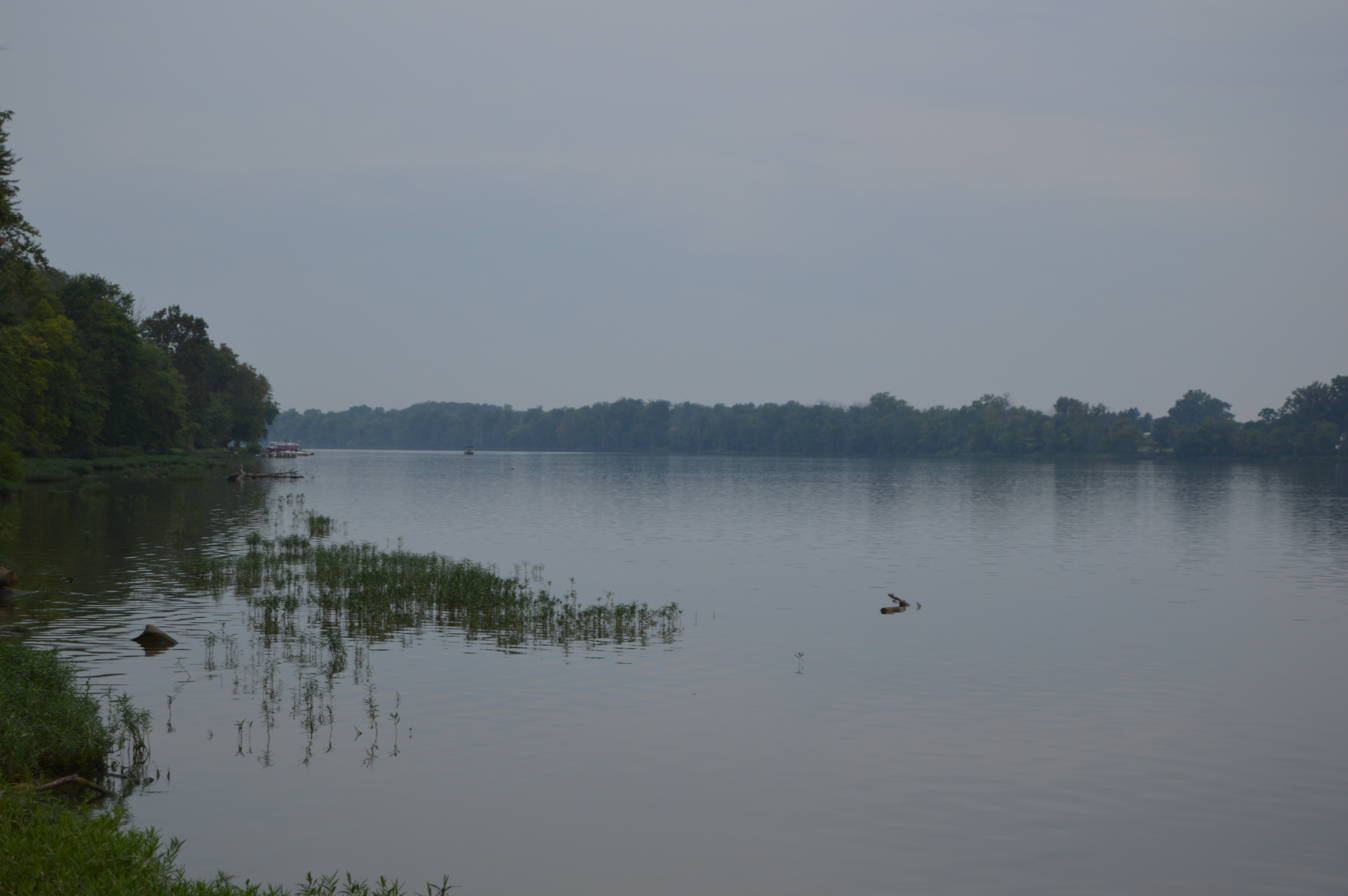
- Maumee River shoreline, seen from Damascus Township

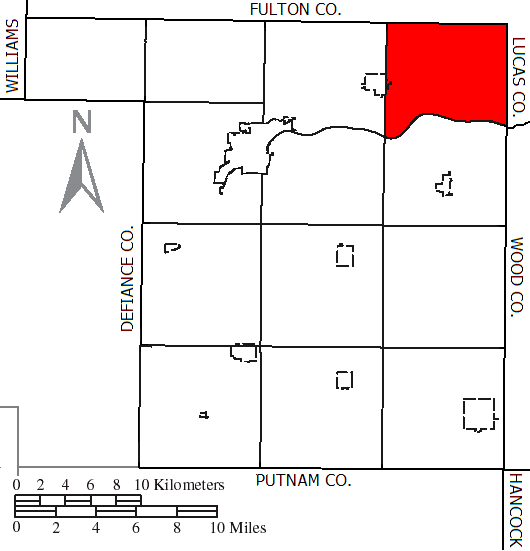
- Location of Washington Township in Henry County
- Coordinates: 41°27′3″N 83°56′54″W
- Country: United States
- State: Ohio
- County: Henry

Area
  - Total: 29.6 sq mi (76.6 km^{2})
  - Land: 28.8 sq mi (74.7 km^{2})
  - Water: 0.73 sq mi (1.9 km^{2})
- Elevation: 669 ft (204 m)

Population (2020)
  - Total: 1,991
  - Density: 69.0/sq mi (26.7/km^{2})
- Time zone: UTC-5 (Eastern (EST))
  - Summer (DST): UTC-4 (EDT)
- FIPS code: 39-81326
- GNIS feature ID: 1086298
- Website: https://washtwphenry.com/

Washington Township is one of the thirteen townships of Henry County, Ohio, United States. As of the 2020 census the population was 1,991.

== Geography ==
Located in the northeastern corner of the county, it borders the following townships:

- Swan Creek Township, Fulton County - north
- Providence Township, Lucas County - east
- Grand Rapids Township, Wood County - southeast corner
- Damascus Township - south
- Harrison Township - southwest corner
- Liberty Township - west
- York Township, Fulton County - northwest corner

A small portion of the village of Liberty Center is located in western Washington Township, and the unincorporated community of Colton lies in the township's northwest.

== Name and history ==
It is one of forty-three Washington Townships statewide.

== Government ==
The township is governed by a three-member board of trustees, who are elected in November of odd-numbered years to a four-year term beginning on the following January 1. Two are elected in the year after the presidential election and one is elected in the year before it. There is also an elected township fiscal officer, who serves a four-year term beginning on April 1 of the year after the election, which is held in November of the year before the presidential election. Vacancies in the fiscal officership or on the board of trustees are filled by the remaining trustees.
