= Colton, Ohio =

Unincorporated community in Ohio, U.S.

Coordinates: 41°27′53″N 83°57′09″W

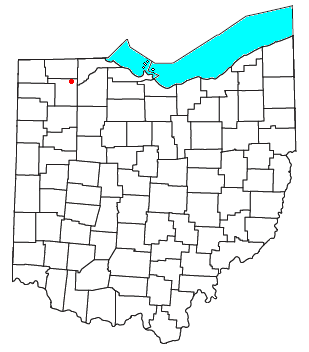
Location of Colton, Ohio

Colton is an unincorporated community in northwestern Washington Township, Henry County, Ohio, United States. It has a post office with the ZIP code 43510. It is located along County Road 4A, approximately four miles north of U.S. Route 24.

== History ==
Colton was platted in 1855. A post office was established at Colton in 1856, and remained in operation until 1984.
