= Burlington, Fulton County, Ohio =

Unincorporated community in Ohio, U.S.

Coordinates: 41°34′18″N 84°18′22″W

Burlington is an unincorporated community in Fulton County, in the U.S. state of Ohio.

== History ==
Burlington was laid out in 1839. A post office was moved from nearby Elmira to Burlington about 1850 but the name of the post office was not changed. The "Elmira" post office closed in 1957.
