= Providence Township, Lucas County, Ohio =

Township in Ohio, US

- Township
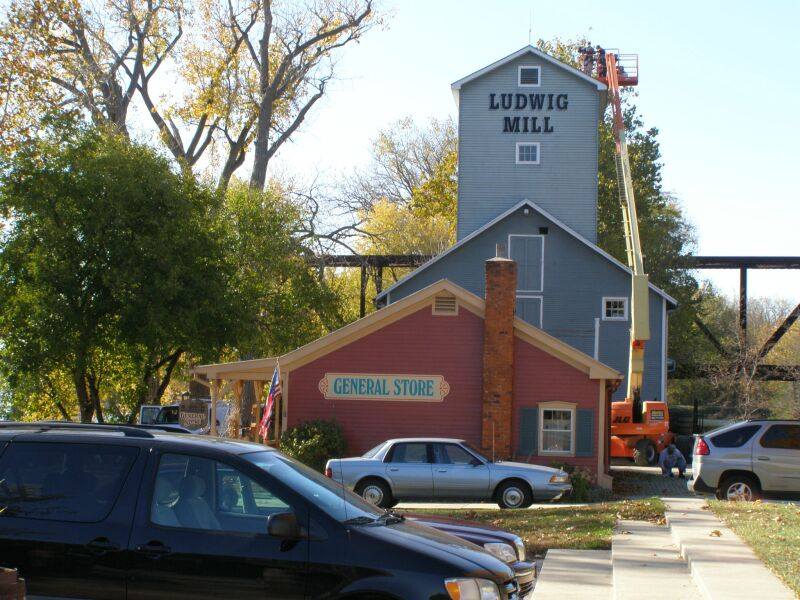
- Isaac R. Ludwig Historical Mill in Providence MetroPark

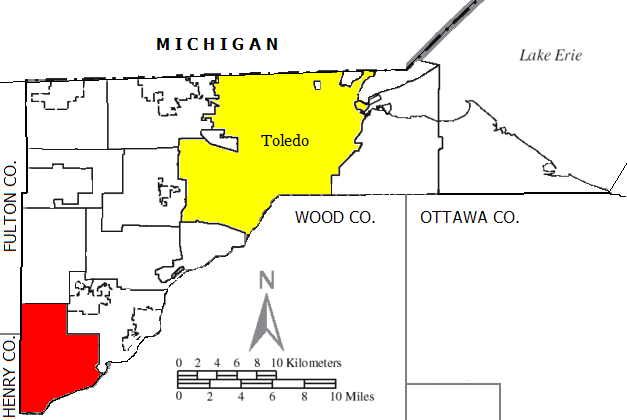
- Location of Providence Township in Lucas County, Ohio
- Coordinates: 41°27′51″N 83°50′39″W
- Country: United States
- State: Ohio
- County: Lucas

Area
  - Total: 26.6 sq mi (68.8 km^{2})
  - Land: 26.1 sq mi (67.6 km^{2})
  - Water: 0.50 sq mi (1.3 km^{2})
- Elevation: 659 ft (201 m)

Population (2020)
  - Total: 3,378
  - Density: 129/sq mi (50.0/km^{2})
- Time zone: UTC-5 (Eastern (EST))
  - Summer (DST): UTC-4 (EDT)
- FIPS code: 39-64836
- GNIS feature ID: 1086531
- Website: www.providencetwp.org

Providence Township is one of the eleven townships of Lucas County, Ohio, United States. The 2020 census found 3,378 people in the township.

== Geography ==
Located in the far southern part of the county along the Maumee River, it borders the following townships:

- Swanton Township - north
- Waterville Township - northeast
- Washington Township, Wood County - southeast
- Grand Rapids Township, Wood County - south
- Damascus Township, Henry County - southwest corner
- Washington Township, Henry County - west
- Swan Creek Township, Fulton County - northwest

No municipalities are located in Providence Township, although the unincorporated communities of Neapolis and Providence lie in the township's northwest and south respectively.

== Name and history ==
Providence Township was organized in 1836. It is the only Providence Township statewide.

== Government ==
The township is governed by a three-member board of trustees, who are elected in November of odd-numbered years to a four-year term beginning on the following January 1. Two are elected in the year after the presidential election and one is elected in the year before it. There is also an elected township fiscal officer, who serves a four-year term beginning on April 1 of the year after the election, which is held in November of the year before the presidential election. Vacancies in the fiscal officership or on the board of trustees are filled by the remaining trustees.
