= Neapolis, Ohio =

- Census-designated place (CDP) & Unincorporated community
- Location in Lucas County and the state of Ohio.
- Coordinates: 41°29′26″N 83°52′36″W
- Country: United States
- State: Ohio
- County: Lucas
- Township: Providence

Area
  - Total: 0.71 sq mi (1.84 km^{2})
  - Land: 0.71 sq mi (1.84 km^{2})
  - Water: 0 sq mi (0.00 km^{2})
- Elevation: 673 ft (205 m)

Population (2020)
  - Total: 497
  - Density: 700.3/sq mi (270.39/km^{2})
- Time zone: UTC-5 (Eastern (EST))
  - Summer (DST): UTC-4 (EDT)
- ZIP codes: 43547
- FIPS code: 39-53718
- GNIS feature ID: 2628936

Neapolis is a census-designated place (CDP) in northwestern Providence Township, Lucas County, Ohio, United States. As of the 2020 census it had a population of 497. It has a post office, with the ZIP code of 43547.

== History ==
Neapolis was laid out in 1872. The community was named after Neapolis, in Ancient Greece. A post office called Neapolis has been in operation since 1873.

== Demographics ==
Historical population
Census	Pop.	Note	%±
2020	497		—
U.S. Decennial Census
