= Whitehouse, Ohio =

- Village
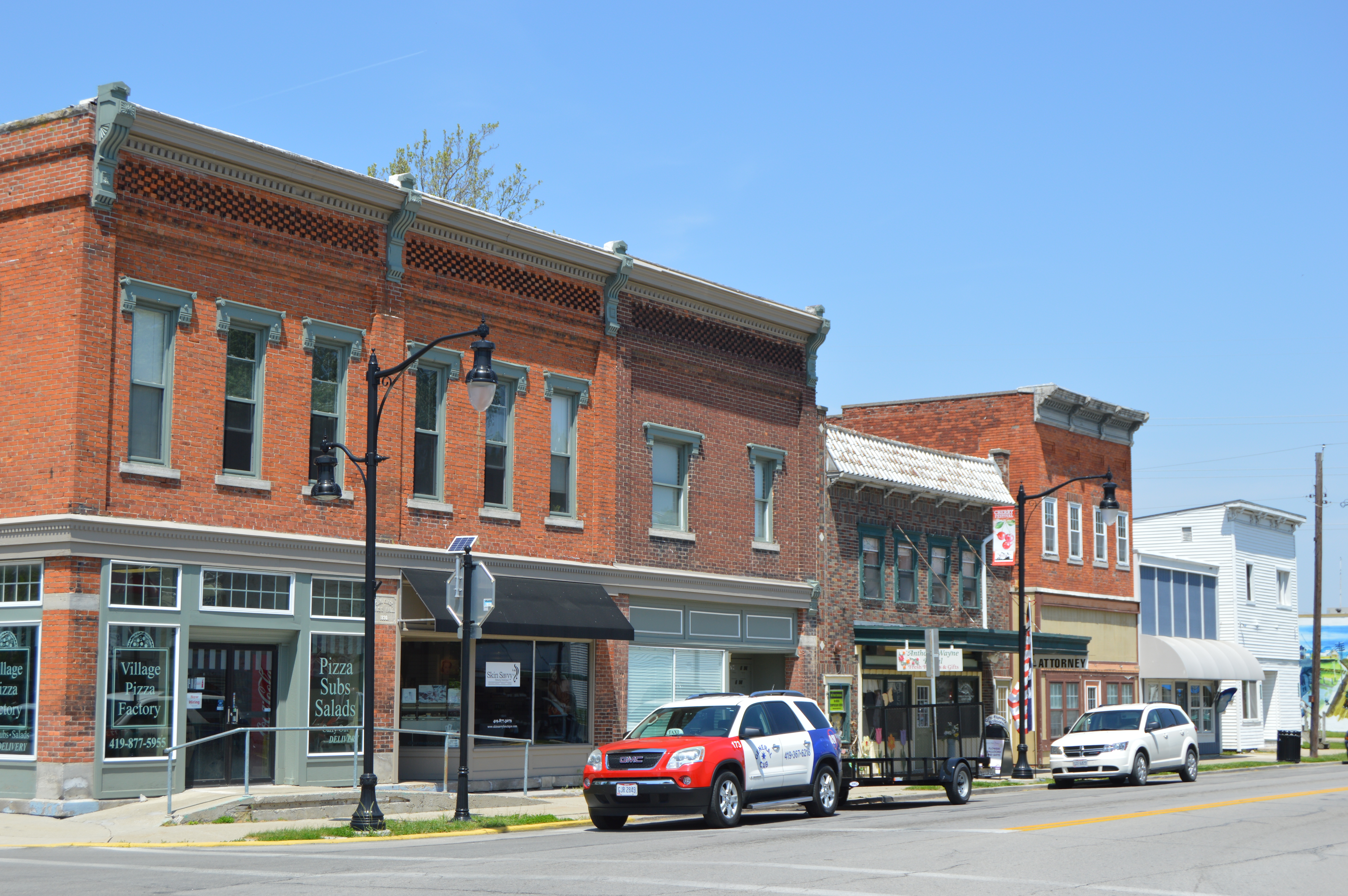
- Providence Street downtown

- Location in Lucas County and the state of Ohio.
- Coordinates: 41°31′18″N 83°47′45″W
- Country: United States
- State: Ohio
- County: Lucas
- Township: Waterville

Government
  - Mayor: Richard Bingham

Area
  - Total: 4.31 sq mi (11.17 km^{2})
  - Land: 4.31 sq mi (11.17 km^{2})
  - Water: 0 sq mi (0.00 km^{2})
- Elevation: 650 ft (200 m)

Population (2020)
  - Total: 4,990
  - Density: 1,157.3/sq mi (446.83/km^{2})
- Time zone: UTC-5 (Eastern (EST))
  - Summer (DST): UTC-4 (EDT)
- ZIP code: 43571
- Area code: 419
- FIPS code: 39-84770
- GNIS feature ID: 2400165
- Website: https://whitehouseoh.gov/

Whitehouse is a village within the Toledo Metropolitan Area in Lucas County, Ohio, United States. The population was 4,990 at the 2020 census.

== History ==
The area now known as the Village of Whitehouse was originally occupied by various Native American tribes, such as the Miami, Ottawa, Shawnee, Wyandot, and Delaware. Settlers of European descent began travelling through the Northwestern Territory after "Mad" Anthony Wayne's victory at the Battle of Fallen Timbers in 1794. Many settlers were of German or Dutch descent in search of farmland. Canal access also attracted many settlers to this particular area. A post office was established as Whitehouse in 1856. Whitehouse was platted in 1864. The village was named for Edward Whitehouse, a railroad official and treasurer of the Wabash Railroad. Whitehouse is also known for being the childhood town of Youtuber Scott The Woz where he produced some of his early videos and often references and refers to

== Geography ==
According to the United States Census Bureau, the village has a total area of 4.29 square miles (11.11 km^{2}), all land.

== Demographics ==
Historical population
| Census | Pop. | Note | %± |
|---|---|---|---|
| 1880 | 554 | | — |
| 1890 | 507 | | −8.5% |
| 1900 | 621 | | 22.5% |
| 1910 | 506 | | −18.5% |
| 1920 | 513 | | 1.4% |
| 1930 | 618 | | 20.5% |
| 1940 | 718 | | 16.2% |
| 1950 | 849 | | 18.2% |
| 1960 | 1,135 | | 33.7% |
| 1970 | 1,542 | | 35.9% |
| 1980 | 2,137 | | 38.6% |
| 1990 | 2,528 | | 18.3% |
| 2000 | 2,733 | | 8.1% |
| 2010 | 4,149 | | 51.8% |
| 2020 | 4,990 | | 20.3% |
U.S. Decennial Census

=== 2020 census ===
As of the 2020 census, Whitehouse had a population of 4,990. The median age was 40.1 years. 25.2% of residents were under the age of 18 and 17.7% of residents were 65 years of age or older. For every 100 females there were 95.4 males, and for every 100 females age 18 and over there were 92.4 males age 18 and over.

91.5% of residents lived in urban areas, while 8.5% lived in rural areas.

There were 1,907 households in Whitehouse, of which 36.1% had children under the age of 18 living in them. Of all households, 60.8% were married-couple households, 12.4% were households with a male householder and no spouse or partner present, and 21.1% were households with a female householder and no spouse or partner present. About 23.1% of all households were made up of individuals and 10.3% had someone living alone who was 65 years of age or older.

There were 1,974 housing units, of which 3.4% were vacant. The homeowner vacancy rate was 1.1% and the rental vacancy rate was 3.3%.

Racial composition as of the 2020 census
| Race | Number | Percent |
|---|---|---|
| White | 4,588 | 91.9% |
| Black or African American | 50 | 1.0% |
| American Indian and Alaska Native | 7 | 0.1% |
| Asian | 22 | 0.4% |
| Native Hawaiian and Other Pacific Islander | 0 | 0.0% |
| Some other race | 42 | 0.8% |
| Two or more races | 281 | 5.6% |
| Hispanic or Latino (of any race) | 164 | 3.3% |

=== 2010 census ===
At the 2010 census, there were 4,149 people, 1,524 households, and 1,145 families living in the village. The population density was 967.1 inhabitants per square mile (373.4/km^{2}). There were 1,591 housing units at an average density of 370.9 per square mile (143.2/km^{2}). The racial makeup of the village was 96.4% White, 0.9% African American, 0.2% Native American, 0.6% Asian, 0.6% from other races, and 1.2% from two or more races. Hispanic or Latino of any race were 2.3% of the population.

Of the 1,524 households 38.6% had children under the age of 18 living with them, 61.2% were married couples living together, 9.7% had a female householder with no husband present, 4.3% had a male householder with no wife present, and 24.9% were non-families. 21.4% of households were one person and 9.3% were one person aged 65 or older. The average household size was 2.67 and the average family size was 3.11.

The median age in the village was 39 years. 27.9% of residents were under the age of 18; 6.1% were between the ages of 18 and 24; 24.6% were from 25 to 44; 29.6% were from 45 to 64; and 12% were 65 or older. The gender makeup of the village was 48.6% male and 51.4% female.

=== 2000 census ===
As of the census of 2000, there were 2,733 people, 1,036 households, and 762 families living in the village. The population density was 791.2 inhabitants per square mile (305.5/km^{2}). There were 1,063 housing units at an average density of 307.7 per square mile (118.8/km^{2}). The racial makeup of the village was 98.46% White, 0.11% African American, 0.11% Native American, 0.26% Asian, 0.04% Pacific Islander, 0.62% from other races, and 0.40% from two or more races. Hispanic or Latino of any race were 1.21% of the population.

Of the 1,036 households 35.8% had children under the age of 18 living with them, 61.8% were married couples living together, 9.2% had a female householder with no husband present, and 26.4% were non-families. 23.4% of households were one person and 9.4% were one person aged 65 or older. The average household size was 2.59 and the average family size was 3.07.

The age distribution was 26.5% under the age of 18, 7.1% from 18 to 24, 26.7% from 25 to 44, 27.4% from 45 to 64, and 12.3% 65 or older. The median age was 40 years. For every 100 females there were 94.7 males. For every 100 females age 18 and over, there were 91.8 males.

The median household income was $52,037 and the median family income was $66,050. Males had a median income of $43,438 versus $30,882 for females. The per capita income for the village was $22,964. About 2.1% of families and 2.6% of the population were below the poverty line, including 1.9% of those under age 18 and 8.2% of those age 65 or over.
