= Delta, Ohio =

- Village
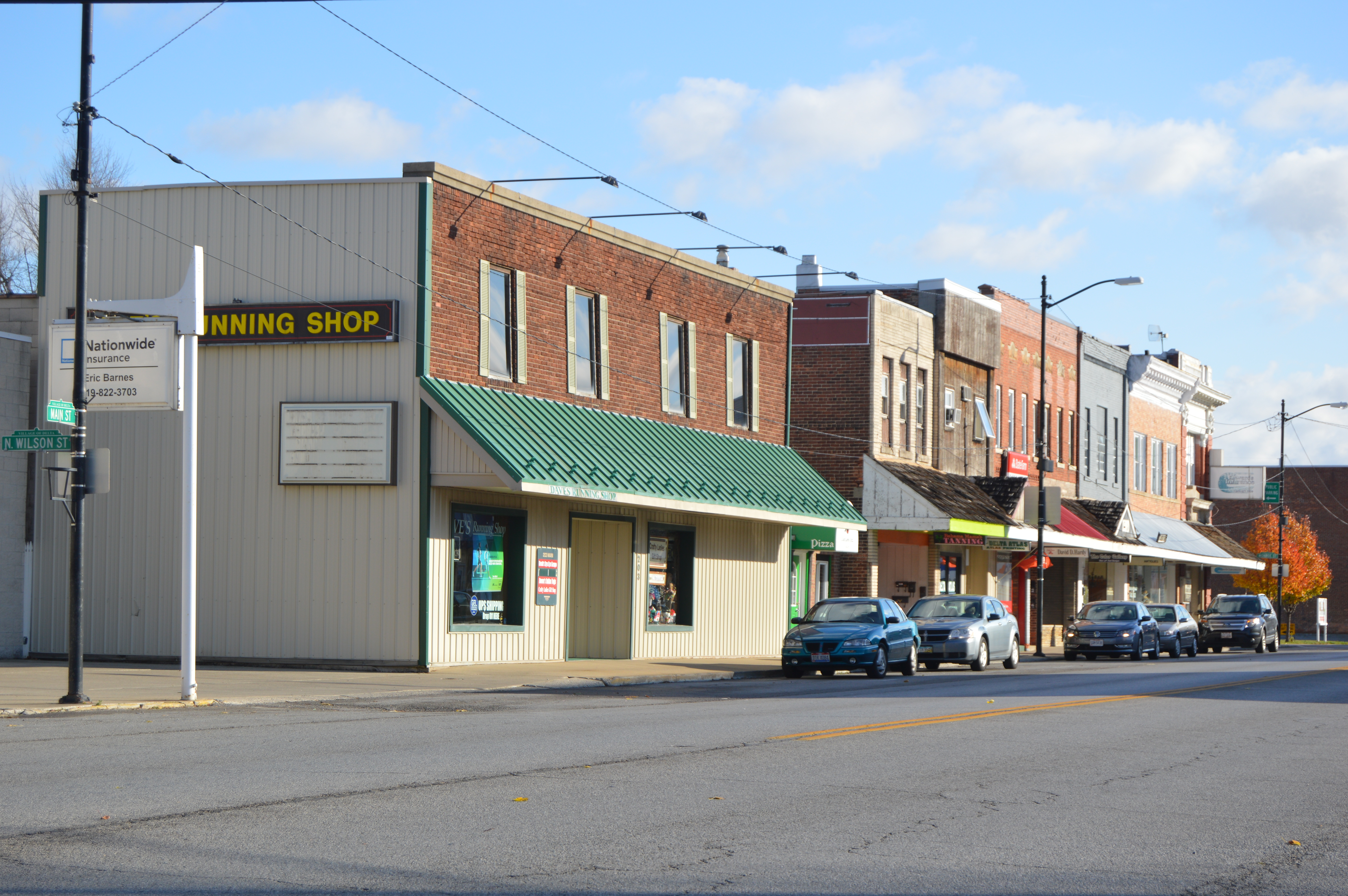
- Main Street

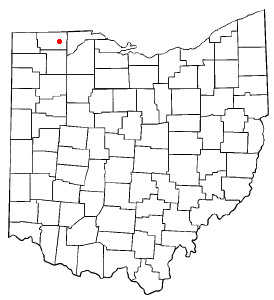
- Location of Delta, Ohio

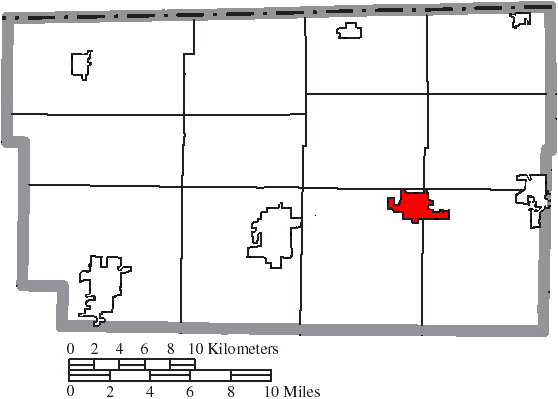
- Location of Delta in Fulton County
- Coordinates: 41°34′30″N 84°00′09″W
- Country: United States
- State: Ohio
- County: Fulton
- Established: August 3, 1863

Government
  - Type: Charter Municipality

Area
  - Total: 3.15 sq mi (8.17 km^{2})
  - Land: 3.15 sq mi (8.17 km^{2})
  - Water: 0 sq mi (0.00 km^{2})
- Elevation: 725 ft (221 m)

Population (2020)
  - Total: 3,316
  - Estimate (2023): 3,301
  - Density: 1,051.2/sq mi (405.86/km^{2})
- Time zone: UTC-5 (Eastern (EST))
  - Summer (DST): UTC-4 (EDT)
- ZIP code: 43515
- Area code: 419
- FIPS code: 39-21616
- GNIS feature ID: 2398710
- Website: https://www.villageofdelta.org/

Delta is a village in Fulton County, Ohio, United States. The population was 3,316 at the 2020 census.

== History ==
The first settlement at Delta was made in the 1830s. A post office called Delta has been in operation since 1837. The village was incorporated about 1863.

== Geography ==
According to the United States Census Bureau, the village has a total area of 2.67 square miles (6.92 km^{2}), all land. Delta lies within the watershed of the Maumee River. Bad Creek, a tributary of the Maumee River, flows through the village. Alternate U.S. 20 and State Route 2 pass through the village in an east–west direction. State Route 109 goes through the village in a north–south direction. The Ohio Turnpike runs in an east–west direction approximately two miles north of the village. There is an interchange at the intersection of State Route 109 and the Ohio Turnpike.

== Demographics ==
Historical population
| Census | Pop. | Note | %± |
|---|---|---|---|
| 1870 | 753 | | — |
| 1880 | 859 | | 14.1% |
| 1890 | 1,132 | | 31.8% |
| 1900 | 1,230 | | 8.7% |
| 1910 | 1,689 | | 37.3% |
| 1920 | 1,543 | | −8.6% |
| 1930 | 1,778 | | 15.2% |
| 1940 | 1,773 | | −0.3% |
| 1950 | 2,120 | | 19.6% |
| 1960 | 2,376 | | 12.1% |
| 1970 | 2,544 | | 7.1% |
| 1980 | 2,831 | | 11.3% |
| 1990 | 2,849 | | 0.6% |
| 2000 | 2,930 | | 2.8% |
| 2010 | 3,103 | | 5.9% |
| 2020 | 3,316 | | 6.9% |
| 2023 (est.) | 3,301 | ▼ | −0.5% |
U.S. Decennial Census

=== 2020 census ===
As of the 2020 census, Delta had a population of 3,316. The median age was 36.1 years. 27.0% of residents were under the age of 18 and 15.3% of residents were 65 years of age or older. For every 100 females there were 97.7 males, and for every 100 females age 18 and over there were 97.6 males age 18 and over.

0.0% of residents lived in urban areas, while 100.0% lived in rural areas.

There were 1,278 households in Delta, of which 33.8% had children under the age of 18 living in them. Of all households, 46.4% were married-couple households, 19.6% were households with a male householder and no spouse or partner present, and 27.7% were households with a female householder and no spouse or partner present. About 27.4% of all households were made up of individuals and 12.0% had someone living alone who was 65 years of age or older.

There were 1,370 housing units, of which 6.7% were vacant. The homeowner vacancy rate was 0.6% and the rental vacancy rate was 7.0%.

Racial composition as of the 2020 census
| Race | Number | Percent |
|---|---|---|
| White | 2,958 | 89.2% |
| Black or African American | 12 | 0.4% |
| American Indian and Alaska Native | 14 | 0.4% |
| Asian | 11 | 0.3% |
| Native Hawaiian and Other Pacific Islander | 0 | 0.0% |
| Some other race | 67 | 2.0% |
| Two or more races | 254 | 7.7% |
| Hispanic or Latino (of any race) | 324 | 9.8% |

=== 2010 census ===
As of the census of 2010, there were 3,103 people, 1,203 households, and 842 families living in the village. The population density was 1,162.2 inhabitants per square mile (448.7/km^{2}). There were 1,293 housing units at an average density of 484.3 per square mile (187.0/km^{2}). The racial makeup of the village was 96.1% White, 0.4% African American, 0.5% Native American, 0.5% Asian, 0.9% from other races, and 1.6% from two or more races. Hispanic or Latino of any race were 5.3% of the population.

There were 1,203 households, of which 37.0% had children under the age of 18 living with them, 51.4% were married couples living together, 13.9% had a female householder with no husband present, 4.7% had a male householder with no wife present, and 30.0% were non-families. 26.0% of all households were made up of individuals, and 9.9% had someone living alone who was 65 years of age or older. The average household size was 2.58 and the average family size was 3.10.

The median age in the village was 35.5 years. 27.7% of residents were under the age of 18; 8.9% were between the ages of 18 and 24; 25.8% were from 25 to 44; 25.4% were from 45 to 64; and 12.2% were 65 years of age or older. The gender makeup of the village was 48.4% male and 51.6% female.

=== 2000 census ===
As of the census of 2000, there were 2,930 people, 1,134 households, and 831 families living in the village. The population density was 1,126.7 inhabitants per square mile (435.0/km^{2}). There were 1,193 housing units at an average density of 458.7 per square mile (177.1/km^{2}). The racial makeup of the village was 95.94% White, 0.10% African American, 0.55% Native American, 0.10% Asian, 0.20% Pacific Islander, 1.98% from other races, and 1.13% from two or more races. Hispanic or Latino of any race were 5.49% of the population.

There were 1,134 households, out of which 38.4% had children under the age of 18 living with them, 56.5% were married couples living together, 11.8% had a female householder with no husband present, and 26.7% were non-families. 22.6% of all households were made up of individuals, and 10.1% had someone living alone who was 65 years of age or older. The average household size was 2.58 and the average family size was 3.01.

In the village, the population was spread out, with 28.7% under the age of 18, 7.5% from 18 to 24, 30.3% from 25 to 44, 20.5% from 45 to 64, and 13.0% who were 65 years of age or older. The median age was 35 years. For every 100 females there were 94.4 males. For every 100 females age 18 and over, there were 88.6 males.

The median income for a household in the village was $41,920, and the median income for a family was $50,543. Males had a median income of $35,784 versus $25,552 for females. The per capita income for the village was $18,959. About 6.9% of families and 9.2% of the population were below the poverty line, including 12.7% of those under age 18 and 7.1% of those age 65 or over.

== Education ==
Delta has a system of public schools known as the Pike-Delta-York Local School District. This was the consolidation of the village school in Delta and the two surrounding township schools (Pike Township and York Township.) After the consolidation, Pike and York were closed, and the only remaining schools are in Delta. Delta High School serves the entire district as its lone secondary school.

The village operates a public lending library.

== Notable people ==
- Steve Buehrer, Ohio politician
- Charles Haubiel, composer
- Nate Kmic, football player
- Mary Wood-Allen, doctor and social reformer
