= Tiffin River =

River in Ohio, United States

Coordinates: 41.2792°N 84.3844°W

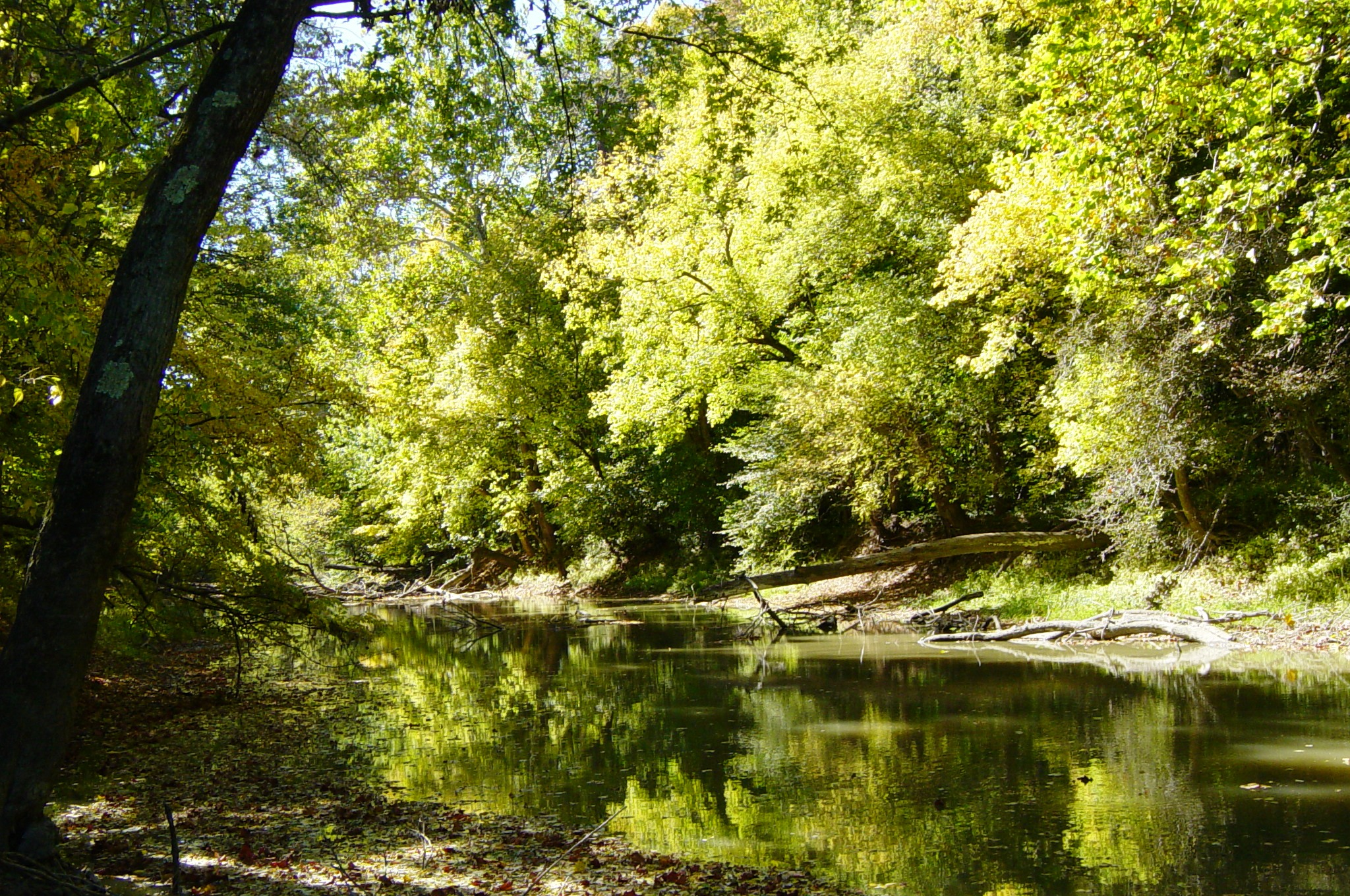
The Tiffin River viewed from Goll Woods State Nature Preserve.

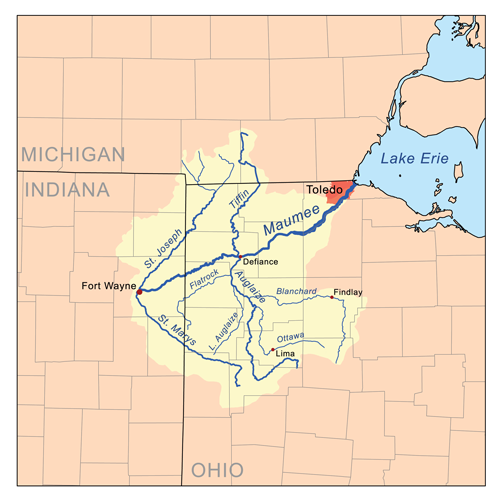
Map of the Maumee River watershed showing Tiffin River.

The Tiffin River is a 54.9-mile-long (88.4 km) tributary of the Maumee River in northwestern Ohio in the United States. Headwater tributaries of the river rise in southeastern Michigan. The river drains a primarily rural farming region in the watershed of Lake Erie. Early French traders called the river Crique Féve, translated as Bean Creek, due to the natural growth of bean plants along the shores.

The stream was renamed officially as the Tiffin River in 1822 after Edward Tiffin, the first governor of the state of Ohio. The 56.3-mile-long (90.6 km) upper section of the river north of the Ohio Turnpike is still referred to as Bean Creek.

== Course ==
Bean Creek, the name of the upper half of the Tiffin River, flows from Devils Lake in the Irish Hills region of southeastern Michigan. It travels west through the village of Addison before meeting Posey Creek on the right bank. Turning south, the stream travels 8 miles (13 km) before merging with Hillsdale Creek just north of the city of Hudson. From there it flows southwest toward the unincorporated settlements of Medina and Canandaigua. At Canandaigua, Bean Creek comes within a mile of Black Creek, a tributary of the Raisin River. Flowing south past Canandaigua, the Bean Creek travels another 5 miles (8 km) before picking up Lime Creek a mile north of the city of Morenci. After picking up Silver Creek toward the south end of Morenci, Bean Creek enters Fulton County, Ohio. Following a generally straight course, Bean Creek is joined by Old Bean Creek at the Tiffin River Wildlife Area 9 miles (14 km) southwest of Morenci.

Beginning a highly meandering course, the stream, now known as the Tiffin River, continues southwest toward the village of Stryker. It turns to the south for its lower 35 miles (56 km), joining the Maumee River from the north 2 miles (3 km) west of Defiance.

== See also ==
- List of Michigan rivers
- List of rivers of Ohio
