= Archbold, Ohio =

- Village
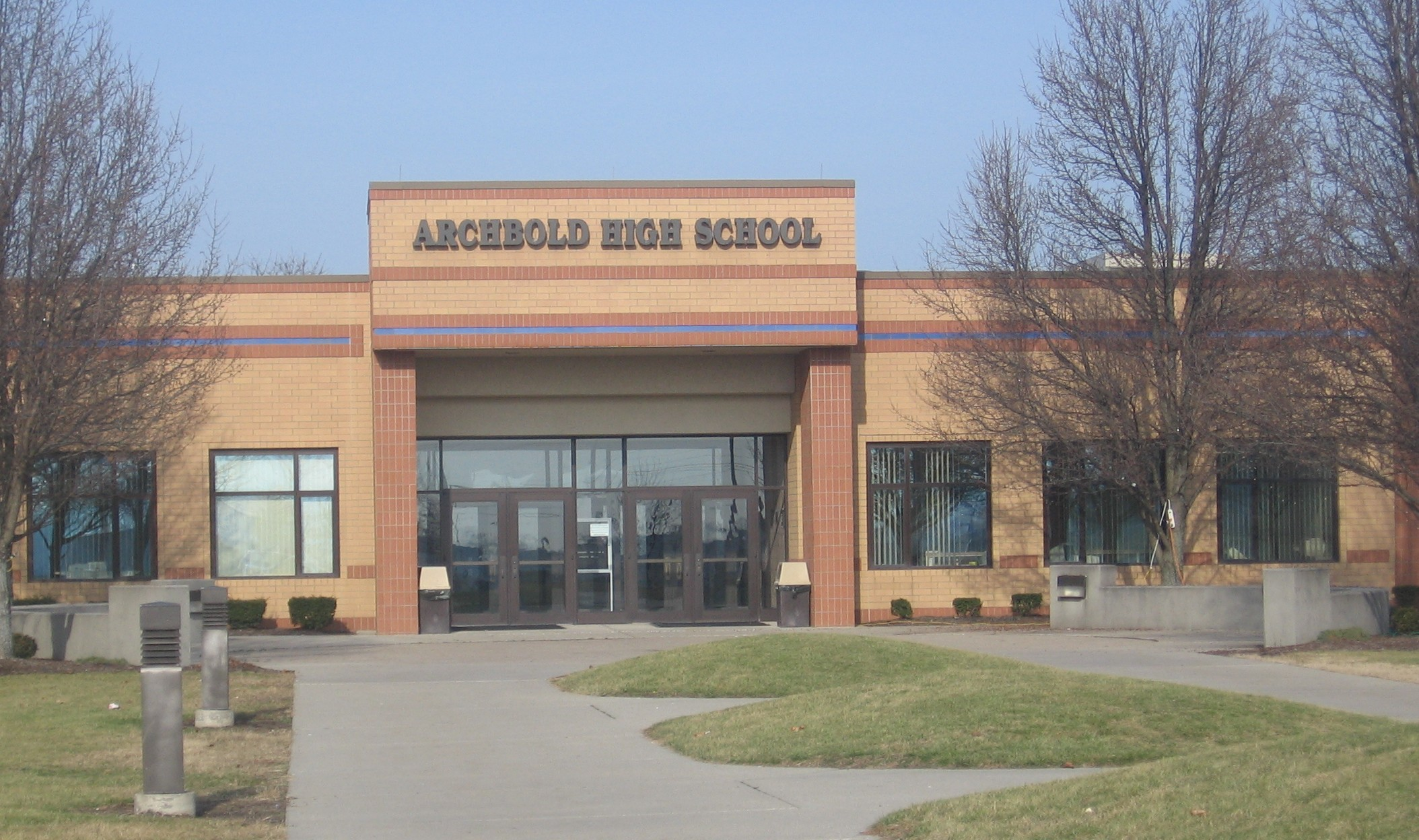
- Archbold High School
- Motto: "Live Archbold!"
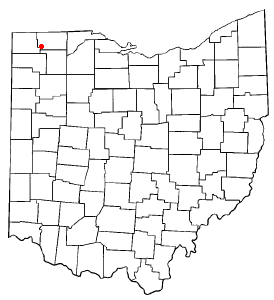
- Location of Archbold, Ohio

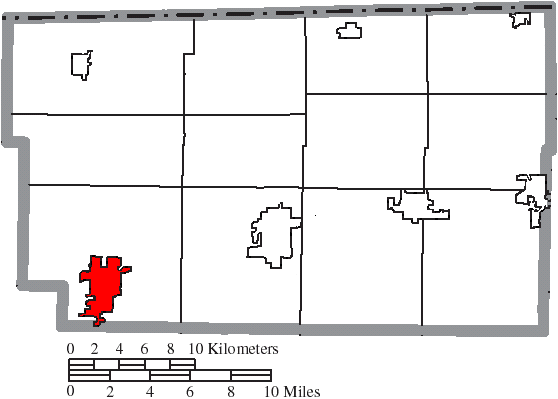
- Location of Archbold in Fulton County
- Coordinates: 41°30′50″N 84°18′20″W
- Country: United States
- State: Ohio
- County: Fulton
- Township: German
- Founded: 1866

Government
  - Mayor: Brad Grime
  - Village Administrator: Donna Dettling

Area
  - Total: 5.05 sq mi (13.09 km^{2})
  - Land: 4.93 sq mi (12.77 km^{2})
  - Water: 0.12 sq mi (0.32 km^{2})
- Elevation: 735 ft (224 m)

Population (2020)
  - Total: 4,516
  - Estimate (2023): 4,447
  - Density: 915.9/sq mi (353.65/km^{2})
- Time zone: UTC-5 (Eastern (EST))
  - Summer (DST): UTC-4 (EDT)
- ZIP code: 43502
- Area codes: 419, 567
- FIPS code: 39-02344
- GNIS feature ID: 2397979
- Website: www.archbold.com

Archbold is a village in Fulton County, Ohio, United States. The population was 4,516 at the 2020 census. Located about 40 miles (64 km) southwest of Toledo, Archbold is home to Northwest State Community College.

== History ==
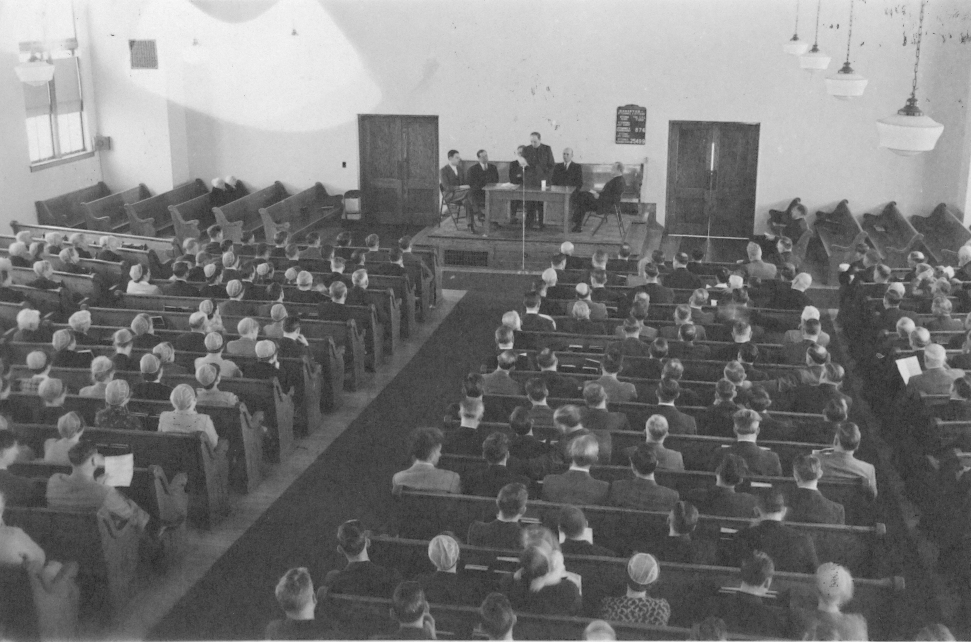
The Industrial Relations Committee in Archbold Ohio, 1947.

Archbold was founded in 1855 when the railroad was extended to that point. The village was probably named for John Archbald, a railroad promoter, though another tradition is that the name is an amalgamation of Arch and Bald, two other railroad officials. A post office called Archbold has been in operation since 1855.

It was designated a Tree City USA by the National Arbor Day Foundation in 1983.

=== 1948 bobsleigh-train accident ===
At around 2:30 PM on Sunday, January 4, 1948, a 45-year-old farmer was driving his tractor that was pulling thirteen children that were riding on his lowing-slung farm utility bobsleigh amidst a light snowstorm when he stopped at an unguarded railroad crossing out of precaution. After looking in all directions, he proceeded to cross, when he was halfway over, he "froze stiff" at the sight of an oncoming Chicago-bound New York Central Railroad passenger train that was travelling at an estimated 80 mph (around 125 kph). The engineer of the train stated that he spotted the tractor and attached bobsleigh more than a quarter of a mile away and despite knowing that his response would be too late, he proceeded to activate both the warning whistle and emergency brakes.

Ten children were pronounced dead at the scene while the other three survived despite being moderately injured. All of the deceased were siblings from three separate farming families. Two of the three injured passengers were the tractor operator's children. The largest loss of life in Fulton County history sent shockwaves across Ohio and across the country.

In an investigation made and concluded by the Fulton County Police Department, the primary cause of the accident was the engineer's failure of judgement.

== Geography ==
According to the United States Census Bureau, the village has a total area of 5.07 square miles (13.13 km^{2}), of which, 4.93 square miles (12.77 km^{2}) is land and 0.14 square miles (0.36 km^{2}) is water.

== Demographics ==
Historical population
Census	Pop.	Note	%±
1870	373		—
1880	635		70.2%
1890	780		22.8%
1900	958		22.8%
1910	1,082		12.9%
1920	1,125		4.0%
1930	1,185		5.3%
1940	1,236		4.3%
1950	1,486		20.2%
1960	2,348		58.0%
1970	3,047		29.8%
1980	3,318		8.9%
1990	3,440		3.7%
2000	4,290		24.7%
2010	4,346		1.3%
2020	4,516		3.9%
2023 (est.)	4,447	▼	−1.5%
U.S. Decennial Census

=== 2020 census ===
As of the 2020 census, Archbold had a population of 4,516. The median age was 43.4 years. 23.3% of residents were under the age of 18 and 25.0% of residents were 65 years of age or older. For every 100 females there were 87.9 males, and for every 100 females age 18 and over there were 85.0 males age 18 and over.

0.0% of residents lived in urban areas, while 100.0% lived in rural areas.

There were 1,881 households in Archbold, of which 26.6% had children under the age of 18 living in them. Of all households, 50.5% were married-couple households, 15.4% were households with a male householder and no spouse or partner present, and 29.5% were households with a female householder and no spouse or partner present. About 33.4% of all households were made up of individuals and 19.7% had someone living alone who was 65 years of age or older.

There were 1,986 housing units, of which 5.3% were vacant. The homeowner vacancy rate was 1.6% and the rental vacancy rate was 2.0%.

Racial composition as of the 2020 census
Race	Number	Percent
White	3,802	84.2%
Black or African American	35	0.8%
American Indian and Alaska Native	18	0.4%
Asian	20	0.4%
Native Hawaiian and Other Pacific Islander	1	0.0%
Some other race	310	6.9%
Two or more races	330	7.3%
Hispanic or Latino (of any race)	704	15.6%

=== 2010 census ===
As of the census of 2010, there were 4,346 people, 1,760 households, and 1,178 families living in the village. The population density was 881.5 inhabitants per square mile (340.3/km^{2}). There were 1,876 housing units at an average density of 380.5 per square mile (146.9/km^{2}). The racial makeup of the village was 90.5% White, 0.5% African American, 0.5% Native American, 0.9% Asian, 5.6% from other races, and 2.0% from two or more races. Hispanic or Latino of any race were 16.8% of the population.

There were 1,760 households, of which 31.1% had children under the age of 18 living with them, 54.7% were married couples living together, 9.4% had a female householder with no husband present, 2.8% had a male householder with no wife present, and 33.1% were non-families. 29.1% of all households were made up of individuals, and 13.6% had someone living alone who was 65 years of age or older. The average household size was 2.41 and the average family size was 2.99.

The median age in the village was 41 years. 25.7% of residents were under the age of 18; 5.8% were between the ages of 18 and 24; 23.5% were from 25 to 44; 25.1% were from 45 to 64; and 19.9% were 65 years of age or older. The gender makeup of the village was 46.9% male and 53.1% female.

=== 2000 census ===
As of the census of 2000, there were 4,290 people, 1,717 households, and 1,167 families living in the village. The population density was 1,009.2 inhabitants per square mile (389.7/km^{2}). There were 1,807 housing units at an average density of 425.1 per square mile (164.1/km^{2}). The racial makeup of the village was 91.54% White, 0.47% African American, 0.33% Native American, 0.51% Asian, 5.78% from other races, and 1.38% from two or more races. Hispanic or Latino of any race were 12.42% of the population.

There were 1,717 households, out of which 33.0% had children under the age of 18 living with them, 58.0% were married couples living together, 7.3% had a female householder with no husband present, and 32.0% were non-families. 29.8% of all households were made up of individuals, and 15.1% had someone living alone who was 65 years of age or older. The average household size was 2.44, and the average family size was 3.05.

In the village, the population was spread out, with 26.4% under the age of 18, 7.1% from 18 to 24, 26.3% from 25 to 44, 20.1% from 45 to 64, and 20.0% who were 65 years of age or older. The median age was 38 years. For every 100 females there were 89.7 males. For every 100 females age 18 and over, there were 83.9 males.

The median income for a household in the village was $43,155, and the median income for a family was $52,050. Males had a median income of $37,243 versus $25,990 for females. The per capita income for the village was $21,971. About 1.8% of families and 4.4% of the population were below the poverty line, including 4.8% of those under age 18 and 3.1% of those age 65 or over.

== Culture ==
Archbold Community Theatre began informally in the late 1970's as an offshoot of the Archbold Friends of the Arts, and was officially incorporated in 1980. In 1999, ACT purchased Giffey Hall in Ridgeville Corners, which is its permanent home.

Black Swamp Arts Council, founded in 1999, is a non-profit arts organizations that provides a wide range of arts opportunities for all ages in NW Ohio. They partner with schools, and other arts and community organizations to present quality, affordable art-filled experiences.

Archbold Parks and Recreation sponsors art and music classes throughout the year in the village parks. Since 1999, the Route 66 Bash (formerly the Backyard Bash), has been a popular annual concert in the downtown area featuring popular country artists.

== Education ==
Archbold is home to Archbold Area Local School District, the only school district in the village of Archbold. The District includes the Archbold High School. Four County Career Center is a career based technical school for students currently in their junior or senior year. Northwest State Community College a local community college.

The village has a public lending library.

== Media ==
The Archbold Buckeye is a weekly newspaper begun by W.O Taylor in 1905. Over the years, The Buckeye has won numerous state awards, including the 2023 Newspaper of the Year in Division C.

Since 1959, Farmland News has provided news and information with an emphasis on farming and agriculture.

WMTR Radio has been locally owned and operated since 1968 by the Northwestern Ohio Broadcasting Corporation. The station plays a mix of music from the 70s to the 90s, covers local news, and provides live broadcasts of community and high school sporting events. WMTR is the NW Ohio home of the Detroit Tigers. NOBC also owns and operates 94.3 The Buck, a mainstream country music station.

== Notable people ==
- Sam Hornish Jr., Indy Car Champion & NASCAR driver/Winner 2006 Indy 500
- Jon Lugbill, Olympic slalom canoeist and slalom canoe world champion
- Ron Lugbill, slalom canoeist
- Bonnie Milligan, 76th Tony Awards winner
- Erie J. Sauder, inventor of the "knock-down" ready-to-assemble furniture.
