= Emery, Ohio =

- Ghost town
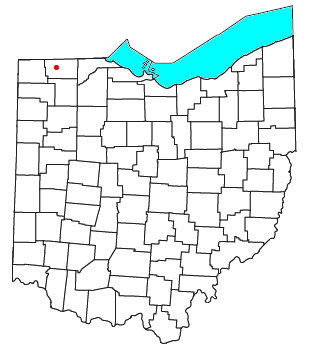
- Location of Emery, Ohio
- Coordinates: 41°35′25″N 84°11′34″W
- Country: United States
- State: Ohio
- County: Fulton
- Township: Dover

Government
  - First Postmaster, 1846: Amos Gay
  - Postmaster at 1861 reopening: William Waid

Emery is an extinct town in Dover Township, Fulton County, Ohio. It is located near present-day Tedrow, Ohio.

== History ==
On July 11, 1846, Amos Gay, as the first postmaster, opened the Emery post office. It closed January 23, 1861, but reopened later that year on May 23, with William Waid serving as the postmaster. It remained open until August 31, 1903. A letter from the Civil War era, dated from 1861 and addressed to the Emery Post office, preserved in the Searls Family Papers, is held at Bowling Green State University at the Center for Archival Collections.

Emery is listed in an 1860 business directory, and in an 1870 Post Office directory. Will and Emma Knapp are listed as residents of Emery, Ohio in a family genealogical record. Emery also made its way on an 1898 Ohio railroad map, (albeit mistakenly in the place of Spring Hill, apparently a mistake of the mapmaker. Also, the newly mapped railroad, which runs north from Wauseon towards Oakshade, mistakenly jogs east towards a station at Ottokee, drawn in the actual location of Winameg.)

It was located only a short distance from Tedrow, about 1.5 miles southwest. There are no remaining structures of the town. The Ancestry website states that it was located in the "northwest one-quarter of the southwest one-quarter of Section 4" of Dover Township, which would place it near County Road H (formerly West Unity-Swanton Road) between County Road 17 (formerly Hartman-Inlet Road) and County Road 16 (formerly Lena-Morenci Road). According to the Fulton County Plat Directory, this places Emery possibly in the path of, or just north of, the Ohio Turnpike.

== Gallery ==
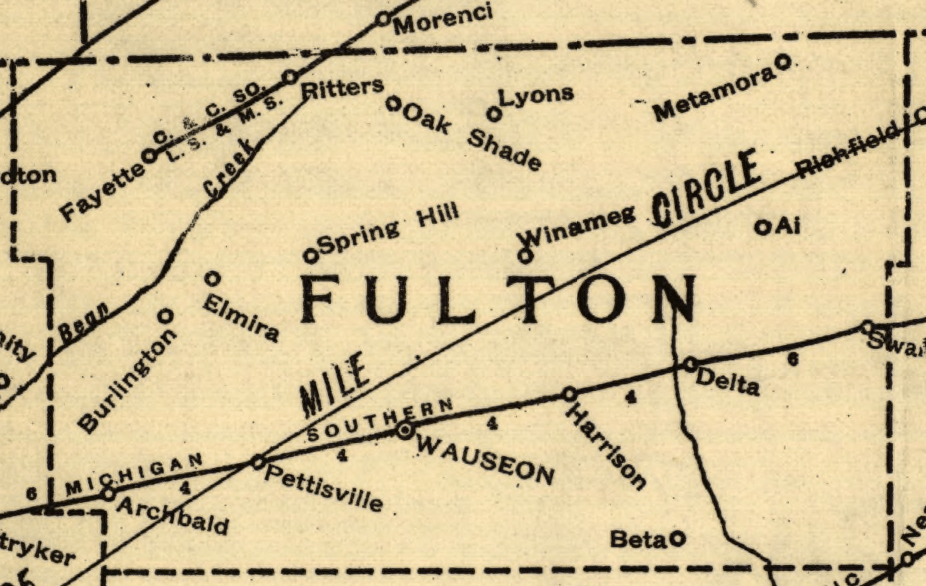
1890 railroad map. Emery would be located near the "U" in "Fulton," just southwest of "Spring Hill." Note that Beta, another extinct town in Fulton County, is also drawn on the map.

1898 railroad map. Emery is on the map, mistakenly labeled in place of Spring Hill. Emery would actually be located closer to the top of the "L" in "Fulton."
