= Julia Carter Aldrich =

American author, editor

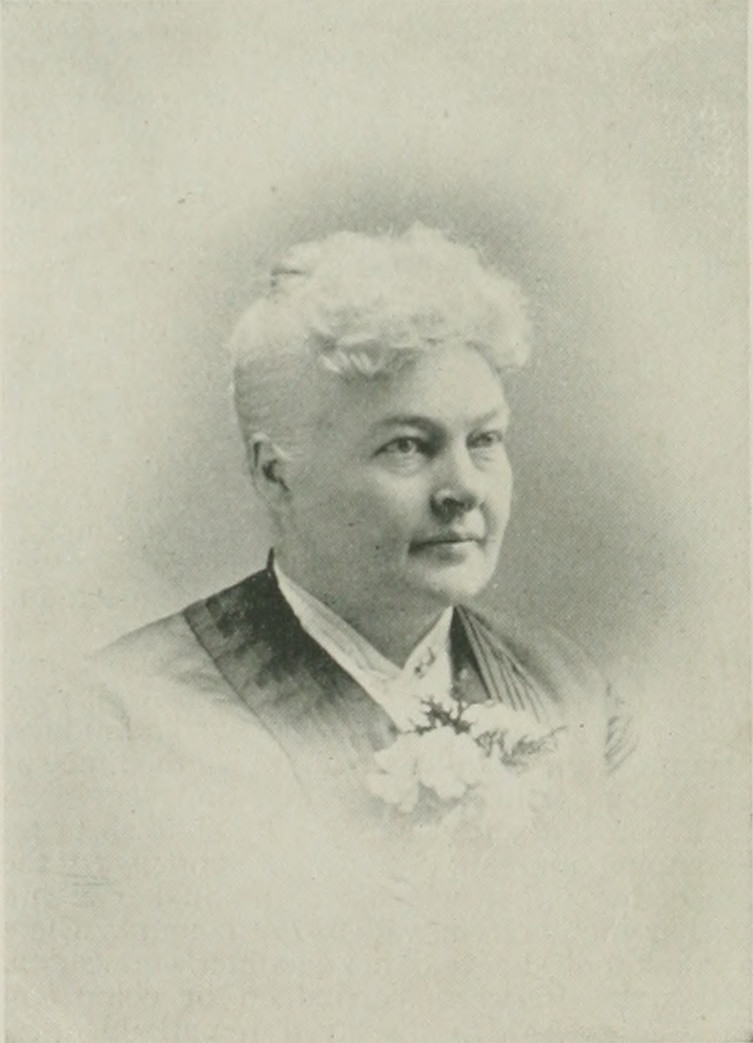
- Photo in A Woman of the Century
- Born: Julia Carter; January 28, 1834; Liverpool, Ohio, US
- Died: August 26, 1924 (aged 90); Wauseon, Ohio
- Resting place: Wauseon Union Cemetery
- Occupations: author; editor
- Spouse: Joseph Aldrich (m. 1854; died 1889)
- Writing career
- Pen name: Petresia Peters
- Notable work: Hazel bloom

Julia Carter Aldrich (née, Carter; pen name, Petresia Peters; January 28, 1834 – August 26, 1924) was a 19th-century American author and editor from Ohio. She served as the state's vice-president of the Western Association of Writers. As editor of the National Grange, the paper connected Aldrich with readers all over the United States.

== Early life and education ==
Julia Carter was born in Liverpool, Ohio, on January 28, 1834. She was the fifth in a family of seven children. Her paternal ancestors were New Englanders of English descent. Her mother's parents, born in Richmond, Virginia, were of Scotch and German descent. Carter began to write at a young age, first publishing at the age of fourteen.

Her school-days were marked by thorough and rapid proficiency.

== Career ==
When Aldrich was seventeen, she began to teach in a large village school. She continued teaching for four years. During this period of study and teaching, she frequently wrote verse and prose, which were published in various periodicals.

In July 1853, Aldrich's brother, Jabez William Carter, of Medina County, Ohio, came to Ottokee, Ohio, and bought a printery there. He began publishing the Fulton County Union, a business he reportedly enjoyed, having been connected with a printing office since his boyhood. He was then twenty-six years old. He wrote his mother, a widow, his father having died in 1852, to join the family—Charles, Julia, Julius and Margaret—in Ottokee for the winter. They arrived early in November and were taken to the Henry Taylor Hotel until their goods arrived.

In the spring of 1854, Joseph Aldrich was engaged to teach in Springhills, Ohio, and Julia Carter in Ottokee. Her brothers, Charles and Julius Carter, assisted her brother Jabez in the printing office. Everyone in the family liked Ottokee, and all had employment, so none cared to return to Medina County. The mother went back and sold the place, and returning to Ottokee, she bought a home there.

During the early years of her married life, Aldrich did not write much. Eventually, she returned to writing. She wrote for The Home Circle under various pen names, "Petresia Peters" being the best known.

Aldrich was one of the first contributors to the press in Fulton County. She and her husband were among the first school teachers. While Aldrich was an occasional contributor to various publications, she also had a volume of verse from her earlier writings, entitled Hazel Bloom.

== Personal life ==
On October 3, 1854, she married Joseph D. Aldrich, and they lived in their own home in Ottokee. In 1858, they sold the Ottokee property and bought the Quaker Wright Farm on the north line of Clinton Township. Their three sons, Amos Eugene, Fred Hampson and Benjamin F. Aldrich, were born there, and Joseph died there in 1889. She associated herself with reformatory measures.

Joseph Aldrich died in 1889, at their country place, "Maple Grove Home," near Wauseon, Ohio. Julia Carter Aldrich died August 26, 1924, in Wauseon and is buried at Wauseon Union Cemetery.

== Selected works ==
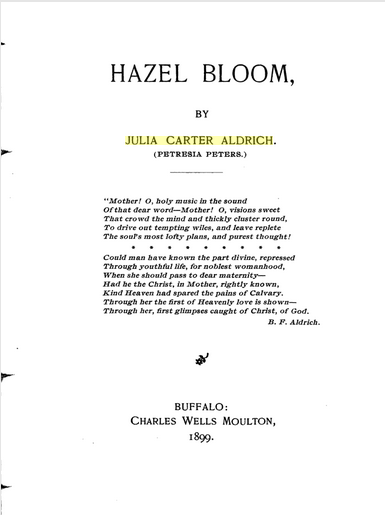
Hazel Bloom

- 1899, Hazel bloom
- 1914, A memory of eighteen hundred sixty-five a tribute
