= Dover Township, Fulton County, Ohio =

Township in Ohio, US

- Township
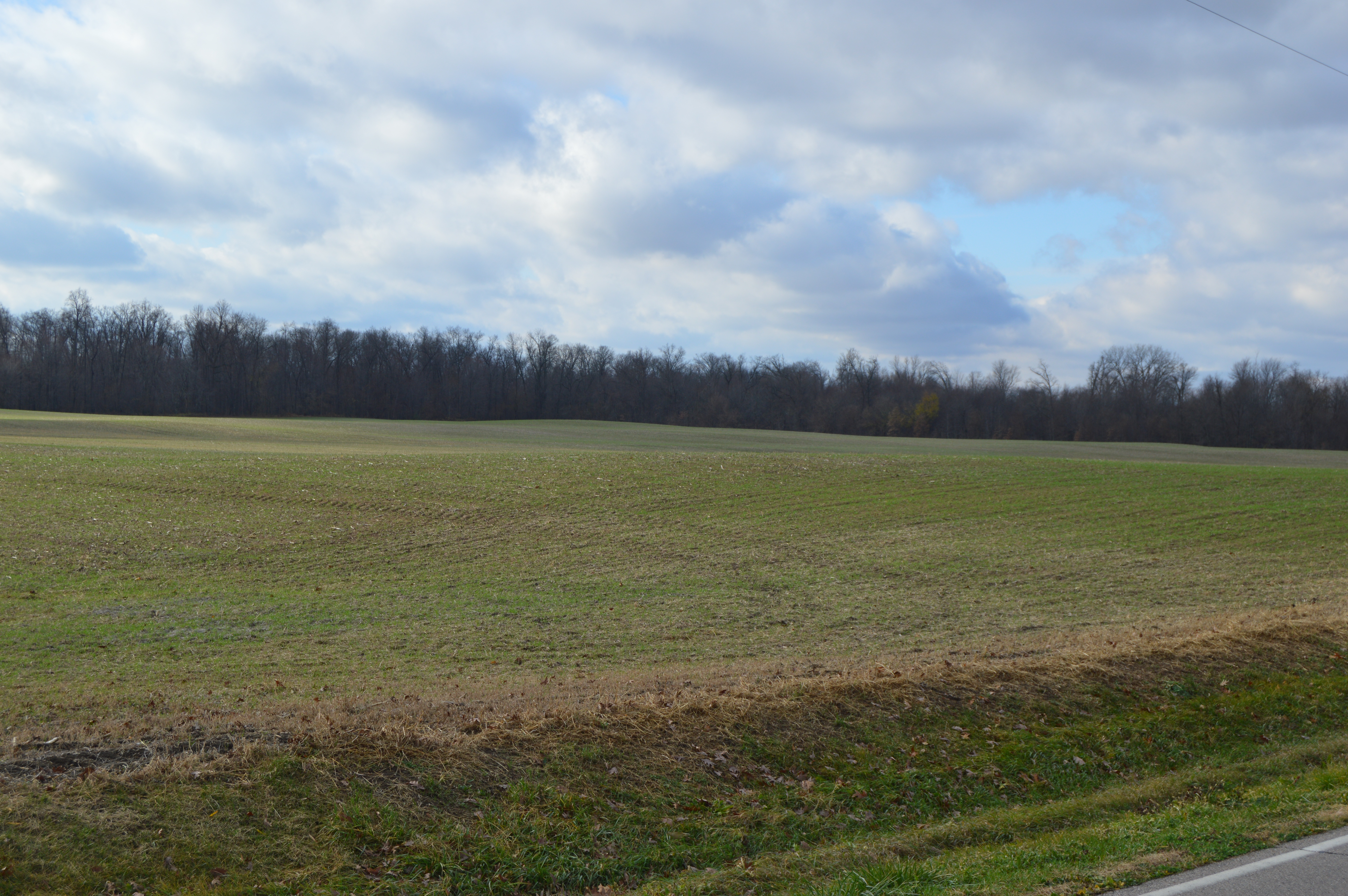
- Wheat fields on Road L

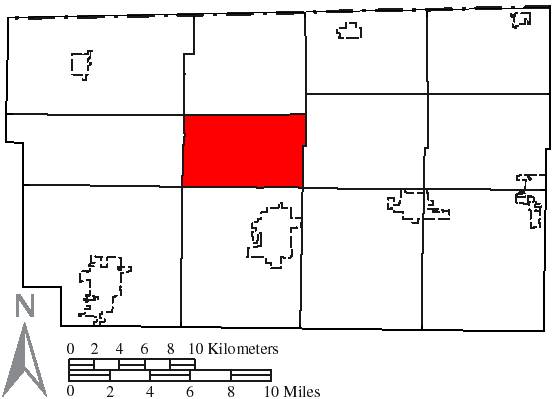
- Location of Dover Township in Fulton County
- Coordinates: 41°36′44″N 84°11′16″W
- Country: United States
- State: Ohio
- County: Fulton

Government
  - Type: Township

Area
  - Total: 21.5 sq mi (55.6 km^{2})
  - Land: 21.5 sq mi (55.6 km^{2})
  - Water: 0 sq mi (0.0 km^{2})
- Elevation: 761 ft (232 m)

Population (2020)
  - Total: 1,621
  - Density: 75.5/sq mi (29.2/km^{2})
- Time zone: UTC-5 (Eastern (EST))
  - Summer (DST): UTC-4 (EDT)
- Postal code: 43567
- Area codes: 419 and 567
- FIPS code: 39-22442
- GNIS feature ID: 1086123
- Website: https://www.fultoncountyoh.com/

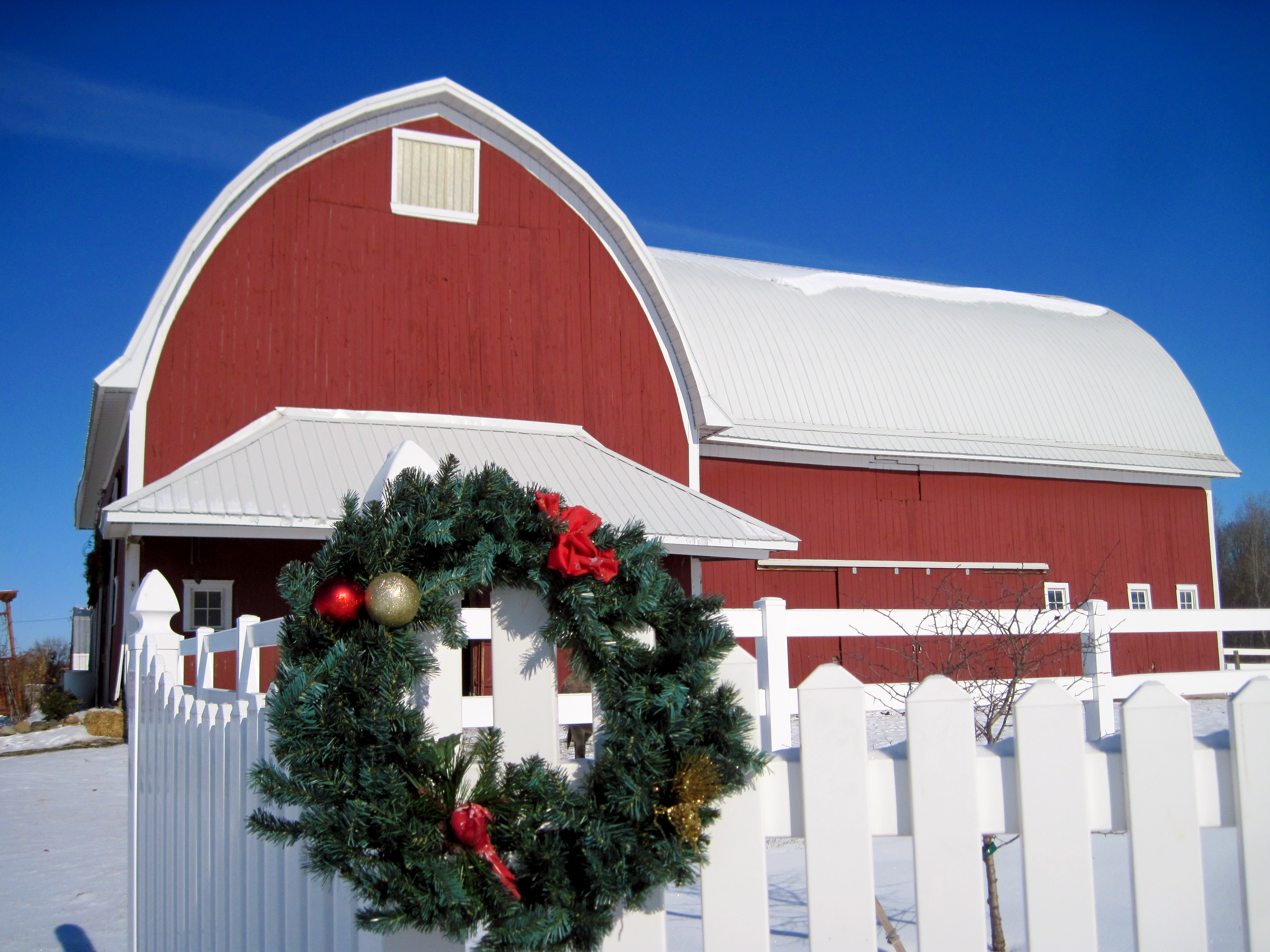
A barn in Dover Township, Fulton County, Ohio

Dover Township is one of the twelve townships of Fulton County, Ohio, United States. The 2020 census found 1,621 people in the township.

== Geography ==
Located in the central part of the county, it borders the following townships:

- Chesterfield Township - north
- Pike Township - east
- York Township - southeast corner
- Clinton Township - south
- German Township - southwest corner
- Franklin Township - west
- Gorham Township - northwest corner

It is one of only two townships in the county without a border on another county.

The following unincorporated communities are located in the township:

- Tedrow (a Census-designated place)
- Ottokee
- Emery (extinct)

Dover Township is within the Toledo Metropolitan Area.

=== Hydrology ===
Old Bean Creek, a tributary of Bean Creek, flows through the northwest corner of the township; a small portion of the township lies in its floodplain.

There are no major bodies of water in the township; however, there is a wide variety of small ponds that dot the area.

The northwestern portion of the township is drained by several small creeks that empty into Old Bean Creek, a tributary that empties into Bean Creek, also known as the Tiffin River. The southwestern part is drained by Brush Creek, which also empties into the Bean Creek/Tiffin River. The eastern portion of the township is drained by branches of Bad Creek. A small part of southern Dover Township south of Ottokee is drained by Turkeyfoot Creek. All of the water in Dover Township makes its way to the Maumee River which flows to Lake Erie.

== Name and history ==
Statewide, other Dover Townships within Ohio are located in Athens, Tuscarawas, and Union counties. Dover is a name often used in the New World, taken from the Old World location of Dover, England, a port in Kent, England.

=== Prehistory ===
==== Lake Maumee ====
Dover Township's soils are sandy. It is because all of Dover Township, lies within Ohio's Lake Plains region, which was once the bottom of an ancient lake known as Lake Maumee. As water levels rose and fell, sandy beach ridges and sand dunes formed along the shore. Contributing to the sandiness of the soils is the Defiance Moraine, an ancient glacial ridge that runs north–south through the middle of Fulton County. It was created late, perhaps during a short re-advancement of the glacier, before it began to melt and form Lake Maumee.

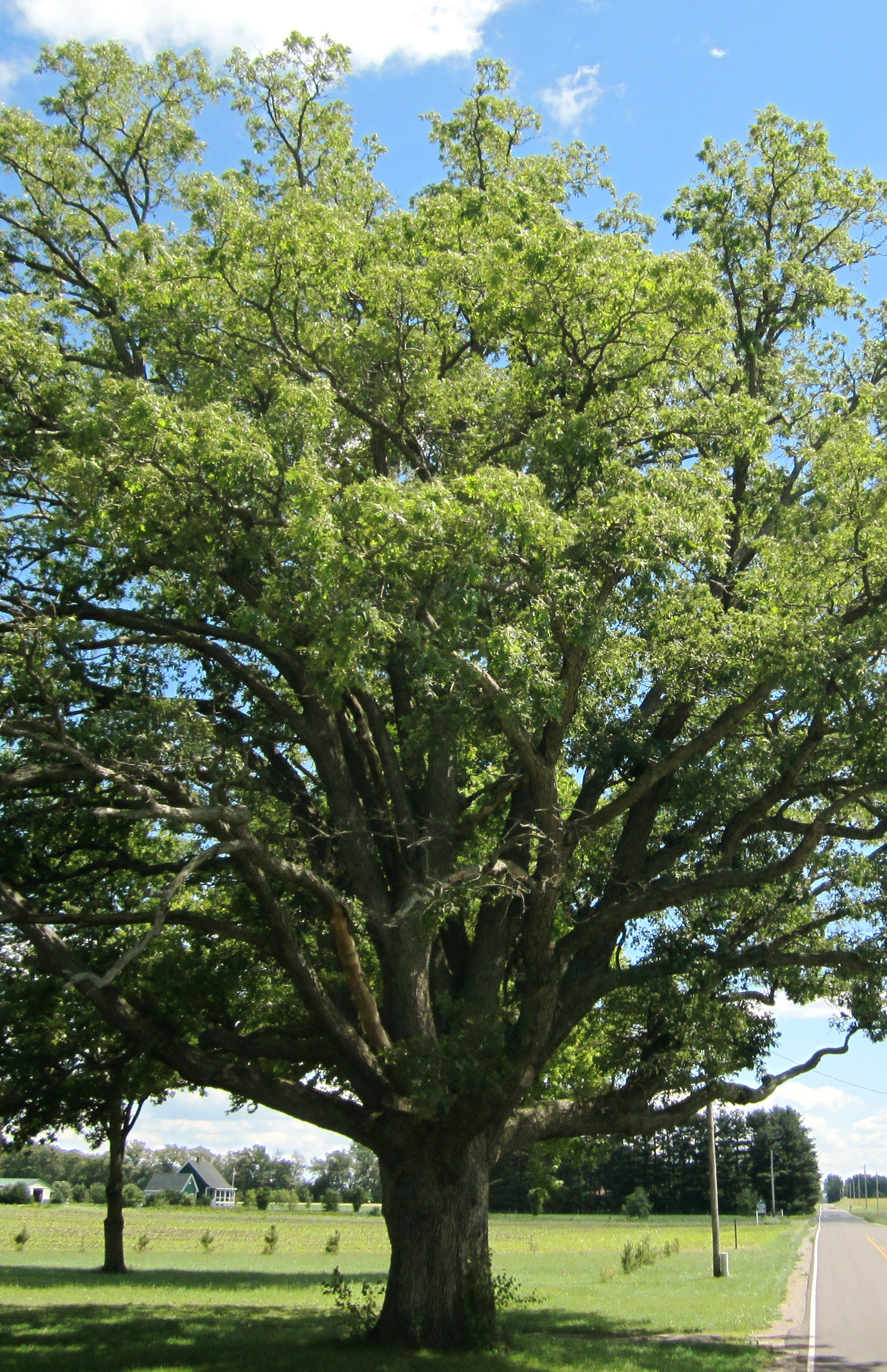
Remnant old-growth oak tree in Dover Township, reminiscent of the historical Council Oak in Winameg, Ohio, and typical of the grand flora once abundant in the Oak Openings Region

While not as fertile as clay soils, the sand is well suited to fruits and vegetables, particularly potatoes, because they are easy to dig. Potato farms are still found in the township.

==== Oak Openings Prairie ====
Dover township, particularly the eastern portion, was oak savanna, known better in Ohio by the term Oak Openings. The oak trees were set apart sparsely enough that their tops usually did not touch. The Indians created this prairie of grass, interspersed with a few trees, as a hunting grounds through which they could move efficiently.

Too, the early settlers could drive their wagons on the prairie through the open stand, in any direction among them.

There are no significant remnant prairies left preserved in the township, save for frontier cemeteries such as Ottokee cemetery. These older cemeteries remain undisturbed from pioneering days, and support prairie foliage. Included are threatened or protected state species.

==== Spring Hill ====
One the eastern part of the township is an area once known as Spring Hill. Brush Creek, which empties into the Tiffin River, finds its source here, from a spring.

The spring's clean water made the spot a favorite Indian camp-ground and resting place in their migratory hunting excursions.

Today, Spring Hill is known as Tedrow, named after a local family.

=== Settlement ===
Tracts of northwest Ohio were made available for sale to the public as the Congress Lands. What was to become Dover Township laid partly in a survey titled North and East of the First Principal Meridian, and the northern part in what was still considered Michigan, known as the Toledo Strip.

The first settler into the township was William "Long Bill" Jones. He arrived with his family in 1836 and erected the first 14 foot by 16 foot cabin with the help of two Indians near Ottokee. For the first two years of settlement, pioneers stayed in the southwest portion of the township.

==== Malaria ====
For a few years after 1838, from the beginning of summer until the first frost, over half the population of the township suffered from endemic malaria, generally known as "ague" at the time. The malaria caused fevers, chills. and the shakes. Doctors of the time reported that it took victims from three to five years to recover. Residents of northwest Ohio in and close to the Great Black Swamp often used quinine, first isolated in 1820, to treat symptoms.

==== First Election ====
Dover Township was officially organized by the Lucas County commissioners in Toledo on June 5, 1843. The first election on August 7, 1843, was held at the residence of Mortimer D. Hibbard.<

Dover was the last township organized in the county. It is also the smallest of the townships in Fulton county. The United States General Land Office set a standard that townships were to be subdivided to cover 36 square miles, but Dover occupies only 21.5 square miles.

==== Toledo War ====
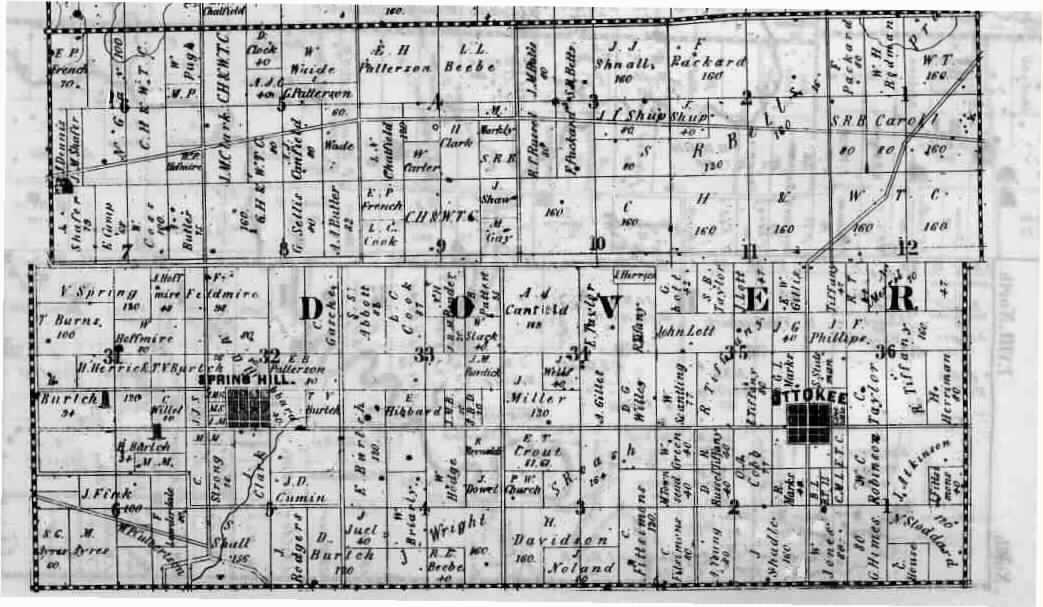
The top half of the township, formerly claimed by Michigan, is shifted, or "jogs," at the Old State Line, now County Road K

Many of the township's north–south roads, including State Route 108, "jog" where they intersect County Road K. It happens because that east–west road was the "Old State Line," originally surveyed as the Ordinance line. Michigan once considered the northern part of Ohio, a difference of about eight miles known as the Toledo Strip, as its own. Ohio and Michigan came to blows in an 1835-1836 confrontation between the state militias known as the Toledo War. There were no casualties.

==== Fulton County Fair ====
The Fulton County Fair is located in Dover Township. It was started in 1858. Another agricultural society in Dover Township was also started, in 1874 in Ottokee, Grange No. 273, one of several Grange organizations in Fulton County. However, the Grange movement finally withered with farms becoming fewer with mechanization. But the Fulton County Fair, still very much an agricultural fair, has become quite large. For a few busy days during Labor Day weekend, Dover Township hosts a temporary "city" of up to 60,792, some 50% larger than Fulton County's census of 42,698.

== Government ==
The township is governed by a three-member board of trustees, who are elected in November of odd-numbered years to a four-year term beginning on the following January 1. Two are elected in the year after the presidential election and one is elected in the year before it. There is also an elected township fiscal officer, who serves a four-year term beginning on April 1 of the year after the election, which is held in November of the year before the presidential election. Vacancies in the fiscal officership or on the board of trustees are filled by the remaining trustees.

== Public services ==
=== Public Schools ===
Six school houses once dotted the township.

Today, student are educated outside the township by the following public local school districts:

- Wauseon Exempted Village School District
- Pettisville Local School District

=== Mail ===
Historically, there have been three post offices within the township, namely, Ottokee, Tedrow, and Emery.

Today, the vast majority of the township is covered by ZIP code 43567, with mail delivered from the U.S. Post Office in Wauseon, Ohio. A few residences in a small northwest portion of the township are served by the Post Office in Fayette, Ohio, whose ZIP code is 43521.

=== Telephone ===
The first telephone in Fulton County was the Northwest Telephone Company in Wauseon. The line ran to Ottokee in 1897 as a "toll" line. The next year, the party line system was implemented.

The entire township today is still within the Wauseon telephone exchange, which is served by UTO (United Telephone Company of Ohio,) doing business as CenturyLink, with telephone numbers using the following Numbering Plan Codes:

- 419-330
- 419-335
- 419-337
- 419-388
- 419-404
- 419-583
- 419-590

=== Electric ===
Toledo Edison serves the majority of the township from Ohio State Route 108 to the west. Midwest Energy Cooperative serves a smaller eastern area.

=== Water ===
Most residents in rural Dover Township rely on wells or ponds for water. Most of the township gets its water from the Oak Openings Beach Ridge Aquifer. Eastern portions closer to the Tiffin River draw from the Lake Maumee Lacustrine Aquifer. A small northern portion of higher elevations in the north are Williams End Moraine Aquifer.

=== Highways ===
Ohio Turnpike	I-80
Ohio Turnpike	I-90
SR 108

The Ohio Turnpike was opened in western Ohio in the fall of 1955. Coincidentally, it fits neatly within the alphabetical organization of the east–west county roads, with County Road H paralleling to the south of the I-80/90 route, and County Road J to the north.

Exit 34, connecting the Turnpike to Ohio State Route 108, is in the township, beside the fairgrounds. The tollbooths have been upgraded to automated toll collection with E-ZPass and fare machines.

Ohio State Route 108 is busy, with 4930 vehicles passing per day. County Road 14, between Ottokee and Wauseon also sees high traffic, at 3444 vehicles per day.

=== Airport ===
One the eastern edge of the township is Fulton County Airport, designated as KUSE.

=== Fire and Emergency Medical Services ===
Dover Township contracts with the Wauseon Fire Department and Fulton County's Emergency Medical Services (EMS) Department located in Wauseon, Ohio. Fulton County Health Center in Wauseon offers the closest Emergency Department that is 4.8 miles, and approximately 9 minutes, from the fairgrounds within the township.

=== NOAA Weather Radio ===
Dover Township is within the purview of IWX, the National Weather Service (NWS) Forecast Office for Northern Indiana. NOAA Weather Radio (NWR) stations that cover the township include the following stations:

Station	Call Sign	Frequency (MHz)	Power (Watts)	SAME#	Weather Forecasting Office (WFO)
Angola, IN	KXI94	162.425	1000	039051	IWX (North Webster, IN)
Adrian, MI	WNG647	162.450	300	039051	DTX (White Lake, MI)
Toledo, OH	WXL51	162.500	300	039051	CLE (Cleveland, OH)
