= Fulton County Courthouse (Ohio) =

Local government building in the United States

- U.S. National Register of Historic Places
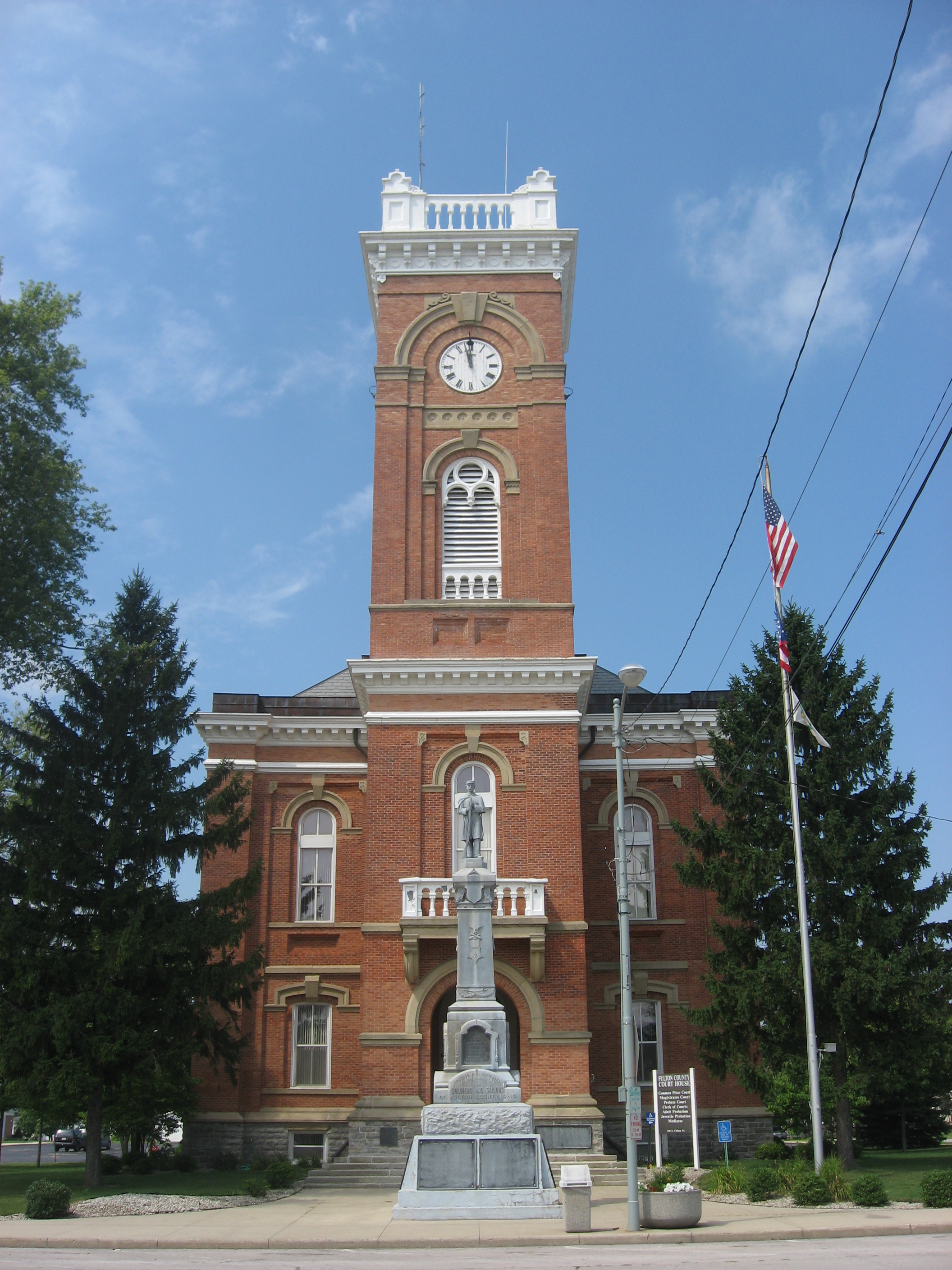
- The Fulton County Courthouse

- Location within Ohio Location within the United States
- Interactive map showing the location for Fulton County Courthouse
- Location: Wauseon, Ohio
- Coordinates: 41°32′43″N 84°7′45″W
- Built: 1872
- Architect: Alexander Voss; H.B. Bensman
- Architectural style: Italian Villa
- NRHP reference No.: 73001447
- Added to NRHP: May 7, 1973

The Fulton County Courthouse, built in 1870, is a historic courthouse building located in Wauseon, Ohio. On May 7, 1973, it was added to the National Register.

== History ==
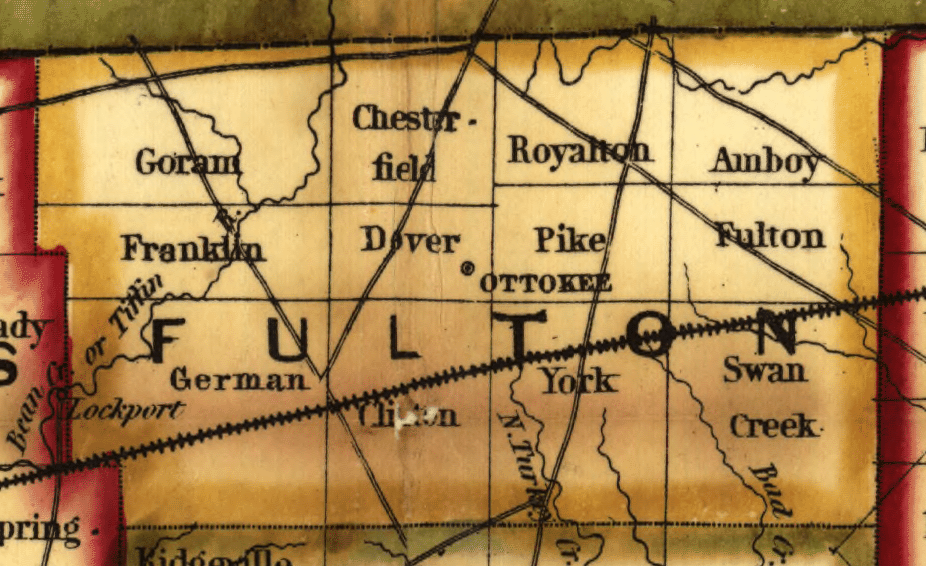
1851 Railroad map: Ottokee is the county seat of justice.

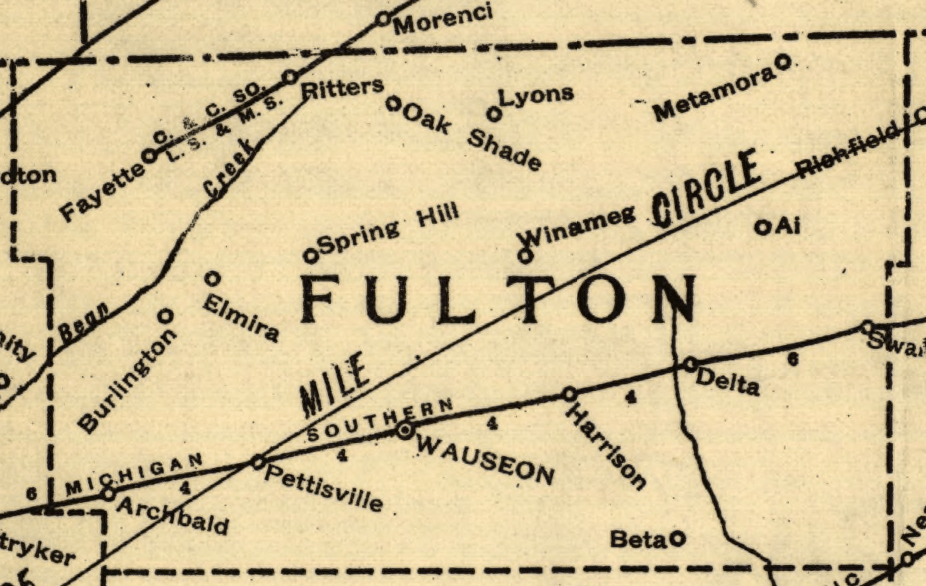
1890 Railroad map: Wauseon is now the county seat.

Fulton County was established in 1850 from parts of Williams and Lucas counties. The Ohio General Assembly appointed three commissioners to select the county seat of the newly formed county. They chose a location at the geographical center of the county, and named it "Centre."

The village was renamed Ottokee shortly thereafter at the suggestion of Col. Dresden Howard to honor the Odawa Chief Ot-to-kee. The courts were held in the home of Robert Howard until a courthouse could be constructed. In 1851 the completed two-story wood-frame structure rising to a dome. This courthouse burned in a fire in 1864 forcing the county to hastily plan a new second courthouse.

This second courthouse was constructed out of brick. The facade was punctuated by pilasters separating the arched windows. This courthouse served the county until a decision was made to move the county seat. Years after the move the old courthouse was still in use as the county infirmary.

Ottokee remained the county seat and defeated many attempts to move the courts, until 1869, when a railroad company surveyed the area and chose Wauseon as a stopping point. The county seat relocated there shortly thereafter. The same act that established the new county seat was passed, it also included $5,000 to complete a new courthouse.

This new courthouse, the third for the county, and the first for Wauseon, was completed in 1872 and is in use today. The architect, C.C. Miller, designed the courthouse in the Italianate style and Alexander Voss and H.B. Bensman were responsible for building and construction. The total cost of the courthouse was $45,722.27.

== Exterior ==
The primary bulk of the courthouse is a long rectangular block with a central projection; an addition was added to the rear of the building. The red brick structure rests on a rusticated sandstone foundation, which is pierced by small square windows. The first floor is illuminated by square windows with a slight arch and each is topped with a decorative header; the second floor windows are long arched windows with the same header treatment. Between the windows are pilasters rising from the foundation to the roofline. The hipped roof rests on an entablature decorated with dentil moldings. The roof rises to a flat roof which in turn supports a central tower with arched windows.

The central projection contains a portico with arched openings and contains the entrance. Arched windows light the second floor and a balcony is located in the front. The entablature carries over onto the projection with the tower rising for another two levels before terminating in platform lined with a balustrade. Below this platform is a four-faced clock and arched vents where the courthouse bell is kept.

== Interior ==
The building's main entry is set in the middle of the front tower. After walking through the vestibule, one can turn immediately to the left and climb a staircase to the second-story courtroom. Extensive artwork is present in the courtroom, including murals of interactions between Indians and Americans during the county's earliest years, multiple oil paintings, and wood carvings, plus a dome with stained glass.

== Renovations ==
In October 2018, major renovations began on the courthouse. Fulton County commissioners awarded a $3.86 million contract last week to Mosser Construction for the renovation work, which is expected to take 10 months, according to the commissioners’ office. The project's total budget, including design costs, was set at about $4.2 million. The project will include replacement of the heating and cooling systems, the addition of security and technology features, a new elevator that is compliant with the Americans with Disabilities Act, updates to offices, and a historic restoration of the common pleas courtroom. Among the historical renovations envisioned are original elevated theater-style seating in the common pleas courtroom, where a law library was constructed in 1958.
