= Tedrow =

Tedrow may refer to:

== Places ==
- Tedrow, Ohio
- Tedrow Glacier

== People with the surname ==
- Al Tedrow (1891–1958), American baseball player
- Irene Tedrow (1907–1995), American character actress
