= Davis College =

Davis College may refer more than one higher education institution:

- Davis College (New York)
- Davis College (Ohio)
- Davis College (Mallow), County Cork, Ireland

== See also ==
- Davis Technology College, Kaysville, Utah
