= Fulton County Fair =

Annual event in Ohio, United States

- "Top of Ohio"
- Status: Active
- Genre: County fair
- Begins: Friday before Labor Day
- Ends: Thursday after Labor Day
- Frequency: Annually
- Venue: Fulton County Fairgrounds
- Location: Wauseon, Ohio
- Coordinates: 41°35′49″N 84°09′02″W
- Country: United States
- Years active: 169
- Inaugurated: 1858
- Attendance: 298,346/week (2015 record)
- Capacity: 60,792/day (2003 record)
- Leader: Ed Miller, President
- Organizer: Fulton County Fair Board
- Website: fultoncountyfair.com

The Fulton County Fair is located in Dover Township, Fulton County on Ohio State Route 108, just north the Ohio Turnpike Exit 34 near Wauseon. It is the second largest county fair in Ohio.

== History ==
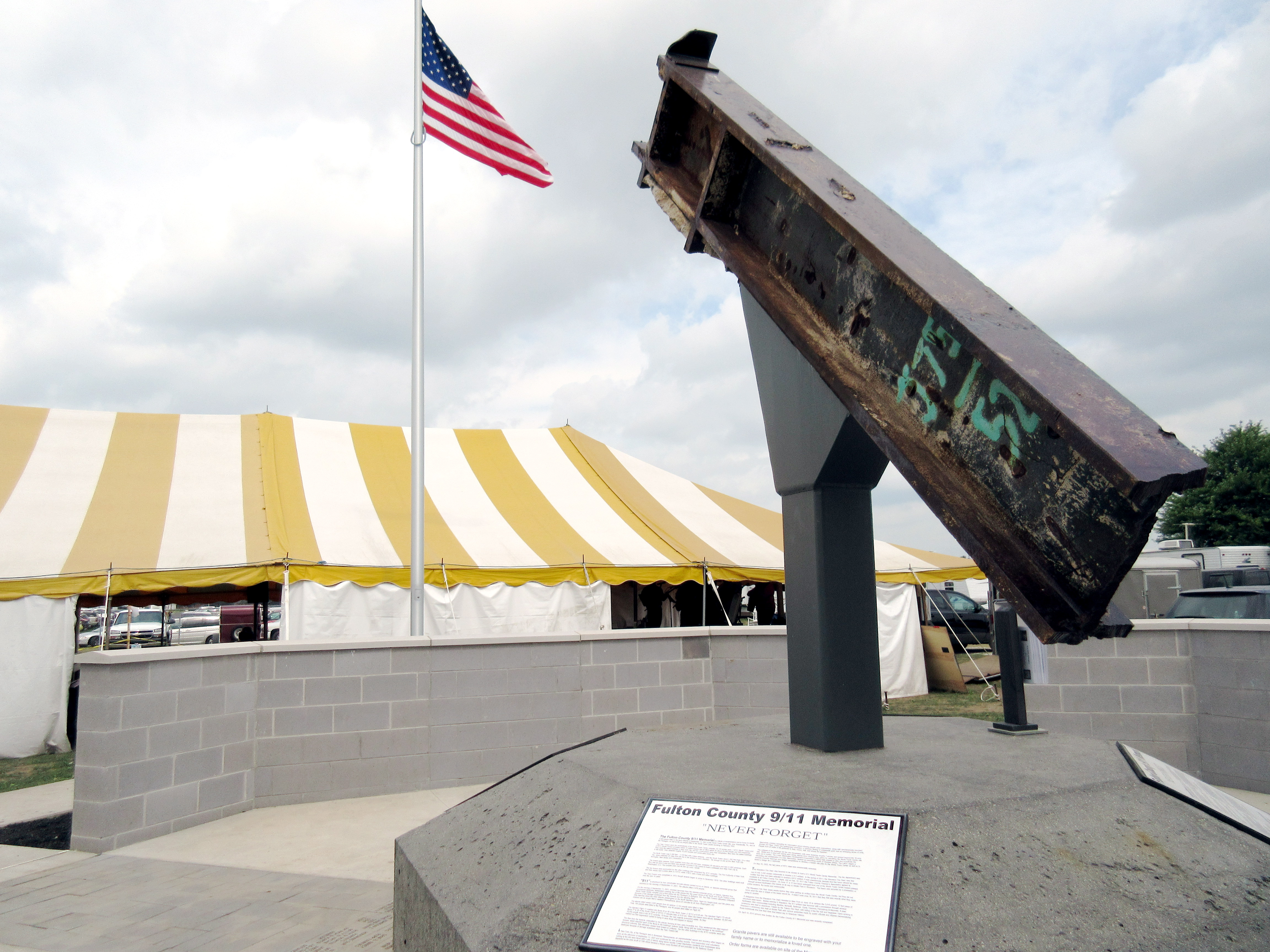
Fulton County 9/11 Memorial

The first Fulton County Fair took place in 1858. But there were no fairs from 1917 to 1918, 1942 to 1945 nor 2020.

=== Attendance ===
Weekly fair attendance broke 100,000 in 1972, and in 2014, the 157th fair, attendance was 298,346.

Daily attendance during busy days can more than double the county's population of about 40,000 to over 100,000 people. In 2025, the fair shattered its previous attendance record of 335,029 by hosting 340,193 attendees. That makes the Fulton County Fair Ohio's Second-largest fair behind the Ohio State Fair.

=== 9/11 Memorial ===
Featured on the fairgrounds is the Fulton County 9-11 Memorial, which displays a 3600-pound steel I-beam from Ground Zero. The beam arrived in 2011 and the same year, design of the memorial began. Work began in 2013 and is now complete.

== Events ==
=== Year-Round ===
Traditional events that the fairgrounds hosts annually include an MCC auction to fund humanitarian relief by the Mennonite church, the National Threshers Association Renunion, the Crosley Car Owners Club National Meet, the Antique Motorcycle Club of America Show & Race and Midwest Geobash one of the largest annual gatherings of Geocachers worldwide.

=== Fair Week ===
Fair Week traditionally begins in Fulton County on Labor Day weekend, and features popular music celebrities, tractor pulling, a demolition derby, harness racing, 4-H exhibits, livestock shows, show barns with pigs, cattle, sheep, goats, horses, llamas, chickens, geese, ducks, turkeys, and carnival games on the midway.

== Fair officers and officials ==
As of 2024, the fair officials are as follows:

• President	Ron Rice
• Vice President	Scott Smallman
• Treasurer	Kelly Bentley
• Treasurer	Steve Richer
