= Dresden Howard =

American statesman

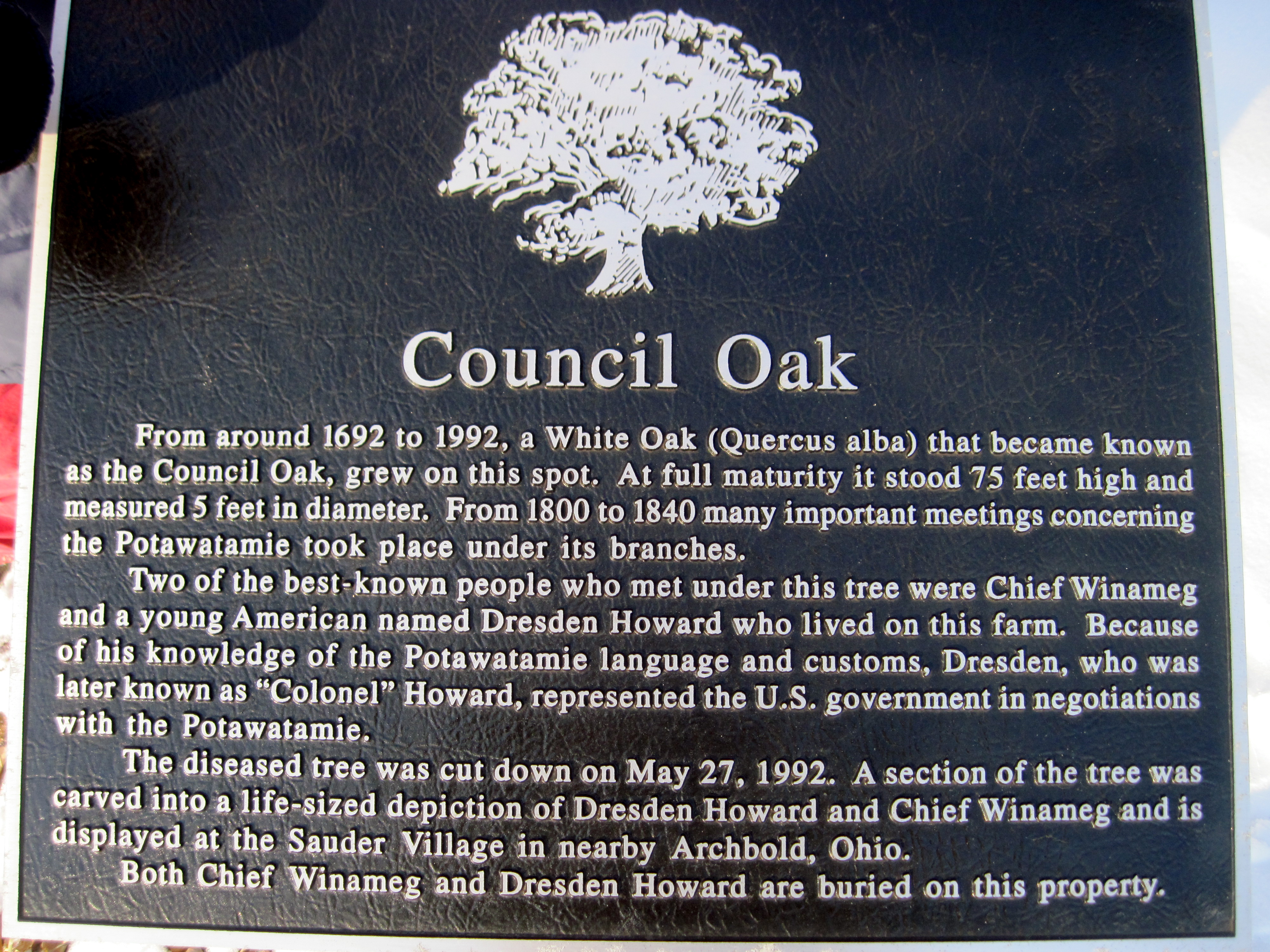
Council Oak historical marker in Winameg, Ohio

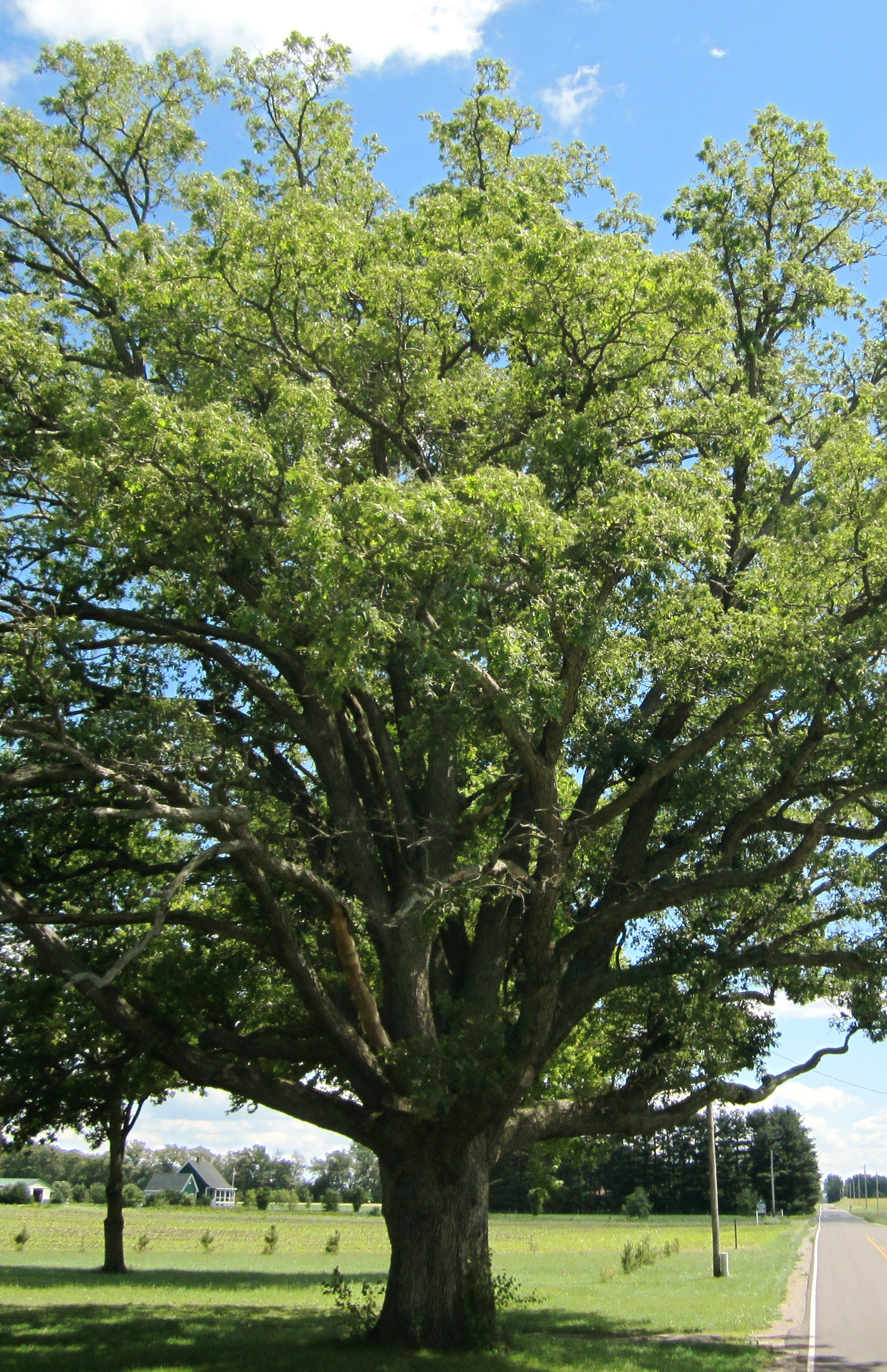
Remnant old-growth oak tree in neighboring Dover Township, reminiscent of Winameg's Council Oak. These trees were once abundant in the Oak Openings Region

Colonel Dresden Winfield Huston (D.W.H.) Howard (1817 – 1897) was an American, Ohio statesman, who lived in Winameg, Fulton County, Ohio.

== Life and work ==
Howard was born 3 November 1817 in Dresden Yates Co., New York. His family moved to Fort Meigs when he was three years old.

He served as a negotiator between the government and the Odawa Native American tribe in northwest Ohio. He was a frequent advocate on behalf of the Odawa. Howard named the first Fulton County seat, Ottokee, Ohio, after a local Odawa chief of the same name. He also served as the first president of the Fulton County Historical Society.

He aided in the Underground Railroad, helping slaves reach freedom in Ohio. He also served as a Senator in Ohio.

== Death ==
He died of cancer on 9 November 1897 in Winnameg. He was laid to rest near his home in Winameg, and near the tomb of the Odawa Chief Winameg. His tomb was of his own making. A historical plaque located in Winameg, memorializing Dresden, reads as follows:

Council Oak

From around 1692 to 1992, a White Oak (Querus alba), that became known as the Council Oak, grew on this spot. At full maturity it stood 75 feet high and measured 5 feet in diameter. From 1800 to 1840 many important meetings concerning the Potawatamie took place under its branches.

Two of the best-known people to meet under this tree were Chief Winameg and a young American named Dresden Howard who lived on this farm. Because of his knowledge of the Potawatamie language and customs, Dresden, who was later known as a "Colonel" Howard, represented the U.S. government in negotiations with the Potawatamie.

The diseased tree was cut down on May 27, 1992. A section of the tree was carved into a life-sized depiction of Dresden Howard and Chief Winameg and is displayed at the Sauder Village in nearby Archbold, Ohio.

Both Chief Winameg and Dresden Howard are buried on this property.

Dresden Howard is remembered in the Fulton County community with life-size depiction of him that is that displayed at Sauder Village in Archbold, Ohio.
