= Ottokee, Ohio =

- Unincorporated community
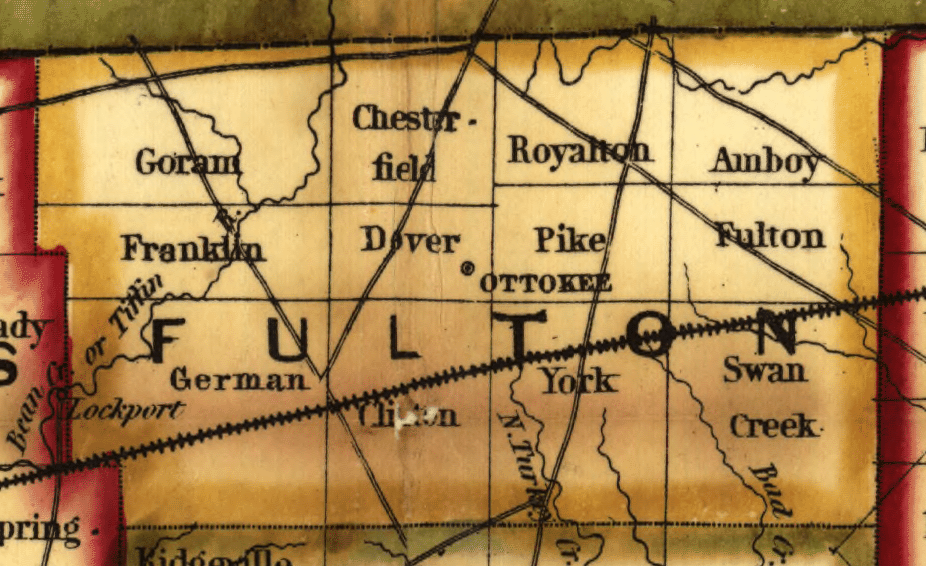
- Ottokee as Fulton County Seat of justice on 1851 railroad map

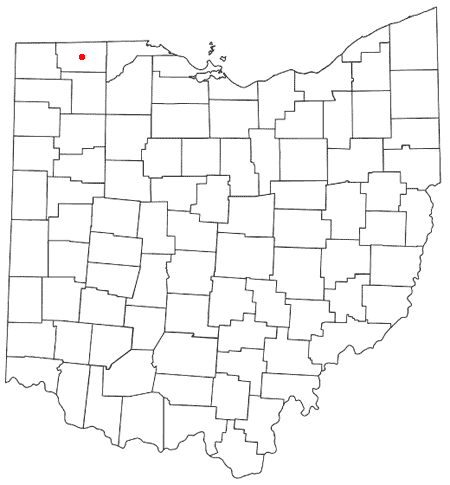
- Location of Ottokee, Ohio
- Coordinates: 41.6022735°N 84.1343917°W
- Country: United States
- State: Ohio
- County: Fulton
- Township: Dover
- Established: Unincorporated

Government
  - Type: Unincorporated
- Elevation: 781 ft (238 m)
- Time zone: UTC-5 (Eastern (EST))
  - Summer (DST): UTC-4 (EDT)
- ZIP codes: 43567
- Area codes: 419 and 567
- GNIS feature ID: 1065222

Ottokee is an unincorporated community in Dover Township, Fulton County, Ohio, United States.

== History ==
=== Chief Ottokee ===
Ottokee was founded in 1850 with the driving of stakes to mark the geographic center of Fulton County, Ohio, and originally given the name "Centre." The village was renamed shortly thereafter at the suggestion of Col. Dresden Howard to honor the Odawa Chief Ot-to-kee. Chief Ot-to-ke (or Ottokee) was the last Native American Chief to plead his peoples' case to remain on their native lands in Fulton County, but to no avail. Ottokee was the half brother of Chief Wauseon, who the city of Wauseon in Fulton County is named after.

=== County Seat ===
Ottokee on the railroad map

In early years consisted of a courthouse, a two-room schoolhouse (pictured), two taverns, a dry goods store, and a grocery store. The village became the first seat of justice for the county. The first courthouse, of wood frame construction, was built in 1851. In 1853, the first jail was built, of wood planks and spikes driven in the planks. Nobody ever escaped on account of the wooden construction. In 1865, a new brick courthouse was built.

However, the first railroads were being built through the county. The first, the Lake Shore and Michigan Southern Railway, laid in 1853, bypassed Ottokee to the south, and anointed Wauseon as a commercial center. By 1869, the county residents had voted to move the county seat to Wauseon, Ohio, and the move was completed in 1872, when the first court session was held in the new Fulton County Courthouse.

A new historical museum/welcome center for the county, one that will replicate the architecture of the first wooden courthouse in Ottokee, is now being built across from the county fairgrounds.

=== Railroad ===
In 1895, the Lima Northern Railway Company was organized in Ohio. The LN built north from Lima through Napoleon and Wauseon, with a stop in Ottokee near the present county fairgrounds, then onto Oak Shade and Adrian, Michigan. In 1897, the railway changed to Detroit and Lima Northern Railway Company (D&LN), which subsequently became the Detroit, Toledo, and Ironton Railroad in 1905. After World War I, Henry Ford bought the DT&I railroad, and in 1925, built a new, faster track east of Ottokee, that passed through Delta, Ohio, relegating the DT&I railway serving Ottokee to a mere spur, which was slowly abandoned in the late 1950s. The old railway right-of-way paralleled Ohio State Route 108, just west of the highway.

=== Fulton County Fair ===
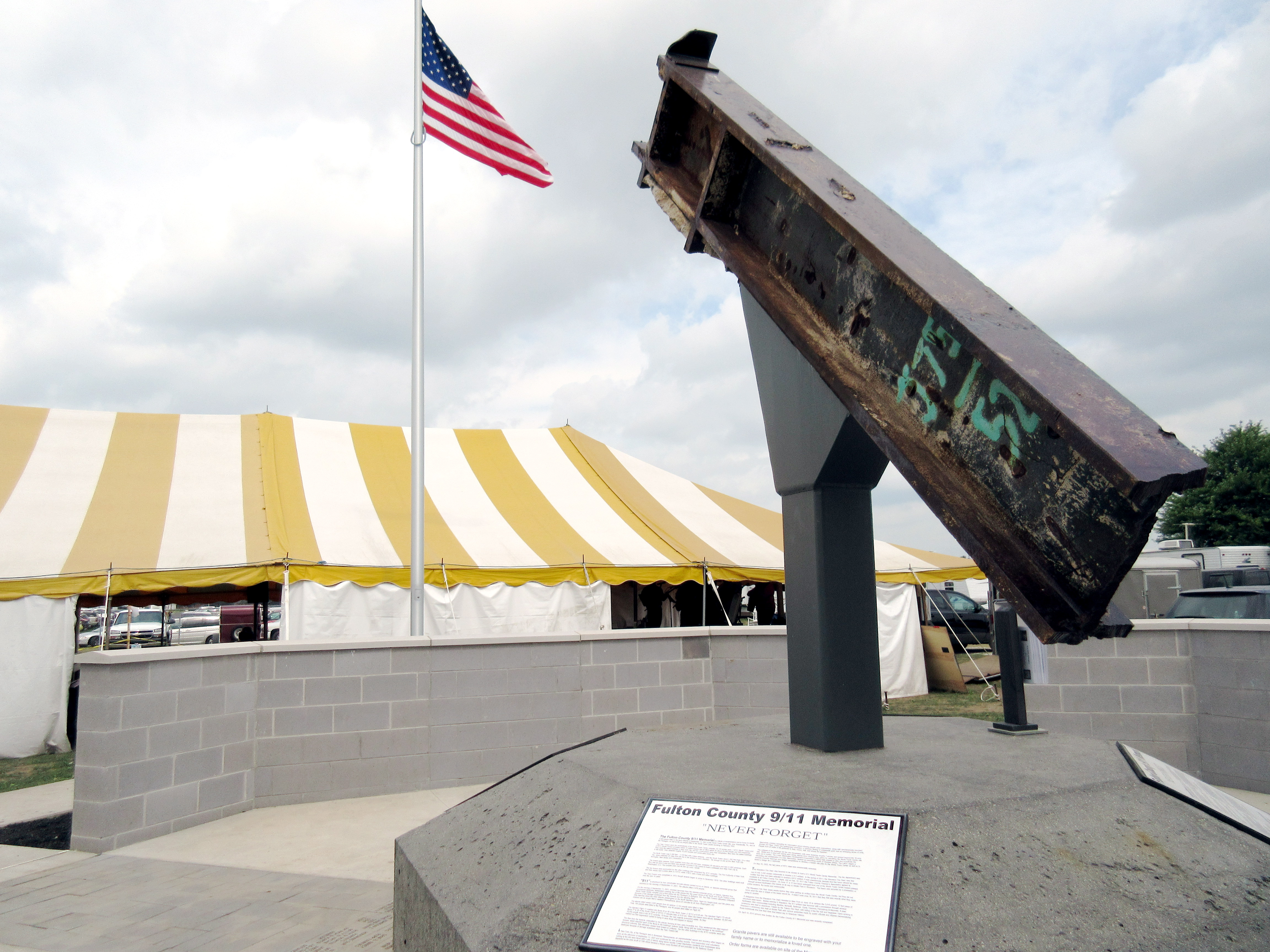
Fulton County 9/11 Memorial

The Fulton County Fair was established in 1858.

Today, it hosts the Fulton County 9/11 Memorial, which was erected in 2013.

=== Grange ===
Ottokee was the site of another agricultural establishment, the National Grange of the Order of Patrons of Husbandry, more commonly known as the Grange. Grange No. 273, was one of several Granges in Fulton County. Ottokee's Grange was started in 1874. It is listed as one of "State and Local Agricultural Associations of the United States" in an 1898 directory published by the United States Interstate Commerce Commission. E. P. Ames of Ottokee and Harmon Gasche of Tedrow were listed in as President and Secretary respectively. In 1928, the US Congress recorded that Ottokee Grange No. 273 had resolved to clean up European corn borer.

=== Fulton County Home ===
Fulton County's first tax supported home for the dependent came in 1874 after the moving of the county seat from Ottokee to Wauseon. In March of that year the government buildings at Ottokee were turned over by the Country Commissioners to three new infirmary directors, who were James Riddle, Robert Lewis, and O.A. Cobb. The work of making necessary changes, specifically the court house, began at once. A contract of 296 acres in the vicinity was purchased, a commodious barn built, and a county farm established. The new infirmary was ready for occupancy on May 1, 1874. It was thought that in time the cultivation of land would make the institution nearly self-sustaining.

Twenty years later the main building of the County Home was erected at a cost of $20,000-$40,000 (the amounts are in dispute). It was a three-story structure with 13 foot high ceilings and broad stairways that was regarded as modern at the time. It was opened for occupancy on New Years Day, 1894. An insane ward was provided for patients considered "harmless and incurable."

An additional building was erected adjacent to and east of the main structure, and served in turn as a jail, a storage building, a residence for farm workers, and a hospital serving residents of the Home. A small cemetery plot lies south east of the home, with unmarked graves for past residents.

Superintendents of the Fulton County Home included O.B. Verity (1874), John Wittaker, S.S. Atkinson, Charles Harmen, H.B. Smith, W.S. Egnew, B.J. Jones, and Harold and Leah Guilford. The last of the superintendents were Mr. and Mrs. Burrell Turpening.

The Fulton County Home served dependents for 101 years, until its residents were moved to Detwiler Manor in nearby Wauseon, Ohio in 1975. The structure was demolished circa 1993.

=== Airport ===
The Fulton County Airport, KUSE was established on the north border of Ottokee in 1967. It is now the site of a cluster of government functions, including the Dog Warden and the Fulton County Highway Department.

== Monument to Women ==
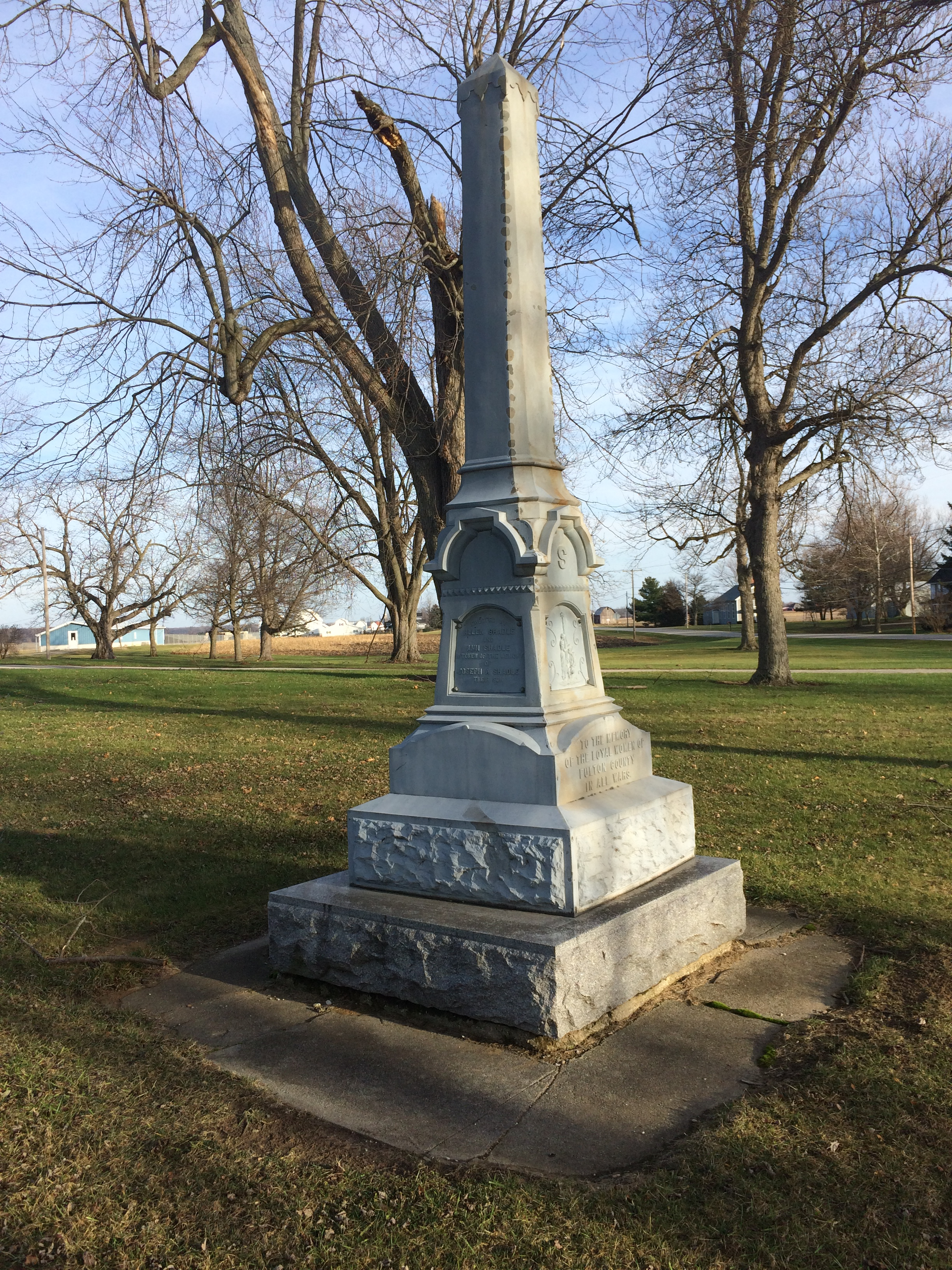
The monument to women in wartime

On the grounds of the Fulton County Home was erected an obelisk as a notable and unusual monument to women in wartime. It is inscribed on three of its four faces, reading in succession

1. To the memory of the loyal women of fulton county in all wars
2. Erected by Allen Shadle and Ann Shadle in token memory of Joseph A. Shadle their son
3. The first four lines of the poem "The Bravest Battle that Ever was Fought" by Joaquin Miller

The date on which the obelisk was put in place is uncertain.

== Government ==
Ottokee is unincorporated and is governed by the trustees of Dover Township
