= Fulton County Airport (Ohio) =

- IATA: none; ICAO: KUSE; FAA LID: USE

Summary
- Airport type: Public
- Owner: Fulton County Commissioners
- Serves: Wauseon, Ohio
- Elevation AMSL: 781 ft (238 m)
- Coordinates: 41°36′36″N 084°07′38″W

Map
- Location of airport in Ohio USE (the United States)

Runways
Direction	Length		Surface
Direction	ft	m	Surface
9/27	3,882	1,183	Asphalt
18/36	2,115	645	Asphalt/Turf

Statistics (2022)
- Aircraft operations (year ending 6/30/2022): 22,510
- Based aircraft: 19
- Source: Federal Aviation Administration

Fulton County Airport (ICAO: KUSE, FAA LID: USE) is a public use airport located four nautical miles (5 mi, 7 km) north of the central business district of Wauseon, a city in Fulton County, Ohio, United States. It is owned by the Fulton County Commissioners. This airport is included in the National Plan of Integrated Airport Systems for 2011–2015, which categorized it as a general aviation facility.

Although most U.S. airports use the same three-letter location identifier for the FAA and IATA, this airport is assigned USE by the FAA, but has no designation from the IATA.

The airport hosts regular events, like an Aviation Day workshop to teach kids about aviation.

== History ==
Ground was broken on the first building in an adjacent industrial park in June 1968. The manager of the 10,000 sq ft (930 m^{2}) Signal-Stat Corporation plant, Vic Travis, had elected to locate it there as he was a pilot and could store his airplane in an adjoining hangar. The airport was dedicated on 5 October 1968. However, the airport had been opened when the first airplane landed there on September 25th. In addition to its 4,000 ft (1,200 m) east-west paved runway, plans to open a 3,500 ft (1,100 m) north-south grass strip were in place by the airport's first anniversary. Construction on eight t-hangars had begun by late July 1970.

Following the establishment of an airport authority and new management of the airport earlier in the year, a series of unpaid bills were discovered in early December 1987. Construction on a twelve unit hangar had begun by late May 1990. In the meantime, a flight school run by Davis College had opened. The airport's fixed-base operator announced in April 1991 it would be leaving and a replacement said the same in July 1993. A master plan completed in 1992 that envisioned extending the paved runway to 4,300 ft (1,300 m) was met with opposition from the community. A fourth operator was hired in October 1998, but quit at the end of August 2005.

== Facilities and aircraft ==
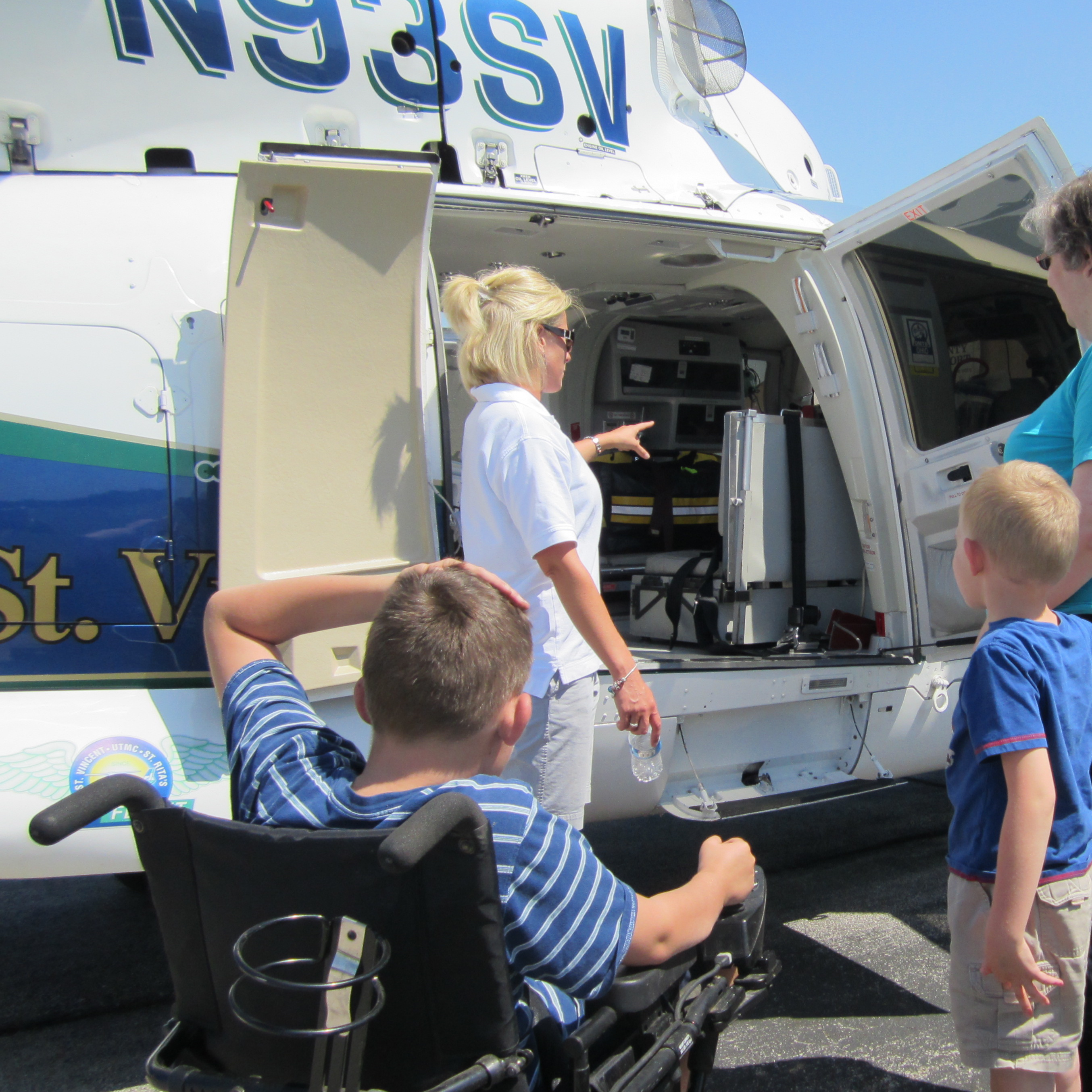
St. Vincent Medical Center's LifeFlight helicopter located at KUSE

Fulton County Airport covers an area of 42 acres (17 ha) at an elevation of 781 feet (238 m) above mean sea level. It has two runways: 9/27 is 3,882 by 75 feet (1,183 x 23 m) with an asphalt surface and 18/36 is 2,115 by 75 feet (645 x 23 m) with an asphalt and turf surface.

The airport has a fixed-base operator that sells fuel. It has services and amenities such as hangars, courtesy cars, internet, conference rooms, a crew lounge, and television.

For the 12-month period ending June 30, 2022, the airport had 22,510 aircraft operations, an average of 62 per day: 97% general aviation, 2% air taxi, and <1% military.

At that time there were 19 aircraft based at this airport: 17 single-engine airplanes, 1 multi-engine, and 1 glider.

St. Vincent Mercy Medical Center's Aérospatiale SA 365 Dauphin LifeFlight helicopter is hangared at the airport for medical evacuations.

== Accidents and incidents ==
- On 3 May 1996, a Bellanca Super Viking crashed while landing at the airport. The pilot and a passenger were rescued from the burning wreckage by the airport manager.
- On 11 May 2003, a Beechcraft Sierra crashed at the airport, killing three occupants.
- On July 5, 2017, a Cessna 177 Cardinal made a hard landing during an attempted emergency approach to the airport. Witnesses reported the airplane's engine lost power while trying to land.

== See also ==
- List of airports in Ohio
