= Jean Paul Slusser =

American painter, art critic, professor, and museum director

Jean Paul Slusser (15 December 1886 – 28 May 1981) was a painter, designer, art critic, professor, and director of the University of Michigan Museum of Art.

== Early life ==
Slusser was born in 1886 in Wauseon, Ohio. He graduated from Lyons Township High School in La Grange, Illinois, and spent one year at Downers Grove High School near Chicago.

== Education ==
Slusser studied at the University of Michigan, receiving a Bachelor of Arts in 1901 and a Master of Arts in 1911. He spent part of 1909 and 1910 studying at the Ludwig-Maximilians-Universität München. He taught rhetoric at the University of Texas from 1910 to 1912. He also attended the School of the Museum of Fine Arts in Boston from 1913 to 1915, and spent the summers of 1914 through 1917 at the Art Students' League in New York City.

== Career ==
=== Teaching ===
In 1921, he came an instructor in drawing and painting at the University of Michigan (UM). He briefly studied at the Hans Hofmann Schule in Munich in 1924 and 1925, then returned to UM, and was promoted to assistant professor in 1927. He became an associate professor in 1935, then a full professor in 1944.

He was one founder of the Ann Arbor Street Art Fair.

He donated his papers to the Bentley Historical Library in 1981.

=== Painting ===
He lived in New York City as a freelance painter from 1919 to 1924.

His paintings are included in the permanent collections of the Detroit Institute of Arts and the Illinois State Museum. He also painted a mural for the post office in Blissfield, Michigan in 1935. He remained an active painter into his nineties.

=== Art criticism ===
Slusser worked as an art critic for the Boston Herald from 1913 to 1915, and the New York Herald from 1921 to 1923.

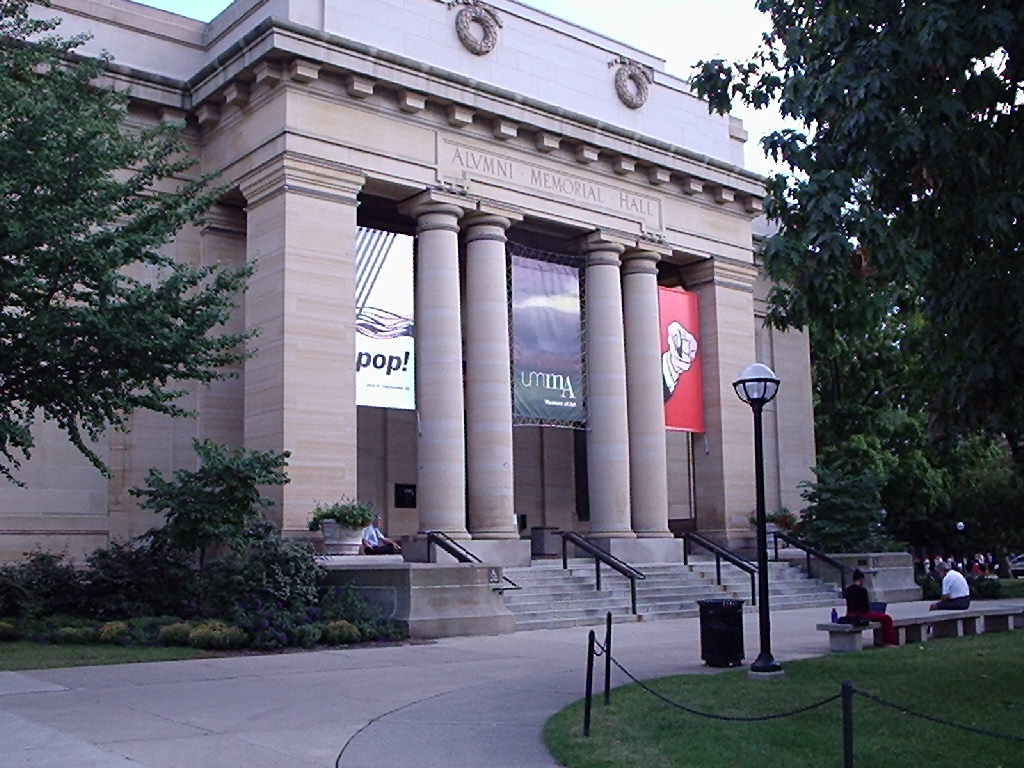
The University of Michigan Museum of Art, where Slusser served as the director from 1946 to 1957.

He was known to write letters back and forth with the artist William H. Littlefield.

He also worked as an art critic for the Ann Arbor News.

=== Museum directorship ===
In 1946, he was named the acting director of the University of Michigan Museum of Art. He was then named director in 1947, and served until his retirement in 1957. When he retired, Charles H. Sawyer took over.

Of his work at UMMA, he said, "A University museum of art, is primarily a device for the furtherance of teaching. Its function is to conserve and display the various art works belonging to the institution, and to supplement them with showings of other material pertinent to the work pursued in the courses dealing with the theory, practice and history of the visual arts."

While director, Slusser used his small annual appropriation for acquisitions to build a collection that included European and American modernist works on paper, Japanese woodblock prints, works from the Parisian belle epoque, and German expressionist works.

Slusser also bequeathed UMMA many pieces from his personal collection, including artwork by Marc Chagall, Alberto Giacometti, William Hogarth, and Paul Cézanne.

== Legacy ==
Slusser died in 1981 at the age of 94. A gallery at the U-M Art and Architecture Gallery was named for him in 1975.
