= National Threshers Association =

US group of steam engine enthusiasts

The National Threshers Association (NTA) is a non-profit group of enthusiasts who are interested in steam-powered traction engines – also known as "steam tractors", "steam traction engines" or simply "steam engines" – as well as related equipment.

The group's premier event is the annual National Threshers Reunion. The Threshers Reunion features live exhibits of antique steam engines and gas-powered machinery from throughout the United States and Canada. Dating back to 1944, the annual show has had a reputation as the oldest event of its type in the United States, and the largest steam event east of the Mississippi River.

== Association background ==
Originally organized in 1944 on a farm in Alvordton, Ohio, in the northwest corner of the state, thresherman Leroy Blaker’s goal was to provide a weekend gathering of fun, food and fellowship with his hardworking neighbors. Today, at the more accommodating Fulton County Fairgrounds in Wauseon, Ohio, that same concept exists to help show others how many of today’s farm tasks were originally handled. The association's current membership is worldwide, and new members are welcomed.

== Annual show's location and dates ==
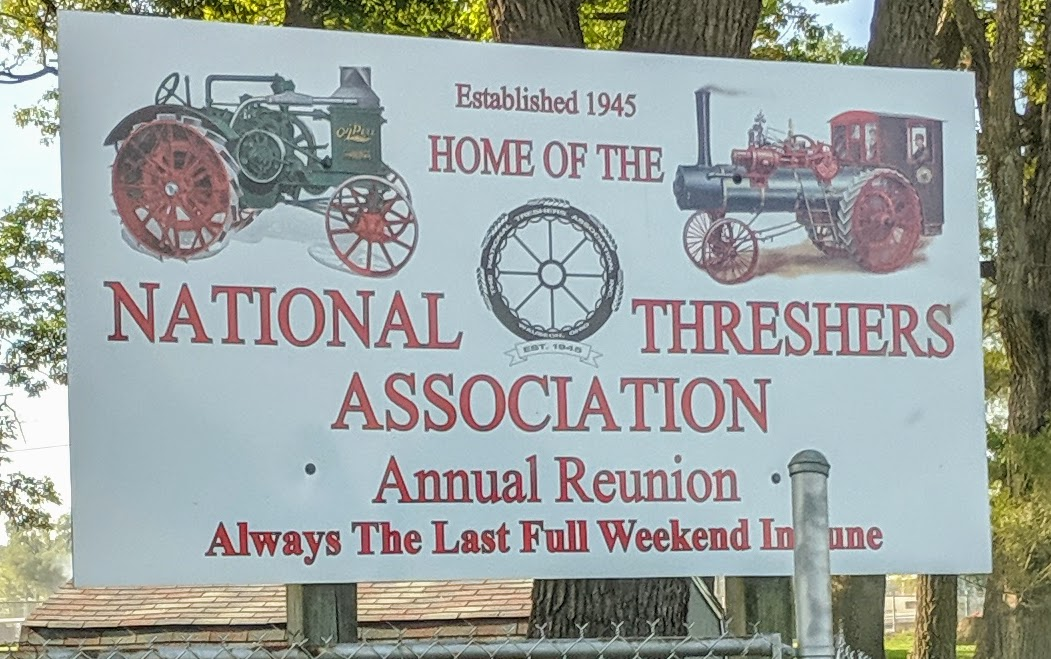
National Threshers Association sign at Fulton County Fairground.

The annual National Threshers Association show is held during the last full four-day weekend (Thursday - Sunday) in June at the Fulton County Fairgrounds near Wauseon, Ohio. The fairgrounds are located on Ohio State Route 108 just north of the Ohio Turnpike exit 34.

== Show events ==
Each year, the National Threshers Association reunion/show features approximately 50 steam engines - all operating - in addition to hundreds of gas tractors and gas engines. Daily demonstrations include wheat threshing, straw baling, sawmill, a shingle mill, farm plowing, and machinery parades with covered grandstand seating for spectators.

Other highlights include antique tractor and steam engine pulling displays, hill climb, engineer skills contests, evening spark shows, pony brake horsepower testing, Baker fans, gas tractor parade into the nearby town of Wauseon, and other displays. Air-powered engines displays are also featured, along with photos and memorabilia displays dating back to the reunion's first show.

The John F. Limmer Best Restored Engine award is awarded each year to the steam engine that has been best restored to its original condition.

== Equipment that is exhibited ==
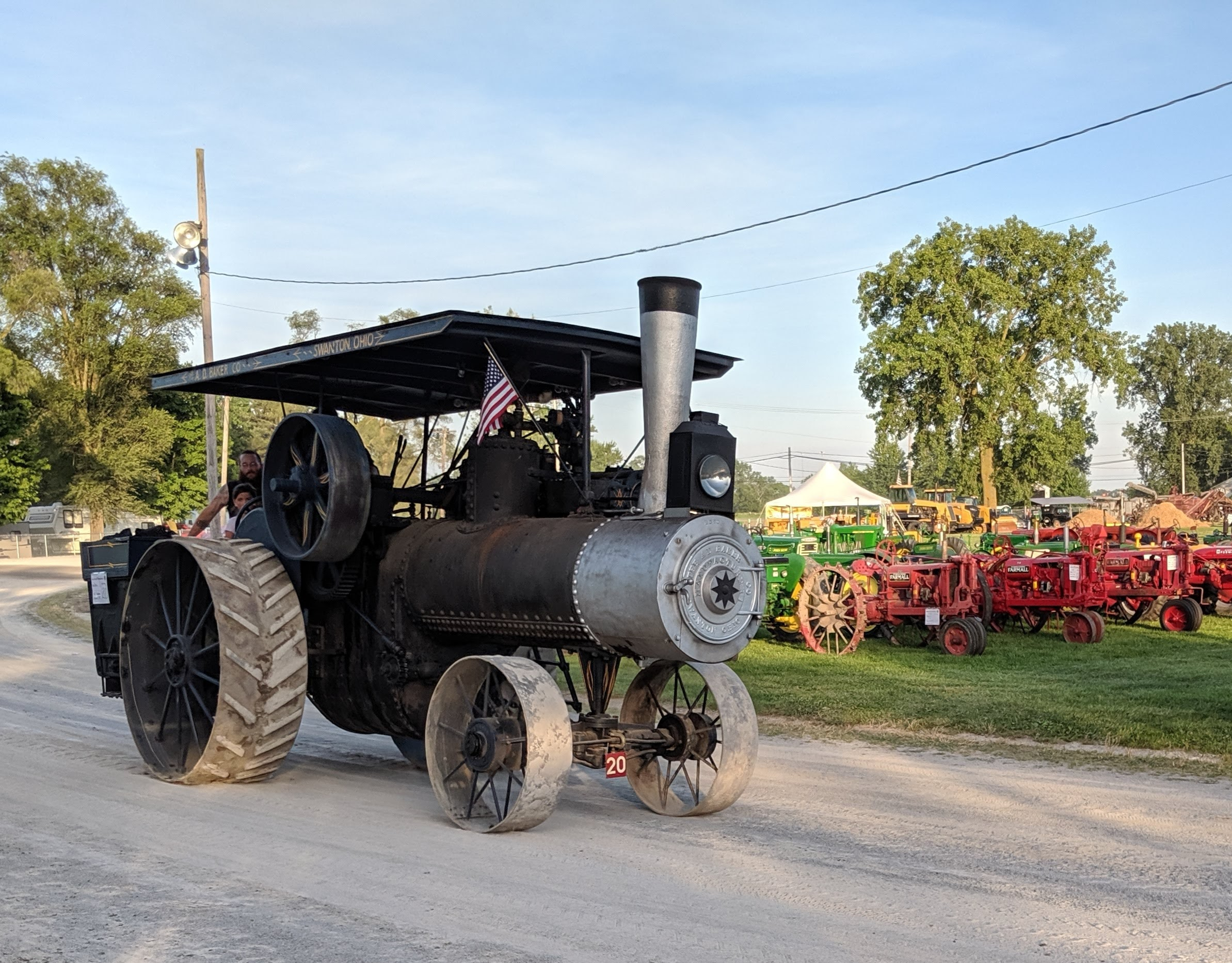
Steam Tractor at National Threshers Association, Fulton County Fairground, OH (2019).

The equipment that is exhibited each year at the annual reunion/show represents a wide range of makes and models of steam engines, gas tractors, stationary gas engines and related equipment.

Steam engine makes include: Advance, Advance-Rumeley, American-Abell, Aultman-Taylor, Avery, A.D. Baker, Buffalo-Pitts, J.I. Case, Colean, Frick, Gaar Scott, George-White, Greyhound Banting, Harrison Jumbo, Huber, Keck-Gonnerman Co., Kitten, Leader, Minneapolis, Nichols & Shephard, Peerless Geiser, Port Huron, Reeves, Robert-Bell, M. Rumeley, Russell, Sawyer-Massey, Upton, Wood and others. Boilers for all steam engines must pass certification requirements for operation, as set forth by the State of Ohio.

Gas tractor makes include: Advance-Rumely, Allis-Chalmers, Aultman-Taylor, Avery, J.I. Case, Caterpillar, Cockshutt, Co-operative Mfg., John Deere, Empire, Ferguson, Ford, Greyhound, Hart-Parr, Huber, International Harvester, Massey Ferguson, Massey-Harris, Minneapolis-Moline, Oliver, Rock Island, Plymouth & Silver King, and others.
