= Dover Township, Ohio =

Dover Township may be any of these places in the U.S. state of Ohio:

- Dover Township, Athens County, Ohio
- Dover Township, Cuyahoga County, Ohio, a defunct township
- Dover Township, Fulton County, Ohio
- Dover Township, Tuscarawas County, Ohio
- Dover Township, Union County, Ohio

== See also ==
- Dover Township (disambiguation)
