= Tedrow, Ohio =

- Census-designated place
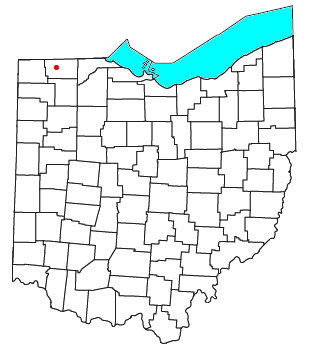
- Location of Tedrow, Ohio
- Coordinates: 41°36′10″N 84°12′15″W
- Country: United States
- State: Ohio
- County: Fulton
- Township: Dover

Government
  - Type: Unincorporated

Area
  - Total: 0.32 sq mi (0.83 km^{2})
  - Land: 0.32 sq mi (0.83 km^{2})
  - Water: 0 sq mi (0.00 km^{2})
- Elevation: 771 ft (235 m)

Population (2020)
  - Total: 168
  - Density: 524/sq mi (202.3/km^{2})
- Time zone: UTC-5 (Eastern (EST))
  - Summer (DST): UTC-4 (EDT)
- ZIP codes: 43567
- Area codes: 419 and 567
- FIPS code: 39-76358
- GNIS feature ID: 2628976

Tedrow is an unincorporated community and census-designated place (CDP) in Dover Township, Fulton County, Ohio, United States. The population was 168 at the 2020 census. It lies at the intersection of the east-west County Road J with the north-south County Roads 17-2 and 17-3, 3 miles (5 km) north and 3.5 miles (5.6 km) west of the northern edge of the city of Wauseon, the county seat of Fulton County. The community lies less than one mile (about 1 km) north of the Ohio Turnpike, although the nearest exit is several miles away.

== History ==
=== Post Office ===
A post office was established in 1839, and remained in operation until 1917. The community was named for the local Tedrow family.

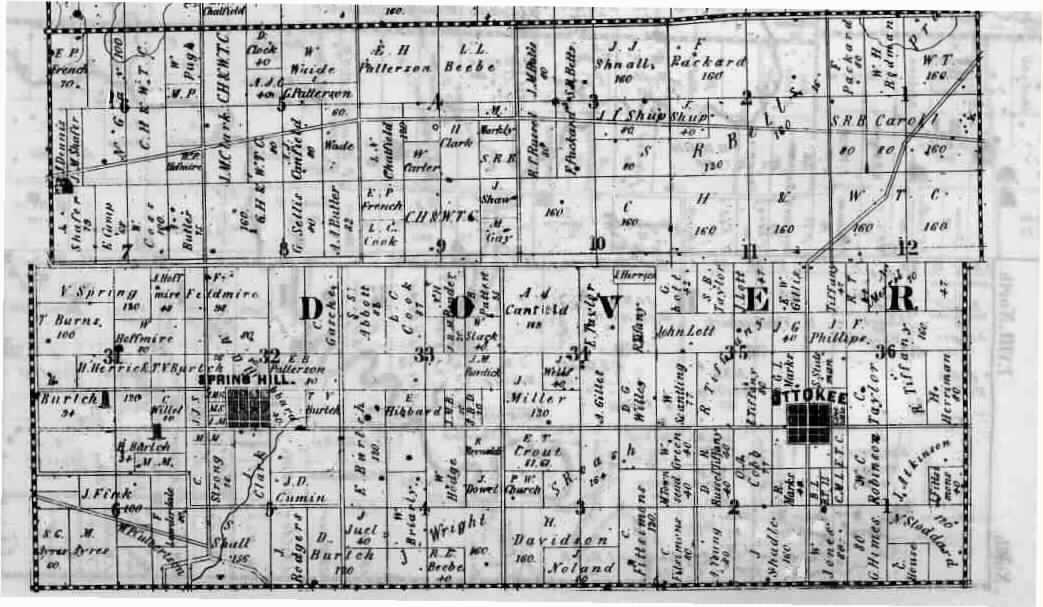
1858 platt map showing Spring Hill, now known as Tedrow

=== Spring Hill ===
Brush Creek, a tributary of the Tiffin River, rises near Tedrow. The creek is fed by a spring. The spring's clean water made the spot a favorite Indian campground and resting place in their migratory hunting excursions. Thus, Tedrow was first known as "Spring Hill", as shown on an 1858 plat map.
