= Winameg, Ohio =

- Unincorporated community
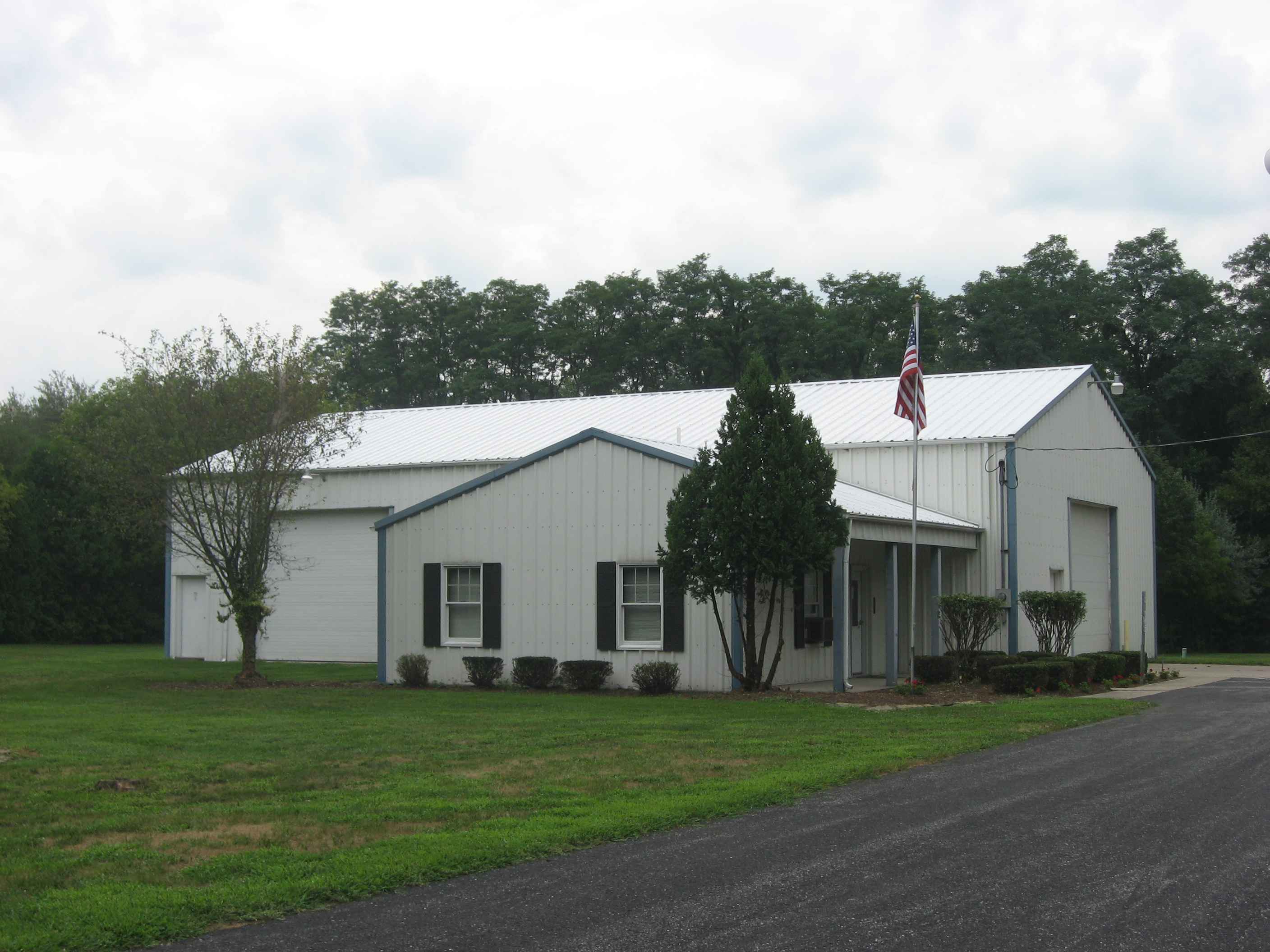
- Pike Township hall in Winameg
- Interactive map of Winameg, Ohio
- Coordinates: 41°37′25″N 84°3′56″W
- Country: United States
- State: Ohio
- County: Fulton
- Township: Pike
- Established: Unincorporated

Government
  - Type: Unincorporated
- Time zone: UTC-5 (Eastern (EST))
  - Summer (DST): UTC-4 (EDT)
- Area codes: 419 and 567

Winameg is an unincorporated community in Fulton County, in the U.S. state of Ohio. Pike Township maintains its government and maintenance facilities in Winameg.

== History ==
The community is named after a Potawatomi Indian chief named Winameg. The chief became friends with a white pioneer. They first met under a large white oak tree that stood until 1992 in Winameg. The tree is referred to as the Council Oak. A historical plaque marks where it once stood. Chief Winameg is buried in Winameg, alongside his friend Dresden Howard. Chief Winameg and Howard are remembered in Fulton County with life-size depiction of both figures, carved from the wood of a historical tree in Winameg under which the two first met, and displayed at Sauder Village in Archbold, Ohio.

A post office called Winameg was established in 1856, and remained in operation until 1902.

== Gallery ==
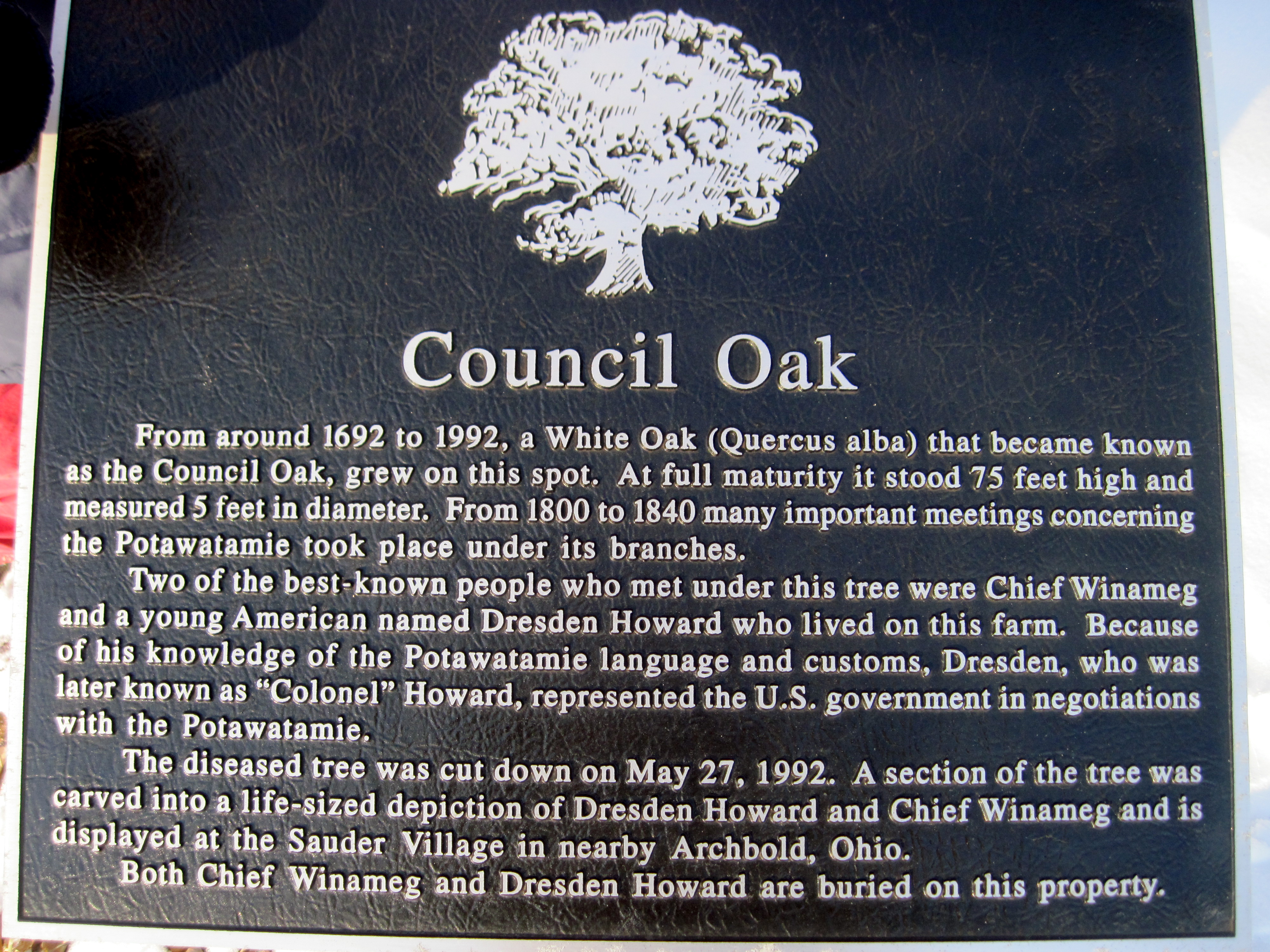
Council Oak historical marker in Winameg, Ohio

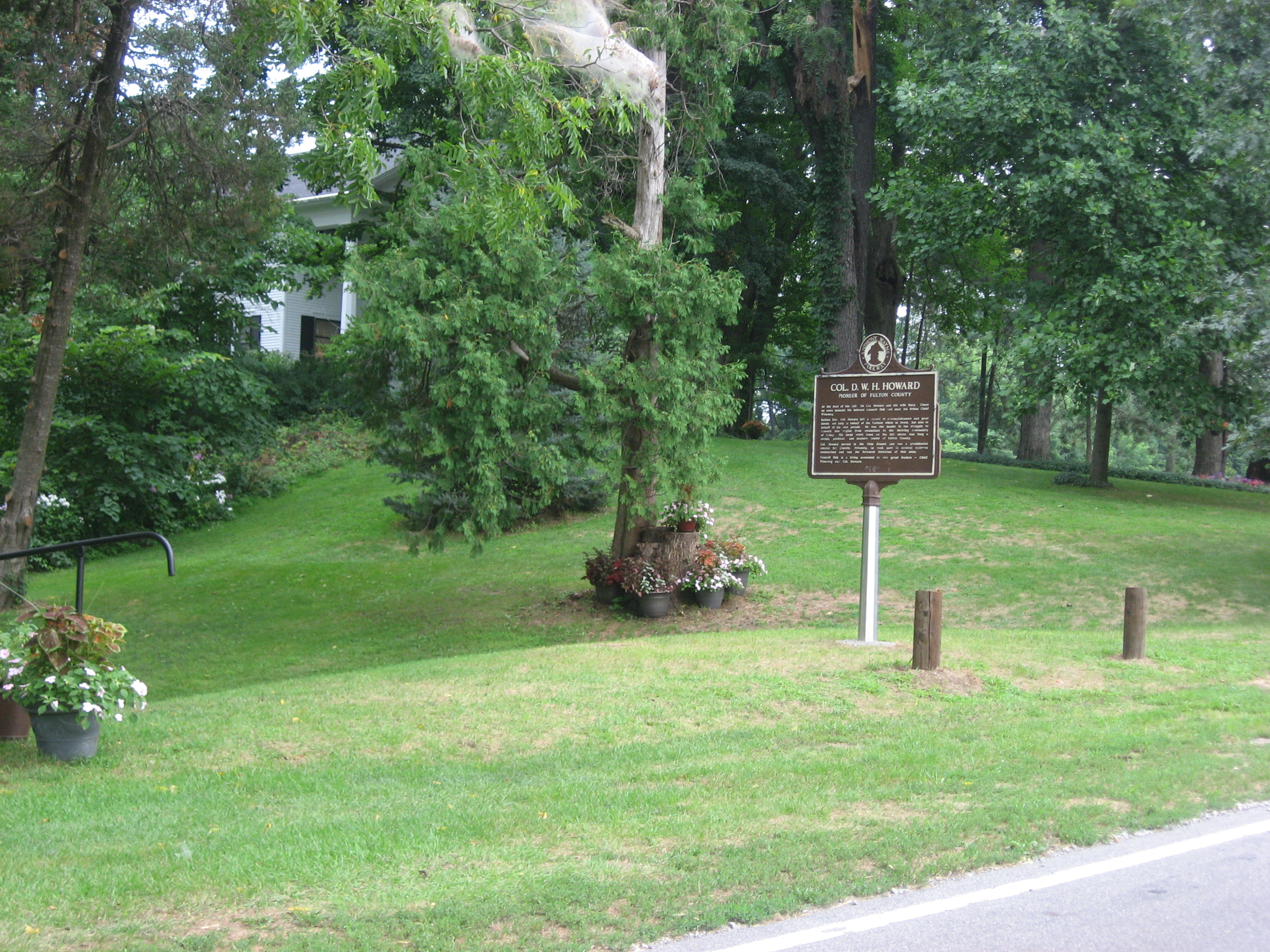
Historical marker for Winameg Mounds
