= Davis University =

Private for-profit college in Toledo, Ohio, United States

- Type: Private for-profit college
- Established: 1858
- President: Diane Brunner
- Undergraduates: 434
- Location: Toledo, Ohio, United States; 41°41′32″N 83°37′47″W
- Website: davisuniversity.edu

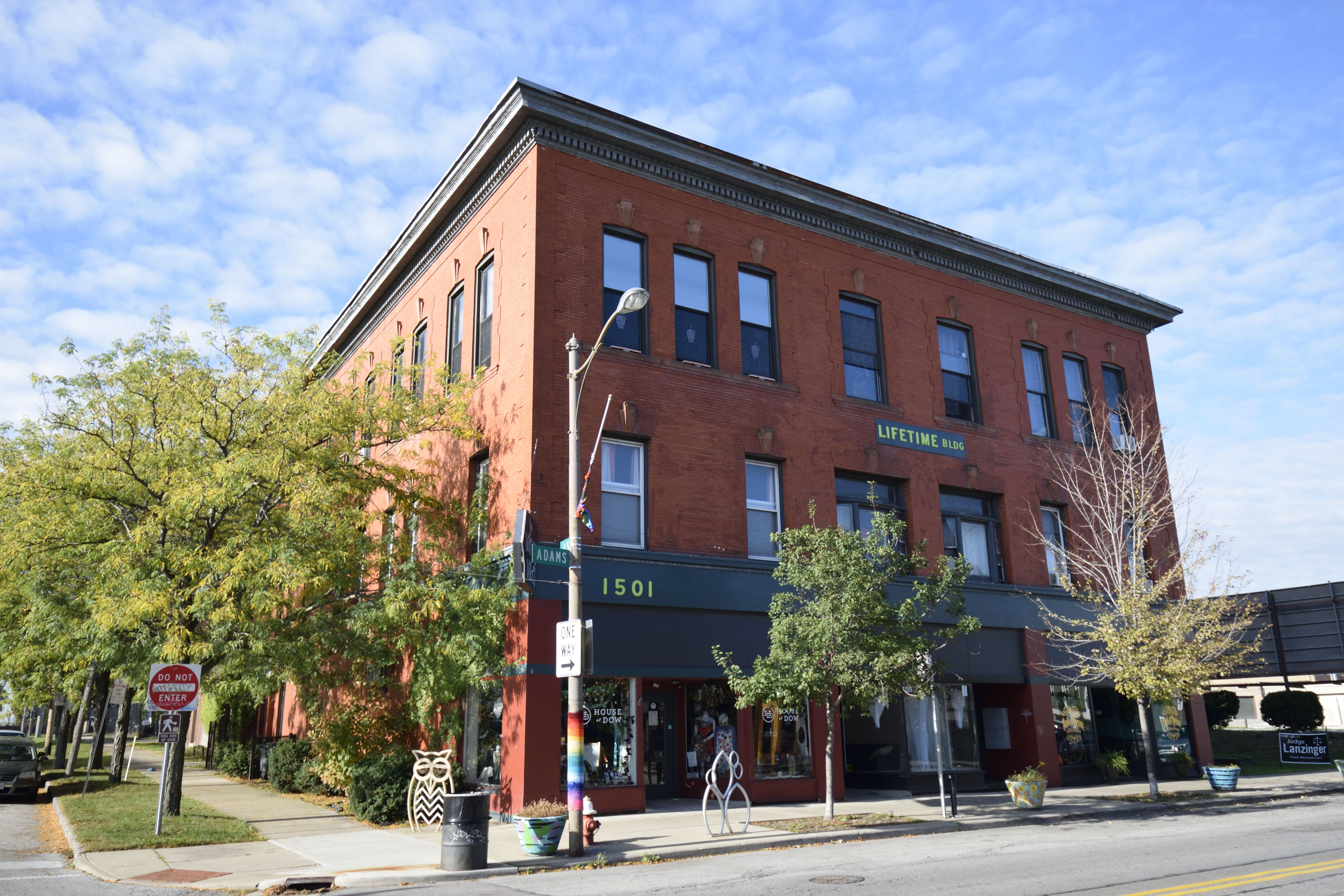
The Lifetime Building at 1501 - 1505 Adams Street in Toledo, Ohio in 2019, previously home to an earlier incarnation of the Davis University as Davis Business College

Davis University is a private for-profit college in Toledo, Ohio. It was formerly known as Davis College, Davis Business College, and Toledo Business College.

In July 2019, the college announced it would be moving its campus to downtown Toledo, Ohio.
