= Wauseon, Ohio =

- City
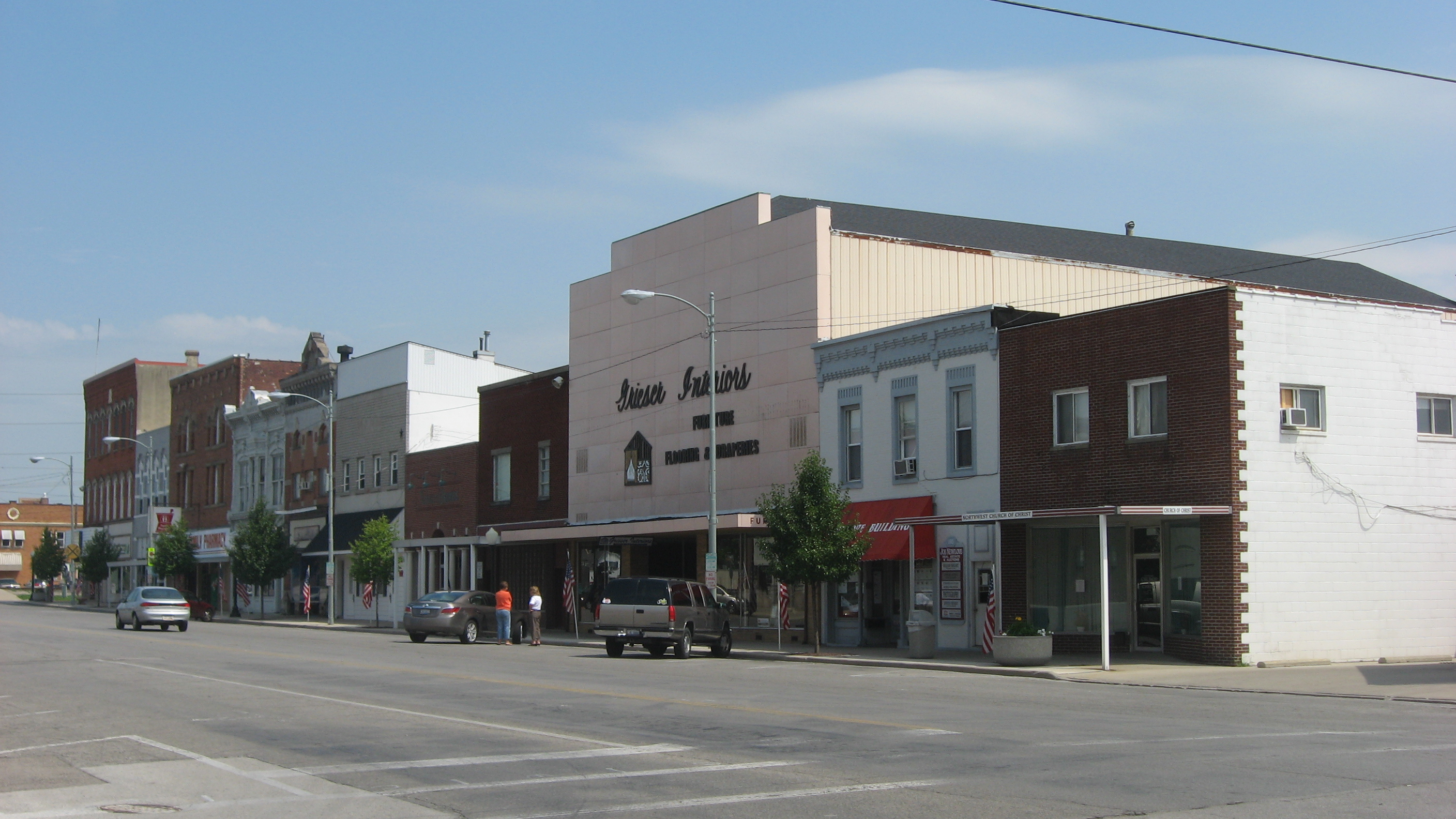
- Buildings in downtown Wauseon
- Motto: A City You'll Take To Heart
- Interactive map of Wauseon, Ohio
- Location within Ohio Location within the United States
- Coordinates: 41°33′20″N 84°07′51″W
- Country: USA
- State: Ohio
- County: Fulton
- Township: Clinton

Government
  - Mayor: Kathy Huner

Area
  - Total: 5.35 sq mi (13.85 km^{2})
  - Land: 5.32 sq mi (13.78 km^{2})
  - Water: 0.027 sq mi (0.07 km^{2})
- Elevation: 755 ft (230 m)

Population (2020)
  - Total: 7,568
  - Density: 1,422.6/sq mi (549.28/km^{2})
- Time zone: UTC-5 (Eastern (EST))
  - Summer (DST): UTC-4 (EDT)
- ZIP code: 43567
- Area codes: 419 and 567
- FIPS code: 39-81928
- GNIS feature ID: 2397224
- Website: www.cityofwauseon.com

Wauseon (/ˈwɔːsiɒn/ WAW-see-on) is a city in and the county seat of Fulton County, Ohio, about 31 mi (51 km) west of Toledo. The population was 7,568 at the time of the 2020 census.

== History ==
Wauseon was platted in 1853 when the Michigan Southern Air Railway was extended to that point. Land speculators bought 160 acres of land that would become the city of Wauseon. The original name for the city was "Litchfield" after Litchfield, New York, birthplace of many of the city's settlers. Hortensia Hayes, the daughter of an early settler, suggested that the new village be named after an Ottawa tribe chief named Wauseon, who had been forced in 1839 by the federal government to forfeit the tribe's land and move to Oklahoma. The village was incorporated in 1859. With the commercial success that the railroad brought, Wauseon grew larger than Fulton County's original seat of Ottokee, and in 1869, Wauseon was named the county seat. The Fulton County Courthouse was built in 1871.

Between 1901 and 1939, the community was served by the Toledo and Indiana Railway, an interurban railway between Toledo and Bryan, Ohio. The construction of the Ohio Turnpike in the mid-20th century also helped the commercial growth of Wauseon.

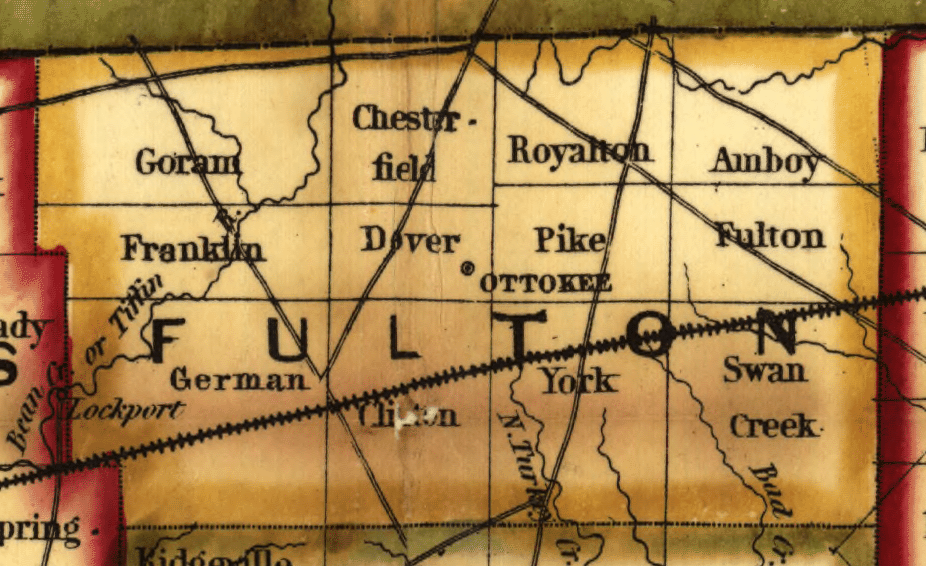
1851 Railroad map: Ottokee is the county seat of justice.

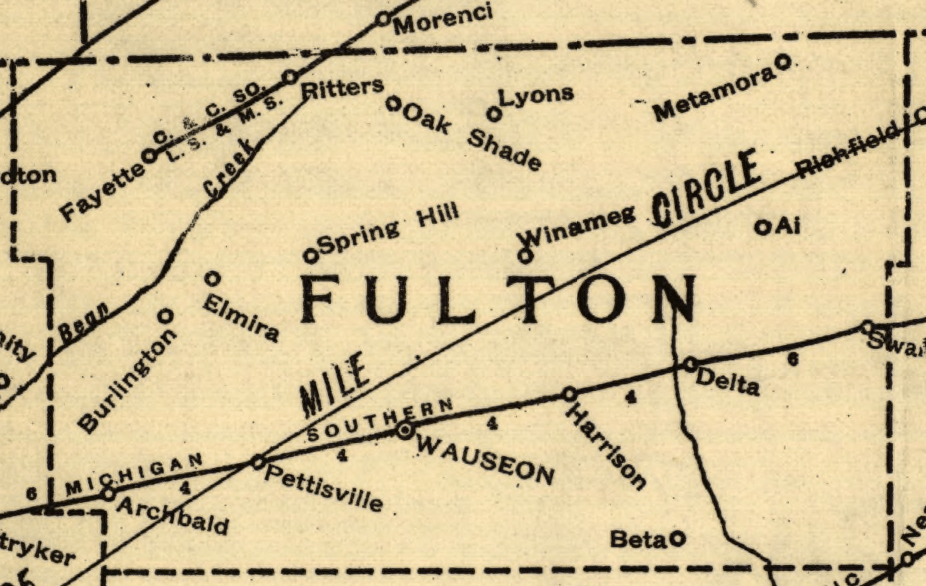
1890 Railroad map: Wauseon is now the county seat.

== Geography ==
According to the United States Census Bureau, the city has a total area of 5.19 square miles (13.44 km^{2}), of which 5.17 square miles (13.39 km^{2}) is land and 0.02 square miles (0.05 km^{2}) is water.

=== Climate ===
Climate data for Wauseon, Ohio (1991–2020 normals, extremes 1893–present)
Month	Jan	Feb	Mar	Apr	May	Jun	Jul	Aug	Sep	Oct	Nov	Dec	Year
Record high °F (°C)	70 (21)	71 (22)	85 (29)	91 (33)	97 (36)	104 (40)	109 (43)	109 (43)	100 (38)	94 (34)	79 (26)	68 (20)	109 (43)
Mean maximum °F (°C)	52.6 (11.4)	55.1 (12.8)	67.3 (19.6)	77.9 (25.5)	86.3 (30.2)	92.7 (33.7)	92.6 (33.7)	90.8 (32.7)	89.6 (32.0)	80.7 (27.1)	66.4 (19.1)	55.9 (13.3)	94.9 (34.9)
Mean daily maximum °F (°C)	31.8 (−0.1)	35.0 (1.7)	45.6 (7.6)	59.2 (15.1)	70.7 (21.5)	80.0 (26.7)	83.6 (28.7)	81.4 (27.4)	76.1 (24.5)	62.9 (17.2)	48.4 (9.1)	36.8 (2.7)	59.3 (15.2)
Daily mean °F (°C)	24.3 (−4.3)	26.6 (−3.0)	35.9 (2.2)	47.8 (8.8)	59.2 (15.1)	68.8 (20.4)	72.3 (22.4)	70.1 (21.2)	63.8 (17.7)	51.9 (11.1)	39.8 (4.3)	29.8 (−1.2)	49.2 (9.6)
Mean daily minimum °F (°C)	16.8 (−8.4)	18.2 (−7.7)	26.3 (−3.2)	36.4 (2.4)	47.8 (8.8)	57.6 (14.2)	60.9 (16.1)	58.8 (14.9)	51.5 (10.8)	40.8 (4.9)	31.1 (−0.5)	22.8 (−5.1)	39.1 (3.9)
Mean minimum °F (°C)	−3.4 (−19.7)	0.2 (−17.7)	9.8 (−12.3)	22.6 (−5.2)	33.6 (0.9)	45.0 (7.2)	50.8 (10.4)	48.4 (9.1)	38.8 (3.8)	28.1 (−2.2)	17.4 (−8.1)	5.3 (−14.8)	−7.2 (−21.8)
Record low °F (°C)	−24 (−31)	−23 (−31)	−11 (−24)	2 (−17)	25 (−4)	30 (−1)	40 (4)	36 (2)	26 (−3)	13 (−11)	−2 (−19)	−21 (−29)	−24 (−31)
Average precipitation inches (mm)	2.16 (55)	1.93 (49)	2.35 (60)	3.18 (81)	3.86 (98)	3.67 (93)	3.75 (95)	3.52 (89)	3.03 (77)	2.65 (67)	2.67 (68)	2.27 (58)	35.04 (890)
Average snowfall inches (cm)	9.2 (23)	7.0 (18)	4.0 (10)	0.4 (1.0)	0.0 (0.0)	0.0 (0.0)	0.0 (0.0)	0.0 (0.0)	0.0 (0.0)	0.0 (0.0)	0.9 (2.3)	5.3 (13)	26.8 (68)
Average precipitation days (≥ 0.01 in)	10.9	8.8	9.3	11.1	11.7	9.8	8.3	8.5	8.2	9.2	9.5	9.8	115.1
Average snowy days (≥ 0.1 in)	6.0	5.6	2.6	0.6	0.0	0.0	0.0	0.0	0.0	0.0	1.1	3.7	19.6
Source: NOAA

== Demographics ==
Historical population
Census	Pop.	Note	%±
1860	378		—
1870	1,474		289.9%
1880	1,905		29.2%
1890	2,060		8.1%
1900	2,148		4.3%
1910	2,650		23.4%
1920	3,035		14.5%
1930	2,889		−4.8%
1940	3,016		4.4%
1950	3,494		15.8%
1960	4,311		23.4%
1970	4,932		14.4%
1980	6,170		25.1%
1990	6,322		2.5%
2000	7,091		12.2%
2010	7,332		3.4%
2020	7,568		3.2%
2025 (est.)	7,430		−1.8%

=== 2020 census ===
As of the 2020 census, Wauseon had a population of 7,568. The median age was 37.5 years. 25.8% of residents were under the age of 18 and 17.6% of residents were 65 years of age or older. For every 100 females there were 95.3 males, and for every 100 females age 18 and over there were 89.6 males age 18 and over.

99.8% of residents lived in urban areas, while 0.2% lived in rural areas.

There were 3,057 households in Wauseon, of which 32.0% had children under the age of 18 living in them. Of all households, 43.8% were married-couple households, 18.6% were households with a male householder and no spouse or partner present, and 30.0% were households with a female householder and no spouse or partner present. About 31.2% of all households were made up of individuals and 14.2% had someone living alone who was 65 years of age or older.

There were 3,184 housing units, of which 4.0% were vacant. The homeowner vacancy rate was 0.9% and the rental vacancy rate was 3.4%.

Racial composition as of the 2020 census
Race	Number	Percent
White	6,220	82.2%
Black or African American	76	1.0%
American Indian and Alaska Native	55	0.7%
Asian	51	0.7%
Native Hawaiian and Other Pacific Islander	5	0.1%
Some other race	478	6.3%
Two or more races	683	9.0%
Hispanic or Latino (of any race)	1,275	16.8%

=== 2010 census ===
As of the census of 2010, there were 7,332 people, 2,798 households, and 1,939 families residing in the city. The population density was 1,418.2 inhabitants per square mile (547.6/km^{2}). There were 3,061 housing units at an average density of 592.1 per square mile (228.6/km^{2}). The racial makeup of the city was 90.3% White, 0.9% African American, 0.3% Native American, 1.0% Asian, 5.2% from other races, and 2.3% from two or more races. Hispanic or Latino of any race were 14.2% of the population.

There were 2,798 households, of which 38.0% had children under the age of 18 living with them, 51.4% were married couples living together, 13.1% had a female householder with no husband present, 4.8% had a male householder with no wife present, and 30.7% were non-families. 26.6% of all households were made up of individuals, and 10.7% had someone living alone who was 65 years of age or older. The average household size was 2.58 and the average family size was 3.10.

The median age in the city was 35.4 years. 28.6% of residents were under the age of 18; 8.2% were between the ages of 18 and 24; 25.6% were from 25 to 44; 24.5% were from 45 to 64; and 13.1% were 65 years of age or older. The gender makeup of the city was 47.9% male and 52.1% female.

=== 2000 census ===
As of the census of 2000, there were 7,091 people, 2,706 households, and 1,875 families residing in the city. The population density was 1,437.6 inhabitants per square mile (555.1/km^{2}). There were 2,851 housing units at an average density of 578.0 per square mile (223.2/km^{2}). The racial makeup of the city was 92.77% White, 0.55% African American, 0.37% Native American, 0.82% Asian, 0.01% Pacific Islander, 4.02% from other races, and 1.47% from two or more races. Hispanic or Latino of any race were 9.79% of the population.

There were 2,706 households, out of which 37.9% had children under the age of 18 living with them, 63.0% were married couples living together, 12.2% had a female householder with no husband present, and 30.7% were non-families. 26.0% of all households were made up of individuals, and 10.6% had someone living alone who was 65 years of age or older. The average household size was 2.58 and the average family size was 3.13.

In the city the population was spread out, with 29.1% under the age of 18, 9.1% from 18 to 24, 28.8% from 25 to 44, 20.5% from 45 to 64, and 12.5% who were 65 years of age or older. The median age was 34 years. For every 100 females, there were 88.7 males. For every 100 females age 18 and over, there were 85.1 males.

The median income for a household in the city was $39,591, and the median income for a family was $48,981. Males had a median income of $32,645 versus $24,042 for females. The per capita income for the city was $17,491. About 3.9% of families and 5.2% of the population were below the poverty line, including 6.5% of those under age 18 and 1.7% of those age 65 or over.

== Parks and attractions ==
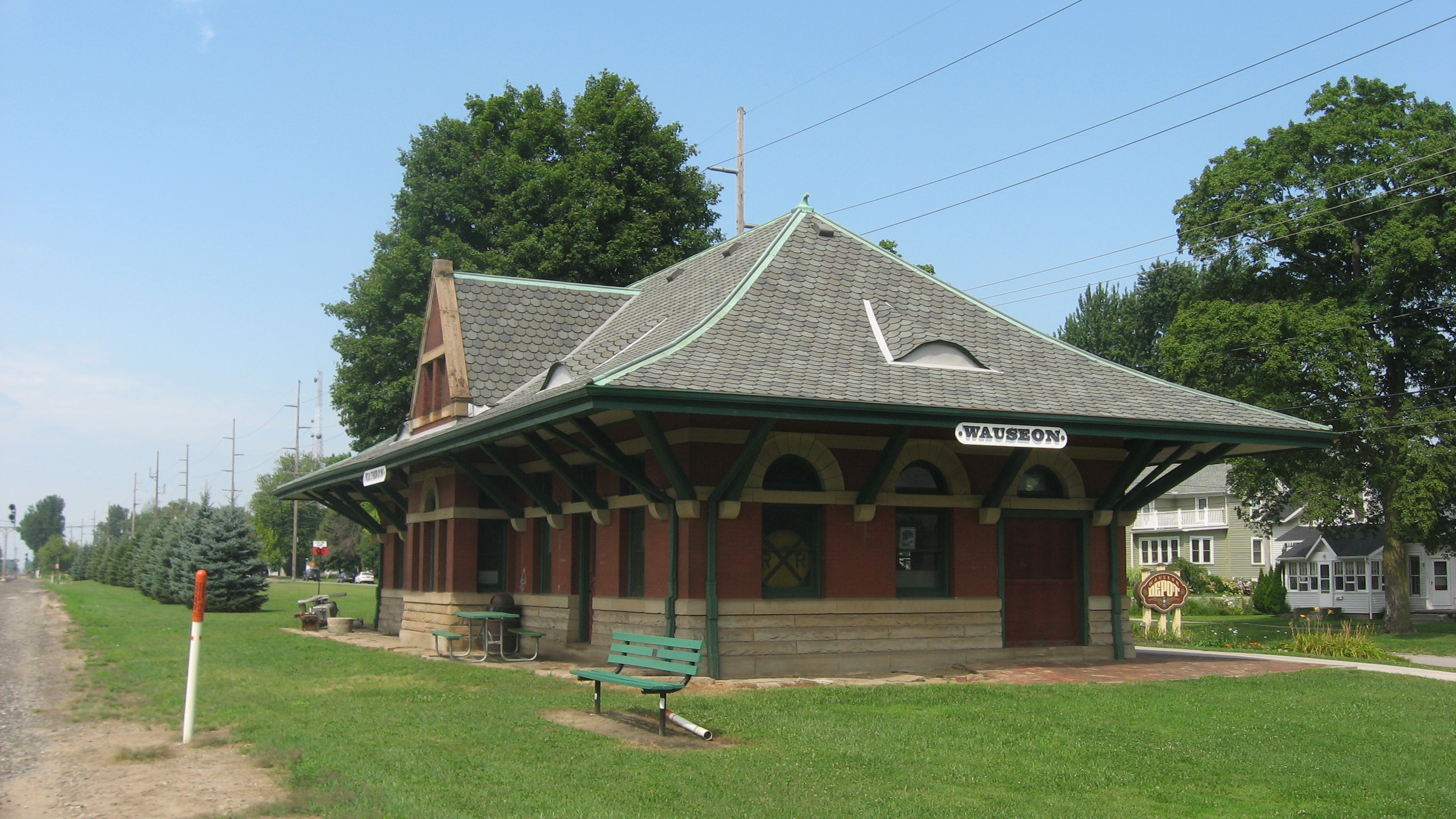
Wauseon Lake Shore and Michigan Southern Railway Depot

- Biddle Park, opened in 2009, is a 52-acre sports complex and park that consists of 8 baseball/softball fields, 3 T-ball fields, batting cages, 3 basketball courts, 3 sand volleyball courts, a football field, and 9 soccer pitches. The park will add 4 more baseball/softball fields before being completed. Biddle Park hosts many events each summer, city league youth sports, multi state baseball and softball tournaments, NWOAL league tournaments, and the city's Fourth of July Fireworks display. The park is named after Dorothy Biddle, who donated 1.7 million dollars to the building of the park in 2003.
- City of Wauseon Pool, opened in 2018, consists of two diving boards, two large slides, along with a zero depth entry which include tumble buckets and a few drop for the littles.
- Fulton County Fair, including the Fulton County 9/11 Memorial
- Midwest Geobash, annual geocaching event is held in July at the Fulton County Fairgrounds.
- Wabash Cannonball Trail, features 4 miles of paved trail in the city of Wauseon
- AMCA National Motorcycle Meet, one of the largest antique motorcycle swap meets and judging events in the United States.
- Sterlena the Cow, a 14 foot tall fiberglass cow that once served as the mascot for Sterling's Dairy before the company went out of business. Sterlena now resides at the Fulton County Fairgrounds.

== Education ==
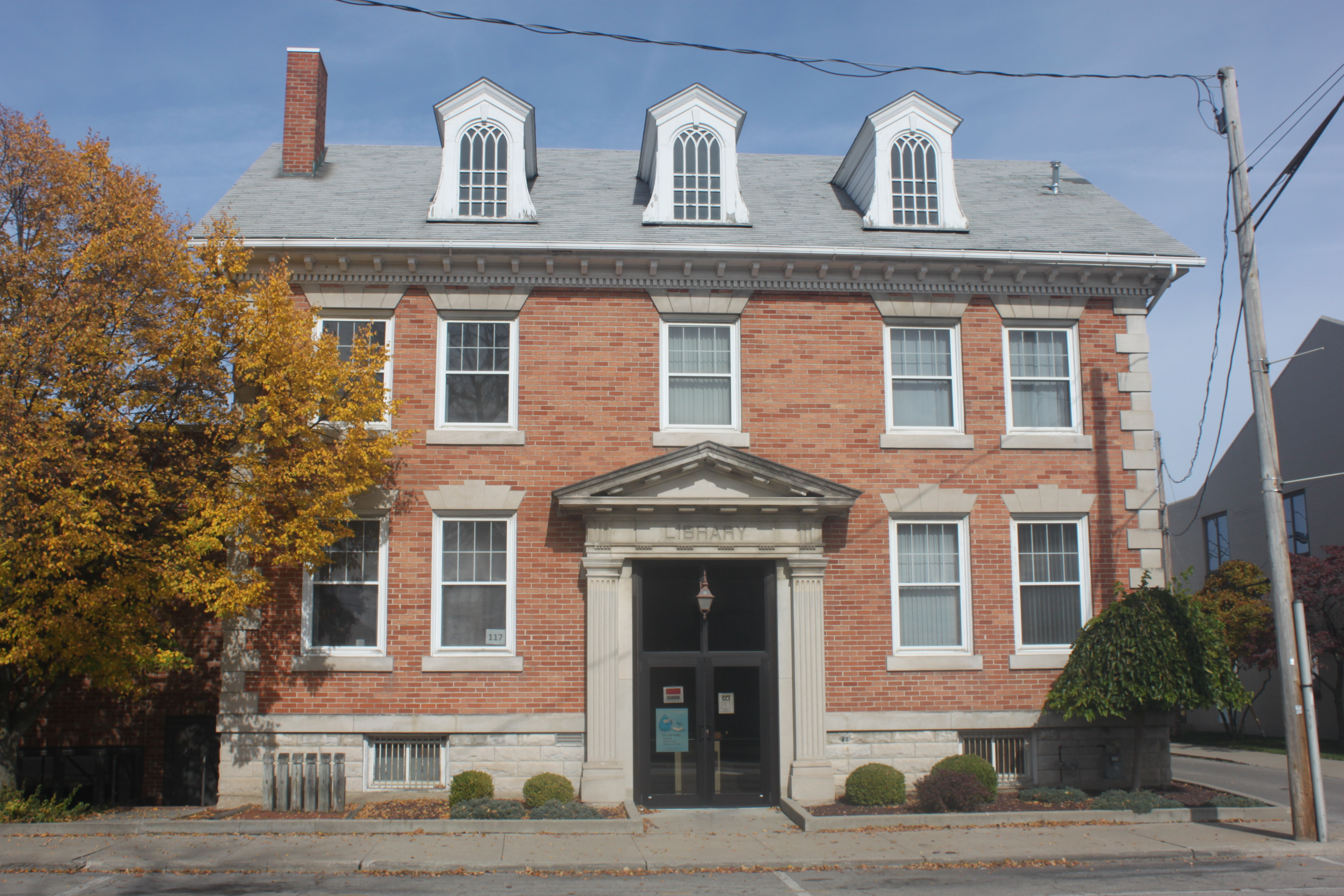
Wauseon Public Library

Wauseon Exempted Village School District operates four schools within the city: a primary school, elementary school, middle school, and Wauseon High School.

Wauseon Public Library was originally funded by tycoon and entrepreneur Andrew Carnegie in 1906. In 2005, the library loaned more than 238,000 items to its 20,000 cardholders. Total holdings in 2005 were over 91,000 volumes with over 210 periodical subscriptions. From 2016 to 2017 the library underwent a major renovation, fixing the crumbling foundation of the library building. The library temporarily moved out to the former location of Bill's Lockeroom on Shoop Avenue until mid April 2017 before moving back in to the original library building on Elm Street.

== Media ==
The community is served by the Fulton County Expositor, an AIM Media Midwest newspaper. INTV-Channel 5 is the local television station.

== Medical care ==
Fulton County Health Center is a rural critical access hospital that includes an emergency department with a heliport for medical evacuation.

== Notable people ==
- James A. Boucher, former US Representative of Albany County, Wyoming
- James Massey, academic and information theorist
- Richard Mourdock, former Republican state treasurer of Indiana
- Barney Oldfield, racecar driver
- Jean Paul Slusser, painter, designer, art critic, professor, and director of the University of Michigan Museum of Art
- Stephen Stahl, psychiatrist, psychopharmacologist
- Rick Volk, member of the Baltimore Colts' Super Bowl III and V championship teams
- Marjorie M. Whiteman, International law expert and member of the Ohio Women's Hall of Fame
