= Lyon (disambiguation) =

Lyon is a city in France.

Lyon may also refer to:

== Places ==
=== United Kingdom ===
- Lyon, Perth and Kinross, Scotland, a location in the U.K.
- Loch Lyon, a lake in Scotland

=== United States ===
- Lyon, Mississippi
- Lyon, Missouri
- Lyon College, Batesville, Arkansas
- Lyon County (disambiguation)
- Lyon Mountain (disambiguation)
- Lyon Township (disambiguation)
- Lyon Village, Arlington, Virginia, a neighborhood
- Fort Lyon (disambiguation)

== People ==
- Lyon (surname)

== Ancestry and heraldry ==
- Lyon Court, the institution that regulates heraldry in Scotland
- Lord Lyon King of Arms, head of Lyon Court, a Scottish heraldic official
- Clan Lyon, Scottish clan associated with the lands of Glen Lyon in Perthshire, Scotland

== Arts and entertainment ==
- Lyon, the main antagonist in the video game Fire Emblem: The Sacred Stones
- Lyon, a major character in the video game Suikoden V
- Lyon School, a style of painting that flourished around 1800
- Merriman Lyon, a main character in Susan Cooper's The Dark Is Rising book series
- Lyon, an S-Type guitar manufactured by Washburn Guitars

== Business ==
- Lyon's, a chain of restaurants headquartered in the US state of California
- J. Lyons and Co., a chain of restaurants in England
- Lyon & Healy, US company which manufactured harps
- Lyon & Lyon, a US legal company

== Religion ==
- Council of Lyon, two 13th-century ecclesiastical councils held in Lyon, France
  - First Council of Lyon (1245), regarding the Crusades
  - Second Council of Lyon (1274), regarding papal election procedures

== Science ==
- Lyon hypothesis, see X-inactivation
- 9381 Lyon, a main-belt asteroid discovered in 1993

== Sports ==
- Olympique Lyonnais, a men's football club based in Lyon
- Olympique Lyonnais Féminin, a women's football club based in Lyon

== Naval vessels ==
- Lyon-class battleship, a proposed fleet of 4 battleships for the French Navy (1914)
- American steamship General Lyon (1864), a US steamship
- USS General Lyon (1860), a US warship in US Civil War
- USS Lyon (AP-71), a US warship of World War II

== See also ==
- Lyons (disambiguation)
- Lion (disambiguation)
- Lyonnaise (disambiguation)
- Justice Lyon (disambiguation)
