= Lyons (disambiguation) =

Lyons or Lyon is a city in France.

Lyons may also refer to:

== Places ==
=== Australia ===
- Lyons, Australian Capital Territory
- Lyons, Northern Territory
- Lyons, Queensland
- Division of Lyons (state), a state electoral division of Tasmania
- Division of Lyons, a federal electoral division of Tasmania

=== France ===
- Lyons-la-Forêt, France

=== Ireland ===
- Lyons Hill, Ireland

=== United States ===
- Lyons, Colorado
- Lyons, Georgia
- Lyons, Illinois
- Lyons, Indiana
- Lyons, Kansas
- Lyons, Michigan
- Lyons, Missouri
- Lyons, Nebraska
- Lyons, New Jersey
- Lyons, New York
  - Lyons (hamlet), New York
- Lyons Falls, New York
- Lyons, Ohio
- Lyons Switch, Oklahoma
- Lyons, Oregon
- Lyons, Pennsylvania
- Lyons, South Dakota
- Lyons, Texas
- Lyons, Wisconsin, a town
- Lyons (community), Wisconsin, an unincorporated community
- Lyons Township (disambiguation)

== People ==
- Lyons (surname)
- Lyons family, also de Lyons and Lyon, a prominent Anglo-Norman noble family
- Lyons Gray (born 1942), American politician
- Justice Lyons (disambiguation)

== Other uses ==
- Lyons (architecture firm), Australian company
- Lyons Female College, defunct American girls' school in Iowa
- The Lyons, 2011 play
- Lyon's, California restaurant chain
- J. Lyons and Co., British food company, once proprietor of Lyons Corner Houses
- Lyons Tea (Ireland), Irish tea company

== See also ==
- Lyon (disambiguation)
- Lion (disambiguation), including Lions
