= Lyons Township, Minnesota =

Lyons Township is the name of some places in the U.S. state of Minnesota:

- Lyons Township, Lyon County, Minnesota
- Lyons Township, Wadena County, Minnesota

See also: Lyons Township (disambiguation)
