= Advance, Ohio =

- Unincorporated community
- Location of Advance, Ohio
- Coordinates: 41.640575°N 84.112451°W
- Country: United States
- State: Ohio
- County: Fulton
- Township: Junction of Dover, Chesterfield, and Pike Townships
- Established: Unincorporated

Government
  - Type: Unincorporated
- Time zone: UTC-5 (Eastern (EST))
  - Summer (DST): UTC-4 (EDT)
- ZIP codes: 43567
- Area codes: 419 and 567

Advance is an unincorporated community at the junction of Dover, Chesterfield, and Pike Townships, in Fulton County, Ohio, United States, which is also the junction of County Road M and County Road 13.

== History ==
Advance had a United States Post Office that operated between 1893 and 1901.

Today, Advance remains a community recognized on county maps including the county Fire Districts map, and the county Tornado Sirens map. The tornado siren is located a few yards east of the junction in Pike Township, and serves residents and visitors of all three townships that meet in Advance.

Lyons Fire and EMS, located in Royalton Township, serves most of the residents and visitors of the community that are located north in Chesterfield and east in Pike Township, while Wauseon Fire and EMS serves the territory in the southwest quadrant of the junction in Dover Township.

The Village of Lyons also furnishes water to the large campground in Advance.

== Attractions ==
A private 115 acre campground with 800 campsites and a small golf course is located in Chesterfield Township, northeast of the junction.
