= Amboy Township, Ohio =

Township in Ohio, US

Amboy Township, Fulton County, Ohio
- Township
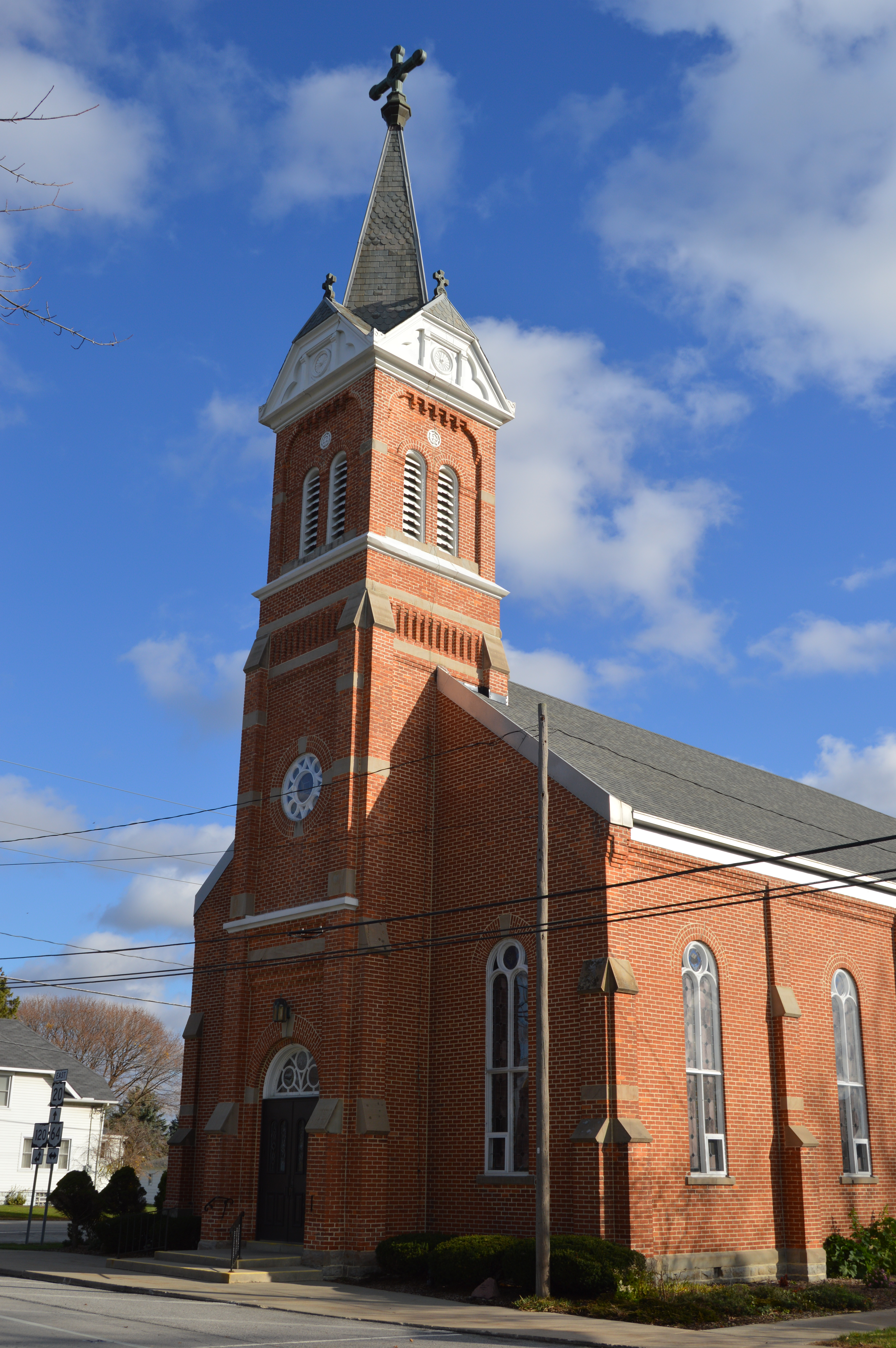
- Holy Trinity Catholic Church at Assumption

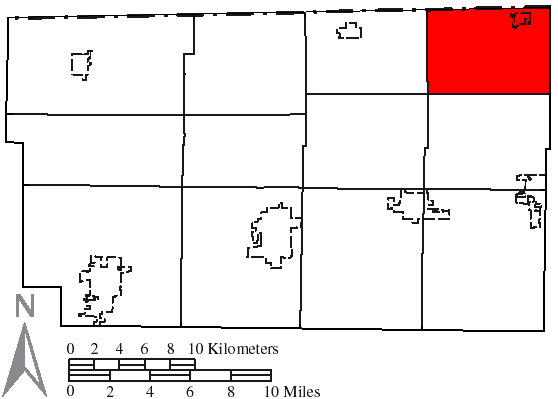
- Location of Amboy Township in Fulton County
- Coordinates: 41°41′56″N 83°56′17″W
- Country: United States
- State: Ohio
- County: Fulton

Area
  - Total: 25.9 sq mi (67.1 km^{2})
  - Land: 25.8 sq mi (66.9 km^{2})
  - Water: 0.077 sq mi (0.2 km^{2})
- Elevation: 725 ft (221 m)

Population (2020)
  - Total: 1,878
  - Density: 71/sq mi (27.6/km^{2})
- Time zone: UTC-5 (Eastern (EST))
  - Summer (DST): UTC-4 (EDT)
- FIPS code: 39-01728
- GNIS feature ID: 1086120

Amboy Township is one of the twelve townships of Fulton County, Ohio, United States. As of the 2020 census the population was 1,878, up from 1,846 at the 2010 census. 1,219 of the residents lived in the unincorporated portions of the township in 2010.

== Geography ==
Located in the northeastern corner of the county along the Michigan border, it borders the following townships:

- Ogden Township, Lenawee County, Michigan - north
- Riga Township, Lenawee County, Michigan - northeast corner
- Richfield Township, Lucas County - east
- Spencer Township, Lucas County - southeast corner
- Fulton Township - south
- Pike Township - southwest corner
- Royalton Township - west
- Fairfield Township, Lenawee County, Michigan - northwest corner

The village of Metamora is located in northeastern Amboy Township, and the unincorporated communities of Ai and Assumption lie in the township's south.

== Name and history ==
Amboy Township was organized in 1837. It is the only Amboy Township statewide.

Historical population
Census	Pop.	Note	%±
1960	1,727		—
1970	1,714		−0.8%
1980	1,596		−6.9%
1990	1,531		−4.1%
2000	1,549		1.2%
2010	1,846		19.2%
2020	1,878		1.7%
U.S. Decennial Census

== Government ==
The township is governed by a three-member board of trustees, who are elected in November of odd-numbered years to a four-year term beginning on the following January 1. Two are elected in the year after the presidential election and one is elected in the year before it. There is also an elected township fiscal officer, who serves a four-year term beginning on April 1 of the year after the election, which is held in November of the year before the presidential election. Vacancies in the fiscal officership or on the board of trustees are filled by the remaining trustees.
