= First Universalist Church of Lyons, Ohio =

Uniterian Universalist church from Lyons, Ohio

Coordinates: 41°41′58.8″N 84°04′09.3″W

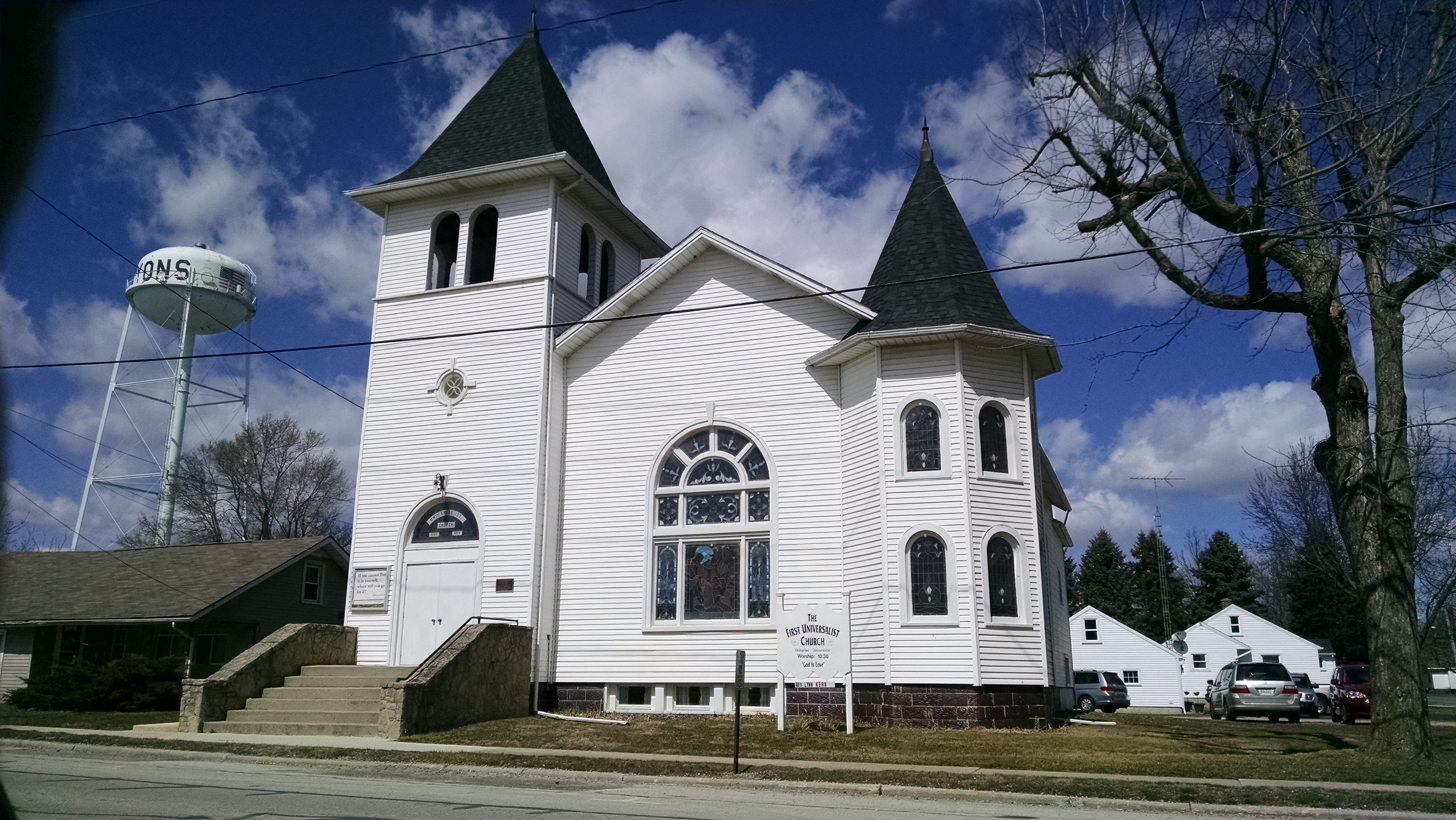
Front of church from Morenci Street

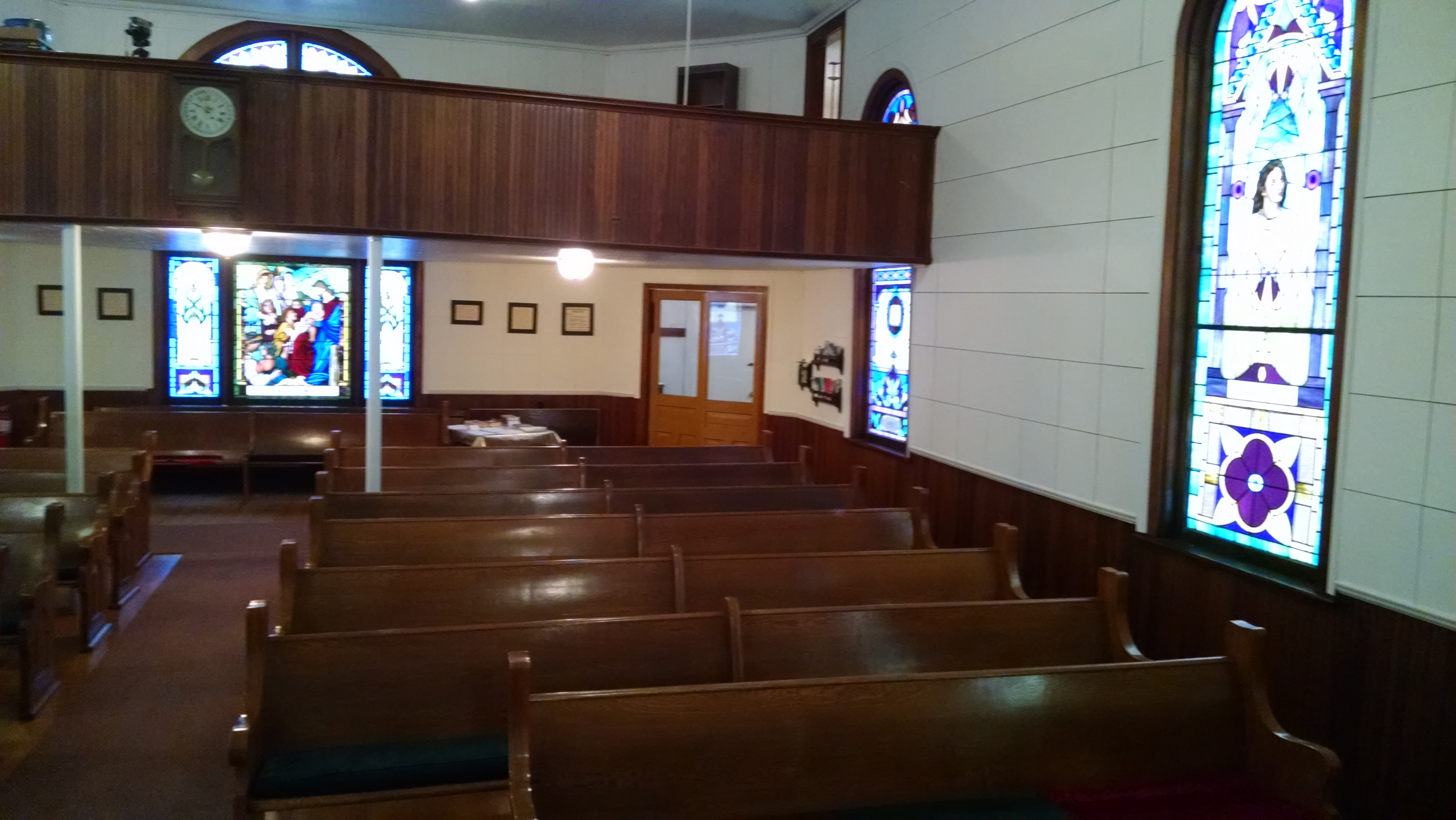
Inside of church.

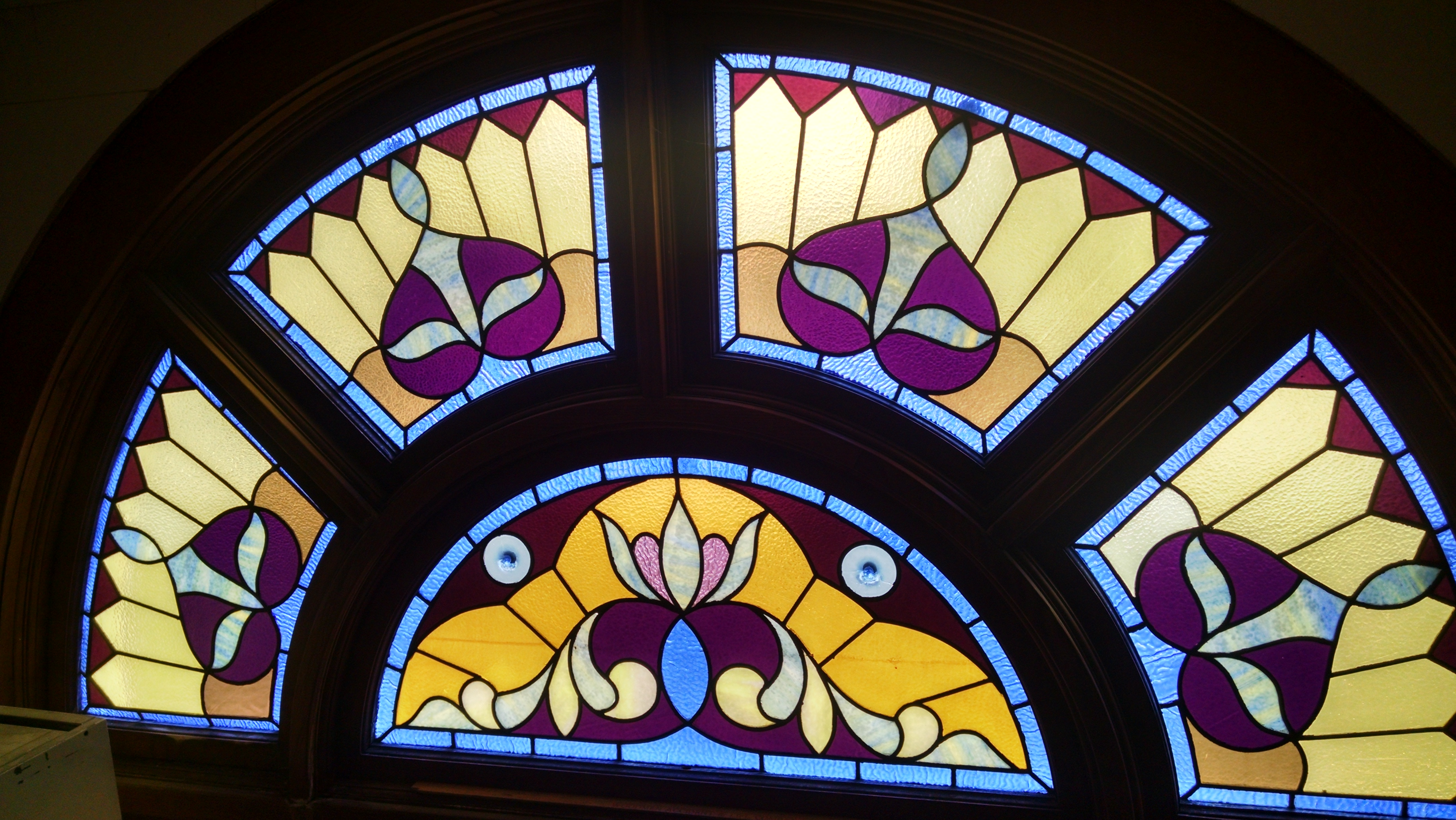
Top of front window from inside

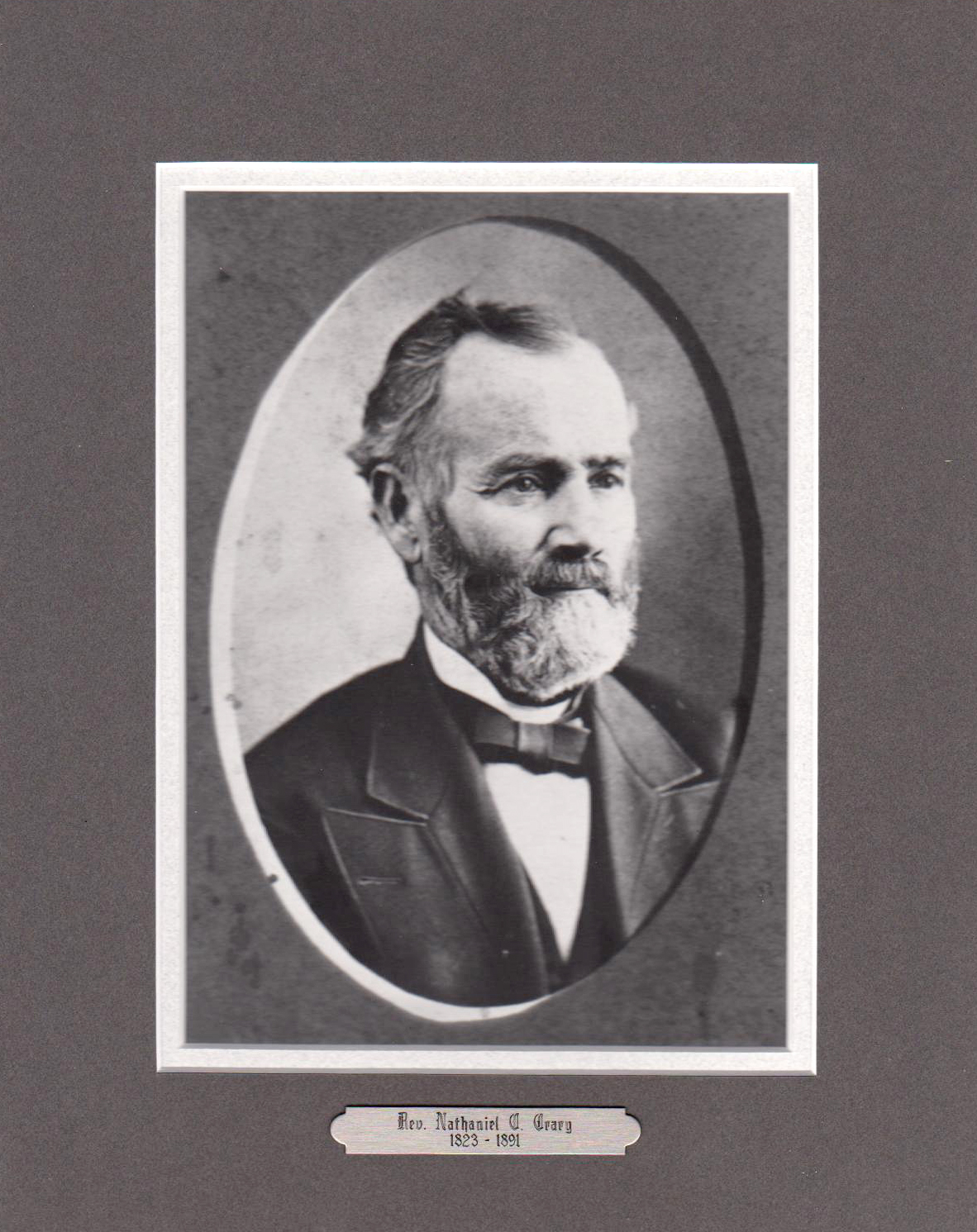
Rev. Crary, second minister of First Universalist Church

The First Universalist Church of Lyons, Ohio, located at 145 East Morenci Street, Lyons, Ohio is a member congregation of the Unitarian Universalist Association.

== History ==
The congregation first gathered in 1852; the church building was first constructed in 1868; an extensive renovation took place in 1904. The land for the church was donated by Jinks Morey, who was a Universalist and the founder of Morey's Corners, now known as Lyons, Ohio. The church building is the oldest remaining non-residential structure in Royalton Township, Fulton County, Ohio. A bronze plaque issued by the Fulton County Historical Society reads as follows:

THE FIRST UNIVERSALIST CHURCH
Congregation gathered in 1852
Church Dedicated October 18, 1868
Renovated and rededicated:
December 4, 1904
Erected on land donated by Jinks Morey,
Universalist and founder of
Morey's Corners, now Lyons, Ohio.
Oldest Royalton Township non-residential
structure remaining on its original site.
Fulton County Historical Society
Historic Building

== Links ==
- First Universalist Church of Lyons
- Unitarian Universalist Association
