= Chesterfield Township, Ohio =

Township in Ohio, US

Chesterfield Township, Fulton County, Ohio
- Township
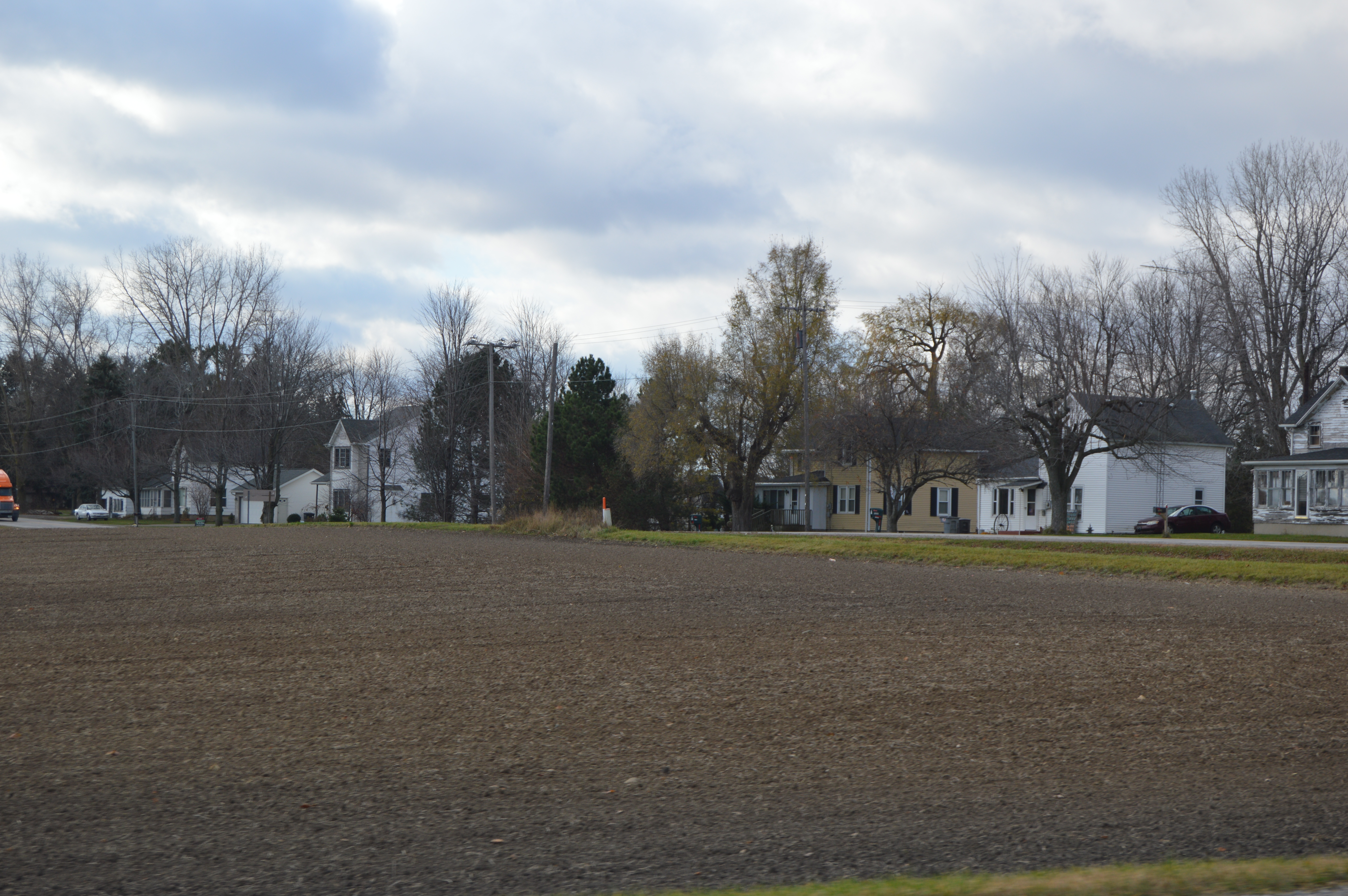
- Houses at Oakshade

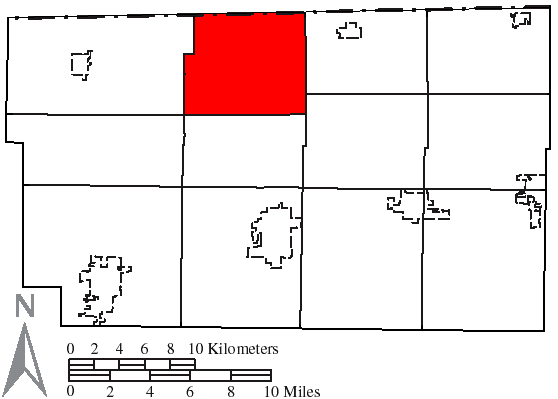
- Location of Chesterfield Township in Fulton County
- Coordinates: 41°40′46″N 84°9′49″W
- Country: United States
- State: Ohio
- County: Fulton

Area
  - Total: 29.1 sq mi (75.4 km^{2})
  - Land: 29.0 sq mi (75.1 km^{2})
  - Water: 0.12 sq mi (0.3 km^{2})
- Elevation: 810 ft (247 m)

Population (2020)
  - Total: 938
  - Density: 32.3/sq mi (12.5/km^{2})
- Time zone: UTC-5 (Eastern (EST))
  - Summer (DST): UTC-4 (EDT)
- FIPS code: 39-14072
- GNIS feature ID: 1086121

Chesterfield Township is one of the twelve townships of Fulton County, Ohio, United States. The 2020 census found 938 people in the township.

== Geography ==
Located in the northern part of the county along the Michigan border, it borders the following townships:

- Seneca Township, Lenawee County, Michigan - north
- Fairfield Township, Lenawee County, Michigan - northeast corner
- Royalton Township - east
- Pike Township - southeast
- Dover Township - south
- Franklin Township - southwest corner
- Gorham Township - west

The unincorporated communities of Advance, Denson, Inlet and Oakshade are located in Chesterfield Township.

== Name and history ==
Chesterfield Township was organized in 1837, and named for Chesterfield Clemons, a pioneer settler. It is the only Chesterfield Township statewide.

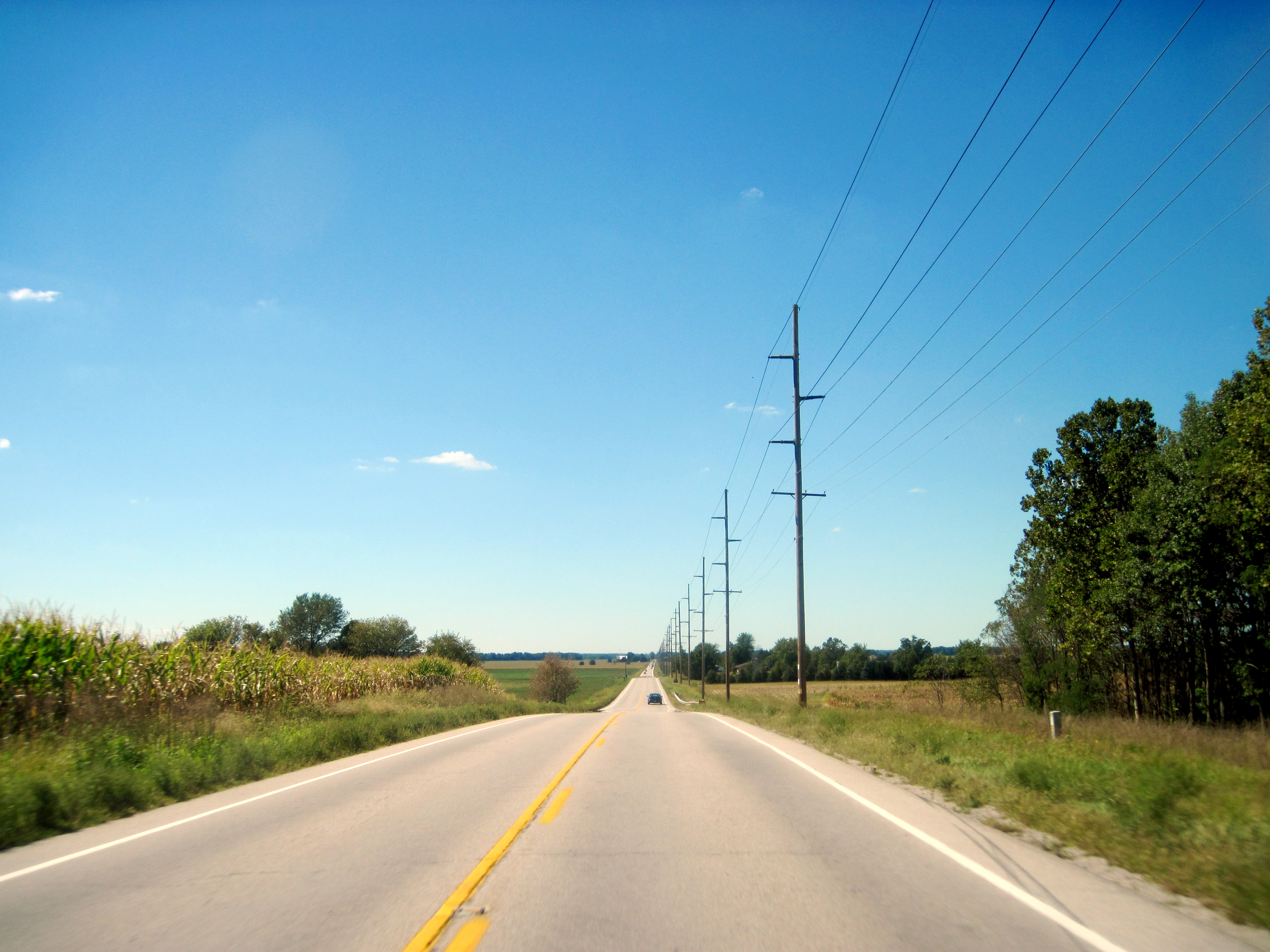
Westbound US 20 Chesterfield Township, Fulton County, Ohio, descending western edge of glacial Defiance Moraine

== Government ==
The township is governed by a three-member board of trustees, who are elected in November of odd-numbered years to a four-year term beginning on the following January 1. Two are elected in the year after the presidential election and one is elected in the year before it. There is also an elected township fiscal officer, who serves a four-year term beginning on April 1 of the year after the election, which is held in November of the year before the presidential election. Vacancies in the fiscal officership or on the board of trustees are filled by the remaining trustees.

== Public services ==
=== Public schools ===
Students from the township are served by the following public local school district:

- Evergreen Local School District

=== Mail ===
Mail is delivered in the township by the following U.S. Post Office locations:

- Fayette, Ohio 43521
- Lyons, Ohio 43533
- Wauseon, Ohio 43567

=== Telephone ===
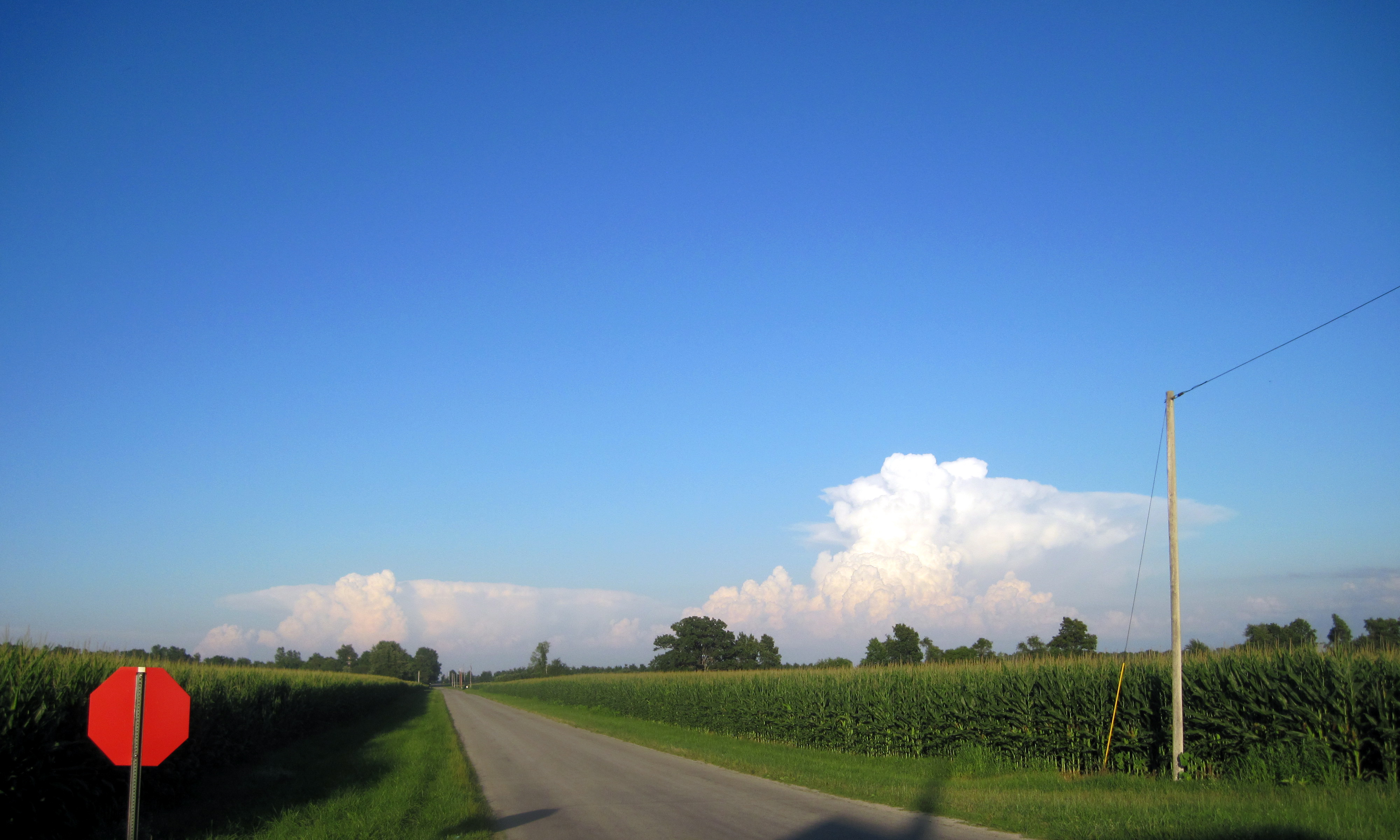
Looking east from Inlet on County Road N. Shadow of the Inlet Mennonite Church's steeple can be seen at the bottom.

Most of the township is within the Chesterfield telephone exchange, which is served by Windstream Ohio, with telephone numbers using the following Numbering Plan Code:

- 419-452

A northwestern portion is served by the Lyons telephone exchange, which is delivered by UTO (United Telephone Company of Ohio,) doing business as CenturyLink, with the following codes:

- 419-390
- 419-923

The southern section of the township is within the Wauseon exchange, again served by UTO, DBA CenturyLink:

- 419-330
- 419-335
- 419-337
- 419-388
- 419-404
- 419-583
- 419-590

=== Electric ===
Toledo Edison and Midwest Energy Cooperative serve the township with electricity.

=== Highways ===
- US 20
- SR 108
- SR 120

=== Fire and EMS ===
Morenci Area EMS in Morenci, Michigan serves most of the township, with Lyons Fire/EMS serving an eastern portion, and Wauseon Fire/EMS serving a small area in the south.
