= Inlet (disambiguation) =

An inlet is an indentation of a shoreline, usually long and narrow.

Inlet may also refer to:

- Inlet (album), a 2020 album by Hum
- Inlet, New York
- Inlet, Ohio
- Inlet, Wisconsin
- Engine inlet or intake, a component for admitting fluid into a system
  - Inlet cone
- Inlet valve, a pipe connection that points toward a service provider or holding tank
- Appliance inlet, a power connector that receives electrical power

== See also ==
- Bay
- Cove
- Estuary
- Firth
- Fjord
- Geo (landscape)
- Sea loch
- Sea lough
- Sound (geography)
