= Lyons Township =

Lyons Township is the name several townships in the United States:

== Illinois ==
- Lyons Township, Cook County, Illinois

== Iowa ==
- Lyons Township, Mills County, Iowa

== Michigan ==
- Lyons Township, Michigan

== Minnesota ==
- Lyons Township, Lyon County, Minnesota
- Lyons Township, Wadena County, Minnesota

== South Dakota ==
- Lyons Township, Minnehaha County, South Dakota

== See also ==
- Lyon Township (disambiguation)
