= Fulton County, Ohio =

County in Ohio, United States

- County
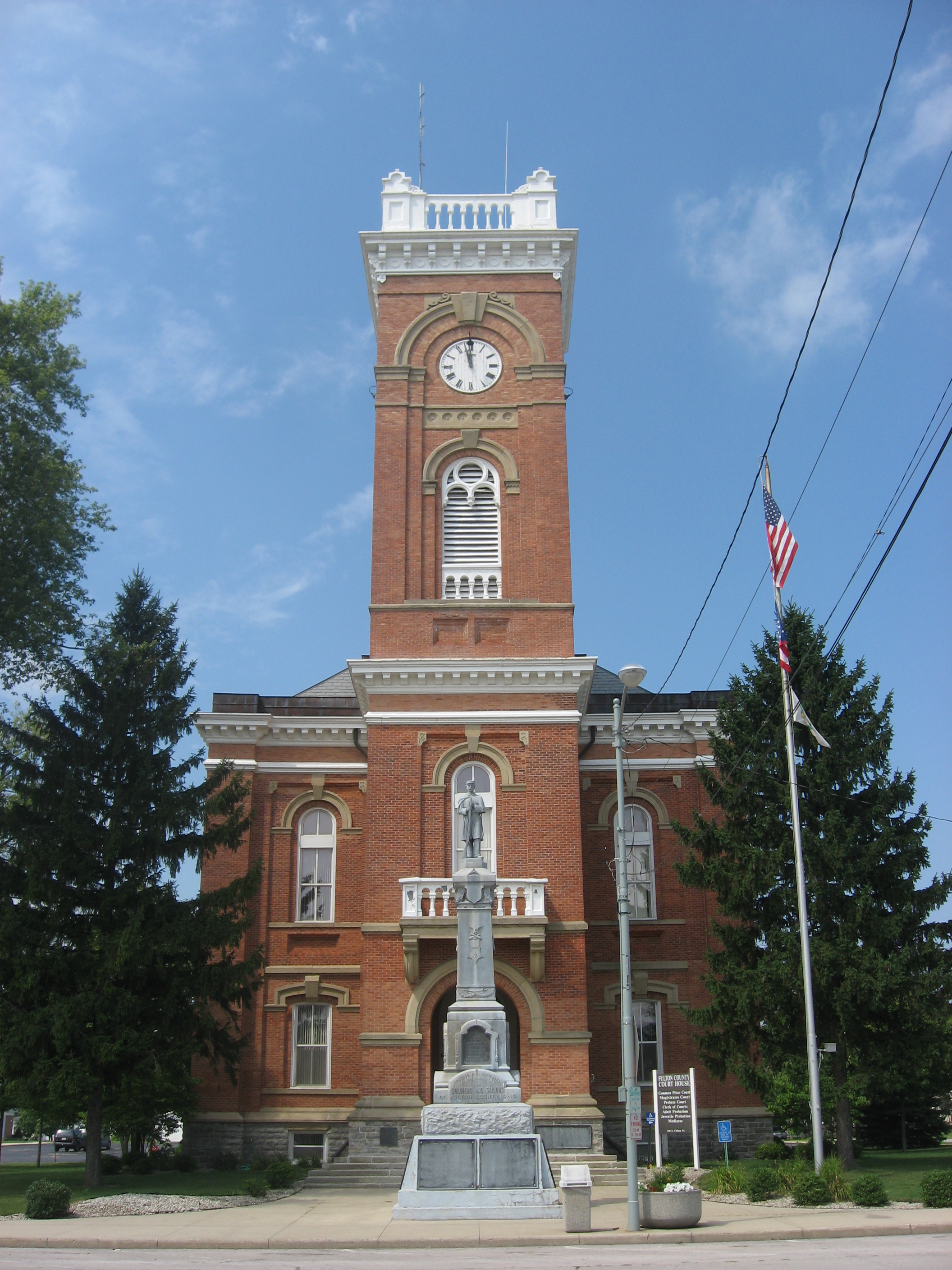
- Fulton County Courthouse

- Flag Seal

- Location within the U.S. state of Ohio
- Coordinates: 41°36′N 84°07′W
- Country: United States
- State: Ohio
- Founded: April 1, 1850
- Named for: Robert Fulton
- Seat: Wauseon
- Largest city: Wauseon

Area
  - Total: 407 sq mi (1,050 km^{2})
  - Land: 405 sq mi (1,050 km^{2})
  - Water: 1.8 sq mi (4.7 km^{2}) 0.4%

Population (2020)
  - Total: 42,713
  - Estimate (2025): 41,853 ▼
  - Density: 100/sq mi (39/km^{2})
- Time zone: UTC−5 (Eastern)
  - Summer (DST): UTC−4 (EDT)
- Congressional district: 9th
- Website: www.fultoncountyoh.com

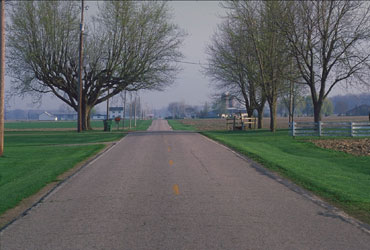
A rural road in Fulton County

Fulton County is a county located in the U.S. state of Ohio west of Toledo. As of the 2020 census, the population was 42,713. Its county seat and largest city is Wauseon. The county was created in 1850 with land from Henry, Lucas, and Williams counties and is named for Robert Fulton, inventor of the steamboat. Fulton County is a part of the Toledo metropolitan area.

== History ==
The first seat of justice in Fulton County was Ottokee, located there because of its central location in the county. A wooden courthouse was built in 1851.

However, a railroad was built further south. Wauseon sprung up in 1854 when the railroad was extended to that point, and incorporated in 1859. With the commercial success that the railroad brought to Wauseon, the citizens of the county voted to move the county seat to Wauseon in 1871. The Fulton County Courthouse was built in 1872.

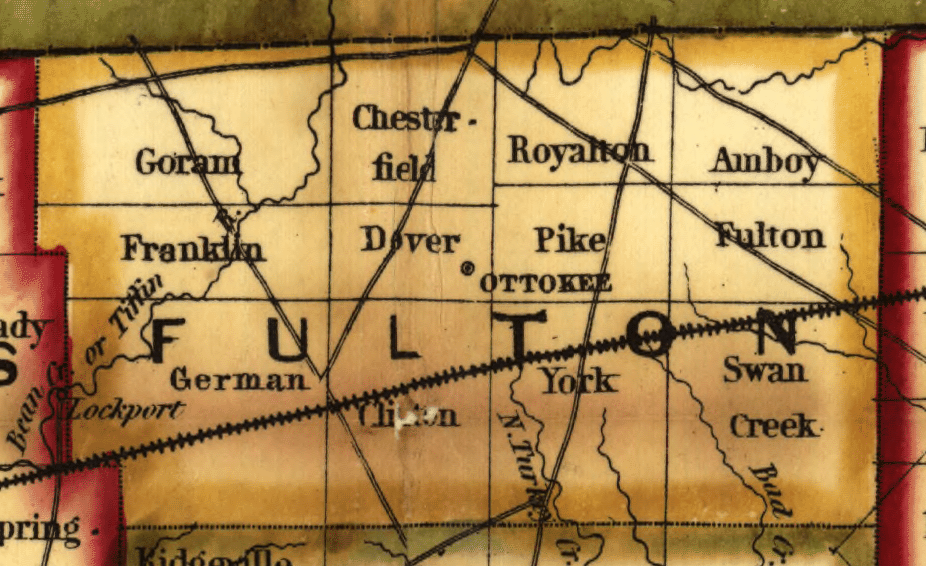
1851 Railroad map: Ottokee is the county seat of justice.

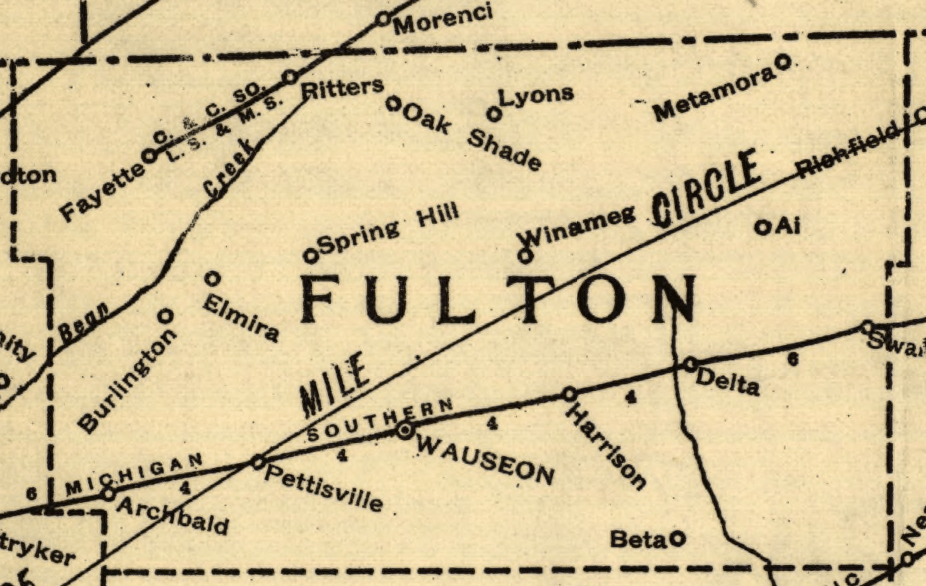
1890 Railroad map: Wauseon is now the county seat.

== Geography ==
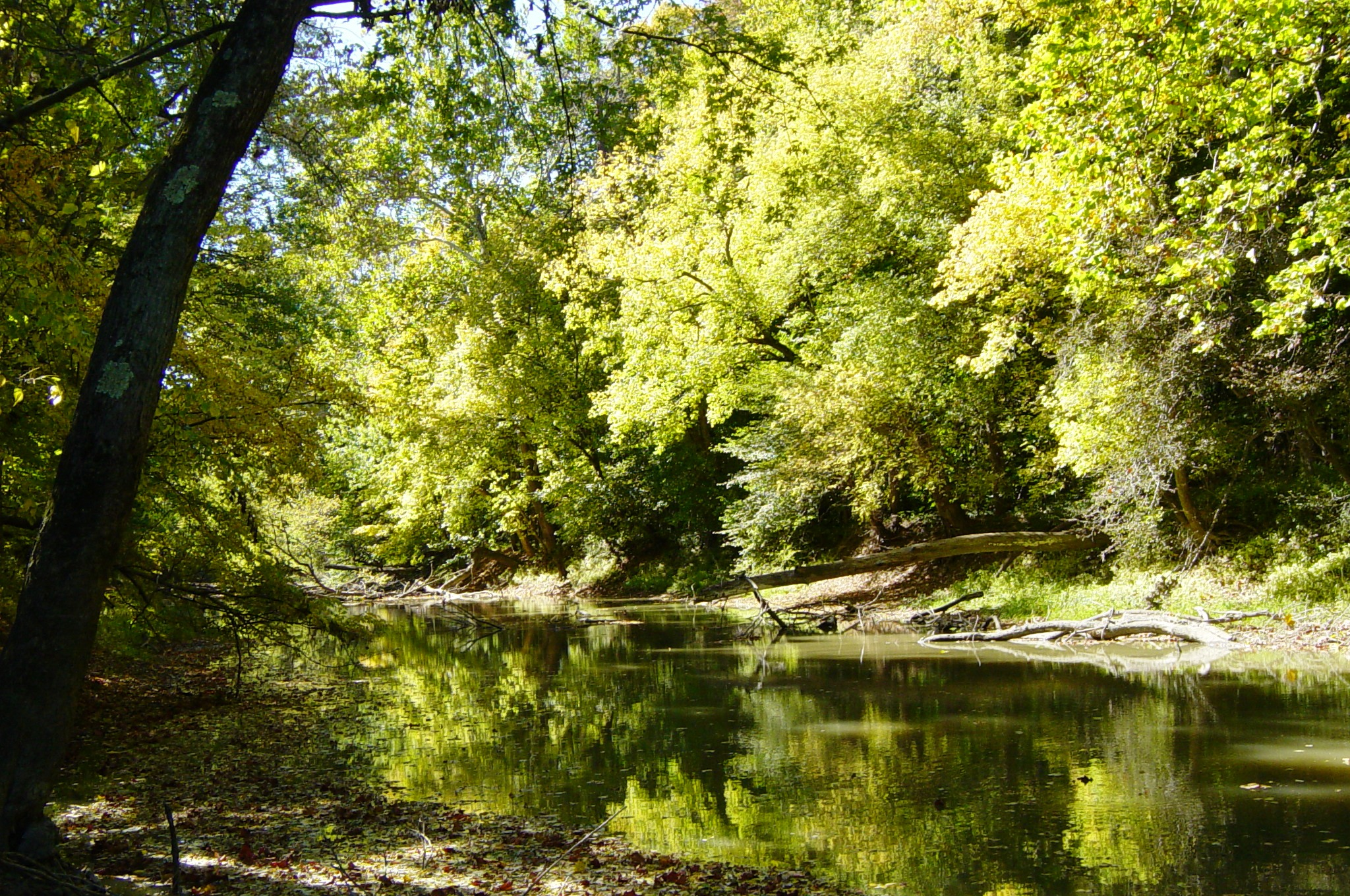
The Tiffin River near Goll Woods State Nature Preserve

According to the U.S. Census Bureau, the county has a total area of 407 square miles (1,050 km^{2}), of which 405 square miles (1,050 km^{2}) is land and 1.8 square miles (4.7 km^{2}) (0.4%) is water.

=== Adjacent counties ===
- Lenawee County, Michigan (north)
- Lucas County (east)
- Henry County (south)
- Williams County (west)
- Hillsdale County, Michigan (northwest)

=== Protected areas ===
- Goll Woods State Nature Preserve
- Harrison Lake State Park
- Maumee State Forest
- Tiffin River Wildlife Area
- Wabash Cannonball Trail

== Demographics ==
Historical population
Census	Pop.	Note	%±
1850	7,781		—
1860	14,043		80.5%
1870	17,789		26.7%
1880	21,053		18.3%
1890	22,023		4.6%
1900	22,801		3.5%
1910	23,914		4.9%
1920	23,445		−2.0%
1930	23,477		0.1%
1940	23,626		0.6%
1950	25,580		8.3%
1960	29,301		14.5%
1970	33,071		12.9%
1980	37,751		14.2%
1990	38,498		2.0%
2000	42,084		9.3%
2010	42,698		1.5%
2020	42,713		0.0%
2025 (est.)	41,853	▼	−2.0%
U.S. Decennial Census; 1790–1960 1900–1990; 1990–2000 2020

=== 2020 census ===
As of the 2020 census, the county had a population of 42,713. The median age was 41.8 years, with 23.5% of residents under the age of 18 and 19.5% aged 65 years or older. For every 100 females there were 99.4 males, and for every 100 females age 18 and over there were 96.6 males.

The racial makeup of the county was 89.2% White, 0.6% Black or African American, 0.3% American Indian and Alaska Native, 0.4% Asian, <0.1% Native Hawaiian and Pacific Islander, 3.2% from some other race, and 6.3% from two or more races. Hispanic or Latino residents of any race comprised 8.9% of the population.

17.8% of residents lived in urban areas, while 82.2% lived in rural areas.

There were 16,801 households in the county, of which 29.9% had children under the age of 18 living in them. Of all households, 54.7% were married-couple households, 17.0% were households with a male householder and no spouse or partner present, and 22.0% were households with a female householder and no spouse or partner present. About 25.5% of all households were made up of individuals and 12.6% had someone living alone who was 65 years of age or older.

There were 17,689 housing units, of which 5.0% were vacant. Among occupied housing units, 77.5% were owner-occupied and 22.5% were renter-occupied. The homeowner vacancy rate was 1.0% and the rental vacancy rate was 4.3%.

=== Racial and ethnic composition ===
Fulton County, Ohio – Racial and ethnic composition Note: the US Census treats Hispanic/Latino as an ethnic category. This table excludes Latinos from the racial categories and assigns them to a separate category. Hispanics/Latinos may be of any race.
Race / ethnicity (NH = Non-Hispanic)	Pop 1980	Pop 1990	Pop 2000	Pop 2010	Pop 2020	% 1980	% 1990	% 2000	% 2010	% 2020
White alone (NH)	35,854	36,367	39,011	38,569	36,968	94.97%	94.46%	92.70%	90.33%	86.55%
Black or African American alone (NH)	36	85	93	138	225	0.10%	0.22%	0.22%	0.32%	0.53%
Native American or Alaska Native alone (NH)	22	57	82	84	60	0.06%	0.15%	0.19%	0.20%	0.14%
Asian alone (NH)	82	134	172	176	152	0.22%	0.35%	0.41%	0.41%	0.36%
Native Hawaiian or Pacific Islander alone (NH)	x	x	12	4	6	x	x	0.03%	0.01%	0.01%
Other race alone (NH)	25	13	28	23	120	0.07%	0.03%	0.07%	0.05%	0.28%
Mixed race or Multiracial (NH)	x	x	264	363	1,391	x	x	0.63%	0.85%	3.26%
Hispanic or Latino (any race)	1,732	1,842	2,422	3,341	3,791	4.59%	4.78%	5.76%	7.82%	8.88%
Total	37,751	38,498	42,084	42,698	42,713	100.00%	100.00%	100.00%	100.00%	100.00%

=== 2010 census ===
As of the 2010 United States census, there were 42,698 people, 16,188 households, and 11,942 families living in the county. The population density was 105.3 inhabitants per square mile (40.7/km^{2}). There were 17,407 housing units at an average density of 42.9 units per square mile (16.6 units/km^{2}). The racial makeup of the county was 94.9% white, 0.4% black or African American, 0.4% Asian, 0.3% American Indian, 2.4% from other races, and 1.5% from two or more races. Those of Hispanic or Latino origin made up 7.8% of the population. In terms of ancestry, 45.5% were German, 11.9% were Irish, 10.7% were English, 6.9% were Polish, and 6.2% were American.

Of the 16,188 households, 34.6% had children under the age of 18 living with them, 59.8% were married couples living together, 9.3% had a female householder with no husband present, 26.2% were non-families, and 22.3% of all households were made up of individuals. The average household size was 2.61 and the average family size was 3.05. The median age was 39.9 years.

The median income for a household in the county was $50,717 and the median income for a family was $59,090. Males had a median income of $42,561 versus $30,070 for females. The per capita income for the county was $22,804. About 8.5% of families and 10.5% of the population were below the poverty line, including 14.4% of those under age 18 and 5.4% of those age 65 or over.

=== 2000 census ===
As of the census of 2000, there were 42,084 people, 15,480 households, and 11,687 families living in the county. The population density was 104 inhabitants per square mile (40/km^{2}). There were 16,232 housing units at an average density of 40 units per square mile (15/km^{2}). The racial makeup of the county was 95.65% White, 0.24% Black or African American, 0.26% Native American, 0.42% Asian, 0.04% Pacific Islander, 2.31% from other races, and 1.08% from two or more races. 5.76% of the population were Hispanic or Latino of any race.

There were 15,480 households, out of which 37.10% had children under the age of 18 living with them, 63.20% were married couples living together, 8.20% had a female householder with no husband present, and 24.50% were non-families. 21.10% of all households were made up of individuals, and 9.40% had someone living alone who was 65 years of age or older. The average household size was 2.69 and the average family size was 3.13.

In the county, the population was spread out, with 28.30% under the age of 18, 7.70% from 18 to 24, 28.70% from 25 to 44, 22.60% from 45 to 64, and 12.70% who were 65 years of age or older. The median age was 36 years. For every 100 females there were 95.60 males. For every 100 females age 18 and over, there were 93.30 males.

The median income for a household in the county was $44,074, and the median income for a family was $50,952. Males had a median income of $36,180 versus $25,137 for females. The per capita income for the county was $18,999. About 4.00% of families and 5.40% of the population were below the poverty line, including 6.10% of those under age 18 and 4.60% of those age 65 or over.

== Politics ==
Since 1936, Fulton County has largely voted for Republican candidates for president. The only Democrats to win Fulton were Franklin Pierce in 1852 and Franklin D. Roosevelt in his 1932 election., it also voted for Theodore Roosevelt (of the "Bull Moose" Progressive Party) in 1912.

United States presidential election results for Fulton County, Ohio
Year	Republican		Democratic		Third party(ies)	
Year	No.	%	No.	%	No.	%
1856	1,098	56.77%	772	39.92%	64	3.31%
1860	1,629	61.63%	984	37.23%	30	1.14%
1864	1,953	66.86%	968	33.14%	0	0.00%
1868	2,171	65.37%	1,150	34.63%	0	0.00%
1872	2,210	71.57%	826	26.75%	52	1.68%
1876	2,697	61.99%	1,597	36.70%	57	1.31%
1880	2,912	60.65%	1,787	37.22%	102	2.12%
1884	2,848	56.90%	1,904	38.04%	253	5.05%
1888	2,901	55.72%	1,997	38.36%	308	5.92%
1892	2,808	55.34%	1,919	37.82%	347	6.84%
1896	3,227	55.99%	2,464	42.75%	73	1.27%
1900	3,457	59.49%	2,262	38.93%	92	1.58%
1904	3,593	69.12%	1,448	27.86%	157	3.02%
1908	3,608	61.24%	2,131	36.17%	153	2.60%
1912	929	17.64%	1,805	34.28%	2,531	48.07%
1916	2,933	52.97%	2,507	45.28%	97	1.75%
1920	6,111	73.88%	2,049	24.77%	111	1.34%
1924	4,951	69.56%	1,333	18.73%	834	11.72%
1928	6,416	77.74%	1,788	21.66%	49	0.59%
1932	4,487	48.02%	4,673	50.01%	184	1.97%
1936	6,152	60.17%	3,582	35.04%	490	4.79%
1940	8,653	77.38%	2,530	22.62%	0	0.00%
1944	8,258	79.37%	2,147	20.63%	0	0.00%
1948	6,523	70.67%	2,672	28.95%	35	0.38%
1952	9,191	78.18%	2,565	21.82%	0	0.00%
1956	9,030	77.50%	2,622	22.50%	0	0.00%
1960	9,695	74.76%	3,274	25.24%	0	0.00%
1964	5,973	51.59%	5,604	48.41%	0	0.00%
1968	7,817	64.14%	3,338	27.39%	1,033	8.48%
1972	8,387	68.55%	3,615	29.55%	232	1.90%
1976	7,891	60.94%	4,850	37.45%	208	1.61%
1980	9,519	64.72%	3,972	27.01%	1,216	8.27%
1984	11,412	72.55%	4,217	26.81%	101	0.64%
1988	10,230	66.31%	5,076	32.90%	122	0.79%
1992	8,358	44.45%	5,576	29.65%	4,870	25.90%
1996	8,703	48.60%	6,662	37.20%	2,542	14.20%
2000	11,546	61.10%	6,805	36.01%	545	2.88%
2004	13,640	62.13%	8,224	37.46%	90	0.41%
2008	11,689	53.10%	9,900	44.97%	424	1.93%
2012	11,738	55.08%	9,073	42.58%	499	2.34%
2016	13,709	64.20%	6,069	28.42%	1,575	7.38%
2020	15,731	68.98%	6,664	29.22%	411	1.80%
2024	15,893	70.44%	6,374	28.25%	297	1.32%

United States Senate election results for Fulton County, Ohio1
Year	Republican		Democratic		Third party(ies)	
Year	No.	%	No.	%	No.	%
2024	14,450	65.44%	6,764	30.63%	868	3.93%

== Transportation ==
=== Airport ===
Fulton County Airport is a public use airport located four nautical miles (5 mi, 7 km) north of the central business district of Wauseon, Ohio. It is owned by the Fulton County Commissioners.

=== Highways ===
- Ohio Turnpike
  - I-80
  - I-90
- US 20
- US 20A
- US 127
- SR 2
- SR 64
- SR 66
- SR 108
- SR 109
- SR 120

== Communities ==
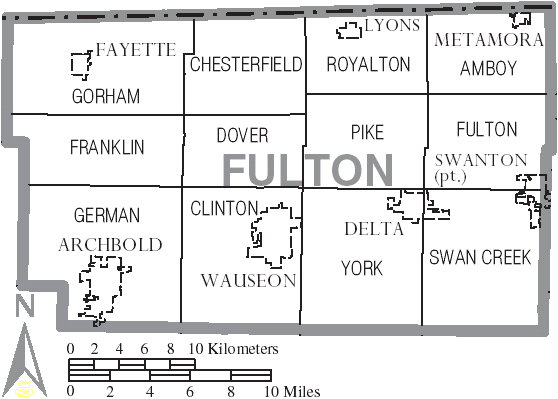
Map of Fulton County, Ohio with Municipal and Township Labels

=== City ===
- Wauseon (county seat)

=== Villages ===
- Archbold
- Delta
- Fayette
- Lyons
- Metamora
- Swanton

=== Census-designated places ===
- Ai
- Pettisville
- Tedrow

=== Unincorporated communities ===
- Advance
- Assumption
- Burlington
- Denson
- Elmira
- Inlet
- Lytton
- Oakshade
- Ottokee
- Winameg
- Zone

== Government ==
Certain aspects of county government are managed through subdivisional townships.

=== Townships ===
- Amboy
- Chesterfield
- Clinton
- Dover
- Franklin
- Fulton
- German
- Gorham
- Pike
- Royalton
- Swan Creek
- York

== See also ==
- National Register of Historic Places listings in Fulton County, Ohio
