= Lytton, Ohio =

Unincorporated community in Ohio, U.S.

Coordinates: 41°39′22″N 83°57′19″W

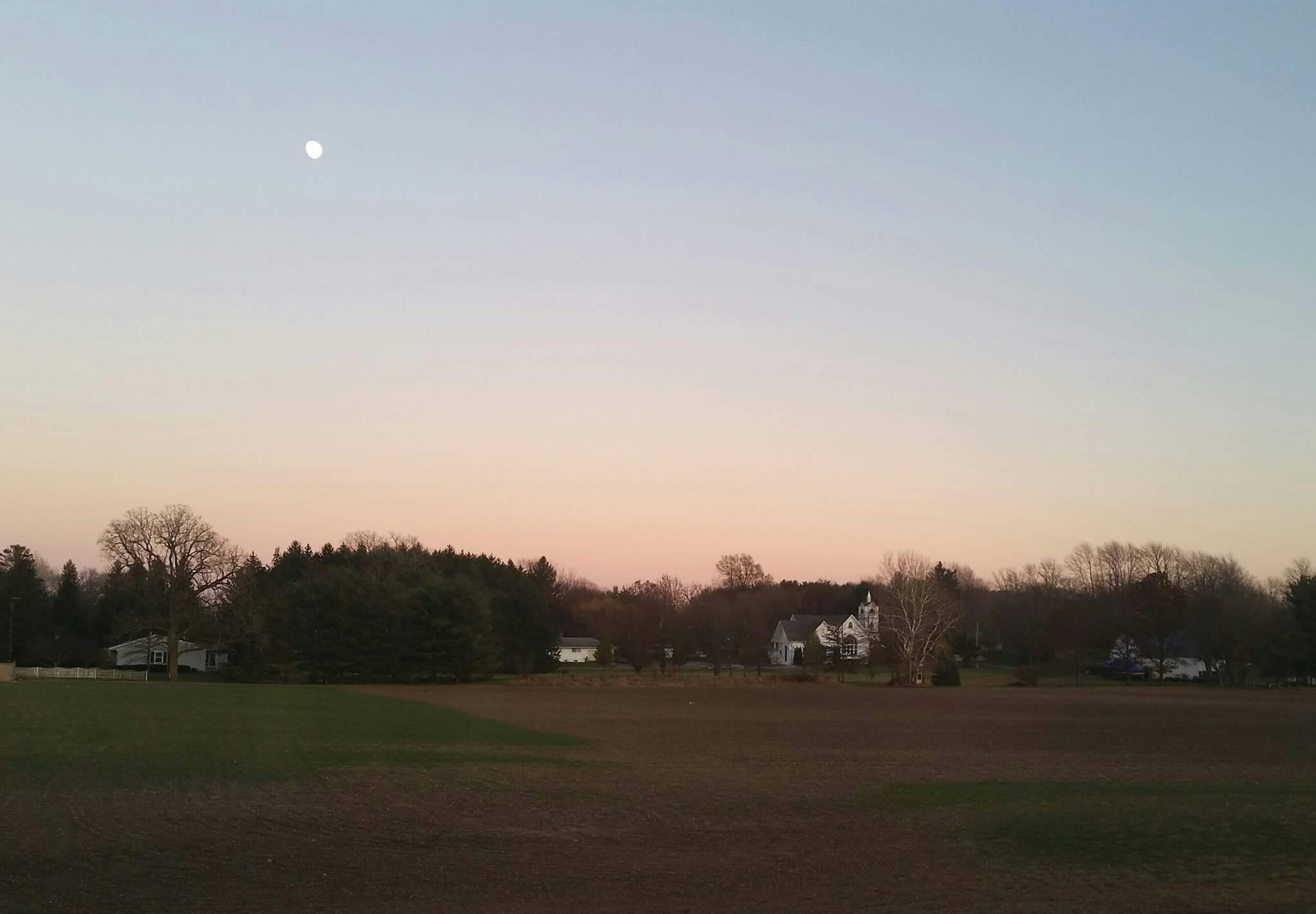
Lytton, Ohio, facing east, near dusk

Lytton is an unincorporated community in Fulton County, in the U.S. state of Ohio.

== History ==
A post office called Lyton was established in 1893, and remained in operation until 1903. Lytton also had a country store.
