= Denson, Ohio =

Unincorporated community in Ohio, United States

Coordinates: 41°42′19″N 84°8′52″W

Denson is an unincorporated community in Fulton County, in the U.S. state of Ohio.

== History ==
A post office called Denson was established in 1897, and remained in operation until 1909. In 1920, Denson was one of three communities listed in Chesterfield Township.
