= 1932 United States presidential election in Ohio =

- November 8, 1932

Nominee	Franklin D. Roosevelt	Herbert Hoover
Party	Democratic	Republican
Home state	New York	California
Running mate	John Nance Garner	Charles Curtis
Electoral vote	26	0
Popular vote	1,301,695	1,227,319
Percentage	49.88%	47.03%
County results
Roosevelt
40–50%
50–60%
60–70%
70–80%
Hoover
40–50%
50–60%
60–70%
President before election
Herbert Hoover
Republican
Elected President
Franklin D. Roosevelt
Democratic

The 1932 United States presidential election in Ohio was held on November 8, 1932, as part of the 1932 United States presidential election. State voters chose 26 electors to the Electoral College, who voted for president and vice president.

Ohio was narrowly won by the Democratic Party candidate, Franklin D. Roosevelt, with 49.88% of the popular vote. The Republican Party candidate, President Herbert Hoover, garnered 47.03% of the popular vote. As of the 2024 presidential election, this is the only election since the Civil War in which Fulton County has voted for a Democratic presidential candidate, and the last when Union County has done so.

Ohio voted almost 15% more Republican than the nation amidst the Democratic landslide, a lean which it has not exceeded since.

== Results ==
1932 United States presidential election in Ohio
Party	Candidate	Votes	Percentage	Electoral votes
Democratic	Franklin D. Roosevelt	1,301,695	49.88%	26
Republican	Herbert Hoover (incumbent)	1,227,319	47.03%	0
Socialist	Norman Thomas	64,094	2.46%	0
Prohibition	William Upshaw	7,421	0.28%	0
Communist	William Foster	7,231	0.28%	0
Socialist Labor	Verne L. Reynolds	1,968	0.08%	0
Totals		2,609,728	100.0%	26

=== Results by county ===
County	Franklin D. Roosevelt Democratic		Herbert Hoover Republican		Norman Thomas Socialist		Various candidates Other parties		Margin		Total votes cast
County	#	%	#	%	#	%	#	%	#	%	Total votes cast
Adams	5,909	54.06%	4,857	44.43%	53	0.48%	112	1.02%	1,052	9.62%	10,931
Allen	16,676	52.23%	14,678	45.97%	421	1.32%	155	0.49%	1,998	6.26%	31,930
Ashland	7,302	51.84%	6,549	46.49%	127	0.90%	108	0.77%	753	5.35%	14,086
Ashtabula	11,386	40.26%	15,644	55.31%	1,071	3.79%	181	0.64%	-4,258	-15.06%	28,282
Athens	8,915	46.09%	9,897	51.17%	396	2.05%	135	0.70%	-982	-5.08%	19,343
Auglaize	8,036	60.83%	5,039	38.15%	106	0.80%	29	0.22%	2,997	22.69%	13,210
Belmont	20,291	55.01%	15,029	40.75%	846	2.29%	719	1.95%	5,262	14.27%	36,885
Brown	6,601	61.91%	3,930	36.86%	70	0.66%	61	0.57%	2,671	25.05%	10,662
Butler	22,516	51.16%	19,673	44.70%	1,601	3.64%	218	0.50%	2,843	6.46%	44,008
Carroll	2,802	37.31%	4,487	59.75%	139	1.85%	82	1.09%	-1,685	-22.44%	7,510
Champaign	6,396	50.31%	6,191	48.70%	43	0.34%	82	0.65%	205	1.61%	12,712
Clark	17,314	46.86%	19,028	51.49%	432	1.17%	178	0.48%	-1,714	-4.64%	36,952
Clermont	8,662	51.97%	7,684	46.10%	223	1.34%	98	0.59%	978	5.87%	16,667
Clinton	5,252	46.20%	5,953	52.37%	107	0.94%	56	0.49%	-701	-6.17%	11,368
Columbiana	14,284	40.32%	19,707	55.62%	1,098	3.10%	341	0.96%	-5,423	-15.31%	35,430
Coshocton	8,188	56.26%	6,040	41.50%	146	1.00%	181	1.24%	2,148	14.76%	14,555
Crawford	10,593	60.47%	6,538	37.32%	305	1.74%	81	0.46%	4,055	23.15%	17,517
Cuyahoga	185,731	50.12%	166,337	44.89%	15,480	4.18%	3,030	0.82%	19,394	5.23%	370,578
Darke	11,122	55.92%	8,284	41.65%	188	0.95%	295	1.48%	2,838	14.27%	19,889
Defiance	6,532	61.65%	3,871	36.54%	144	1.36%	48	0.45%	2,661	25.12%	10,595
Delaware	6,196	46.59%	6,833	51.38%	193	1.45%	78	0.59%	-637	-4.79%	13,300
Erie	10,765	57.13%	7,666	40.68%	380	2.02%	32	0.17%	3,099	16.45%	18,843
Fairfield	10,410	55.66%	8,050	43.04%	145	0.78%	99	0.53%	2,360	12.62%	18,704
Fayette	5,157	54.24%	4,254	44.74%	56	0.59%	41	0.43%	903	9.50%	9,508
Franklin	58,539	44.97%	67,957	52.21%	2,925	2.25%	739	0.57%	-9,418	-7.24%	130,160
Fulton	4,673	50.01%	4,487	48.02%	112	1.20%	72	0.77%	186	1.99%	9,344
Gallia	4,190	41.89%	5,646	56.45%	126	1.26%	40	0.40%	-1,456	-14.56%	10,002
Geauga	2,396	37.12%	3,836	59.44%	193	2.99%	29	0.45%	-1,440	-22.31%	6,454
Greene	6,600	42.63%	8,455	54.62%	325	2.10%	101	0.65%	-1,855	-11.98%	15,481
Guernsey	9,026	49.85%	8,750	48.33%	214	1.18%	116	0.64%	276	1.52%	18,106
Hamilton	123,109	49.43%	118,804	47.70%	6,205	2.49%	958	0.38%	4,305	1.73%	249,076
Hancock	9,370	49.16%	9,260	48.58%	247	1.30%	184	0.97%	110	0.58%	19,061
Hardin	8,717	54.20%	7,215	44.86%	89	0.55%	63	0.39%	1,502	9.34%	16,084
Harrison	3,512	41.62%	4,759	56.39%	74	0.88%	94	1.11%	-1,247	-14.78%	8,439
Henry	6,987	68.58%	3,067	30.10%	90	0.88%	44	0.43%	3,920	38.48%	10,188
Highland	7,079	50.07%	6,924	48.98%	67	0.47%	67	0.47%	155	1.10%	14,137
Hocking	5,287	56.56%	3,811	40.77%	198	2.12%	52	0.56%	1,476	15.79%	9,348
Holmes	4,096	66.28%	1,953	31.60%	104	1.68%	27	0.44%	2,143	34.68%	6,180
Huron	8,795	49.69%	8,702	49.16%	155	0.88%	49	0.28%	93	0.53%	17,701
Jackson	5,543	44.03%	6,932	55.06%	67	0.53%	48	0.38%	-1,389	-11.03%	12,590
Jefferson	16,066	50.93%	14,179	44.95%	869	2.75%	430	1.36%	1,887	5.98%	31,544
Knox	7,008	45.25%	8,272	53.42%	126	0.81%	80	0.52%	-1,264	-8.16%	15,486
Lake	6,801	35.43%	11,792	61.43%	546	2.84%	57	0.30%	-4,991	-26.00%	19,196
Lawrence	8,157	48.22%	8,598	50.83%	118	0.70%	42	0.25%	-441	-2.61%	16,915
Licking	13,904	49.99%	13,355	48.01%	373	1.34%	183	0.66%	549	1.97%	27,815
Logan	6,678	46.53%	7,469	52.04%	94	0.65%	111	0.77%	-791	-5.51%	14,352
Lorain	18,753	45.77%	20,897	51.00%	1,061	2.59%	260	0.63%	-2,144	-5.23%	40,971
Lucas	64,902	55.44%	47,796	40.83%	3,366	2.88%	996	0.85%	17,106	14.61%	117,060
Madison	4,722	50.10%	4,631	49.13%	33	0.35%	40	0.42%	91	0.97%	9,426
Mahoning	33,139	43.68%	39,713	52.35%	2,520	3.32%	489	0.64%	-6,574	-8.67%	75,861
Marion	10,354	53.29%	8,569	44.10%	335	1.72%	171	0.88%	1,785	9.19%	19,429
Medina	5,841	41.50%	7,753	55.09%	438	3.11%	42	0.30%	-1,912	-13.59%	14,074
Meigs	5,105	45.40%	5,964	53.04%	133	1.18%	42	0.37%	-859	-7.64%	11,244
Mercer	8,462	70.94%	3,314	27.78%	75	0.63%	78	0.65%	5,148	43.16%	11,929
Miami	10,677	45.62%	12,157	51.95%	430	1.84%	138	0.59%	-1,480	-6.32%	23,402
Monroe	5,263	64.61%	2,767	33.97%	59	0.72%	57	0.70%	2,496	30.64%	8,146
Montgomery	51,270	48.50%	49,267	46.60%	4,683	4.43%	497	0.47%	2,003	1.89%	105,717
Morgan	3,107	42.67%	3,957	54.34%	184	2.53%	34	0.47%	-850	-11.67%	7,282
Morrow	3,849	49.31%	3,811	48.82%	46	0.59%	100	1.28%	38	0.49%	7,806
Muskingum	13,378	44.17%	16,366	54.04%	330	1.09%	211	0.70%	-2,988	-9.87%	30,285
Noble	3,966	49.45%	3,950	49.25%	29	0.36%	75	0.94%	16	0.20%	8,020
Ottawa	6,817	64.73%	3,600	34.18%	98	0.93%	17	0.16%	3,217	30.55%	10,532
Paulding	4,165	55.64%	3,201	42.77%	68	0.91%	51	0.68%	964	12.88%	7,485
Perry	6,714	45.76%	7,255	49.44%	639	4.35%	65	0.44%	-541	-3.69%	14,673
Pickaway	6,414	58.81%	4,395	40.30%	43	0.39%	55	0.50%	2,019	18.51%	10,907
Pike	5,107	64.58%	2,743	34.69%	31	0.39%	27	0.34%	2,364	29.89%	7,908
Portage	9,662	48.36%	9,586	47.98%	637	3.19%	96	0.48%	76	0.38%	19,981
Preble	6,221	53.51%	5,205	44.77%	158	1.36%	41	0.35%	1,016	8.74%	11,625
Putnam	8,078	68.00%	3,646	30.69%	96	0.81%	59	0.50%	4,432	37.31%	11,879
Richland	15,225	53.90%	12,531	44.36%	291	1.03%	202	0.72%	2,694	9.54%	28,249
Ross	10,542	52.12%	9,575	47.34%	71	0.35%	39	0.19%	967	4.78%	20,227
Sandusky	10,299	52.84%	8,915	45.74%	220	1.13%	56	0.29%	1,384	7.10%	19,490
Scioto	15,817	47.09%	17,225	51.28%	470	1.40%	78	0.23%	-1,408	-4.19%	33,590
Seneca	11,894	55.88%	9,007	42.32%	301	1.41%	82	0.39%	2,887	13.56%	21,284
Shelby	8,299	65.14%	4,281	33.60%	107	0.84%	54	0.42%	4,018	31.54%	12,741
Stark	35,757	44.89%	40,672	51.06%	2,613	3.28%	612	0.77%	-4,915	-6.17%	79,654
Summit	53,965	50.95%	47,691	45.03%	3,473	3.28%	782	0.74%	6,274	5.92%	105,911
Trumbull	17,871	41.64%	23,029	53.66%	1,776	4.14%	237	0.55%	-5,158	-12.02%	42,913
Tuscarawas	16,648	55.67%	12,369	41.36%	688	2.30%	200	0.67%	4,279	14.31%	29,905
Union	4,943	49.58%	4,912	49.27%	58	0.58%	56	0.56%	31	0.31%	9,969
Van Wert	7,977	56.66%	5,918	42.04%	110	0.78%	73	0.52%	2,059	14.63%	14,078
Vinton	2,655	48.99%	2,715	50.10%	23	0.42%	26	0.48%	-60	-1.11%	5,419
Warren	5,547	42.13%	7,421	56.37%	142	1.08%	55	0.42%	-1,874	-14.23%	13,165
Washington	10,208	51.36%	9,352	47.05%	240	1.21%	76	0.38%	856	4.31%	19,876
Wayne	10,870	49.19%	10,787	48.82%	340	1.54%	100	0.45%	83	0.38%	22,097
Williams	6,860	54.46%	5,459	43.34%	201	1.60%	77	0.61%	1,401	11.12%	12,597
Wood	11,332	50.78%	10,566	47.34%	313	1.40%	107	0.48%	766	3.43%	22,318
Wyandot	5,451	57.32%	3,939	41.42%	78	0.82%	41	0.43%	1,512	15.90%	9,509
Totals	1,301,695	49.88%	1,227,319	47.03%	64,094	2.46%	16,620	0.64%	74,376	2.85%	2,609,728

==== Counties that flipped from Republican to Democratic ====
- Adams
- Ashland
- Allen
- Belmont
- Auglaize
- Brown
- Butler
- Champaign
- Clermont
- Coshocton
- Cuyahoga
- Crawford
- Darke
- Defiance
- Erie
- Fairfield
- Fayette
- Fulton
- Guernsey
- Hamilton
- Hardin
- Hancock
- Henry
- Highland
- Hocking
- Holmes
- Huron
- Jefferson
- Licking
- Lucas
- Madison
- Marion
- Monroe
- Montgomery
- Morrow
- Noble
- Ottawa
- Paulding
- Pike
- Pickaway
- Portage
- Preble
- Richland
- Ross
- Sandusky
- Seneca
- Shelby
- Summit
- Tuscarawas
- Van Wert
- Union
- Washington
- Wayne
- Williams
- Wood
- Wyandot

== See also ==
- United States presidential elections in Ohio
