= Oakshade, Ohio =

Unincorporated community in Ohio, U.S.

Coordinates: 41°40′8″N 84°9′9″W

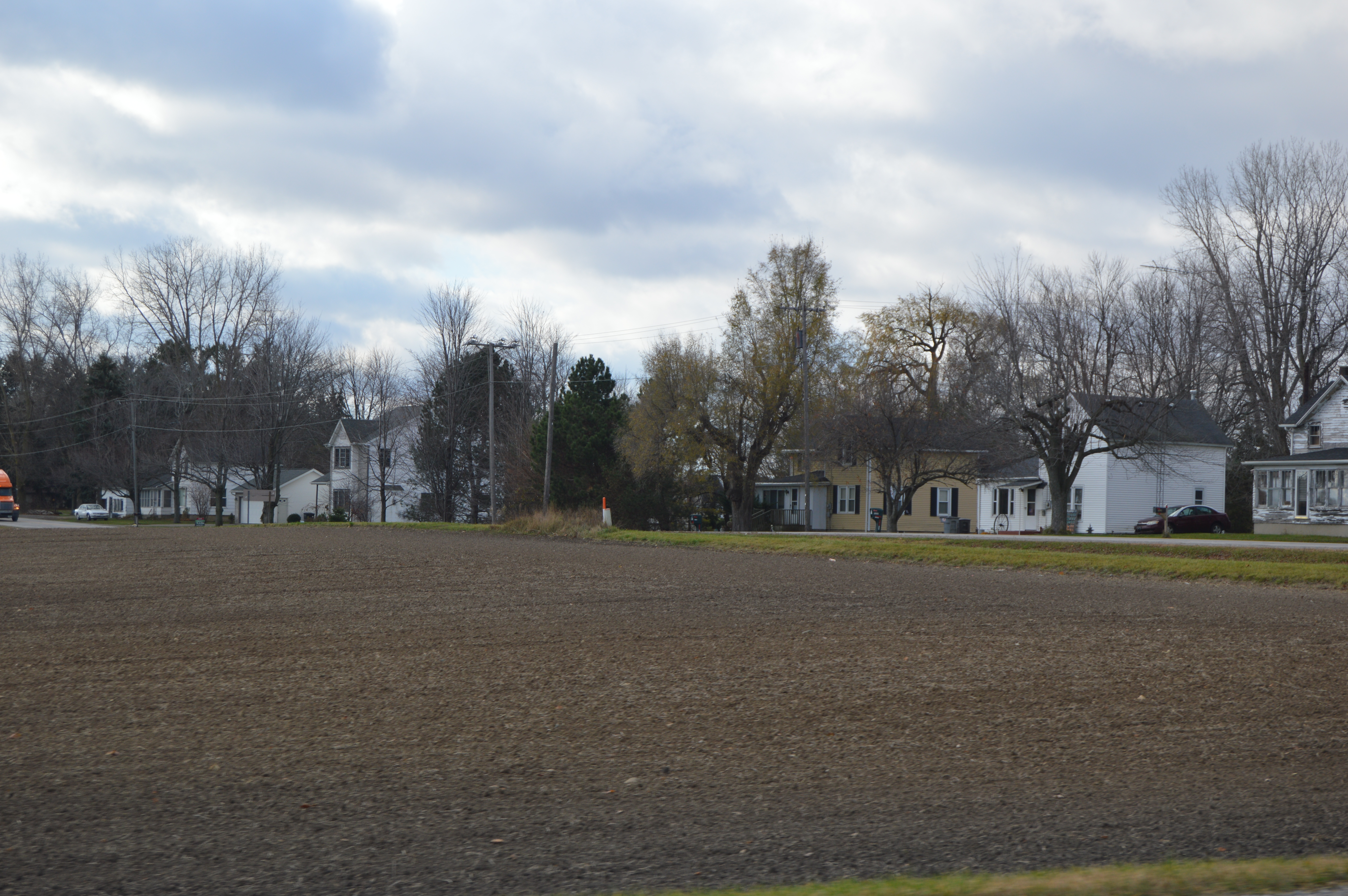
Houses on State Route 108, seen from U.S. Route 20

Oakshade is an unincorporated community in Fulton County, in the U.S. state of Ohio.

== History ==
A post office called Oak Shade was established in 1874, the name was changed to Oakshade in 1893, and the post office closed in 1910. In 1920, Oakshade was one of three communities listed in Chesterfield Township.
