= Pike Township, Fulton County, Ohio =

Township in Ohio, US

- Township
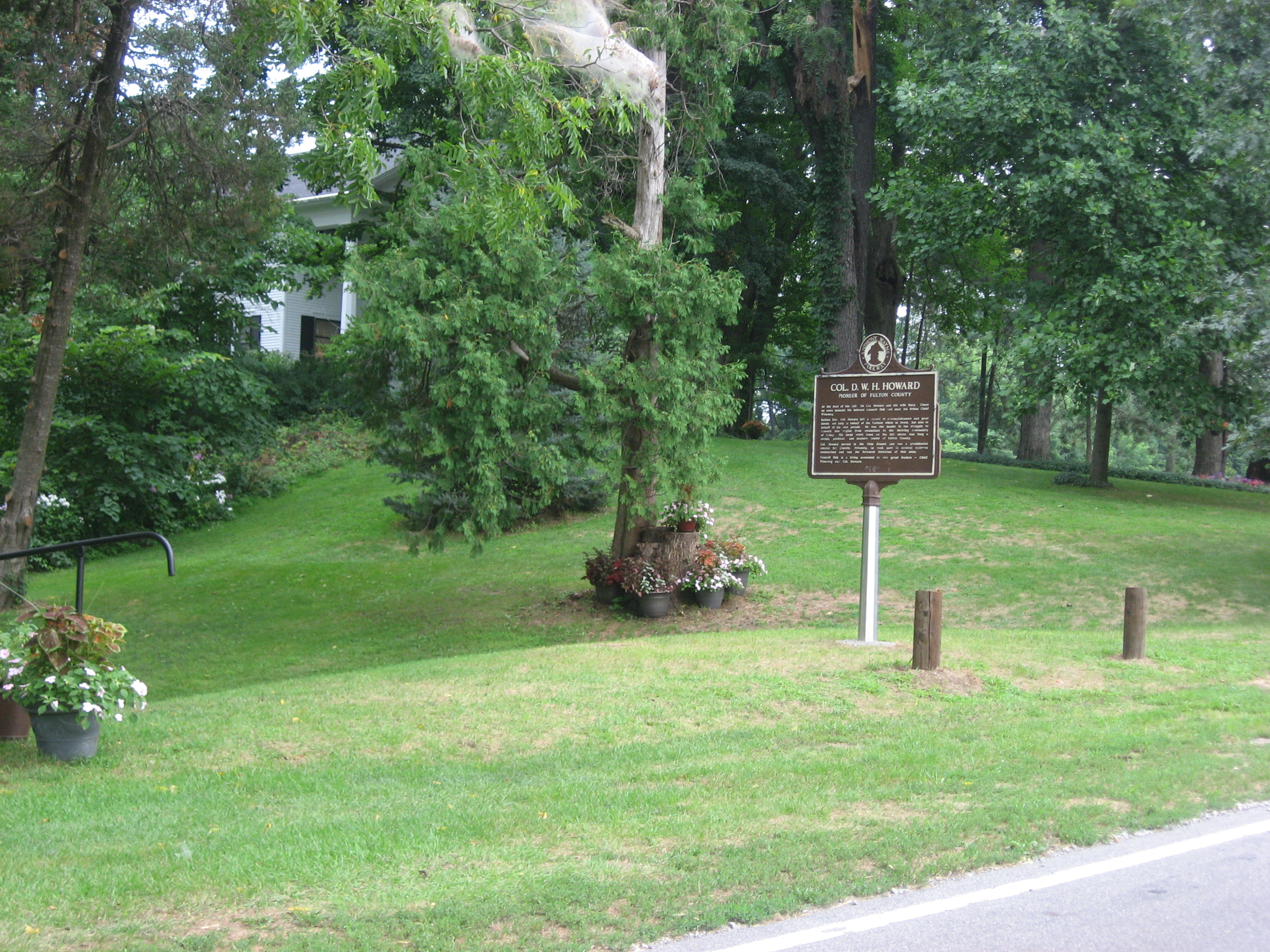
- One of the Winameg Mounds in the township, built by Hopewellian peoples

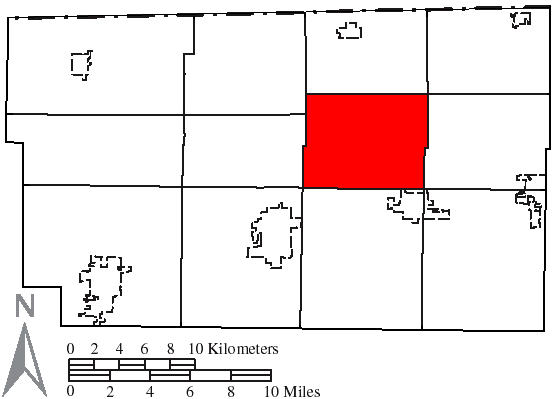
- Location of Pike Township in Fulton County
- Coordinates: 41°37′5″N 84°3′6″W
- Country: United States
- State: Ohio
- County: Fulton

Area
  - Total: 28.3 sq mi (73.2 km^{2})
  - Land: 28.1 sq mi (72.7 km^{2})
  - Water: 0.19 sq mi (0.5 km^{2})
- Elevation: 751 ft (229 m)

Population (2020)
  - Total: 1,733
  - Density: 61.7/sq mi (23.8/km^{2})
- Time zone: UTC-5 (Eastern (EST))
  - Summer (DST): UTC-4 (EDT)
- FIPS code: 39-62638
- GNIS feature ID: 1086128

Pike Township is one of the twelve townships of Fulton County, Ohio, United States. As of the 2020 census the population was 1,733.

== Geography ==
Located in the central part of the county, it borders the following townships:

- Royalton Township – north
- Amboy Township – northeast corner
- Fulton Township – east
- Swan Creek Township – southeast corner
- York Township – south
- Clinton Township – southwest corner
- Dover Township – west
- Chesterfield Township – northwest

It is one of only two townships in the county without a border on another county.

The unincorporated community of Winameg is in Pike Township, while Advance lies on the western border, at the junction with Dover and Chesterfield Townships.

== Name and history ==
It is one of eight Pike Townships statewide.

== Government ==
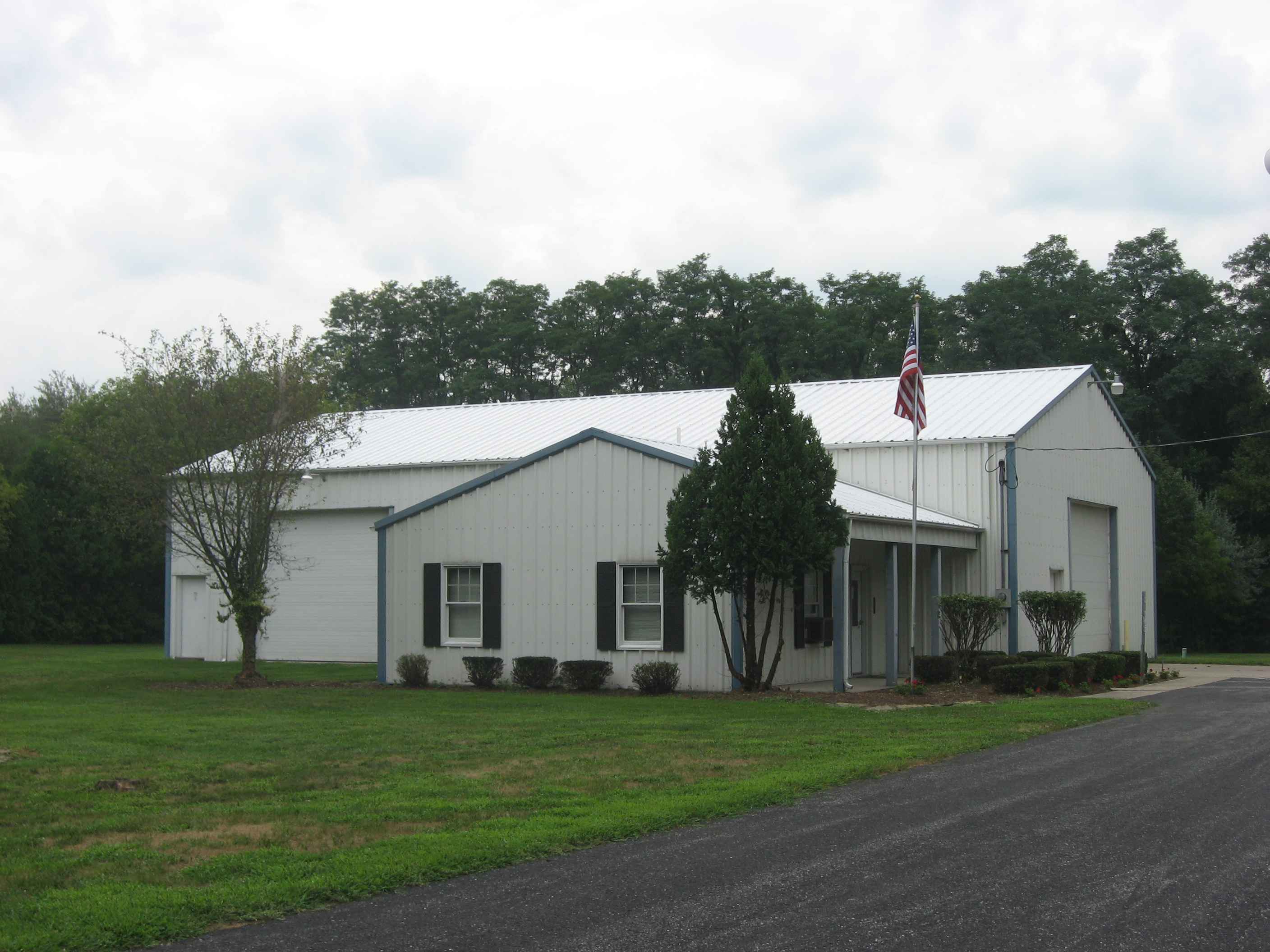
Pike Township Hall in Winameg

The township is governed by a three-member board of trustees, who are elected in November of odd-numbered years to a four-year term beginning on the following January 1. Two are elected in the year after the presidential election and one is elected in the year before it. There is also an elected township fiscal officer, who serves a four-year term beginning on April 1 of the year after the election, which is held in November of the year before the presidential election. Vacancies in the fiscal officership or on the board of trustees are filled by the remaining trustees.
