= Assumption, Ohio =

Unincorporated community in Ohio, U.S.

Coordinates: 41°40′19″N 83°54′42″W

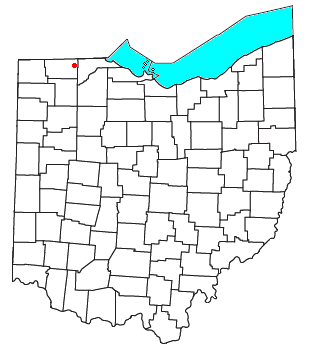
Location of Assumption in Ohio

Assumption is an unincorporated community in Amboy Township, Fulton County, Ohio, United States. A part of the Toledo Metropolitan Area, it is 7 miles (11 km) north of Swanton.

== History ==
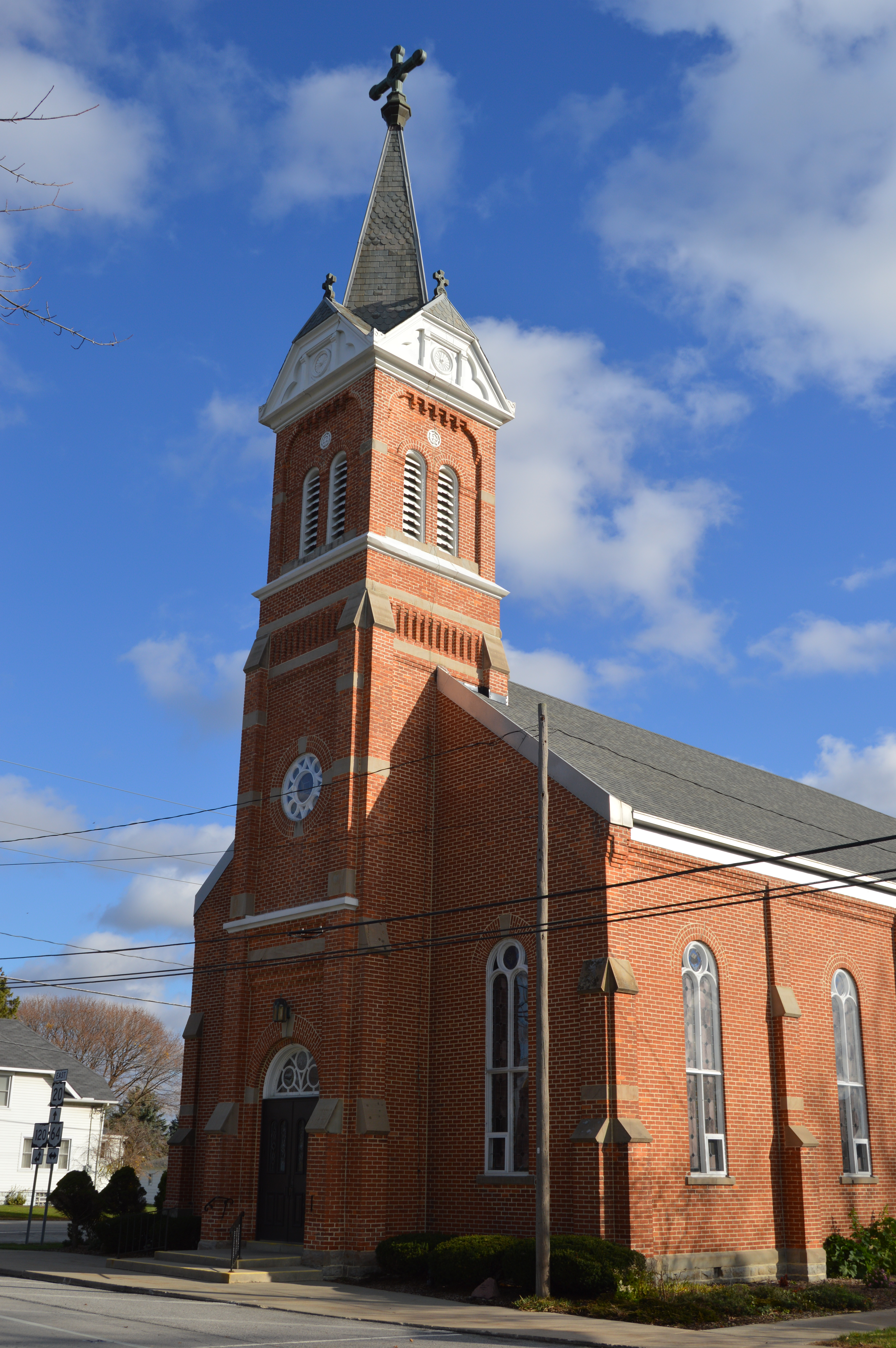
Holy Trinity Catholic Church

Assumption was originally named St. Mary's Corners because it was the location of St. Mary's Catholic Church. In 1840, the area was called both Caraghar's Corners and Caraghar, after an early Irish settler of the area named Patrick Caraghar. Along with Caraghar came the Savage family originated (likely) from County Down, Northern Ireland (U.K.). Hugh Savage and his wife Bridget Savage helped establish St. Mary's Catholic Church or present day (Holy Trinity Catholic Church). Their names can be found both in inside the Church and across the street in the local commentary.
