= Fort Lyon (disambiguation) =

Fort Lyon may refer to:

- Fort Lyon, Colorado, a U.S. Army fort used until 1897
  - Fort Lyon National Cemetery
- Fort Lyon, Colorado, an unincorporated town
- Fort Lyon (Virginia), part of the defenses of Washington DC during the American Civil War
- Fort Lyon (Maine), a coast defense fort active 1905-1946
- Fort Lyon, former name of Fort Wingate, near Gallup, New Mexico
- Camp Lyon (California), sometimes called Fort Lyon, established in 1862 and later abandoned
