= Lyon Mountain =

Lyon Mountain may refer to:

== Towns ==
- Lyon Mountain, New York

== Mountains ==
- Lyon Mountain (Clinton County, New York)
- Lyon Mountain (Delaware County, New York)
