= Lyons Township, Lyon County, Minnesota =

Lyons Township, Minnesota
- Township
- Location within the state of Minnesota Lyons Township, Minnesota (the United States)
- Coordinates: 44°20′2″N 95°54′26″W
- Country: United States
- State: Minnesota
- County: Lyon

Area
  - Total: 35.5 sq mi (91.9 km^{2})
  - Land: 35.2 sq mi (91.1 km^{2})
  - Water: 0.31 sq mi (0.8 km^{2})
- Elevation: 1,496 ft (456 m)

Population (2000)
  - Total: 208
  - Density: 6.0/sq mi (2.3/km^{2})
- Time zone: UTC-6 (Central (CST))
  - Summer (DST): UTC-5 (CDT)
- FIPS code: 27-38834
- GNIS feature ID: 0664849

Lyons Township is a township in Lyon County, Minnesota, United States, not to be confused with Lyons Township in Wadena County. The population was 208 at the 2000 census.

Lyons Township was organized in 1873, and named after Lyon, in France.

== Geography ==
According to the United States Census Bureau, the township has a total area of 35.5 square miles (91.9 km^{2}), of which 35.2 square miles (91.1 km^{2}) is land and 0.3 square miles (0.8 km^{2}) is water.

== Demographics ==
At the 2000 census, there were 208 people, 73 households and 58 families residing in the township. The population density was 5.9 per square mile (2.3/km^{2}). There were 76 housing units at an average density of 2.2/sq mi (0.8/km^{2}). The racial makeup of the township was 94.71% White, 0.48% Native American, 4.33% Asian, and 0.48% from two or more races. Hispanic or Latino people of any race were 2.40% of the population.

There were 73 households, of which 39.7% had children under the age of 18 living with them, 75.3% were married couples living together, and 20.5% were non-families. 13.7% of all households were made up of individuals, and 5.5% had someone living alone who was 65 years of age or older. The average household size was 2.85 and the average family size was 3.17.

Age distribution was 29.8% under the age of 18, 5.3% from 18 to 24, 33.2% from 25 to 44, 24.0% from 45 to 64, and 7.7% who were 65 years of age or older. The median age was 36 years. For every 100 females, there were 131.1 males. For every 100 females age 18 and over, there were 124.6 males.

The median household income was $36,250, and the median family income was $40,313. Males had a median income of $24,125 versus $22,500 for females. The per capita income for the township was $13,625. About 3.0% of families and 6.5% of the population were below the poverty line, including 3.2% of those under the age of eighteen and 14.3% of those 65 or over.
