= Justice Lyons =

Justice Lyons may refer to:

- Champ Lyons (born 1940), associate justice of the Supreme Court of Alabama
- Henry A. Lyons (1809–1872), chief justice of the Supreme Court California
- Peter Lyons (Virginia judge) (c. 1734–1809), associate justice of the Virginia Supreme Court

== See also ==
- Justice Lyon (disambiguation)
