= Inlet, Ohio =

Unincorporated community in Ohio, U.S.

Coordinates: 41°39′14″N 84°11′10″W

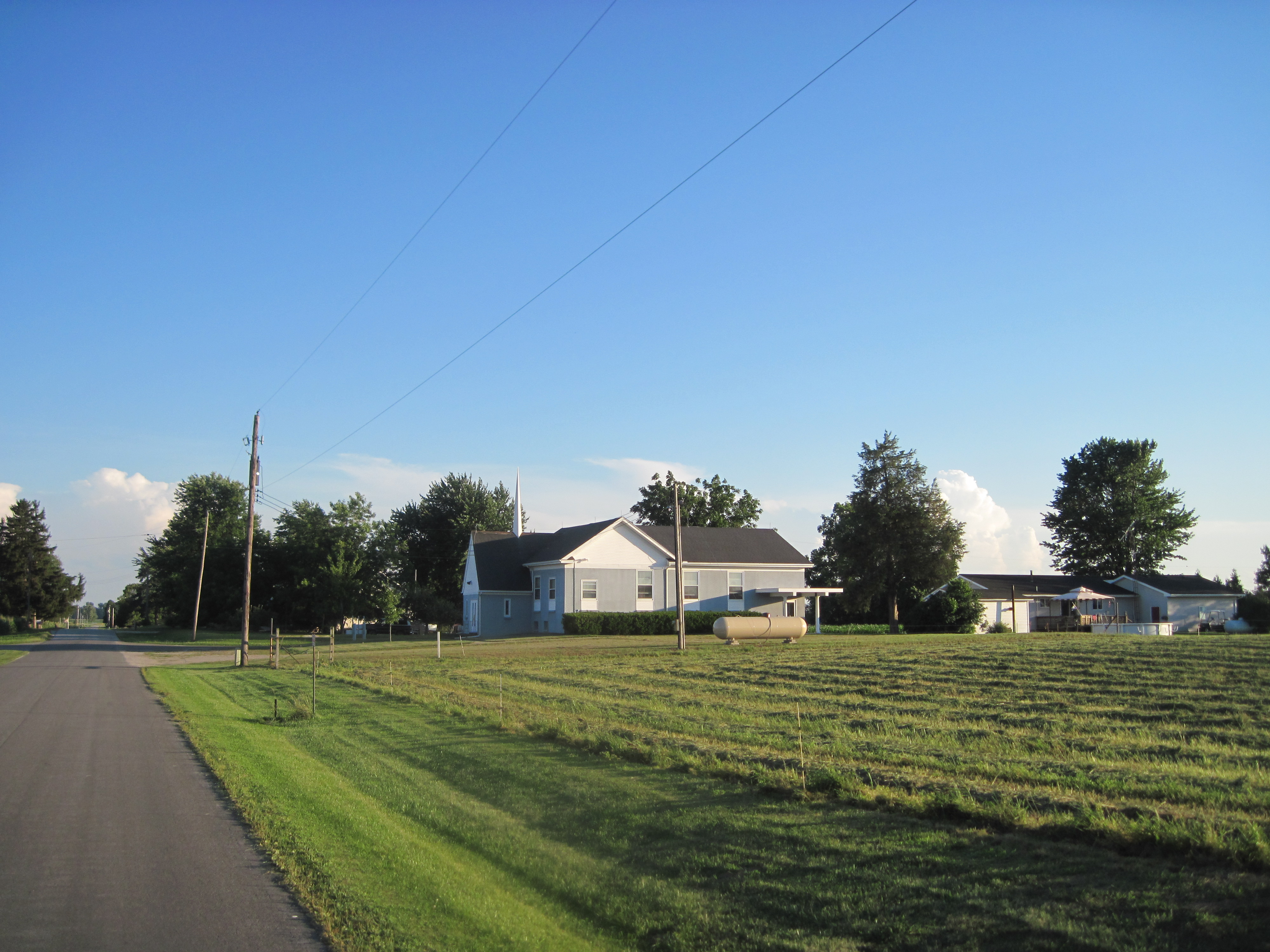
The Inlet Mennonite Church

Inlet is an unincorporated community in Fulton County, in the U.S. state of Ohio.

== History ==
A post office called Inlet was established in 1897, and remained in operation until 1903. In 1920, Inlet was one of three communities listed in Chesterfield Township.
