= Ai, Ohio =

Unincorporated community in Ohio, U.S.

Coordinates: 41°37′28″N 83°56′19″W

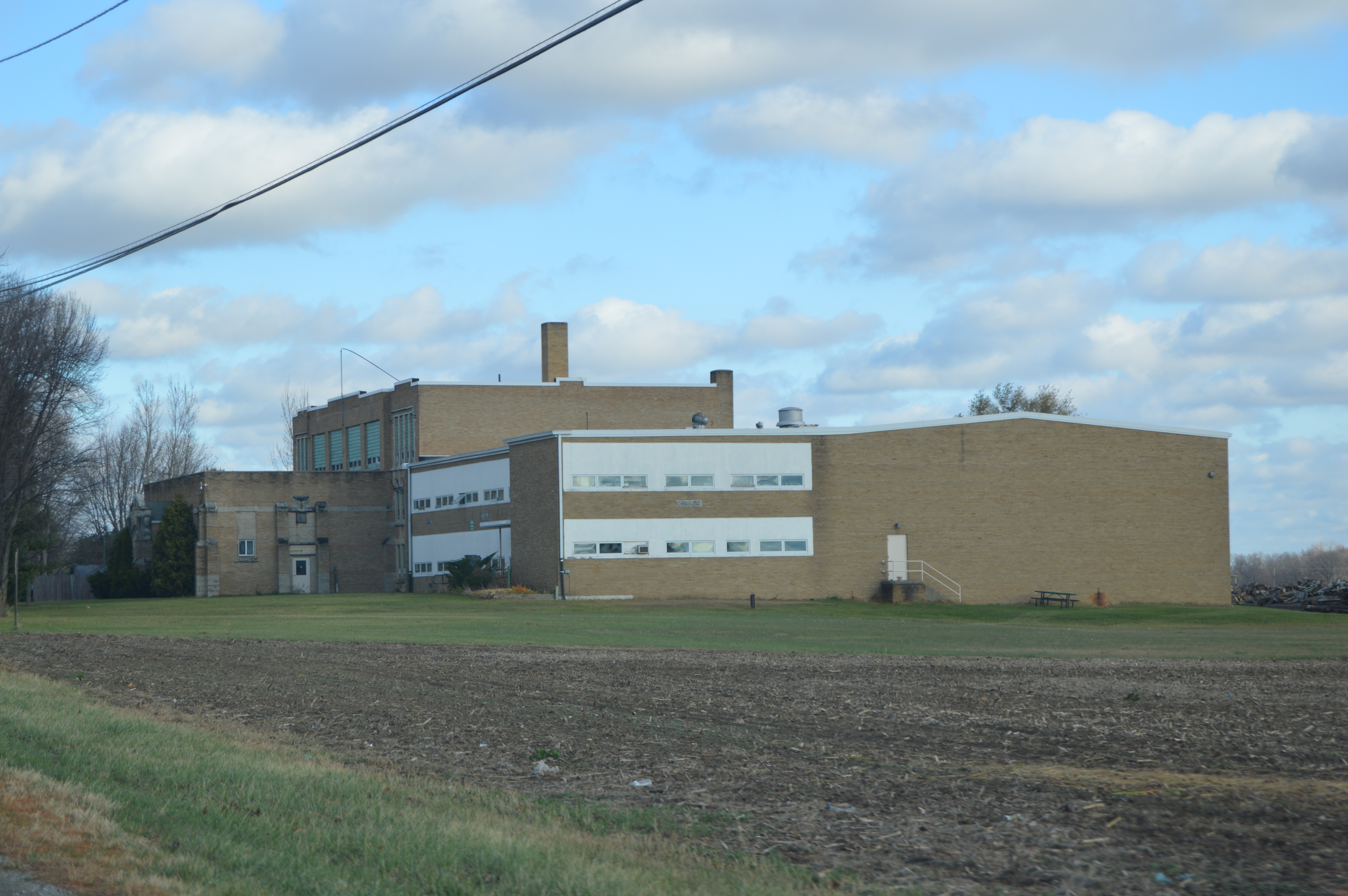
Fulton Elementary School

Ai is a census-designated place (CDP) in Fulton County, Ohio, United States. The population was 322 at the 2020 census. Ai has been noted for its short place name.

== History ==
Ai was established around 1843. A post office was established at Ai in 1846, and remained in operation until it was discontinued in 1903. With the construction of the Northern Indiana Air Line railroad during the 1850s, business activity shifted to nearby Swanton and Ai's population dwindled.

=== Name origin ===
The origin of the place's name has been a local controversy. Some say that it was named after the biblical city of Ai, while others believe that it was named after one of its founders, Ami Richards. The story continues Ami was a man, so others dropped the 'M' from his name to make the town's name more masculine.
