= Lyon Township =

Lyon Township may refer to:

== Iowa ==
- Lyon Township, Hamilton County, Iowa
- Lyon Township, Lyon County, Iowa

== Kansas ==
- Lyon Township, Cherokee County, Kansas
- Lyon Township, Cloud County, Kansas
- Lyon Township, Decatur County, Kansas
- Lyon Township, Dickinson County, Kansas
- Lyon Township, Geary County, Kansas

== Michigan ==
- Lyon Township, Oakland County, Michigan
- Lyon Township, Roscommon County, Michigan

== Missouri ==
- Lyon Township, Franklin County, Missouri
- Lyon Township, Knox County, Missouri
- Lyon Township, Lewis County, Missouri

== North Dakota ==
- Lyon Township, Stutsman County, North Dakota, in Stutsman County, North Dakota

== South Dakota ==
- Lyon Township, South Dakota, in Brule County, South Dakota

== See also ==
- Lyons Township (disambiguation)
