= Justice Lyon =

Justice Lyon may refer to:

- Richard F. Lyon (judge) (1819–1894), associate justice of the Supreme Court of Georgia
- William P. Lyon (1822–1913), associate justice and chief justice of the Supreme Court of Wisconsin

== See also ==
- Justice Lyons (disambiguation)
