= Lyon's =

Former American restaurant chain

Lyon's Restaurant
- Type: Private
- Industry: Restaurants
- Founded: 1952; 74 years ago in San Francisco, California, U.S.
- Defunct: 2012; 14 years ago
- Headquarters: Sacramento, California, U.S.

Lyon's Restaurant was a chain of diner-style restaurants. Many Lyon's were in Northern California, with their corporate headquarters in Sacramento.

== History ==
Lyon's was founded in San Francisco in about 1952 by Lyons Magnus which was a wholesaler of syrups at the time. In 1966, it was bought by Consolidated Foods Corporation which later became Sara Lee; the company sold the chain in a management buyout (MBO) in 1989. At the time of the MBO, Lyon's had 65 restaurants across California, Oregon and Nevada and a turnover of $100m.

Not all of their restaurants were in Northern California. Around 1968, there was at least one in Southern California, in La Habra's Fashion Square. The location is now a Denny's Diner and sits near the northeast corner of South Beach Boulevard & West Imperial Highway. The exterior of the building is almost unchanged (other than being painted a different color). It was a Honey's Diner location until the late 1990s or early 2000s. Another Lyon's was photographed in Eugene, Oregon, in 1985. This site became a Chinese buffet restaurant catering to faculty and students at the University of Oregon.

After bankruptcy in February 1998, Lyon's was acquired by ICH, an Arby's franchisee. In January 2001, ICH sold Lyon's to Amber's Pacific Restaurants Inc., a company of San Diego restaurant owner Amber Lao. APRI filed for Chapter 11 bankruptcy in October 2001, blaming the economic downturn at that time.

In 2002, Lyon's reorganized its 72 remaining restaurants. It sold 35 to franchisees, closed 32, and kept five in Northern California.

The last Lyon's closed in Sacramento in March 2012.
