= Royalton Township, Fulton County, Ohio =

Township in Ohio, US

- Township
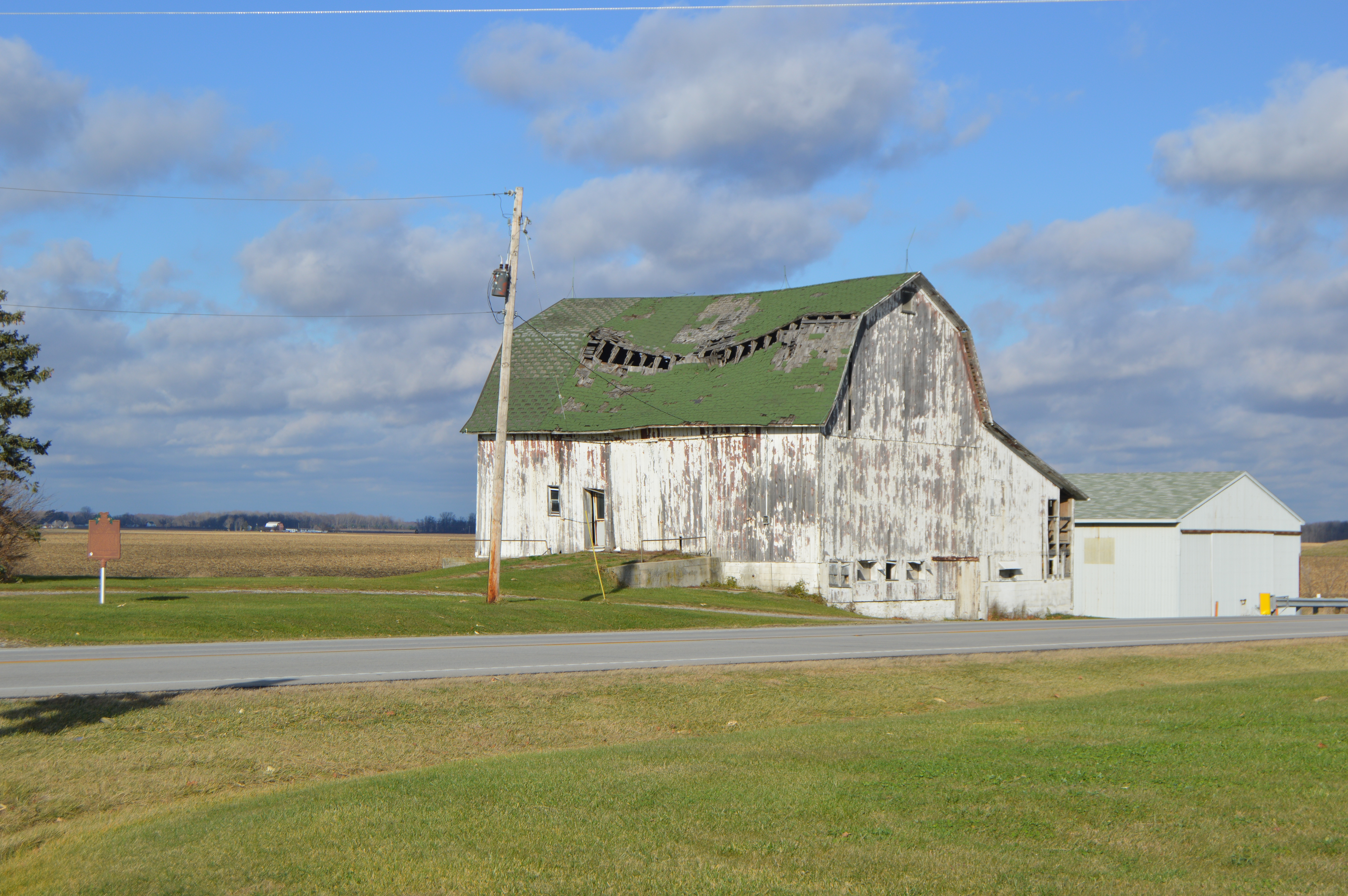
- Site of the Battle of Phillips Corners during the Toledo War

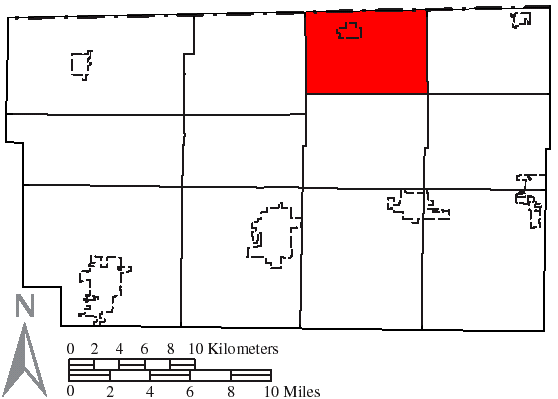
- Location of Royalton Township in Fulton County
- Coordinates: 41°41′15″N 84°2′46″W
- Country: United States
- State: Ohio
- County: Fulton

Area
  - Total: 24.6 sq mi (63.8 km^{2})
  - Land: 24.5 sq mi (63.5 km^{2})
  - Water: 0.12 sq mi (0.3 km^{2})
- Elevation: 758 ft (231 m)

Population (2020)
  - Total: 1,515
  - Density: 61.8/sq mi (23.9/km^{2})
- Time zone: UTC-5 (Eastern (EST))
  - Summer (DST): UTC-4 (EDT)
- FIPS code: 39-68896
- GNIS feature ID: 1086129

Royalton Township is one of the twelve townships of Fulton County, Ohio, United States. As of the 2020 census the population was 1,515.

== Geography ==
Located in the northern part of the county along the Michigan line, it borders the following townships:

- Fairfield Township, Lenawee County, Michigan - north
- Ogden Township, Lenawee County, Michigan - northeast corner
- Amboy Township - east
- Fulton Township - southeast corner
- Pike Township - south
- Chesterfield Township - west
- Seneca Township, Lenawee County, Michigan - northwest corner

The village of Lyons is located in northern Royalton Township.

== Name and history ==
It is the only Royalton Township statewide.

== Government ==
The township is governed by a three-member board of trustees, who are elected in November of odd-numbered years to a four-year term beginning on the following January 1. Two are elected in the year after the presidential election and one is elected in the year before it. There is also an elected township fiscal officer, who serves a four-year term beginning on April 1 of the year after the election, which is held in November of the year before the presidential election. Vacancies in the fiscal officership or on the board of trustees are filled by the remaining trustees.
