= Lyons, Ohio =

- Village
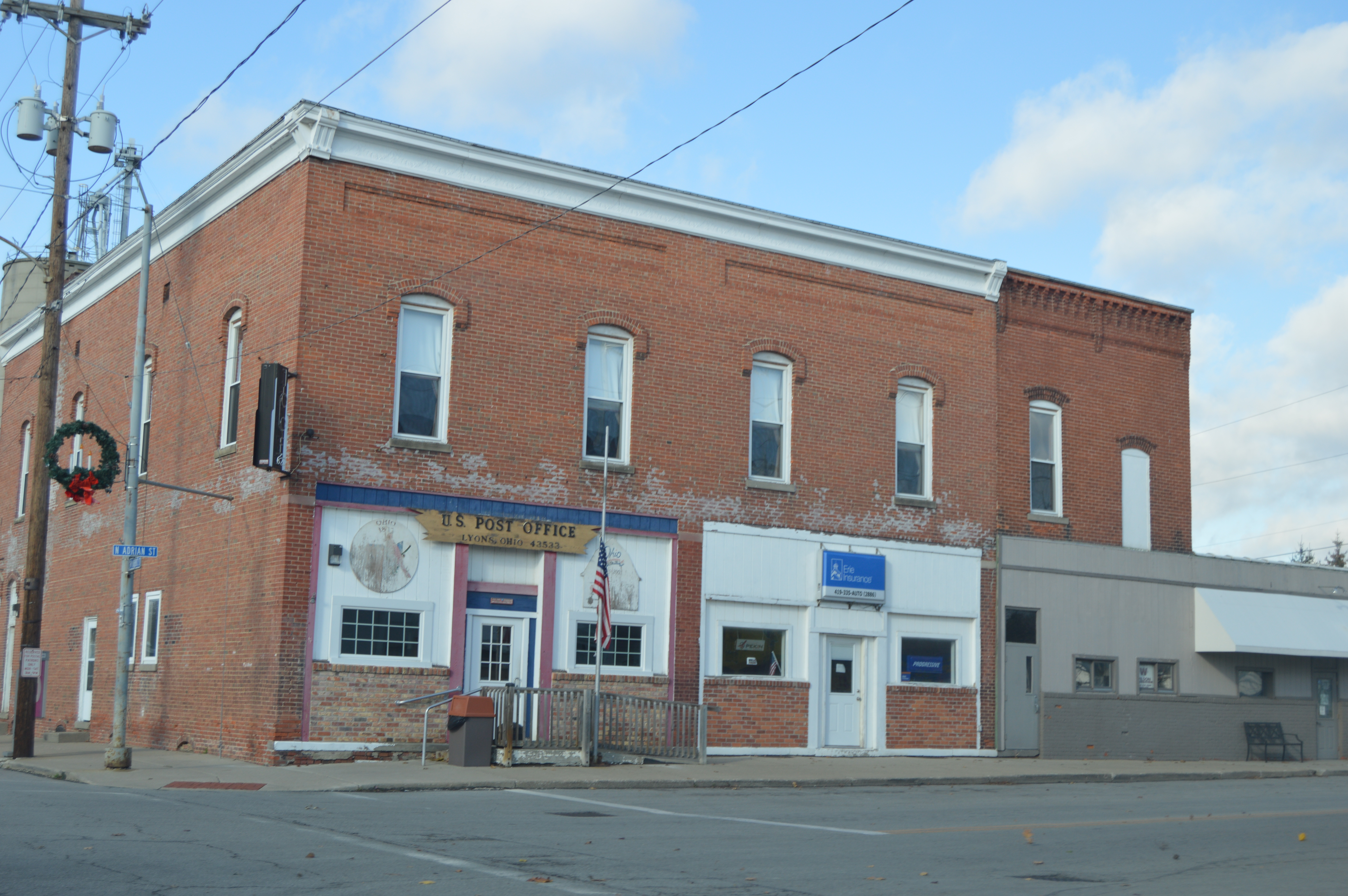
- Adrian Street downtown

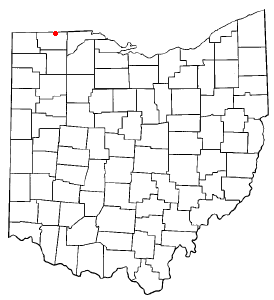
- Location of Lyons, Ohio

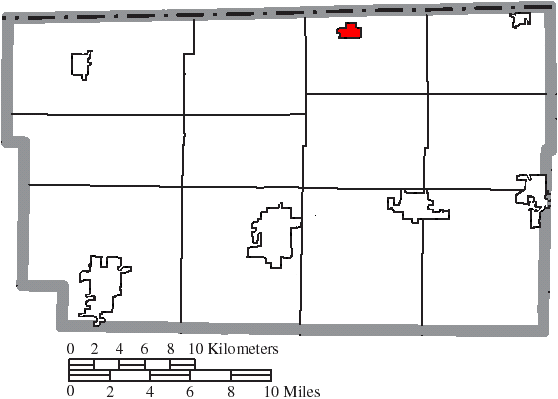
- Location of Lyons in Fulton County
- Coordinates: 41°42′01″N 84°04′18″W
- Country: United States
- State: Ohio
- County: Fulton
- Township: Royalton

Area
  - Total: 0.71 sq mi (1.83 km^{2})
  - Land: 0.71 sq mi (1.83 km^{2})
  - Water: 0 sq mi (0.00 km^{2})
- Elevation: 768 ft (234 m)

Population (2020)
  - Total: 602
  - Density: 850.9/sq mi (328.52/km^{2})
- Time zone: UTC-5 (Eastern (EST))
  - Summer (DST): UTC-4 (EDT)
- ZIP code: 43533
- Area code: 419
- FIPS code: 39-45626
- GNIS feature ID: 2399211
- Website: https://www.lyons-ohio.com/

Lyons (/ˈlaɪənz/ LY-ənz) is a village in Fulton County, Ohio, United States. The population was 602 at the 2020 census.

== History ==
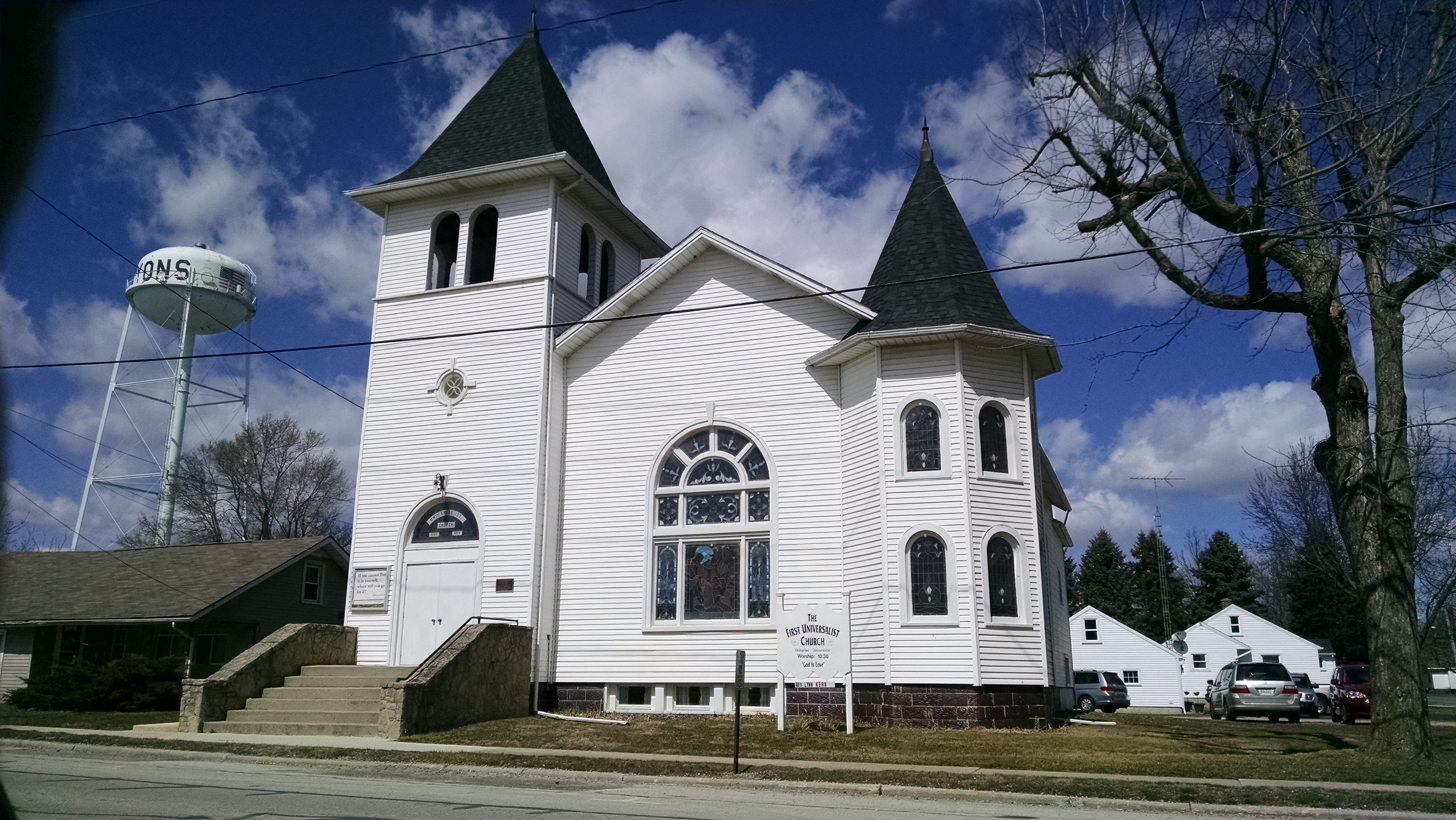
First Universalist Church of Lyons, built 1868

A post office called Lyons has been in operation since 1837. Lyons was also called "Morey's Corners", and under the latter name the village had its start in 1850 when a plank road was completed to that point. The village was named "Morey's Corners" in honor of it founder Jinks Morey, who also founded what became First Universalist Church of Lyons, Ohio, now the oldest non-residential structure in Royalton Township, Fulton County, Ohio. The village was incorporated in 1900.

== Geography ==
According to the United States Census Bureau, the village has a total area of 0.71 square miles (1.84 km^{2}), all land.

== Demographics ==
Historical population
Census	Pop.	Note	%±
1880	219		—
1910	408		—
1920	329		−19.4%
1930	390		18.5%
1940	464		19.0%
1950	511		10.1%
1960	590		15.5%
1970	630		6.8%
1980	596		−5.4%
1990	579		−2.9%
2000	559		−3.5%
2010	562		0.5%
2020	602		7.1%
U.S. Decennial Census

=== 2010 census ===
As of the census of 2010, there were 562 people, 227 households, and 148 families living in the village. The population density was 791.5 inhabitants per square mile (305.6/km^{2}). There were 249 housing units at an average density of 350.7 per square mile (135.4/km^{2}). The racial makeup of the village was 97.9% White, 0.2% African American, 0.4% Asian, 0.4% from other races, and 1.2% from two or more races. Hispanic or Latino of any race were 3.0% of the population.

There were 227 households, of which 32.6% had children under the age of 18 living with them, 49.8% were married couples living together, 8.4% had a female householder with no husband present, 7.0% had a male householder with no wife present, and 34.8% were non-families. 30.8% of all households were made up of individuals, and 14.9% had someone living alone who was 65 years of age or older. The average household size was 2.48 and the average family size was 3.07.

The median age in the village was 39.5 years. 24.9% of residents were under the age of 18; 7.5% were between the ages of 18 and 24; 25.3% were from 25 to 44; 29.9% were from 45 to 64; and 12.5% were 65 years of age or older. The gender makeup of the village was 48.8% male and 51.2% female.

=== 2000 census ===
As of the census of 2000, there were 559 people, 220 households, and 150 families living in the village. The population density was 789.5 inhabitants per square mile (304.8/km^{2}). There were 230 housing units at an average density of 324.8 per square mile (125.4/km^{2}). The racial makeup of the village was 95.71% White, 0.18% Native American, 2.15% from other races, and 1.97% from two or more races. Hispanic or Latino of any race were 3.94% of the population.

There were 220 households, out of which 33.2% had children under the age of 18 living with them, 56.4% were married couples living together, 7.3% had a female householder with no husband present, and 31.4% were non-families. 29.5% of all households were made up of individuals, and 13.2% had someone living alone who was 65 years of age or older. The average household size was 2.54 and the average family size was 3.17.

In the village, the population was spread out, with 28.1% under the age of 18, 7.7% from 18 to 24, 30.8% from 25 to 44, 17.9% from 45 to 64, and 15.6% who were 65 years of age or older. The median age was 34 years. For every 100 females there were 96.1 males. For every 100 females age 18 and over, there were 94.2 males.

The median income for a household in the village was $41,346, and the median income for a family was $46,417. Males had a median income of $37,000 versus $20,625 for females. The per capita income for the village was $17,186. About 3.5% of families and 5.6% of the population were below the poverty line, including 7.1% of those under age 18 and 10.6% of those age 65 or over.
