= Lyons Township, Wadena County, Minnesota =

Lyons Township, Minnesota
- Township
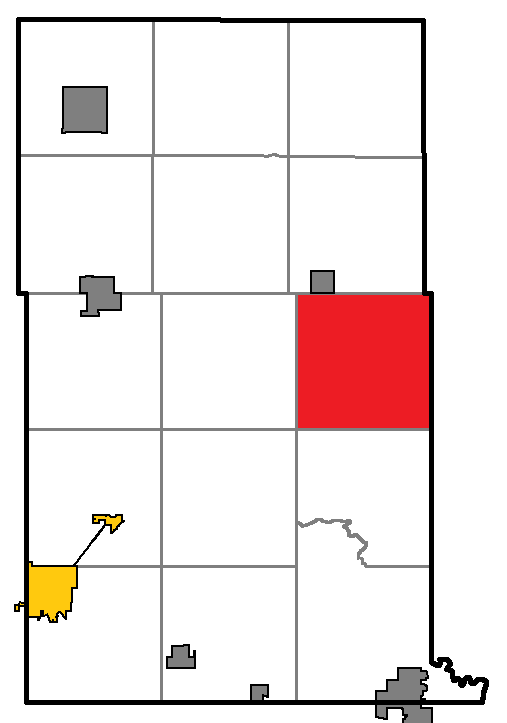
- Location of Lyons Township, within Wadena County, Minnesota
- Coordinates: 46°35′17″N 94°49′52″W
- Country: United States
- State: Minnesota
- County: Wadena

Area
  - Total: 35.6 sq mi (92.3 km^{2})
  - Land: 34.9 sq mi (90.4 km^{2})
  - Water: 0.73 sq mi (1.9 km^{2})
- Elevation: 1,322 ft (403 m)

Population (2020)
  - Total: 186
  - Density: 5.33/sq mi (2.06/km^{2})
- Time zone: UTC-6 (Central (CST))
  - Summer (DST): UTC-5 (CDT)
- FIPS code: 27-38852
- GNIS feature ID: 0664850

Lyons Township is a township in Wadena County, Minnesota, United States. The population was 186 at the 2020 census.

== History ==
Lyons Township was named for Harrison Lyons, a county official.

== Geography ==
According to the United States Census Bureau, the township has a total area of 35.6 square miles (92.3 km^{2}); 34.9 square miles (90.4 km^{2}) of it is land and 0.7 square miles (1.9 km^{2}) of it (2.08%) is water.

== Demographics ==
As of the census of 2000, there were 180 people, 78 households, and 52 families residing in the township. The population density was 5.2 inhabitants per square mile (2.0/km^{2}). There were 121 housing units at an average density of 3.5 per square mile (1.4/km^{2}). The racial makeup of the township was 92.78% White, 0.56% African American, 3.33% Native American, and 3.33% from two or more races. Hispanic or Latino of any race were 1.11% of the population.

There were 78 households, out of which 20.5% had children under the age of 18 living with them, 62.8% were married couples living together, and 32.1% were non-families. 25.6% of all households were made up of individuals, and 15.4% had someone living alone who was 65 years of age or older. The average household size was 2.31 and the average family size was 2.81.

In the township the population was spread out, with 17.8% under the age of 18, 7.2% from 18 to 24, 21.1% from 25 to 44, 36.7% from 45 to 64, and 17.2% who were 65 years of age or older. The median age was 47 years. For every 100 females, there were 127.8 males. For every 100 females age 18 and over, there were 120.9 males.

The median income for a household in the township was $35,000, and the median income for a family was $32,250. Males had a median income of $36,875 versus $14,750 for females. The per capita income for the township was $20,031. About 25.6% of families and 24.7% of the population were below the poverty line, including 57.1% of those under the age of eighteen and 16.7% of those 65 or over.
