= Edward D. Libbey House =

Historic house in Ohio, United States

- U.S. National Register of Historic Places
- U.S. National Historic Landmark
- U.S. Historic district – Contributing property
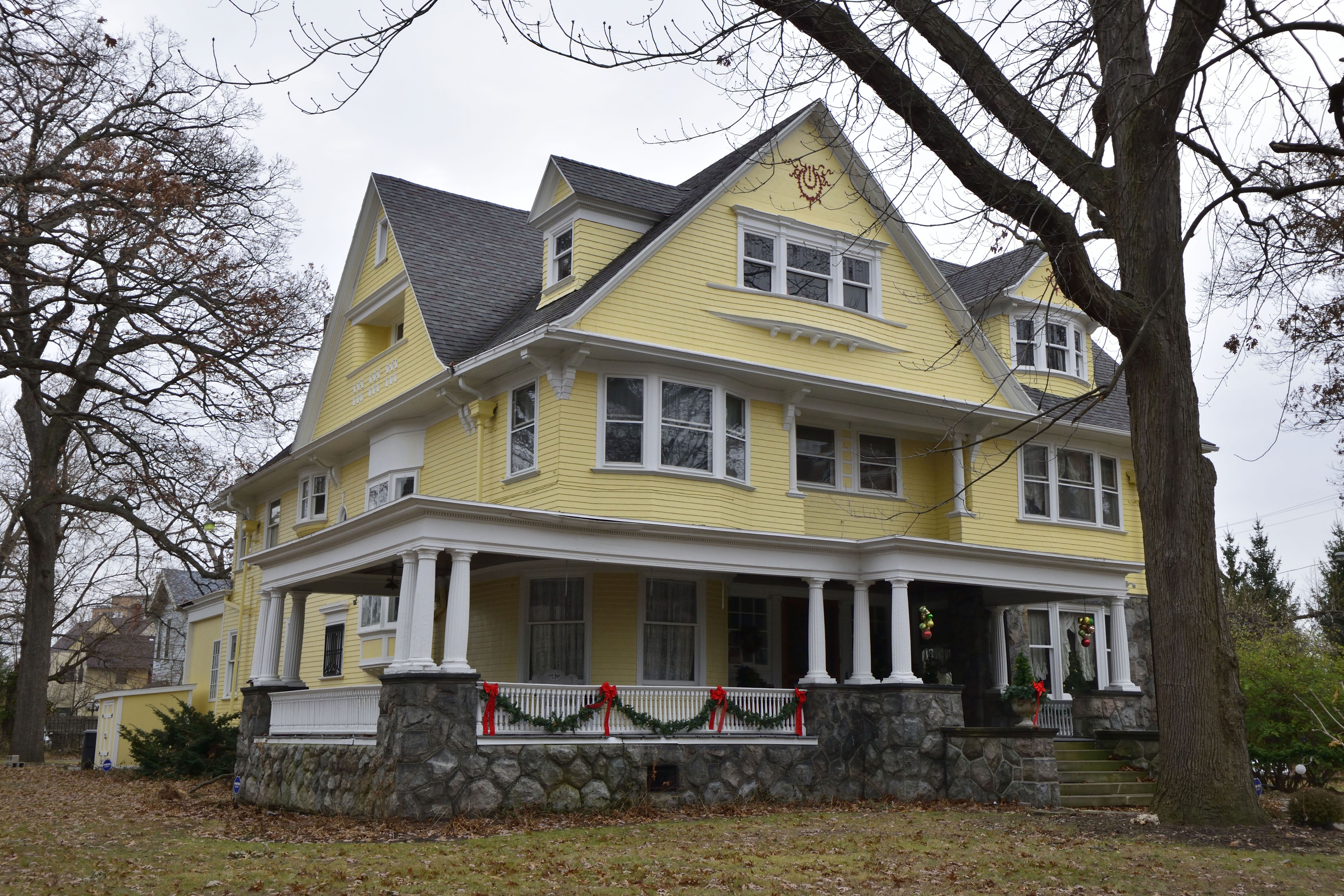

- Location within Ohio Location within the United States
- Location: 2008 Scottwood Ave., Toledo, Ohio
- Coordinates: 41°39′38″N 83°33′31″W
- Area: less than one acre
- Built: 1895
- Architect: David L. Stine
- Architectural style: Shingle Style
- Website: http://libbeyhouse.org/
- Part of: Old West End District (ID73001503)
- NRHP reference No.: 83004379

Significant dates
- Added to NRHP: May 4, 1983
- Designated NHL: May 4, 1983
- Designated CP: March 14, 1973

The Edward D. Libbey House is a historic house museum at 2008 Scottwood Avenue in Toledo, Ohio. Built in 1895, it was the home of Edward Libbey (1854-1925), a businessman who revolutionized the glass making industry in the United States. Libbey and his wife, Florence Scott Libbey would later establish the Toledo Museum of Art in 1901.

It was declared a National Historic Landmark in 1983. The property was purchased in 2008 by The Libbey House Foundation with the intent to restore the house to its original condition

== Description and history ==
The Edward D. Libbey House is located in the Old West End District, at the corner of Scottwood Avenue and Woodruff Avenue. It is a Shingle style home designed by architect David L. Stine and built in 1895. It is 2 1/2 stories in height, with a foundation of fieldstone and brick, and a shingled exterior. It has asymmetrical massing typical of the style, with gables of varying size, projecting and recessed sections, and a porch supported by clusters of Tuscan columns.

Edward Libbey, a native of Massachusetts, was trained in the manufacture of glass at the New England Glass Company, and came to Toledo in 1888, where he established a new glass works with former employees of that firm. Working with inventor Michael Joseph Owens, Libbey proceeded to revolutionize the manufacture of glass, creating automated equipment for producing all manner of glass products, including light bulbs, bottles, glass tubing, and window glass. He eventually founded several different firms in support of these and other innovations.

Libbey owned the house until his death in 1925; it is the only significant surviving architectural artifact associated with his life. It remained a private residence until 1965, when it was purchased by the Toledo Society for the Handicapped. It is now owned and operated by a dedicated non-profit charity.

== Gallery ==
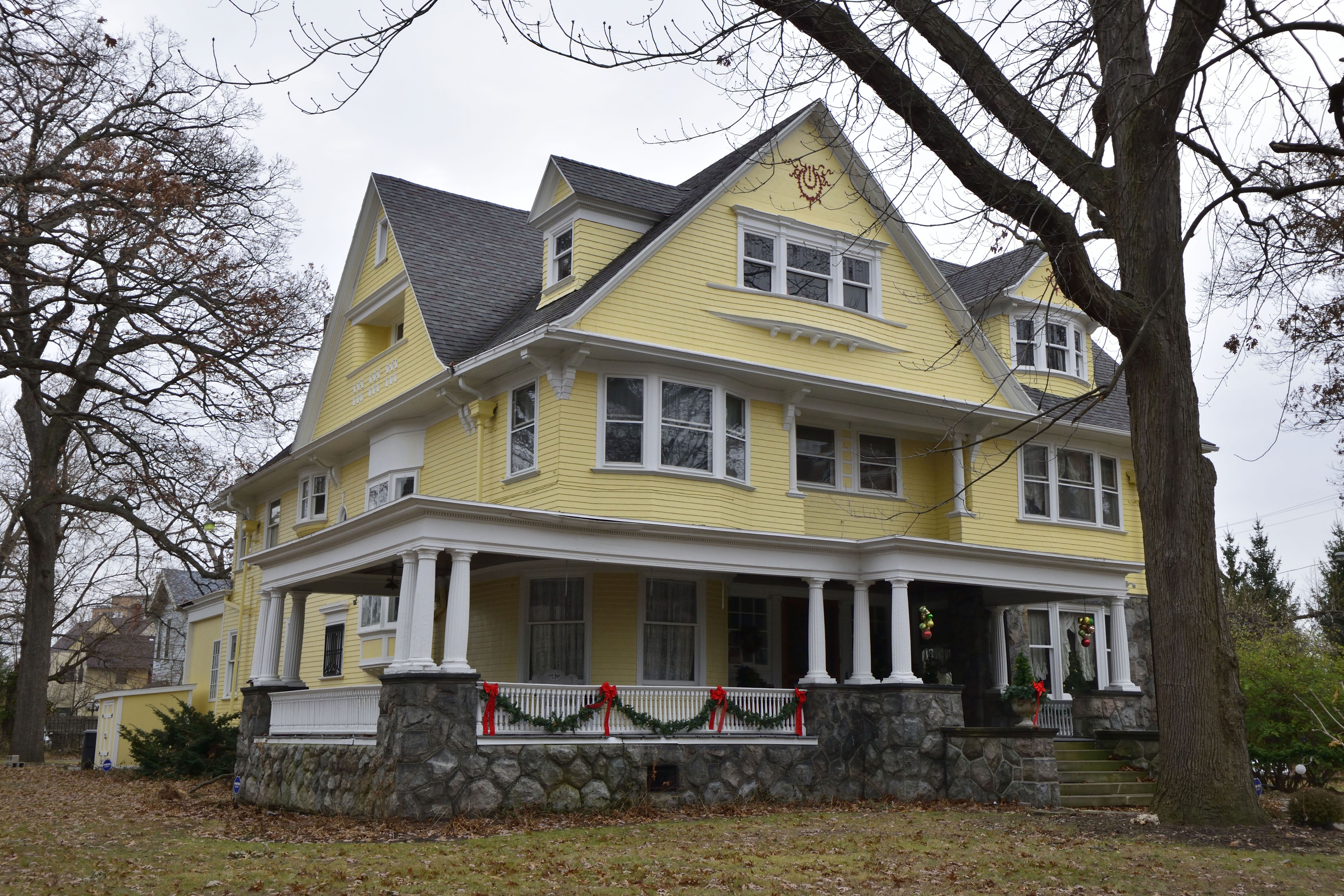
Exterior of Libbey House, 2018

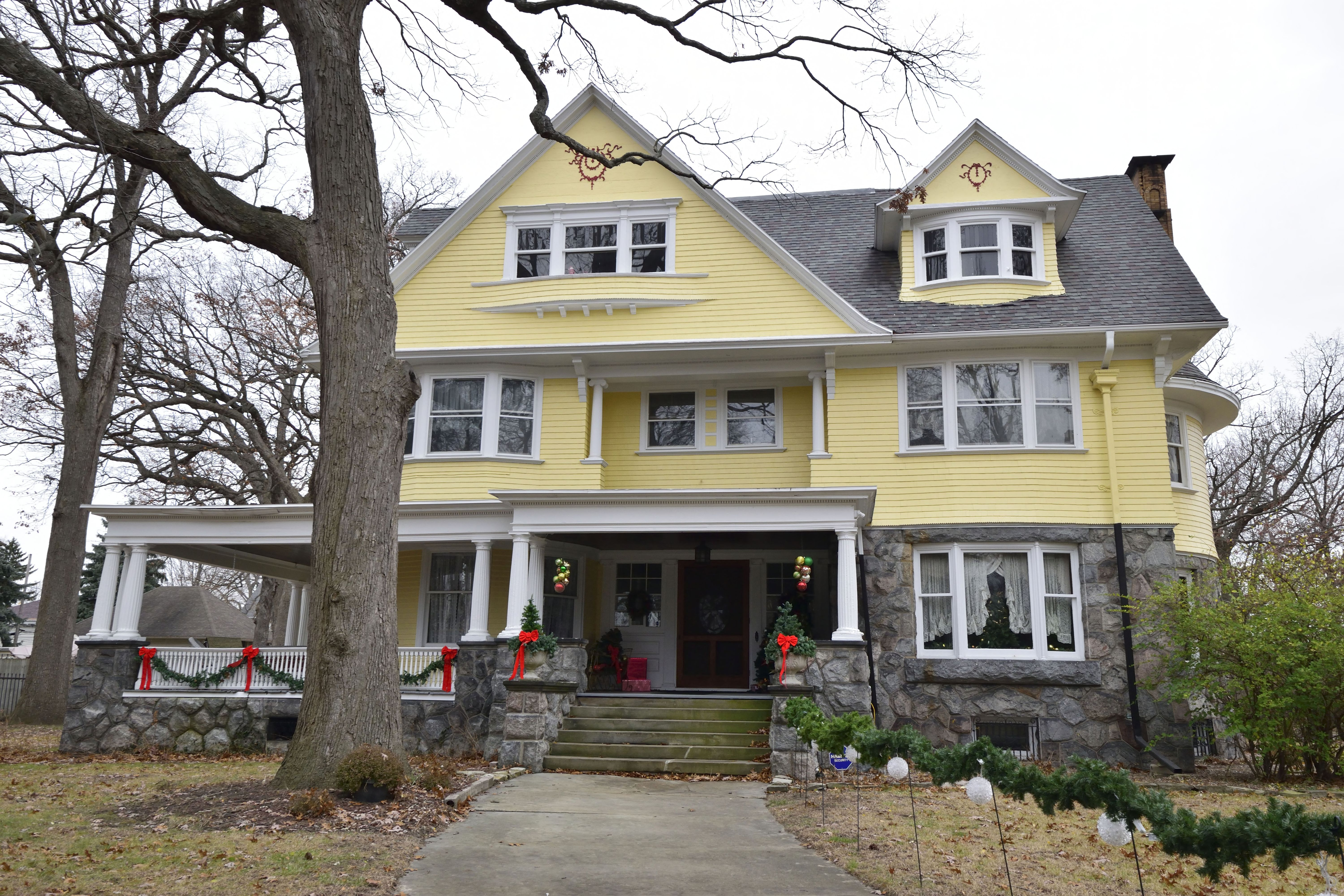
Exterior of Libbey House, 2018

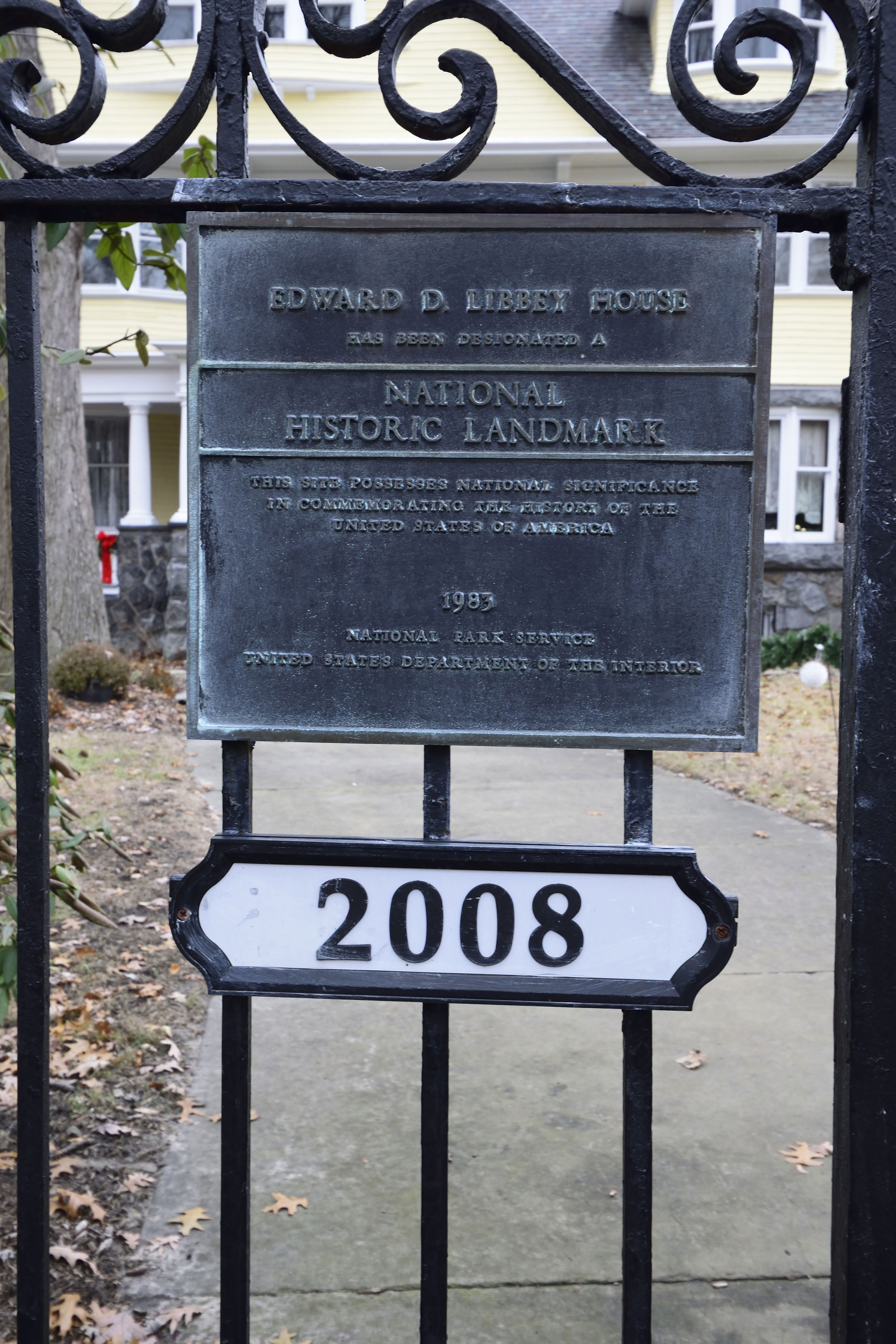
Historical marker outside of Libbey House, 2018

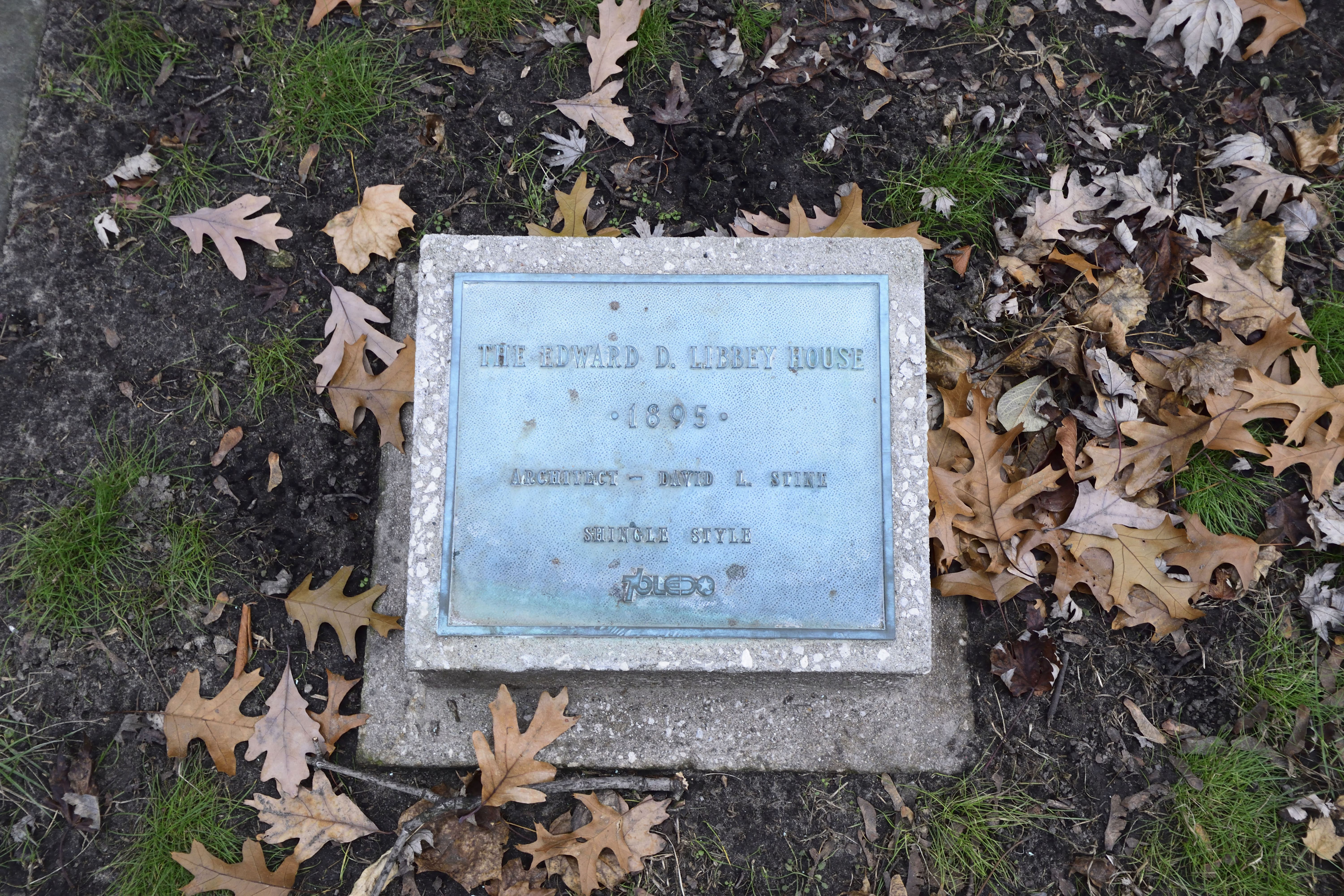
Historical marker outside of Libbey House, 2018

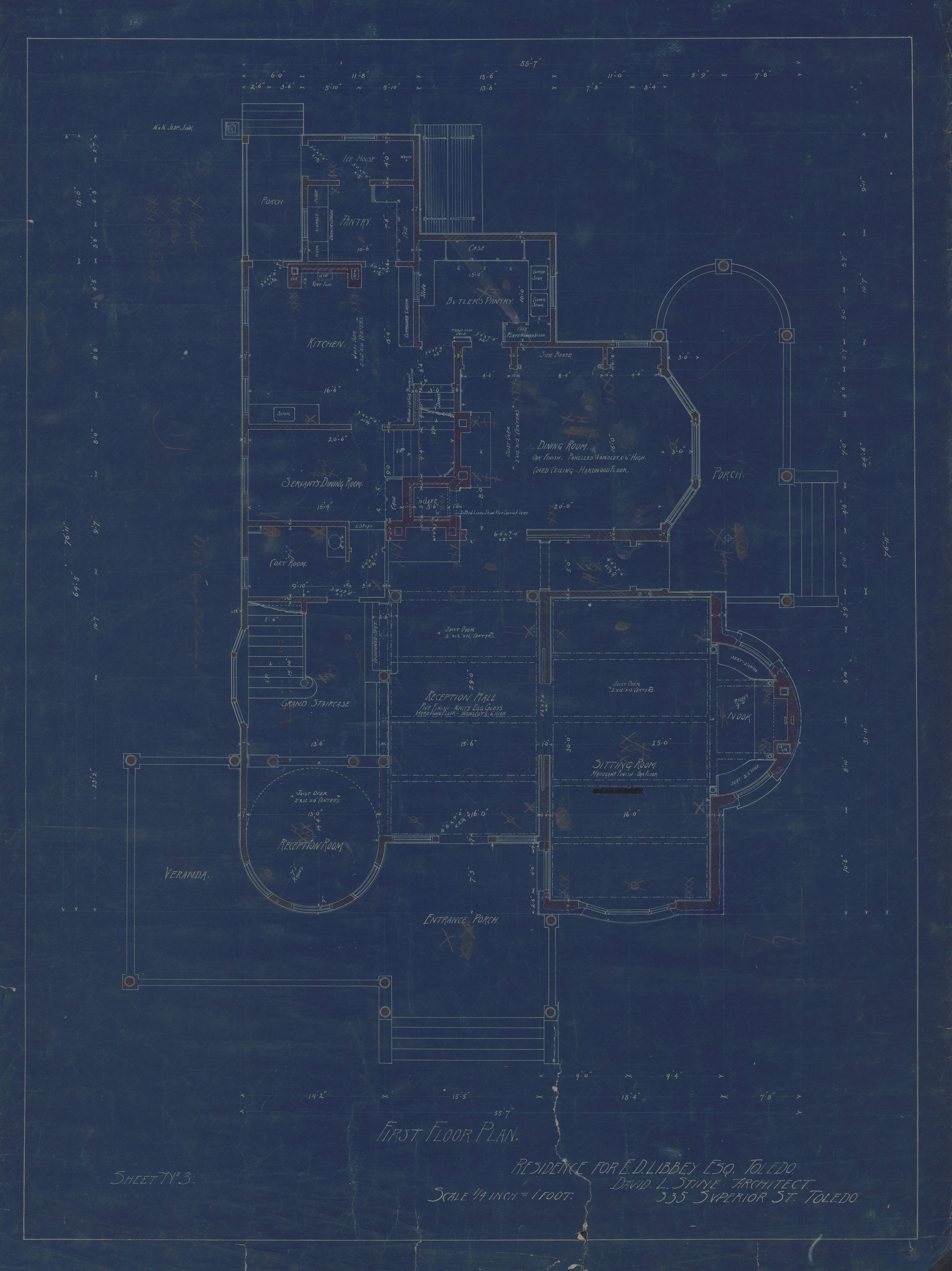
Blueprint of Libbey House detailing first floorplan, 1895

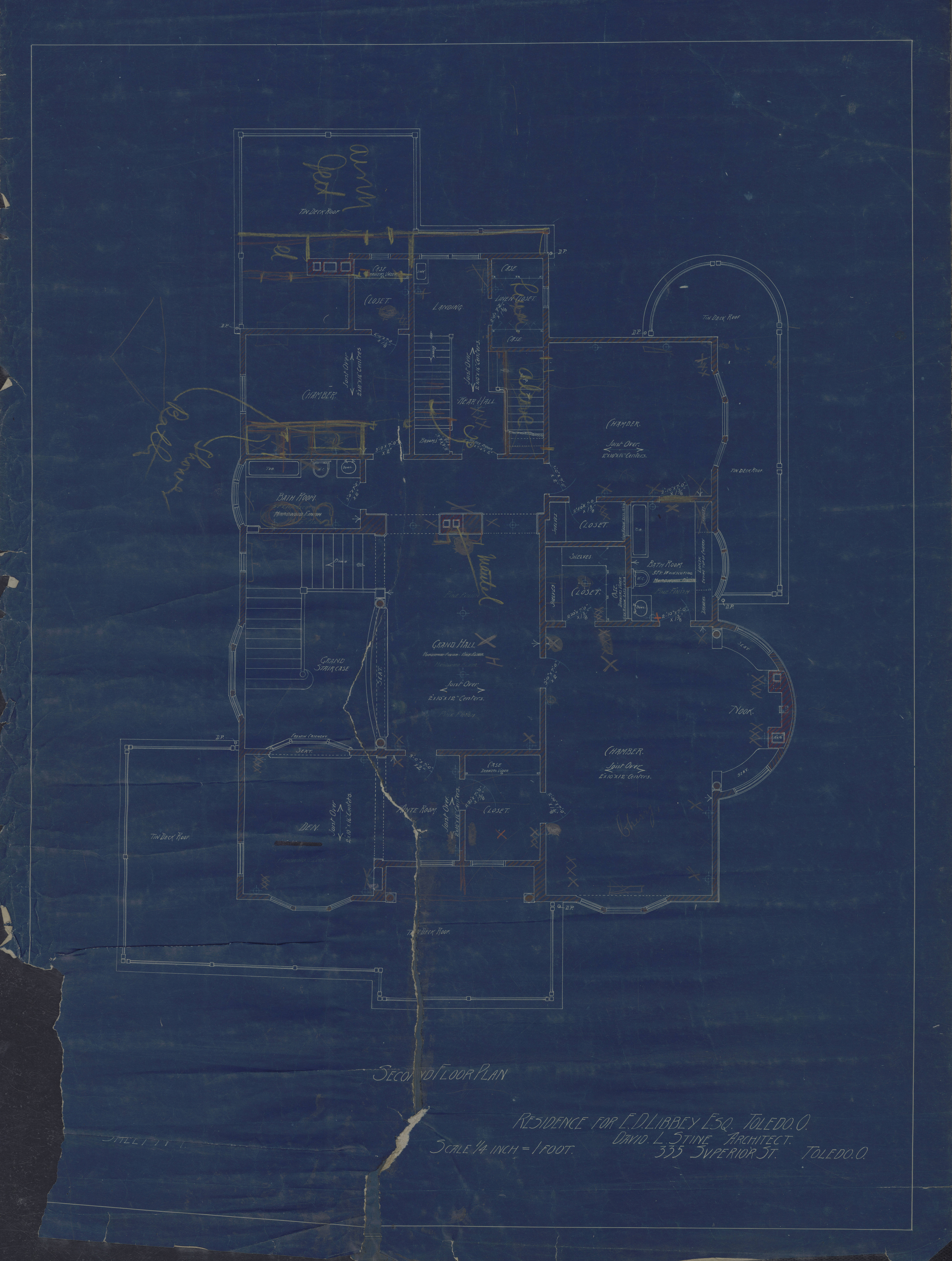
Blueprint of Libbey House detailing second floorplan, 1895

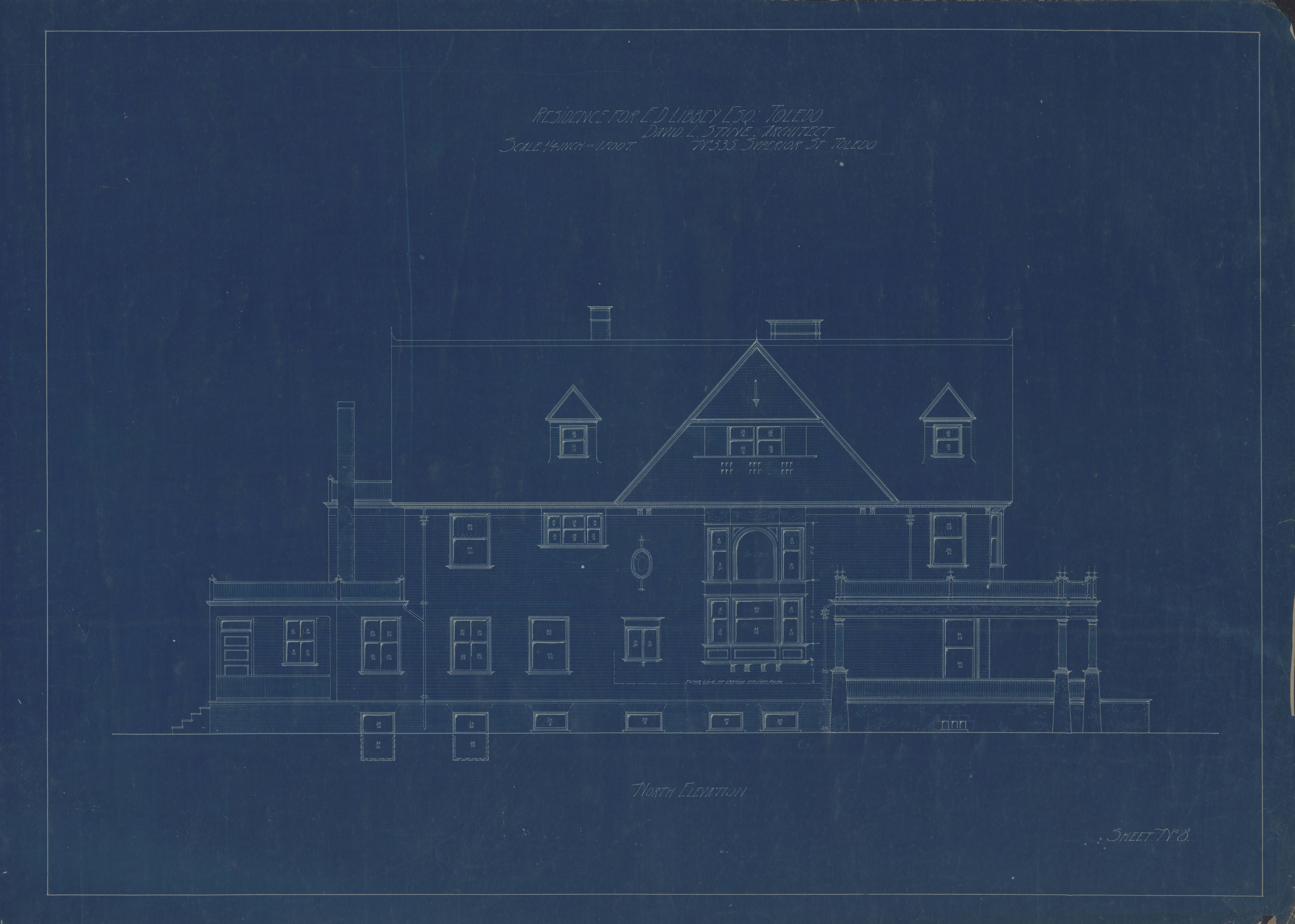
Blueprint of Libbey House detailing north exterior elevation, 1895

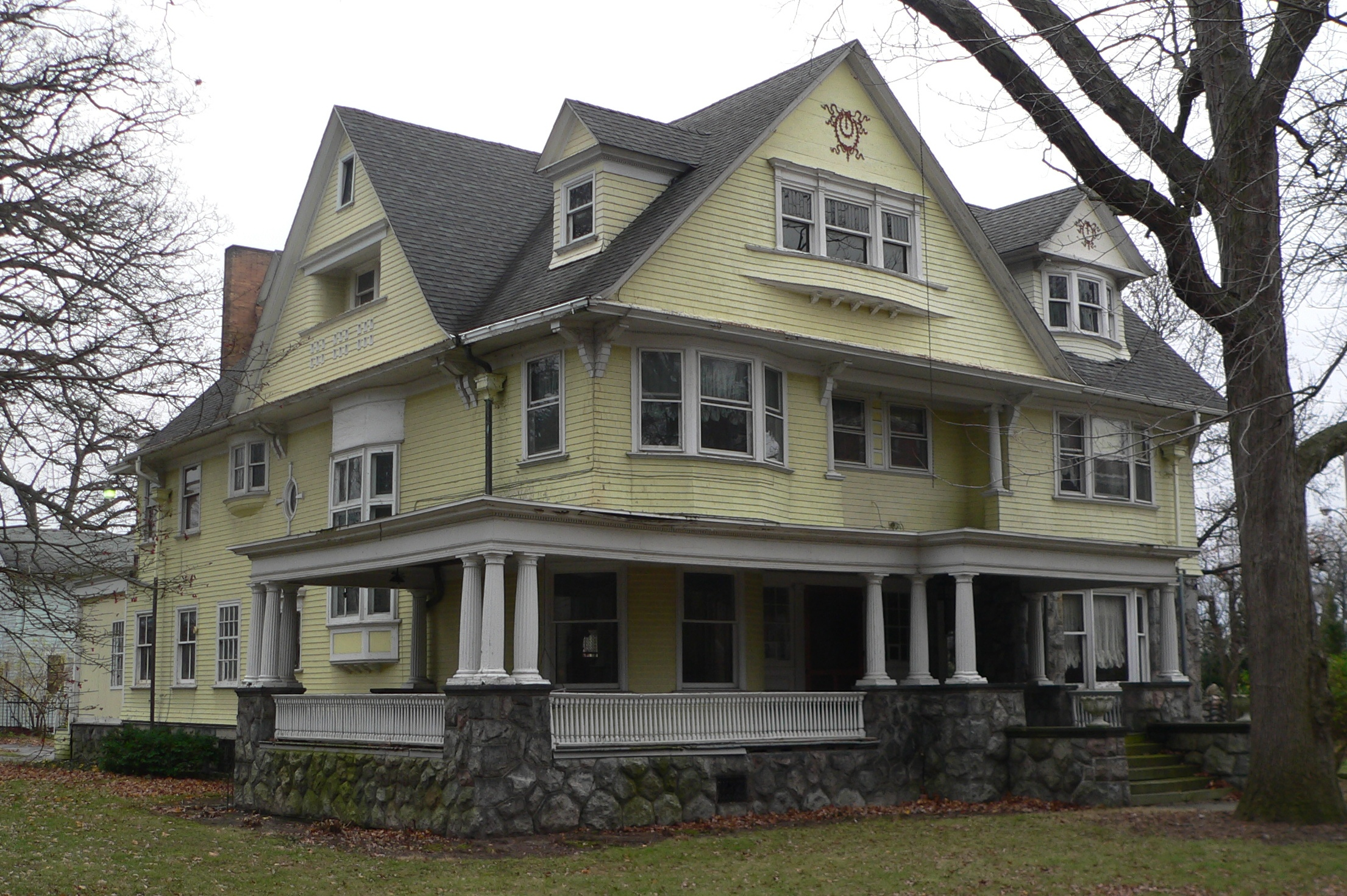
The Libbey House in 2011 prior to renovations done by the Libbey House Foundation

== See also ==
- List of National Historic Landmarks in Ohio
- National Register of Historic Places listings in Lucas County, Ohio
