= David L. Stine =

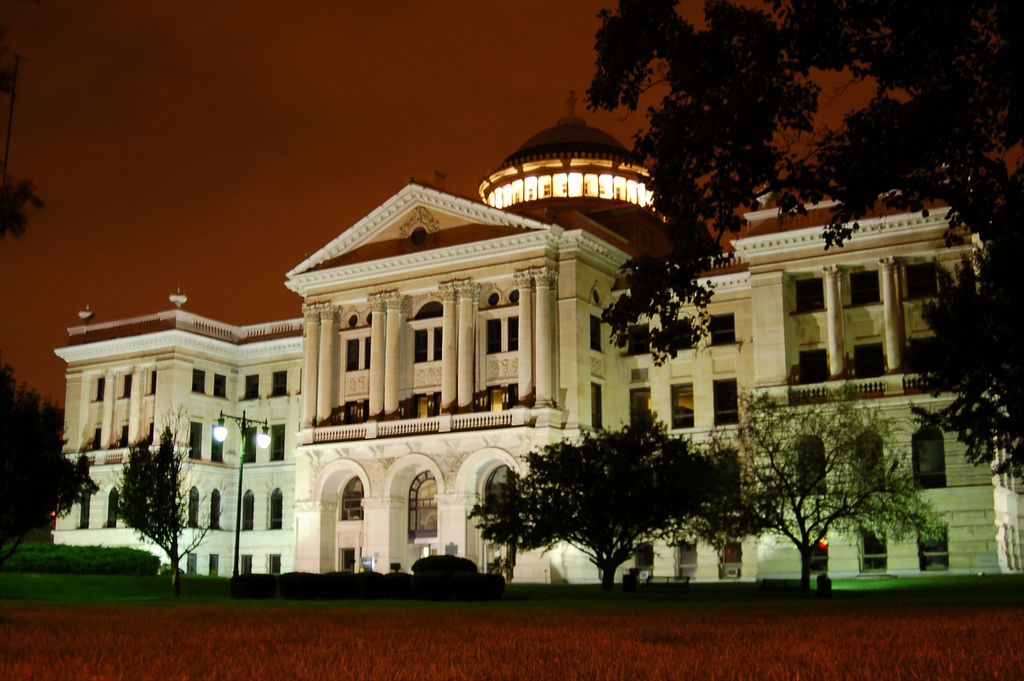
Lucas County Courthouse and Jail (1897)

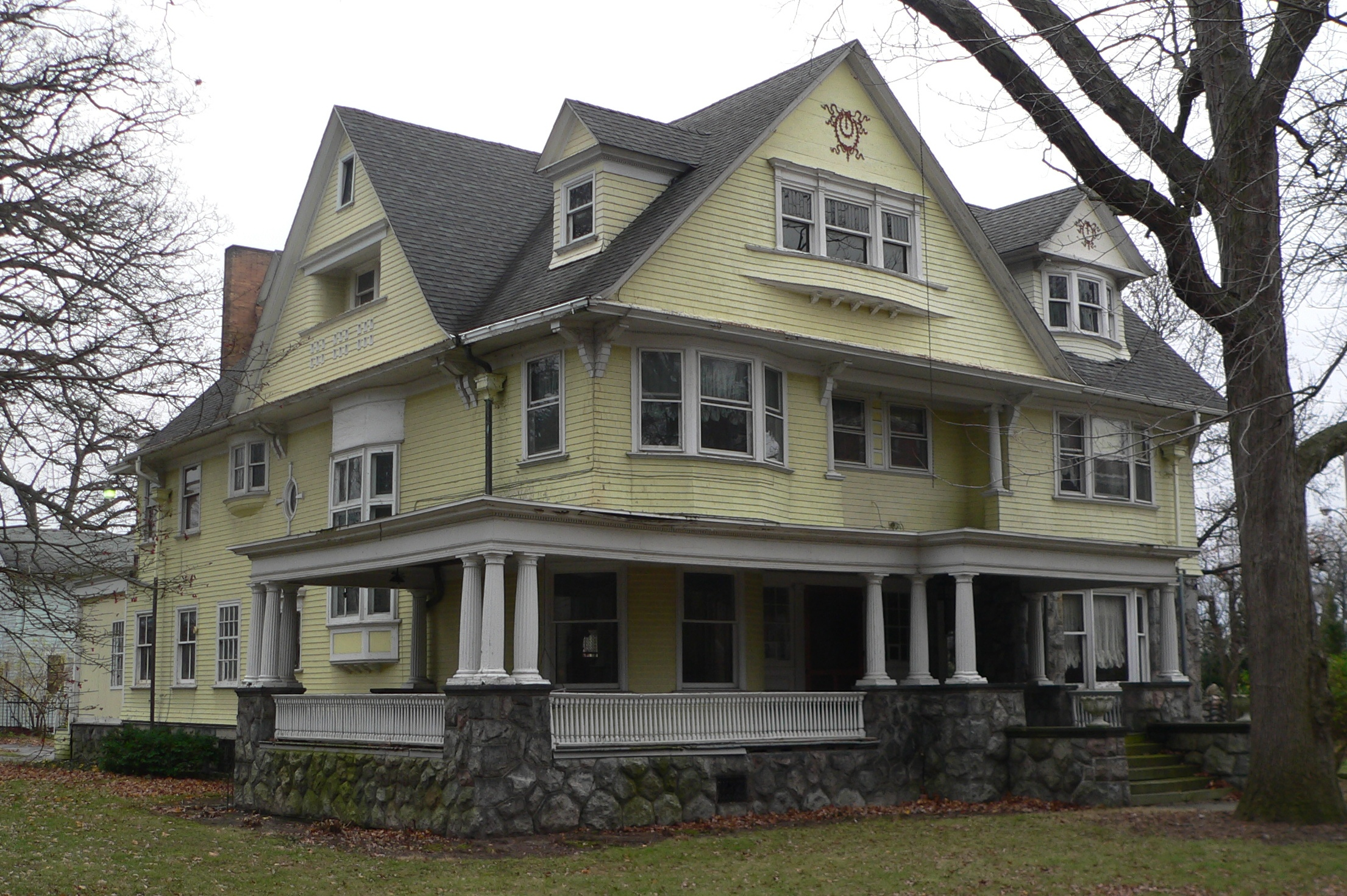
Edward D. Libbey house

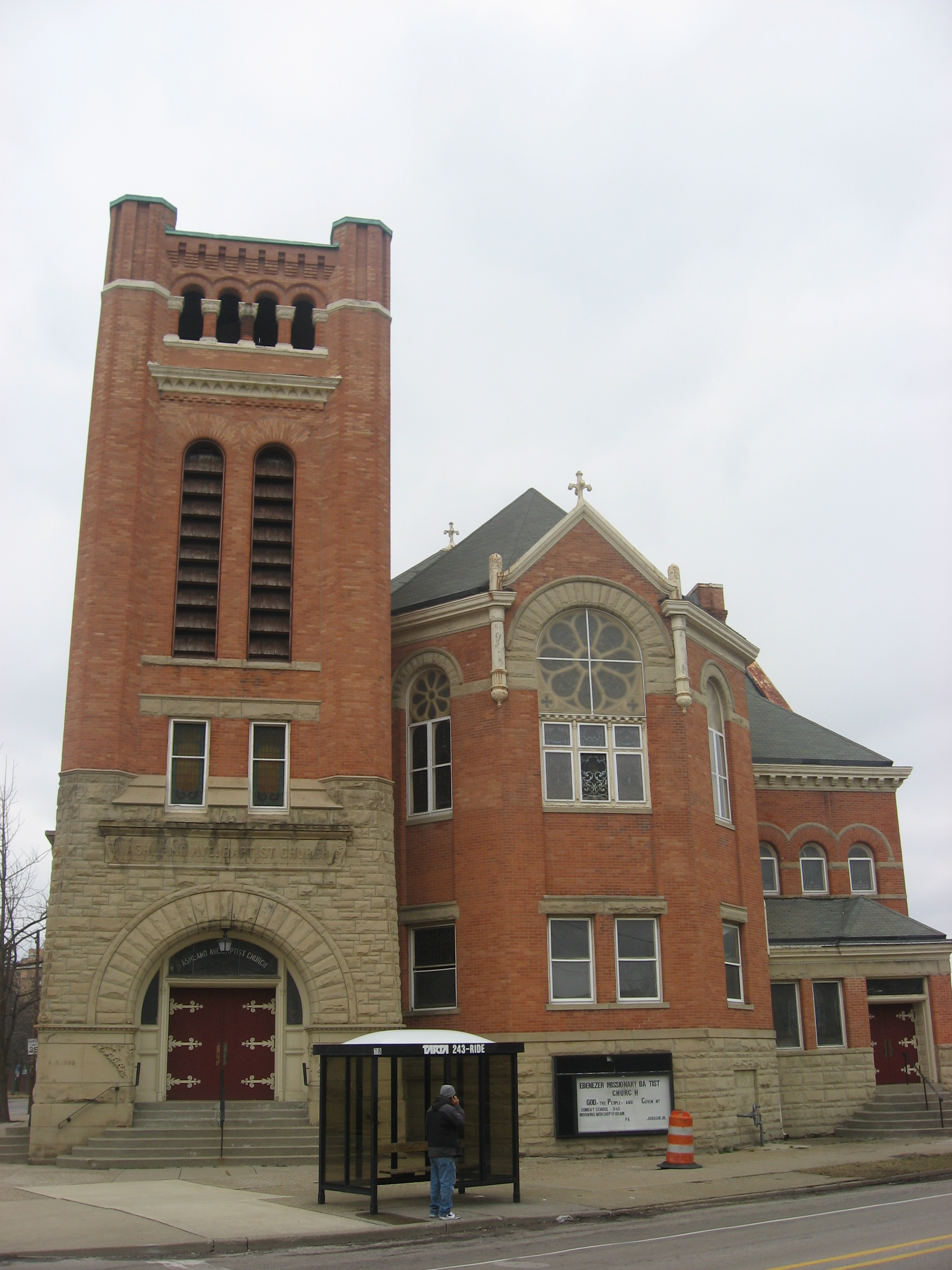
Ashland Baptist Church

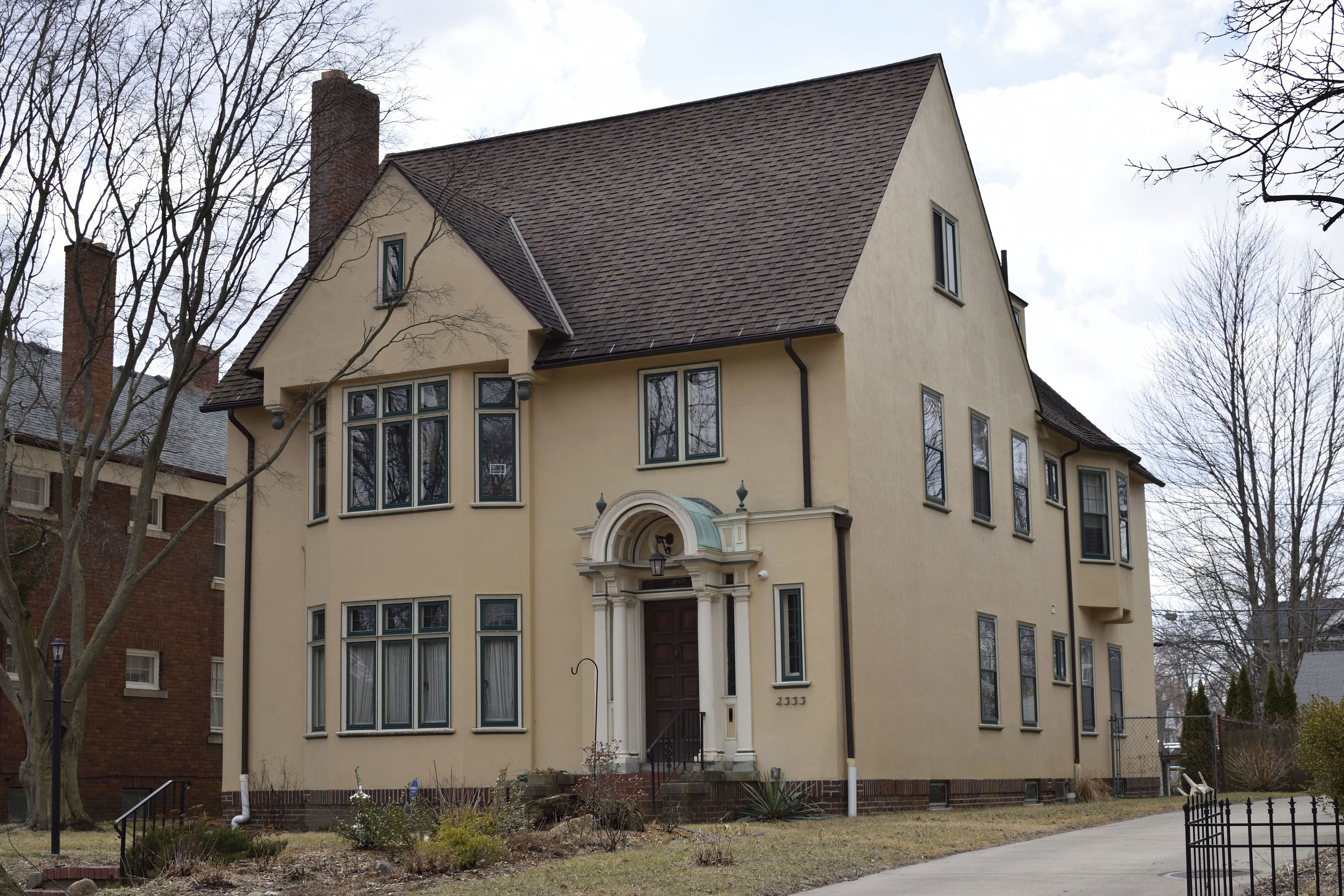
The home that David Stine designed for himself and his wife Adelaide, seen here in 2019

David Leander Stine (January 4, 1857 – August 3, 1941) was an architect in Toledo, Ohio. His work includes the Brumback Library, Lucas County Courthouse and Jail (1897) and several homes in the Old West End neighborhood of Toledo including the Edward D. Libbey House (1895) (Toledo Society for the Handicapped).

== Work ==
- Lucas County Courthouse and Jail (1897)
- Brumback Library

=== Old West End ===
- Edward D. Libbey House (1895), a National Landmark
- Ashland Baptist Church at 2001 Ashland
- Julius Lamon House at 2056 Scottwood
- George Allen House 2238 Scottwood
- John Barber House at 2271 Scottwood
- Frank Zahm House at 2345 Collingwood
- James Robinson House at 2104 Parkwood
- Coldham House at 2243 Robinwood
