= Collingwood Arts Center =

Coordinates: 41°40′03″N 83°33′21″W

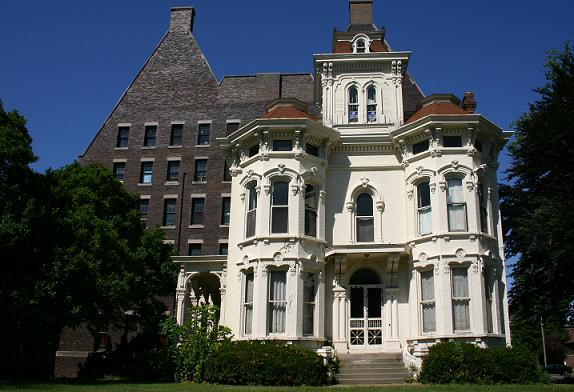
Gerber House and Collingwood Arts Center 2413 Collingwood Blvd, Toledo OH 43620

The Collingwood Arts Center (CAC) is located at 2413 Collingwood in Toledo, Ohio in the Old West End neighborhood

The center has been "Creatively serving visual and performing artists with residential, studio, and theatre space since 1985"

== History ==
"The Collingwood Arts Center is the former convent for the Ursuline Order of the Sacred Heart, and later housed the Mary Manse College and St. Ursula Academy. It is a registered historical site."

== Programs ==
- CAC Artist in residence Program; Has been Discontinued effective 1 MAR 2014 .
- The Lois M. Nelson Theatre and Performing Arts Program: This 600-seat theater hosts plays and concerts.
- CAC Arts Education Program: An opportunity "for the general public to appreciate the arts by immersing them in classes, workshops, and art camp activities."
