= Lucas County Courthouse and Jail =

Building in Toledo, Ohio

- U.S. National Register of Historic Places
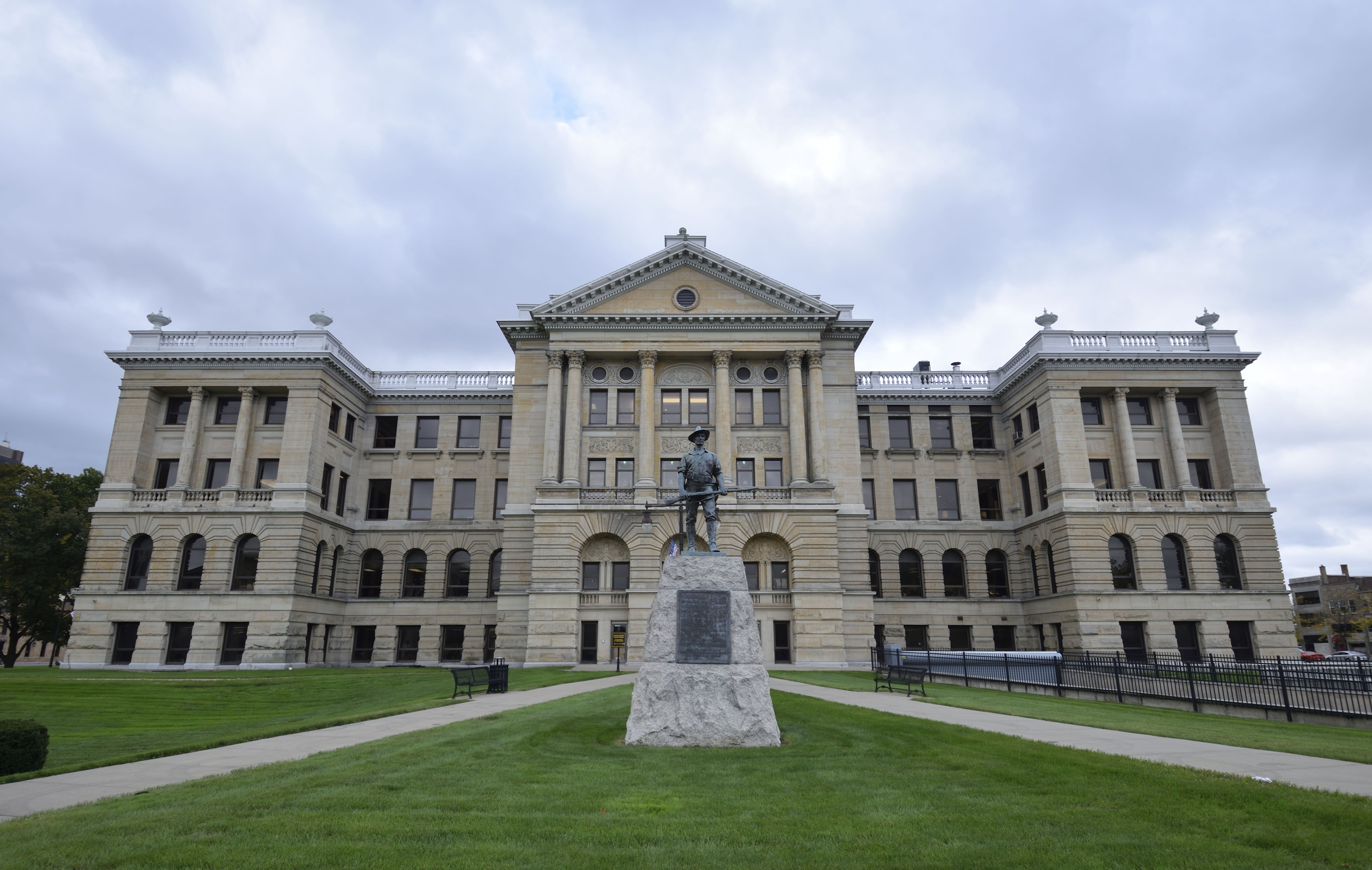
- Southwest facade
- Interactive map of Lucas County Courthouse and Jail
- Location: Courthouse Sq. and 810--814 Jackson, Toledo, Ohio
- Coordinates: 41°39′19″N 83°32′14″W
- Area: 6 acres (2.4 ha)
- Built: 1896
- Architect: David L. Stine; Dun, Perley & Co.
- NRHP reference No.: 73002295
- Added to NRHP: May 11, 1973

The Lucas County Courthouse is an architecturally-significant courthouse in downtown Toledo, Ohio, located at 700 Adams Street. The courthouse first opened in 1897. It was designed by David L. Stine, and the contractors were Dun, Perley & Co.

The courthouse was added to the National Register of Historic Places in 1973.

== Offices ==
- Lucas County Common Pleas Court (10 judges)
- County Prosecutor's office
- Clerk of Courts
- The nearby Court Services Building provides support services to the courthouse

== Gallery ==
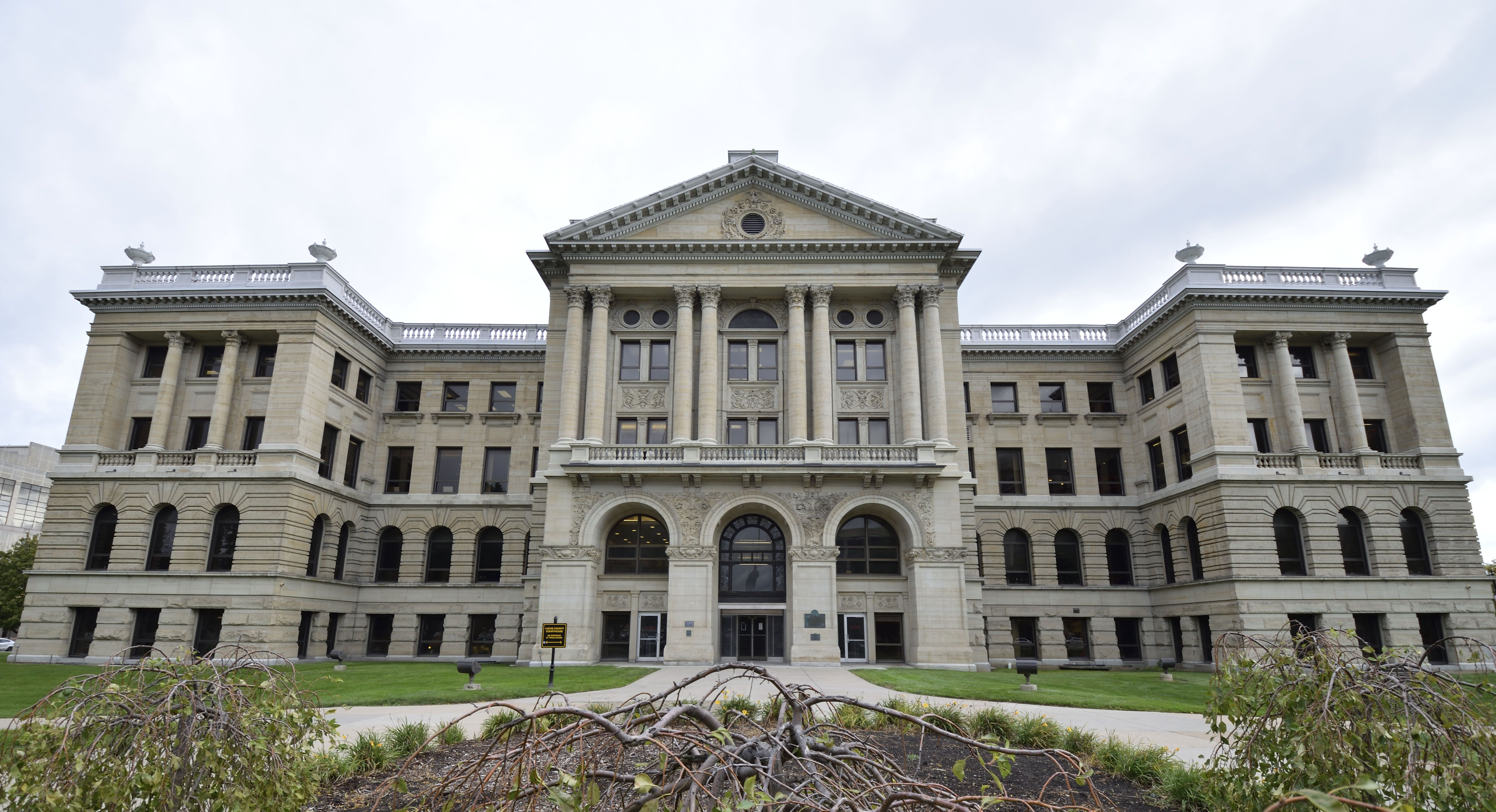
Northeast facade

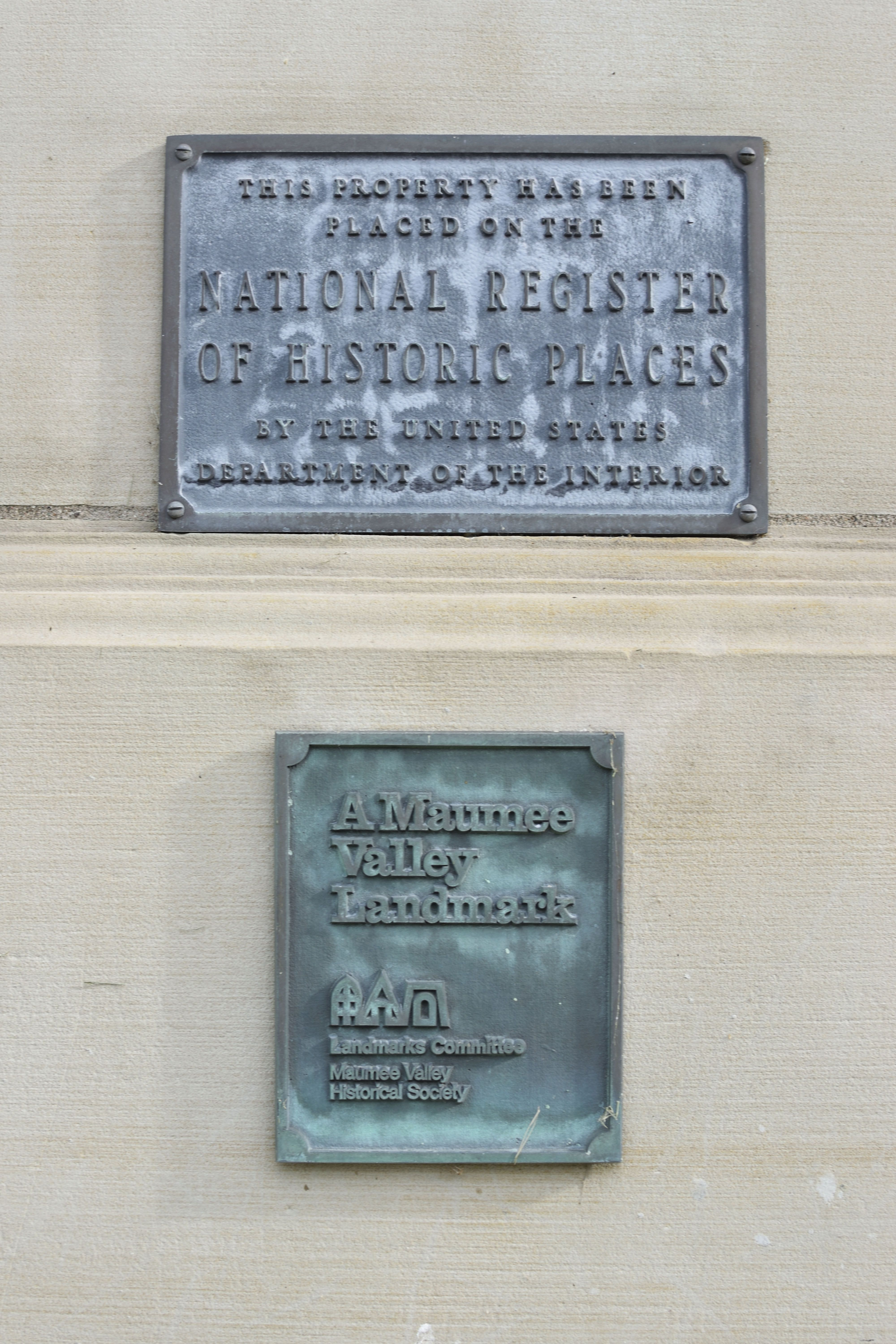
Landmark plaques

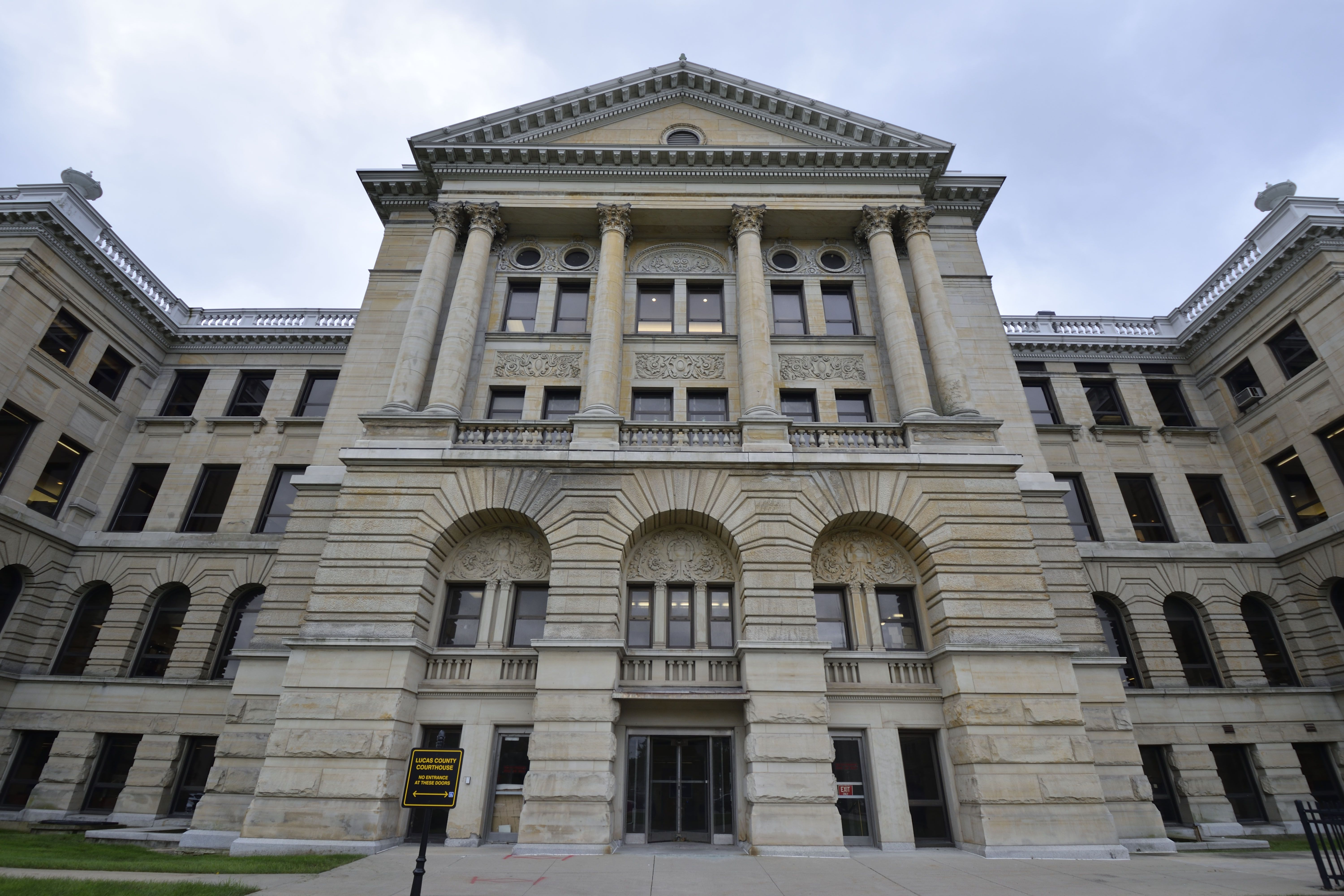
Main entranceway

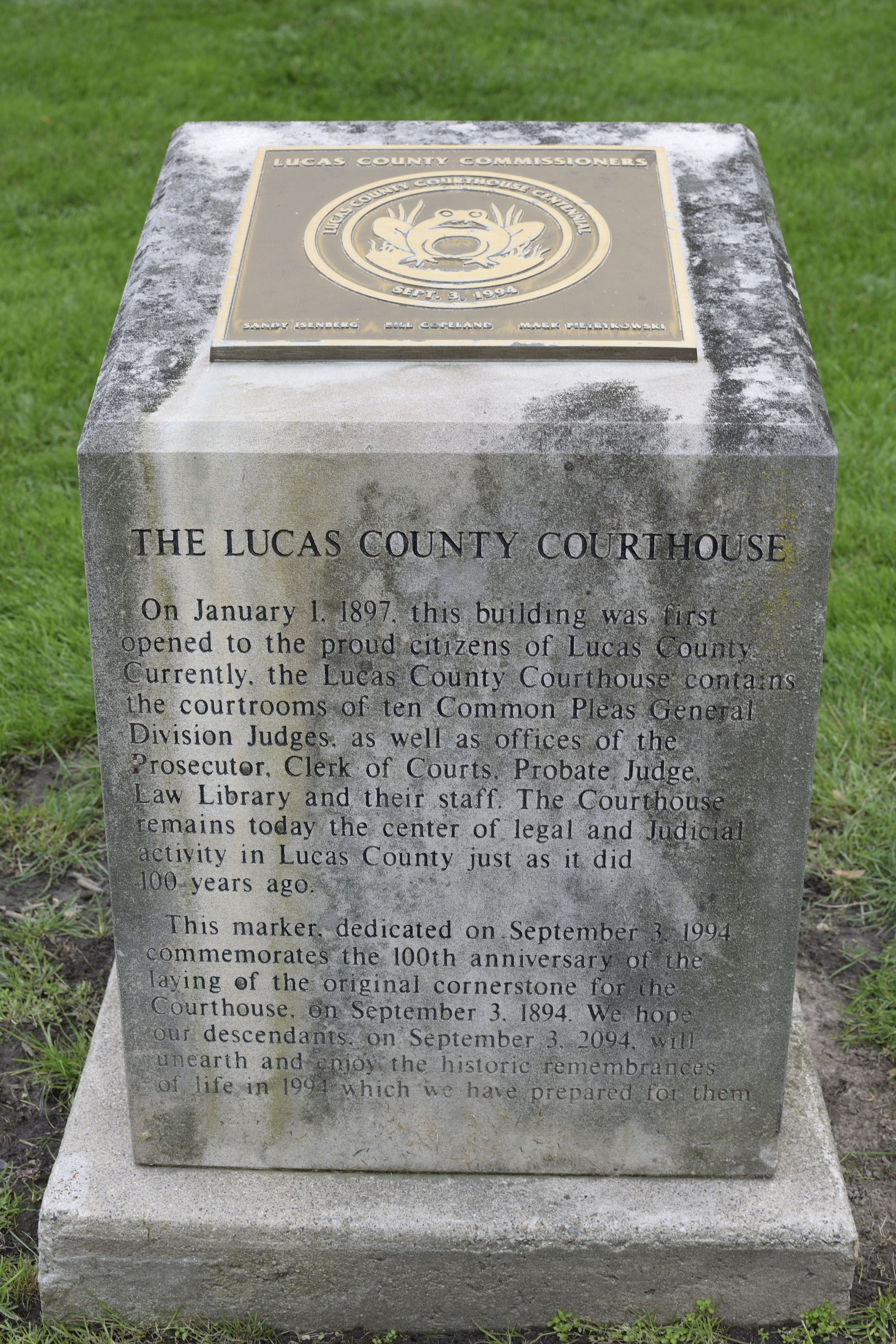
Commemorative marker

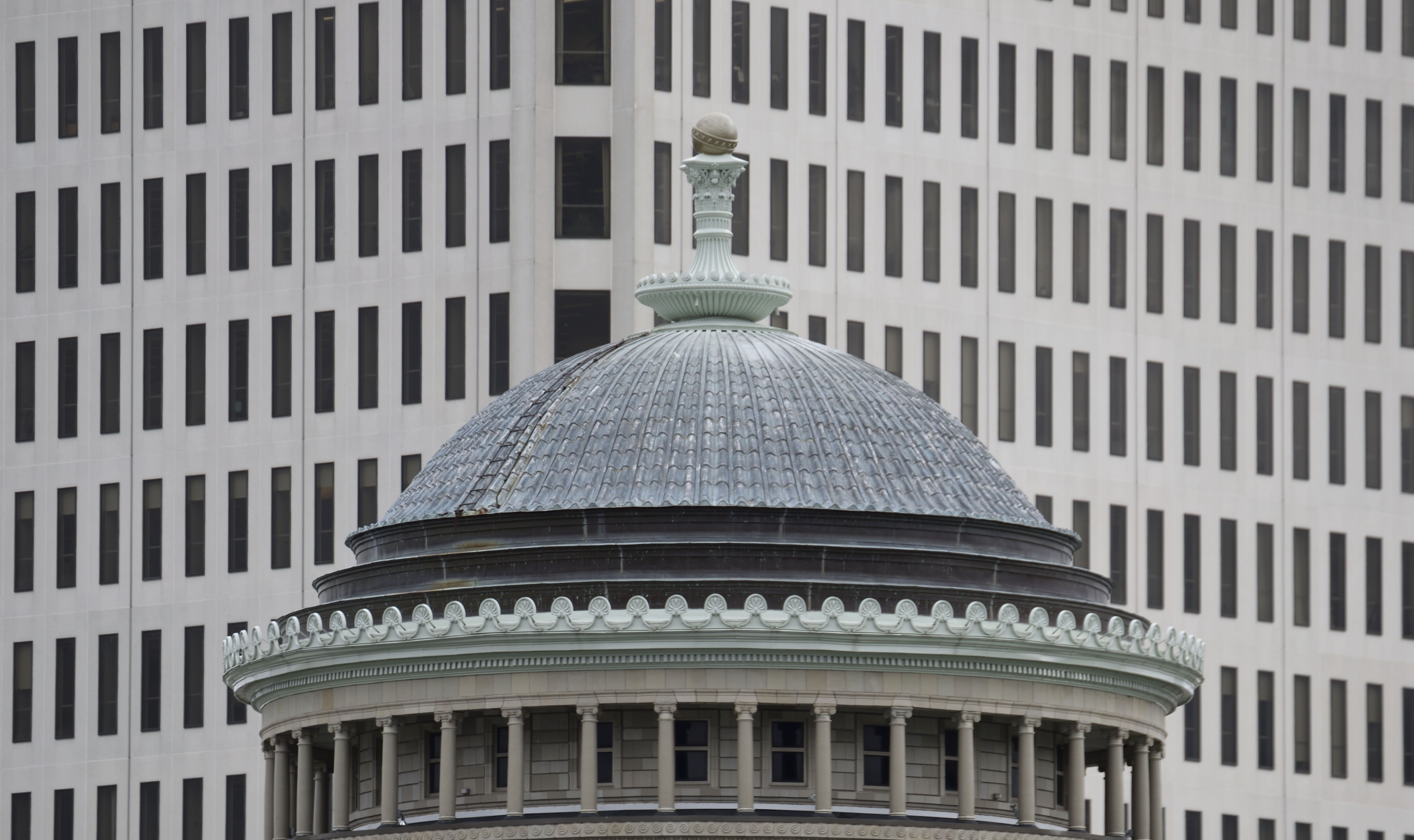
Dome

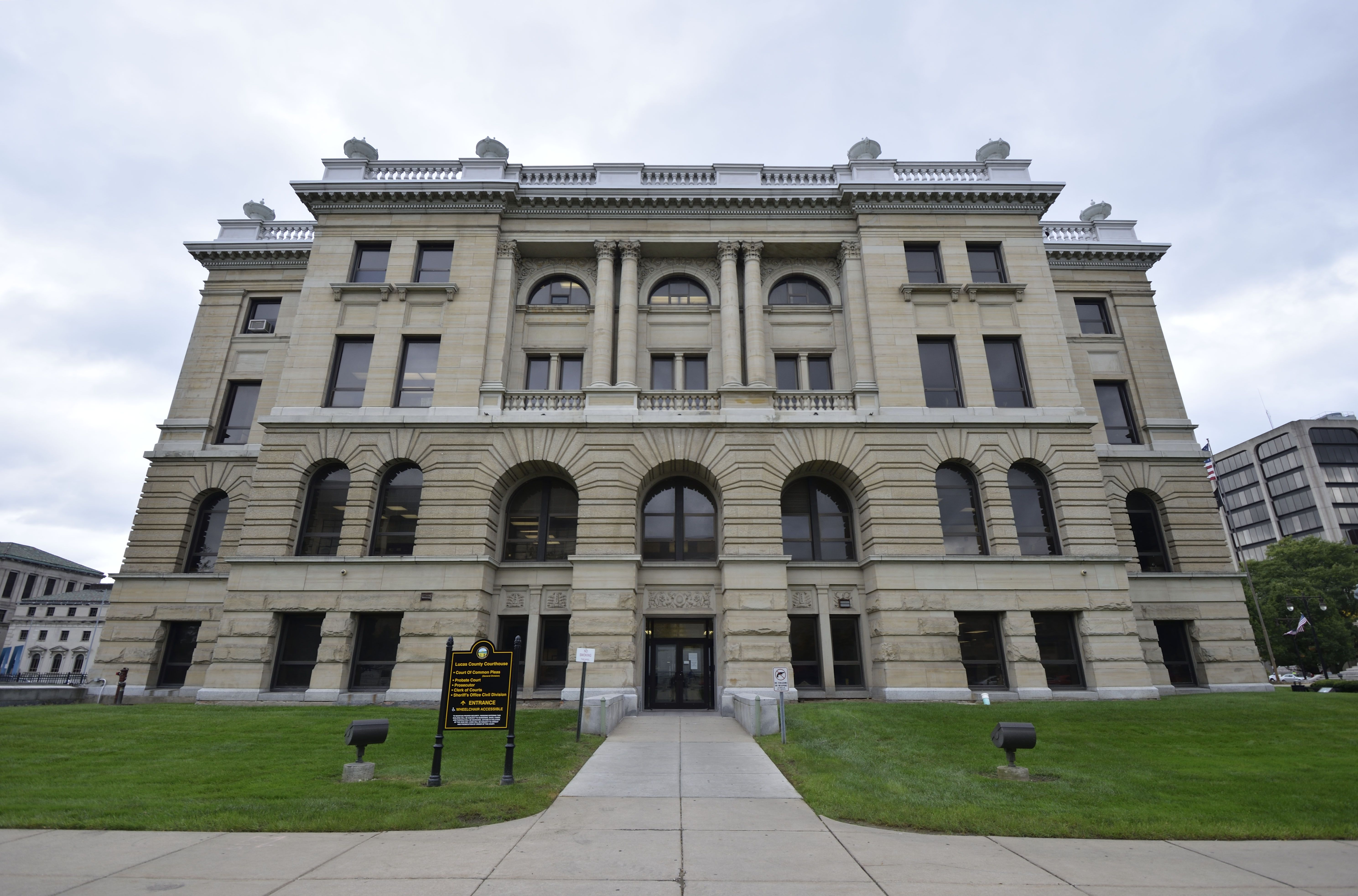
Side entrance
