= Wren, Ohio =

- Village
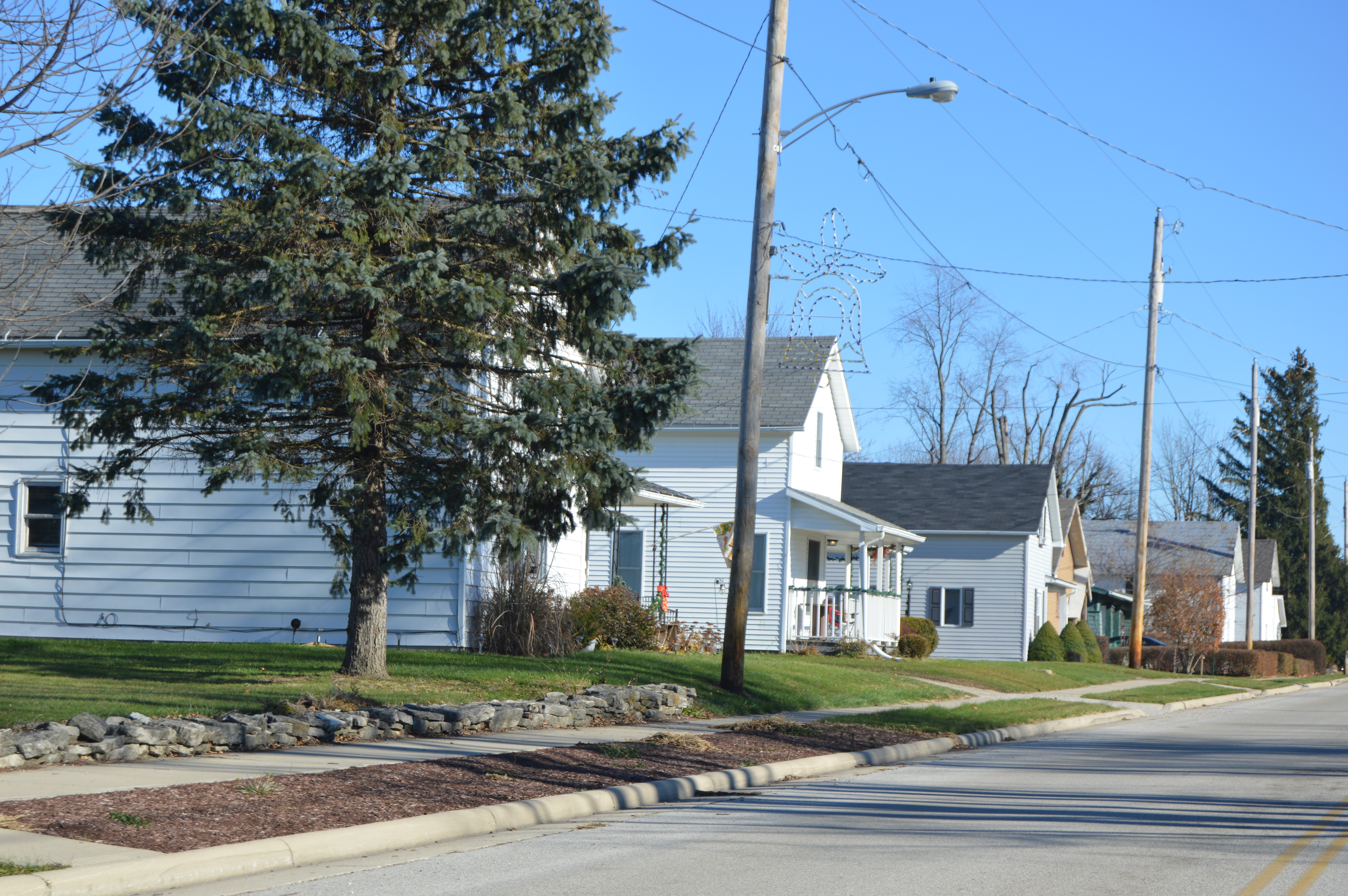
- Houses on Jackson Street

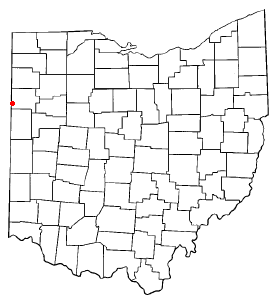
- Location of Wren, Ohio

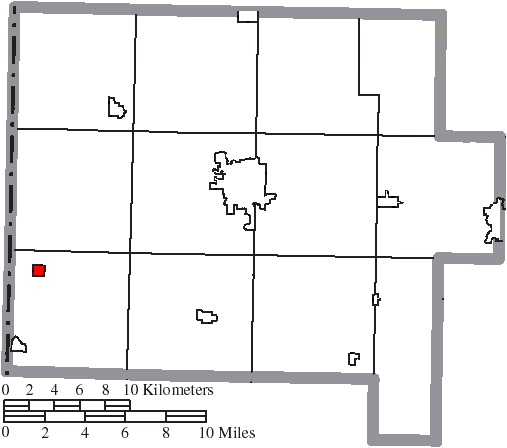
- Location of Wren in Van Wert County
- Coordinates: 40°48′03″N 84°46′29″W
- Country: United States
- State: Ohio
- County: Van Wert
- Township: Willshire

Government
  - Mayor: Monica Davis

Area
  - Total: 0.28 sq mi (0.72 km^{2})
  - Land: 0.28 sq mi (0.72 km^{2})
  - Water: 0 sq mi (0.00 km^{2})
- Elevation: 807 ft (246 m)

Population (2020)
  - Total: 165
  - Density: 595.0/sq mi (229.75/km^{2})
- Time zone: UTC-5 (Eastern (EST))
  - Summer (DST): UTC-4 (EDT)
- ZIP code: 45899
- Area code: 419
- FIPS code: 39-86632
- GNIS feature ID: 2399745

Wren is a village in Van Wert County, Ohio, United States. The population was 165 at the 2020 census. It is included within the Van Wert, Ohio Micropolitan Statistical Area.

== History ==
Wren had its start in 1883 when a store was built there. A post office has been in operation at Wren since 1883.

== Geography ==
According to the United States Census Bureau, the village has a total area of 0.31 square miles (0.80 km^{2}), all land.

== Demographics ==
Historical population
Census	Pop.	Note	%±
1900	242		—
1910	277		14.5%
1920	314		13.4%
1930	281		−10.5%
1940	277		−1.4%
1950	278		0.4%
1960	287		3.2%
1970	282		−1.7%
1980	282		0.0%
1990	190		−32.6%
2000	199		4.7%
2010	194		−2.5%
2020	165		−14.9%
U.S. Decennial Census

=== 2010 census ===
As of the census of 2010, there were 194 people, 78 households, and 49 families living in the village. The population density was 625.8 inhabitants per square mile (241.6/km^{2}). There were 93 housing units at an average density of 300.0 per square mile (115.8/km^{2}). The racial makeup of the village was 95.4% White, 1.0% African American, and 3.6% from two or more races. Hispanic or Latino of any race were 2.1% of the population.

There were 78 households, of which 29.5% had children under the age of 18 living with them, 52.6% were married couples living together, 3.8% had a female householder with no husband present, 6.4% had a male householder with no wife present, and 37.2% were non-families. 30.8% of all households were made up of individuals, and 11.5% had someone living alone who was 65 years of age or older. The average household size was 2.49 and the average family size was 3.16.

The median age in the village was 39.5 years. 23.2% of residents were under the age of 18; 6.7% were between the ages of 18 and 24; 28.8% were from 25 to 44; 26.9% were from 45 to 64; and 14.4% were 65 years of age or older. The gender makeup of the village was 50.5% male and 49.5% female.

=== 2000 census ===
As of the census of 2000, there were 199 people, 84 households, and 50 families living in the village. The population density was 642.3 inhabitants per square mile (248.0/km^{2}). There were 96 housing units at an average density of 309.8 per square mile (119.6/km^{2}). The racial makeup of the village was 98.49% White, and 1.51% from two or more races. Hispanic or Latino of any race were 2.01% of the population.

There were 84 households, out of which 23.8% had children under the age of 18 living with them, 54.8% were married couples living together, 6.0% had a female householder with no husband present, and 39.3% were non-families. 34.5% of all households were made up of individuals, and 7.1% had someone living alone who was 65 years of age or older. The average household size was 2.37 and the average family size was 3.12.

In the village, the population was spread out, with 23.6% under the age of 18, 8.0% from 18 to 24, 31.2% from 25 to 44, 24.6% from 45 to 64, and 12.6% who were 65 years of age or older. The median age was 36 years. For every 100 females there were 82.6 males. For every 100 females age 18 and over, there were 87.7 males.

The median income for a household in the village was $32,115, and the median income for a family was $50,000. Males had a median income of $32,045 versus $25,179 for females. The per capita income for the village was $18,060. About 4.5% of families and 6.7% of the population were below the poverty line, including none of those under the age of eighteen or sixty five or over.

== Education ==
Wren has a public library, a branch of the Brumback Library.
