= Brumback Library =

- U.S. National Register of Historic Places
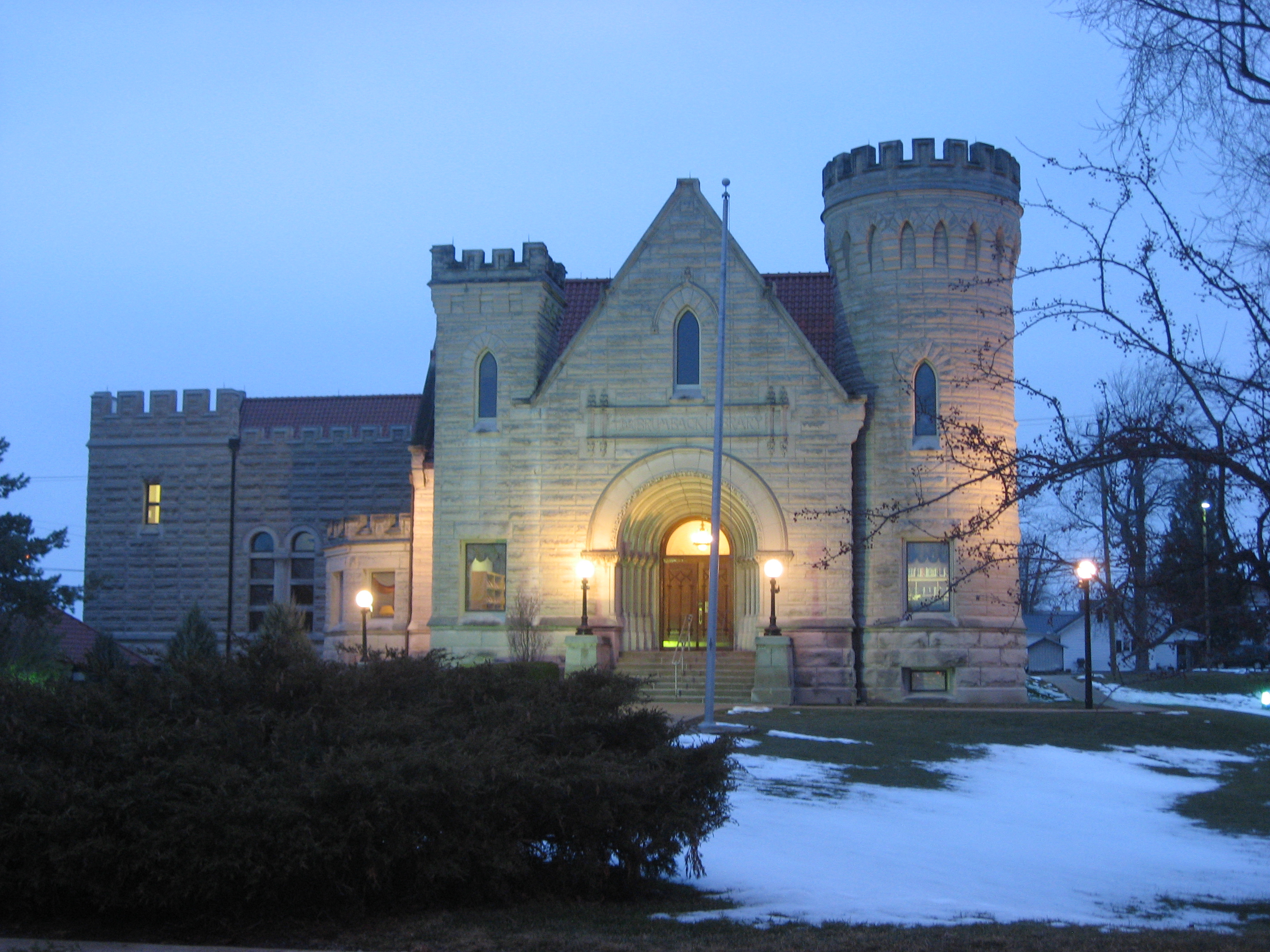
- Front of the library

- Location within Ohio Location within the United States
- Location: 215 W. Main St., Van Wert, Ohio
- Coordinates: 40°52′12.5″N 84°35′6″W
- Area: 1.7 acres (0.69 ha)
- Built: 1899
- Architect: David L. Stine
- Architectural style: Gothic Revival, Romanesque Revival
- NRHP reference No.: 79001973
- Added to NRHP: January 29, 1979

The Brumback Library is a historic public library in the city of Van Wert, Ohio, United States. Opened at the beginning of the twentieth century in order to serve all residents of Van Wert County, it occupies an architecturally prominent building by David L. Stine, which was constructed with funds donated by a local businessman. The building has been named a historic site, partly because of its place as the first public library in the United States to serve an entire county.

== History ==
Having decided that a public library would greatly benefit their community, a group of Van Wert ladies incorporated the Van Wert Library Association in 1890. In order to finance their project, the ladies sought subscriptions at $3 per person throughout the city and sponsored public entertainment events to raise additional money. By the end of 1890, the ladies had purchased 600 books, chosen a librarian, and rented a room in which to keep the library; its use was originally limited to the subscribers. Their efforts became recognized throughout the community, and in 1896 the city council enacted a 0.03% property tax for the library, raising approximately $575 per annum. Although the funds were sufficient to maintain the collection, the amount of work necessary to expand the library was prohibitive, the library experienced very little growth, and the founders soon realized that the library might not long survive once they were unable to continue supporting it. At this point came deliverance from an unexpected quarter.

Born in Licking County in 1829, John Sanford Brumback settled in Van Wert in 1862 and eventually became one of the city's leading businessmen. As his health was failing in the late nineteenth century, Brumback decided to engage in philanthropy, and following his death in December 1897, his bequest of a large sum to the library was announced. Furthermore, his other heirs agreed to spend additional money on the construction of a building for the library, even though such an action was not required by the will. The most curious provision in the will was the concept of establishing a county library — no one had previously entertained such an idea, which was generally believed impossible when it was first announced, but discussion in the county's Granges produced virtually unanimous support among the county's farmers, and the mass desire for such a library prompted the state legislature to pass the necessary enabling legislation in the following April. Ownership of the library collection was transferred by a contract among the county commissioners, the Van Wert Library Association, and Brumback's heirs: the library ladies were to give their books, the heirs were to arrange for the construction of a library building in a Van Wert city park, and the county was to enact a permanent property tax for the library's continued support. The cornerstone was laid on July 18, 1899; construction occupied the entirety of 1900. Financial support from the Brumback estate surpassed $50,000.

The Brumback library dedication ceremony took place on January 1, 1901, at the First Methodist Episcopal Church. The ceremony included a musical solo rendered by the baritone Charles W. Clark (who few years later would be known as one of the greatest baritone singers of all time). The library was officially opened to the public twenty-eight days later.

The first librarian engaged in extensive collection development, as the first six years saw the collection expanded from approximately 5,000 titles to 10,698. In order to further the goal of making Brumback a county library system, branches were placed in sixteen different locations throughout Van Wert County, and annual circulation reached fifty thousand volumes by the system's sixth year.

As the years passed, branches were closed; by 1968, locations outside of Van Wert had been restricted to nine pickup stations, although bookmobile service had been created to assist county schools. Seven years earlier, the original building's capacity had become strained as the collection reached sixty-two thousand books. In response, the library purchased the original Brumback family home; eighteen thousand titles were moved there, as well as facilities for serving parts of the county outside Van Wert. Further expansion was needed by the 1990s, so an addition was constructed and the original interior renovated in 1991; this is the only substantial renovation in the library's history, aside from a 1917 project to place a children's section in the basement. Additional branches have been reopened in the villages of Convoy, Middle Point, Ohio City, Willshire, and Wren.

== Architecture ==
The original Brumback Library building is constructed largely of sandstone, with a sandstone foundation, bluestone walls, and a multicolored Ludowici tile roof. Among its most prominent components are a round corbeled tower with battlements, a smaller square tower, and a prominent main entryway; when one views the library from the street, the round tower is to the right, the square tower to the left, and the entrance in the middle. A small flight of steps leads to the entrance, which is placed in a dominating central gable wider than either tower. Small second-story arched windows pierce the gable and the towers, while larger rectangular windows are located on the first floor. Together, these components present a somewhat eclectic appearance: architect David L. Stine employed both the Gothic Revival and Romanesque Revival styles, although the components combine to project somewhat of a Richardsonian Romanesque appearance.

== Preservation ==
In early 1979, the Brumback Library was listed on the National Register of Historic Places, qualifying both because of its architecture and because of its place in the area's history. Critical to its importance was its place as the core of the county library system: the Brumback was the first county library to be established anywhere in the United States. It was the second Van Wert County location to be added to the Register; only the county courthouse preceded it.
