= Old West End District (Toledo, Ohio) =

- U.S. National Register of Historic Places
- U.S. Historic district
- Mansion View Inn

- Location within Ohio Location within the United States
- Location: Toledo, Ohio
- Coordinates: 41°40′05″N 83°33′33″W
- NRHP reference No.: 73001503
- Added to NRHP: March 14, 1973

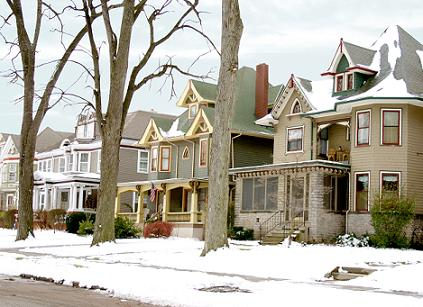
Examples of Old West End architecture on Robinwood

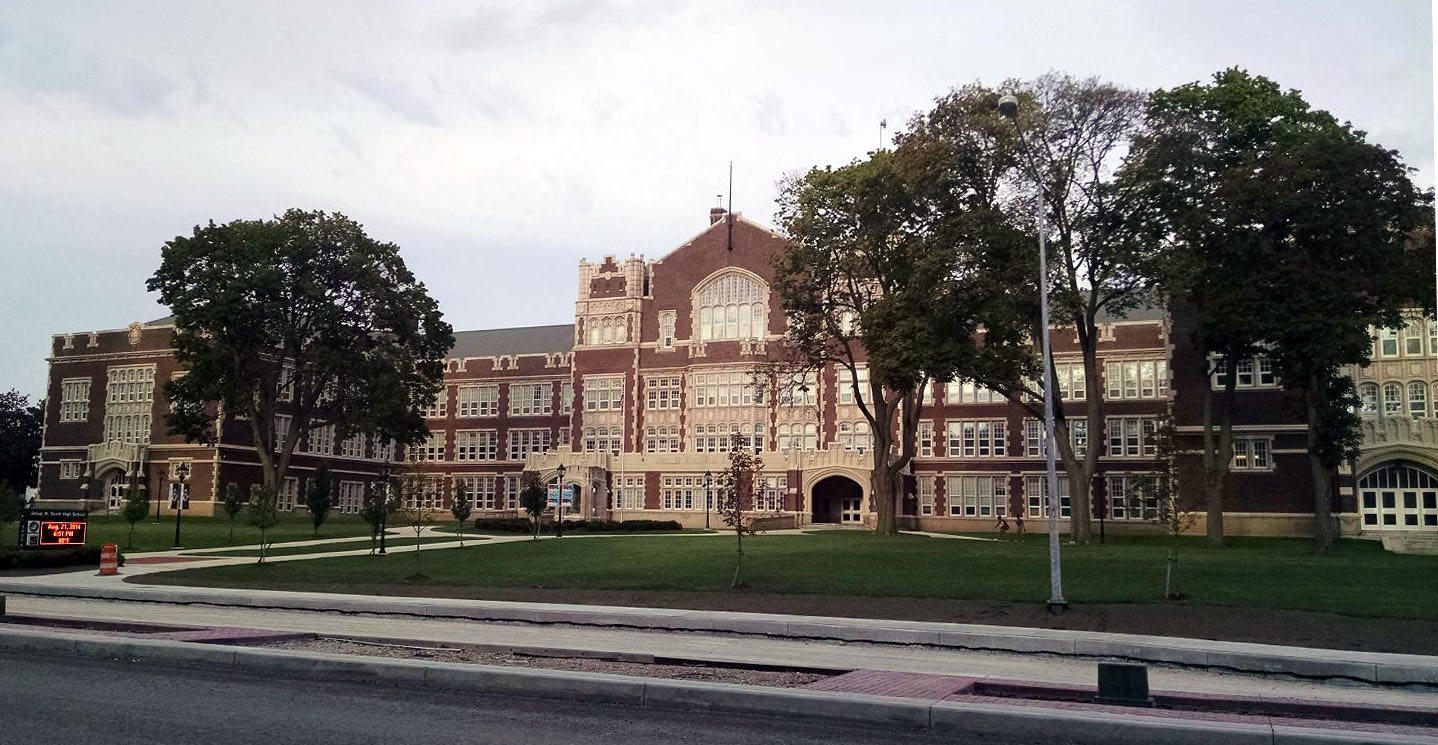
Scott High School after renovations

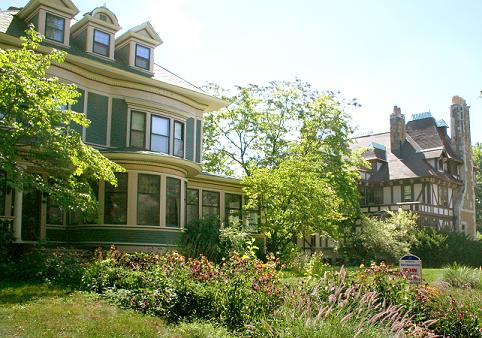
Robinwood near Bancroft

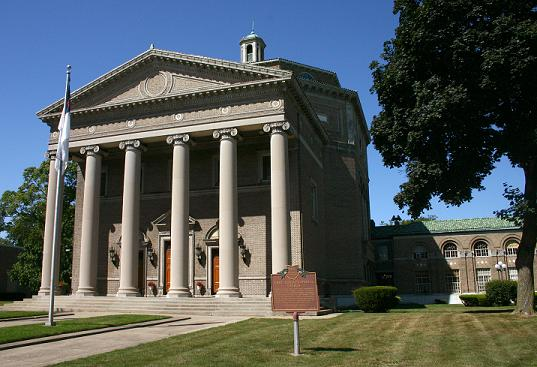
Historic First Congregational Church

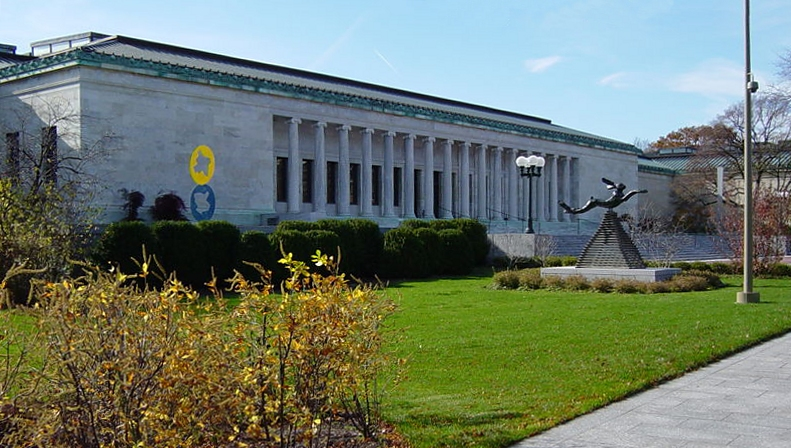
Greek revival facade of the Monroe Street entrance, Toledo Museum of Art

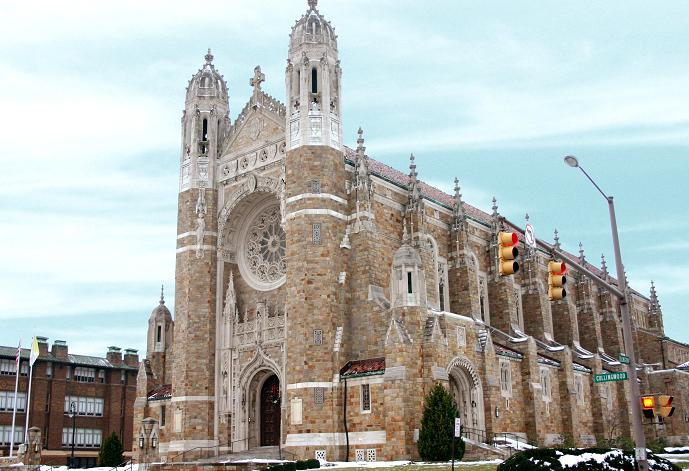
Rosary Cathedral: Toledo

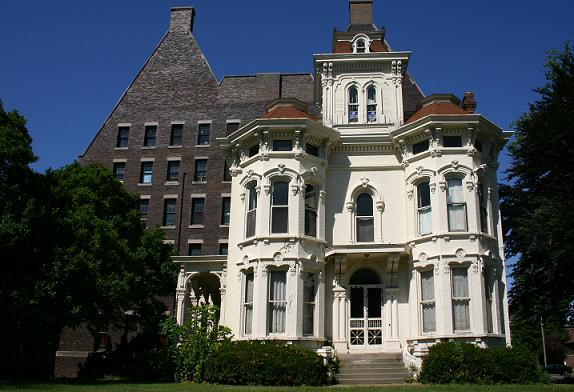
Collingwood Arts Center

The Old West End is a historic neighborhood in Toledo, Ohio and is considered to be "the largest neighborhood of late Victorian, Edwardian, and Arts & Crafts homes east of the Mississippi." The south end of the neighborhood is bounded by the Toledo Museum of Art and the eastern edge by churches of many denominations on Collingwood Boulevard. The area has homes varying in area from 1,200 to 10,000 square feet (930 m^{2}).

== History ==
In 1818, the first log home was built in the area now known as the Old West End; then in 1829, the first tavern and store were built.

The Old West End was platted in 1866, and "the wealthiest and most well-to-do of Toledo began moving away from their former downtown homes to live in this new development far from the city". The Old West End "experienced most of its growth between 1875 and 1915."

By the late 1870s, the area became a very popular place to live; "...families began to build 'out in the woods' in the West end.” In the heyday of the neighborhood, “Collingwood Avenue became known as the Avenue and eventually as the Avenue of Churches", because of all of the churches that lined and still line Collingwood Avenue.

The area fell out of vogue in the 1920s and 1930s. In the 1960s, its decline was hastened by the construction of interstate highways. “The construction of the I-75 expressway resulted in the demolition of entire blocks...”

Like most established U.S. cities, Toledo's historic areas declined, but the residents of the Old West End kept many of the historic landmarks from being demolished. Their efforts paid off; in 1973, parts of the Old West End were placed on the National Register of Historic Places as a historic district; this district was expanded in 1984.

From the 1970s, the Old West End neighborhood became home to a broadly diverse population of established families, elderly residents, artists and those interested in the arts community, partly because of its proximity to the Toledo Museum of Art. The community also includes singles, minorities, and immigrant residents. Many houses in the neighborhood have been restored.

== Festivals and Tours ==
- Old West End Festival: "On the first weekend in June, residents of the Old West End hold their Spring Festival, which features food, entertainment, tours of historic homes, and spontaneous garage sales. Citizen involvement in the Old West End is high, and this is reflected by its many neighborhood organizations."
- Old West End Garden Tours: In September, the Old West End Garden Tours festival features a tour of Old West End gardens, concerts, and food.
- Tours de Noel: In December, Old West End residents open up their homes for tours while decorated for the holidays.

== Neighborhood attractions ==
- Homes and Churches.
- Mansion View Inn
- Toledo Museum of Art
- Toledo Symphony Orchestra
- Rosary Cathedral
- Collingwood Arts Center

== Gallery ==
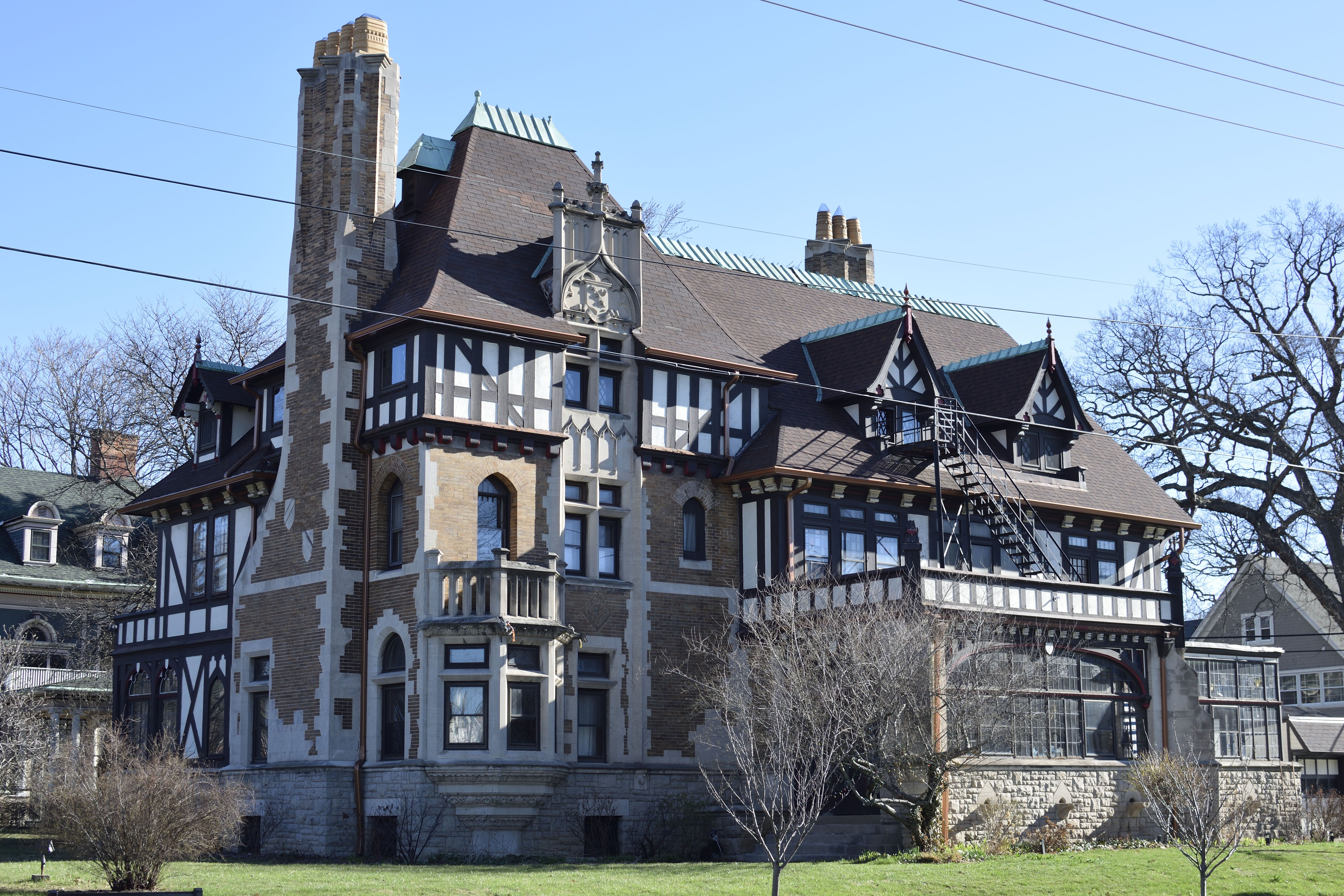
John N. Willys Residence in the Old West End, 2019

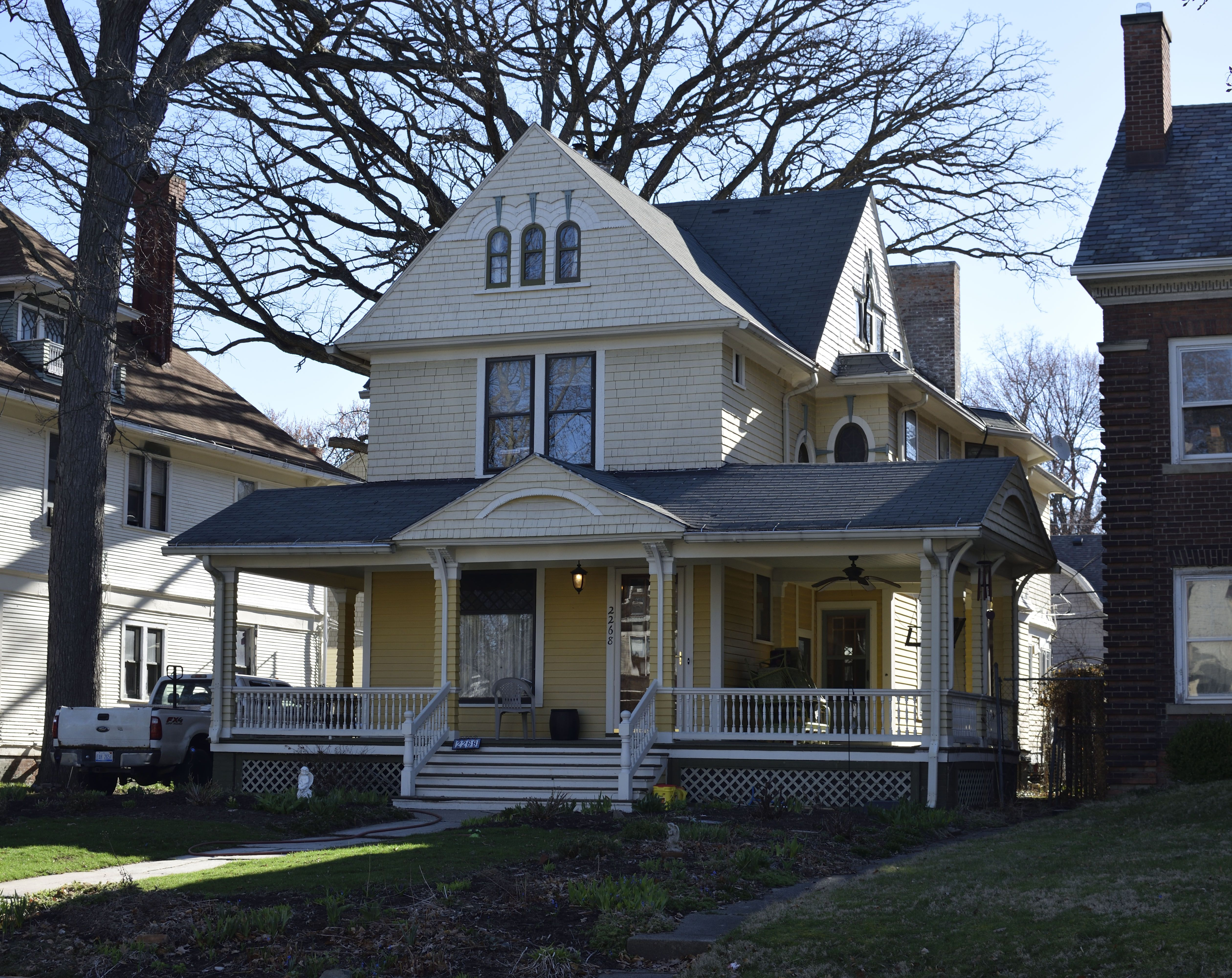
House on Robinwood Avenue, 2019

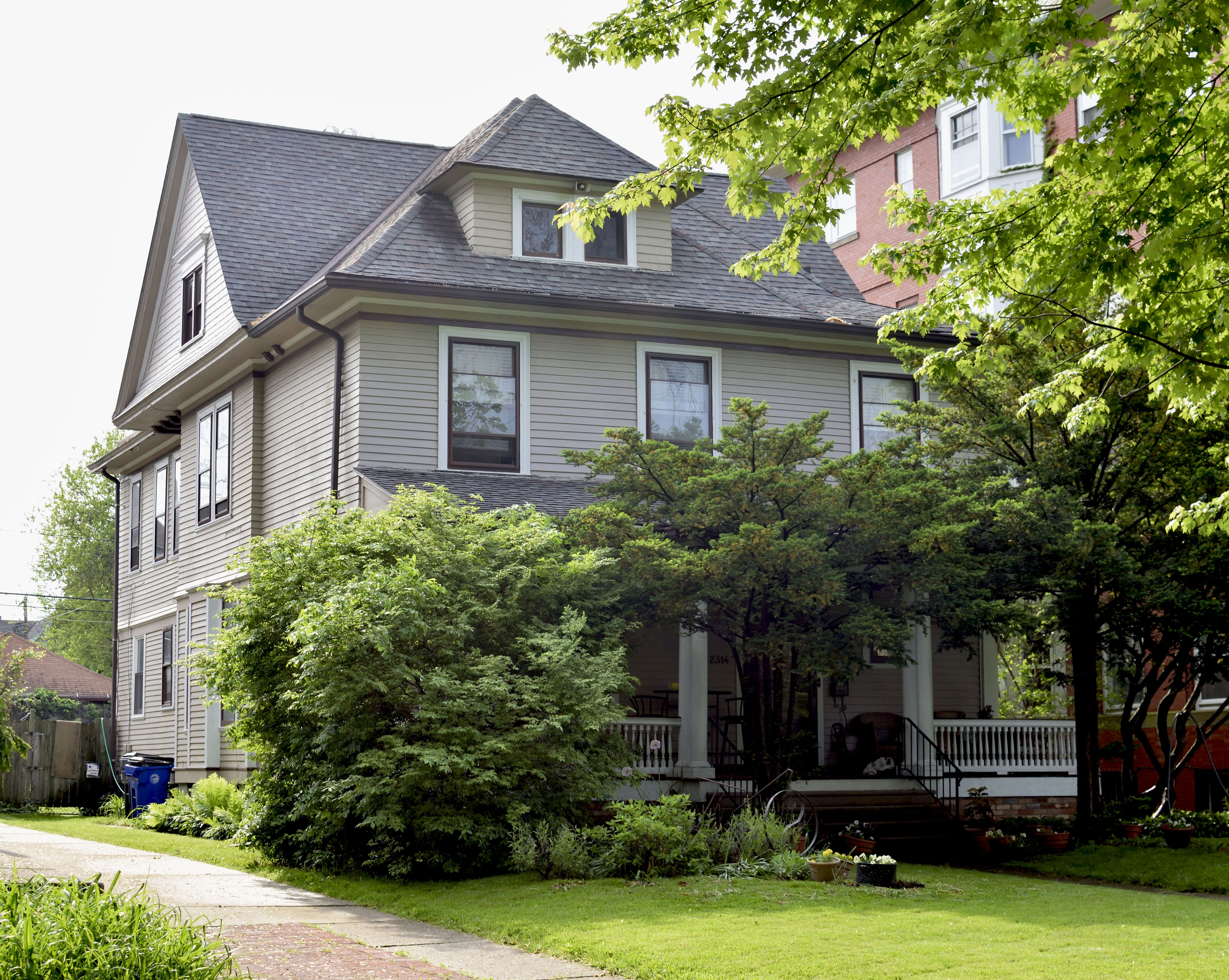
Haughton Residence in the Old West End, 2019

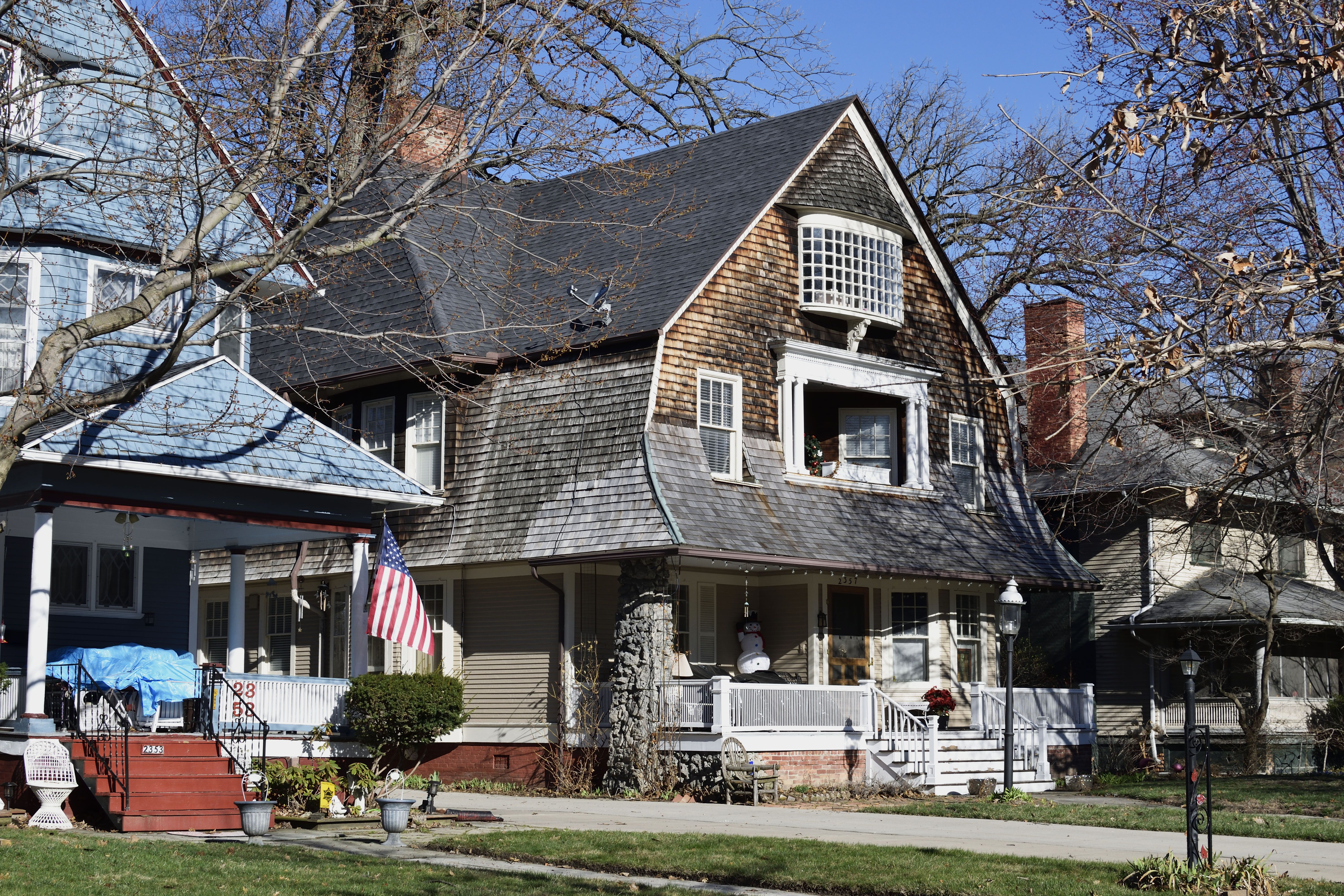
E.H. Witker Residence in the Old West End, 2019

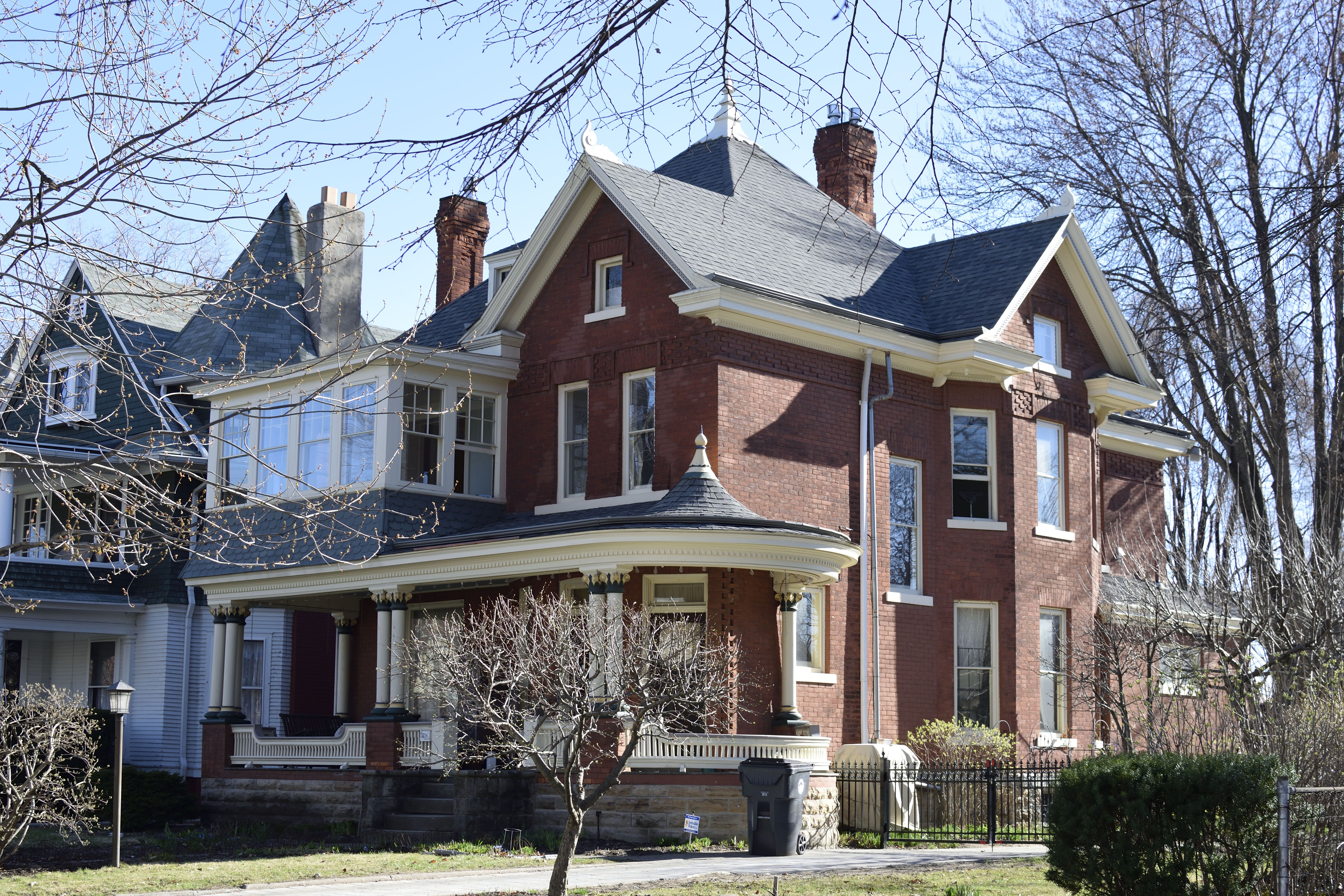
House on Robinwood Avenue, 2019

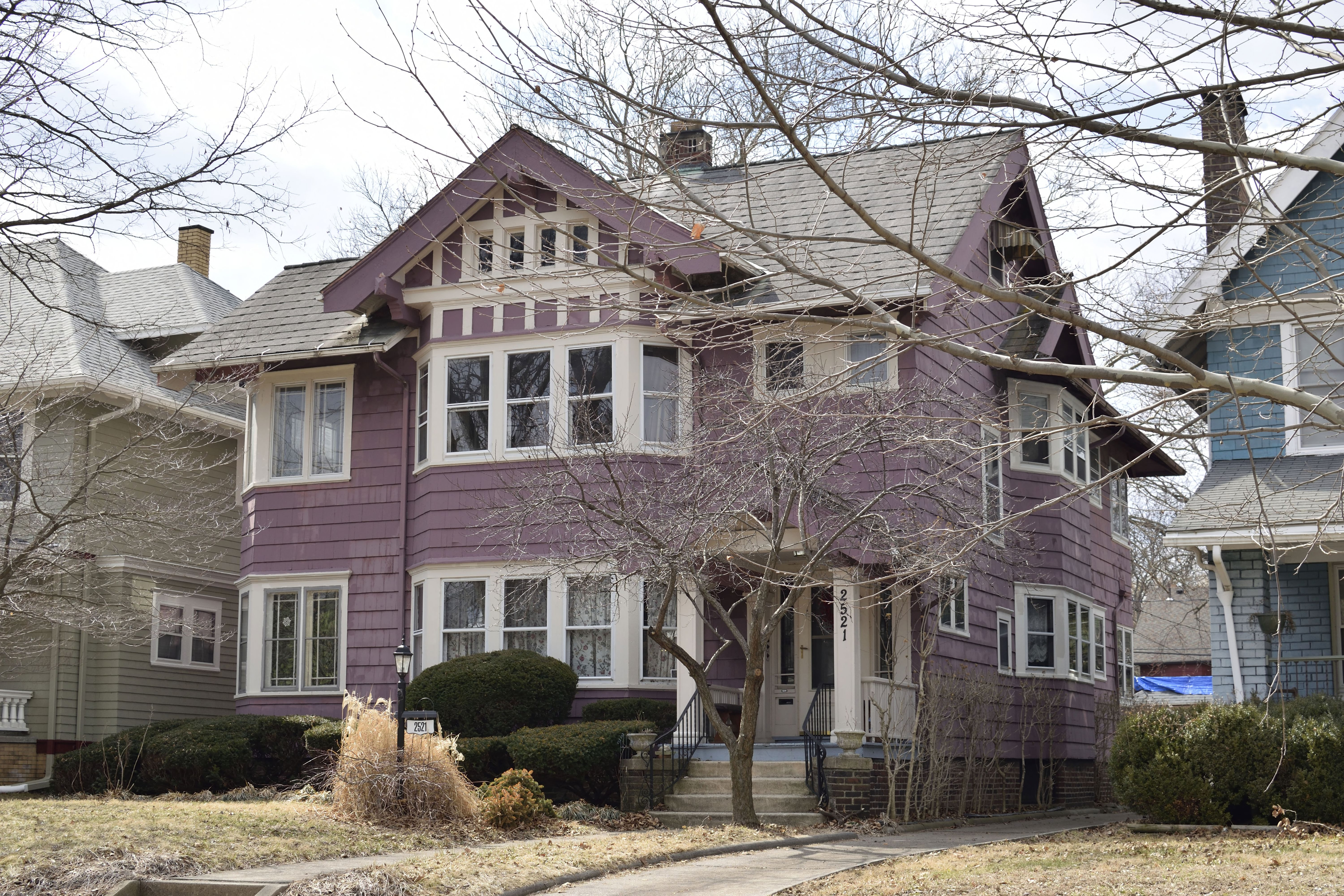
F. E. Cottrell apartment building in the Old West End, 2019

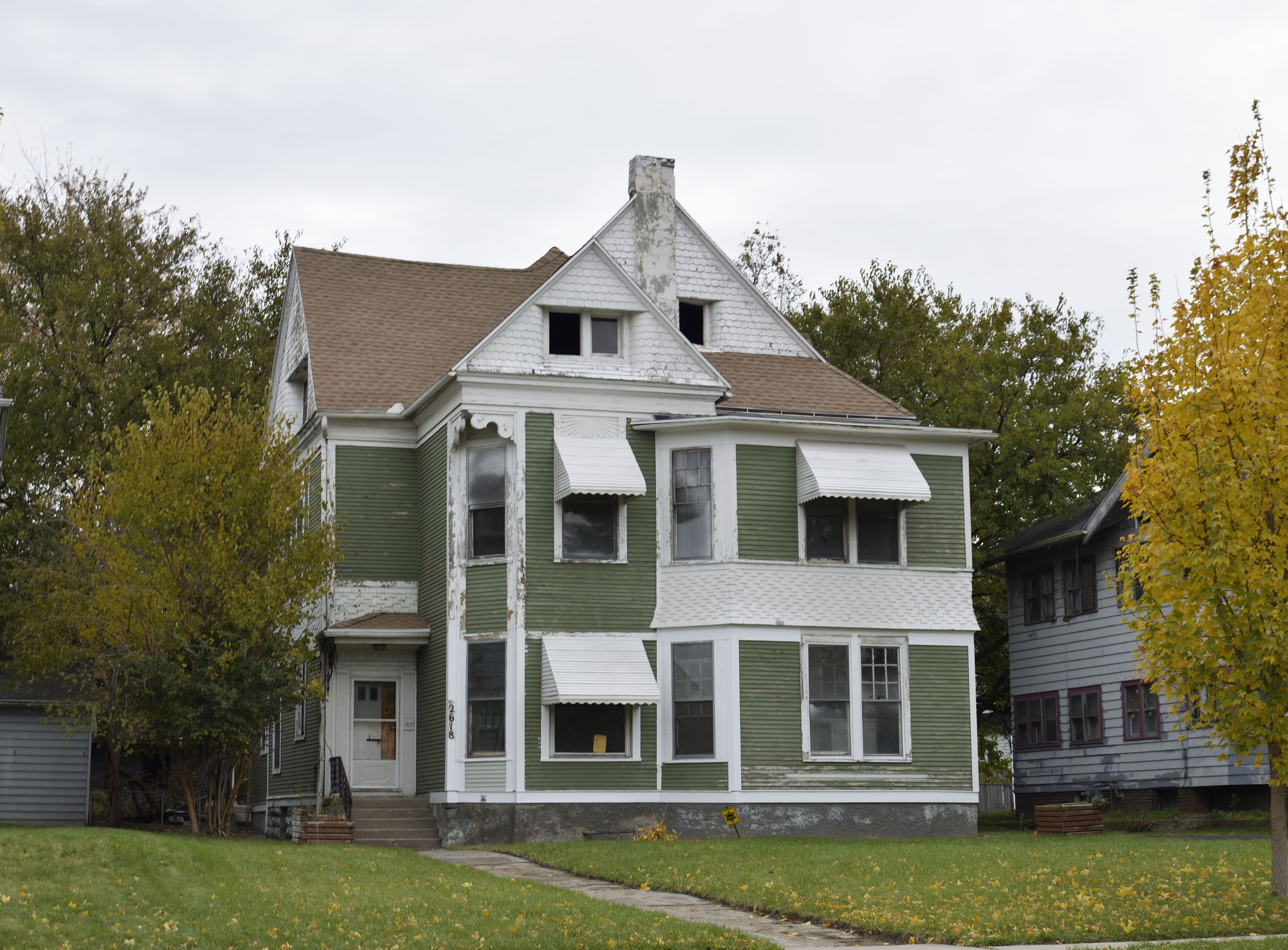
Collingwood Boulevard apartment building in Old West End, 2019

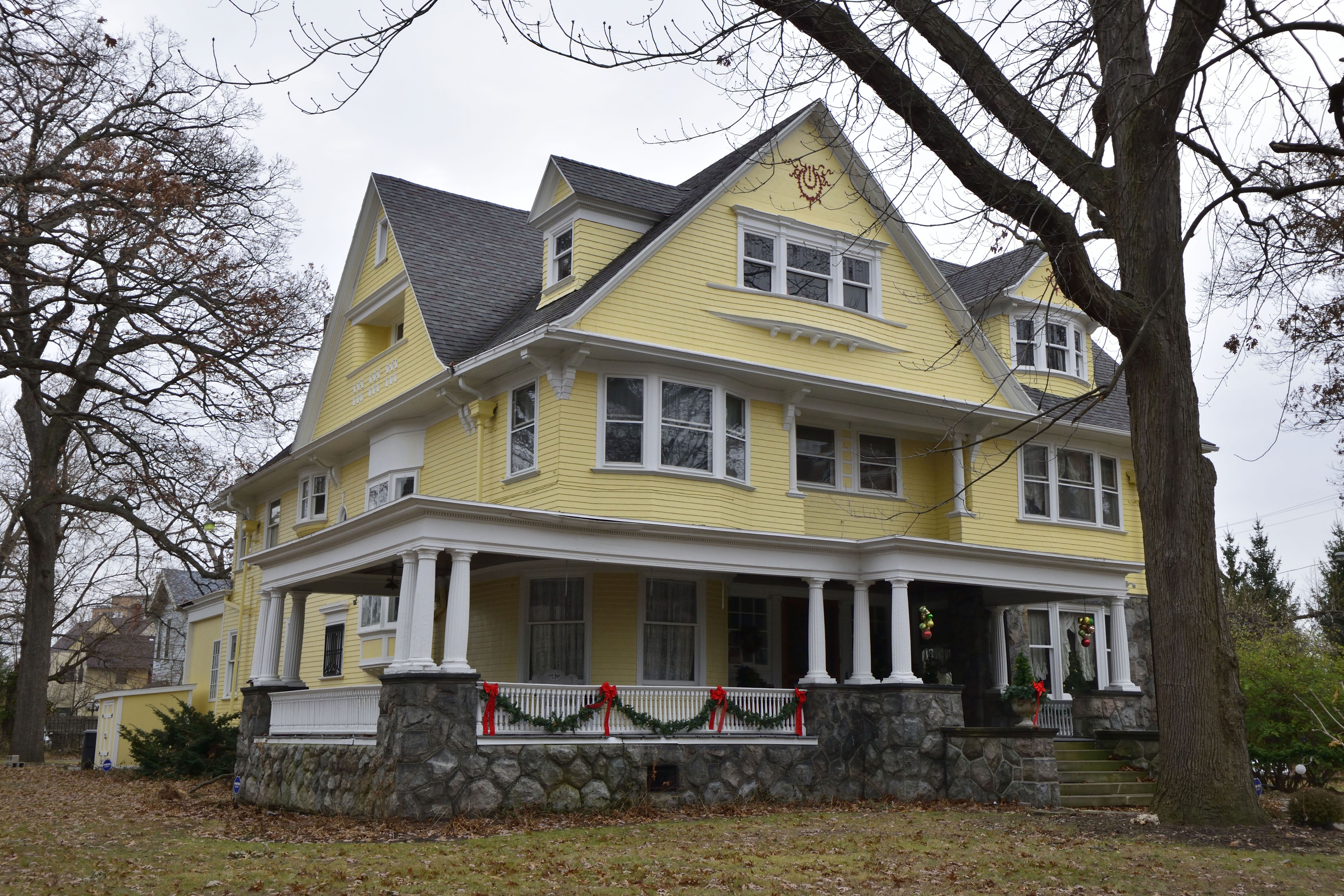
Edward Drummond Libbey Residence in the Old West End, 2018

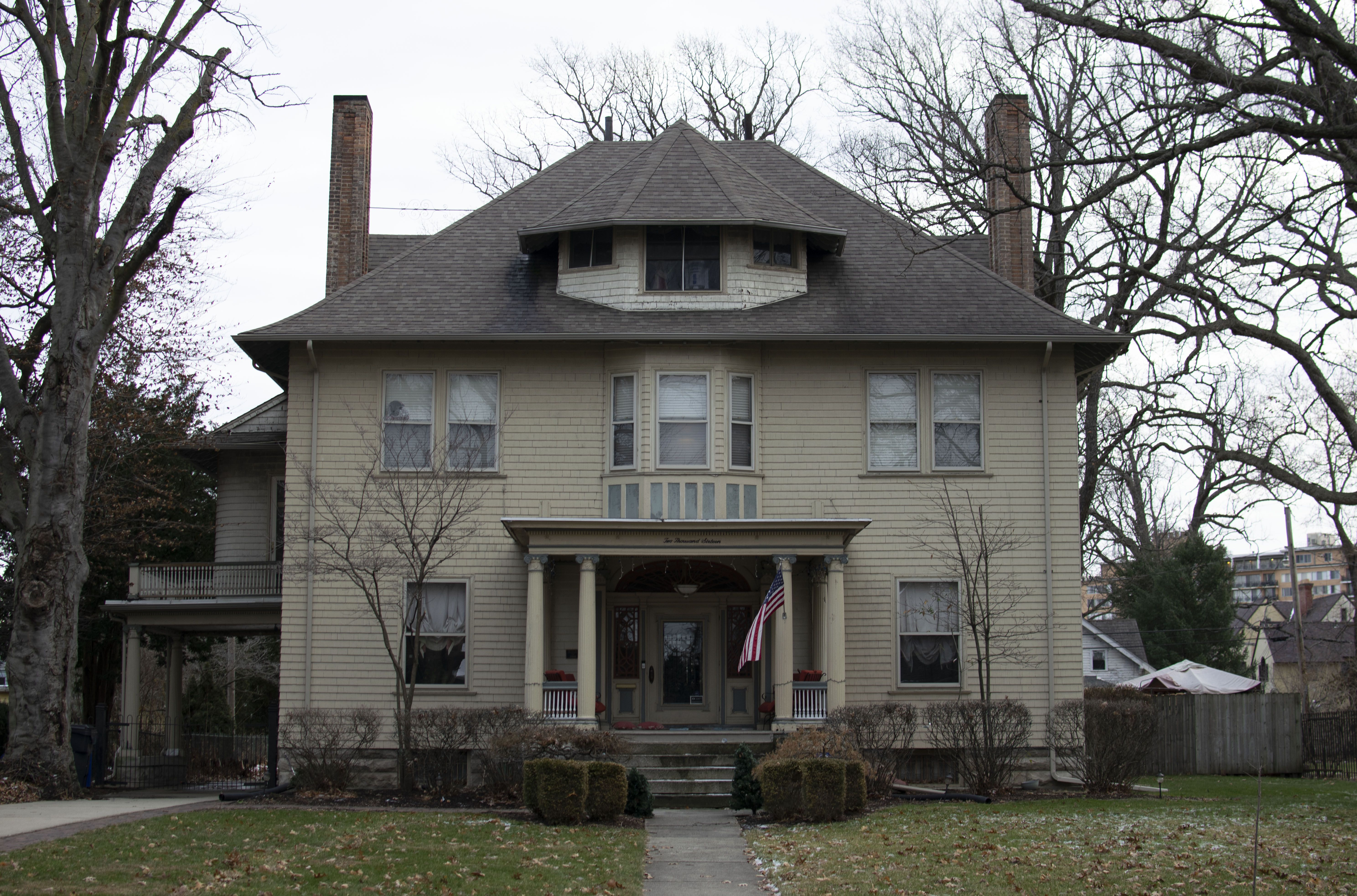
House on Scottwood Avenue in the Old West End, 2020

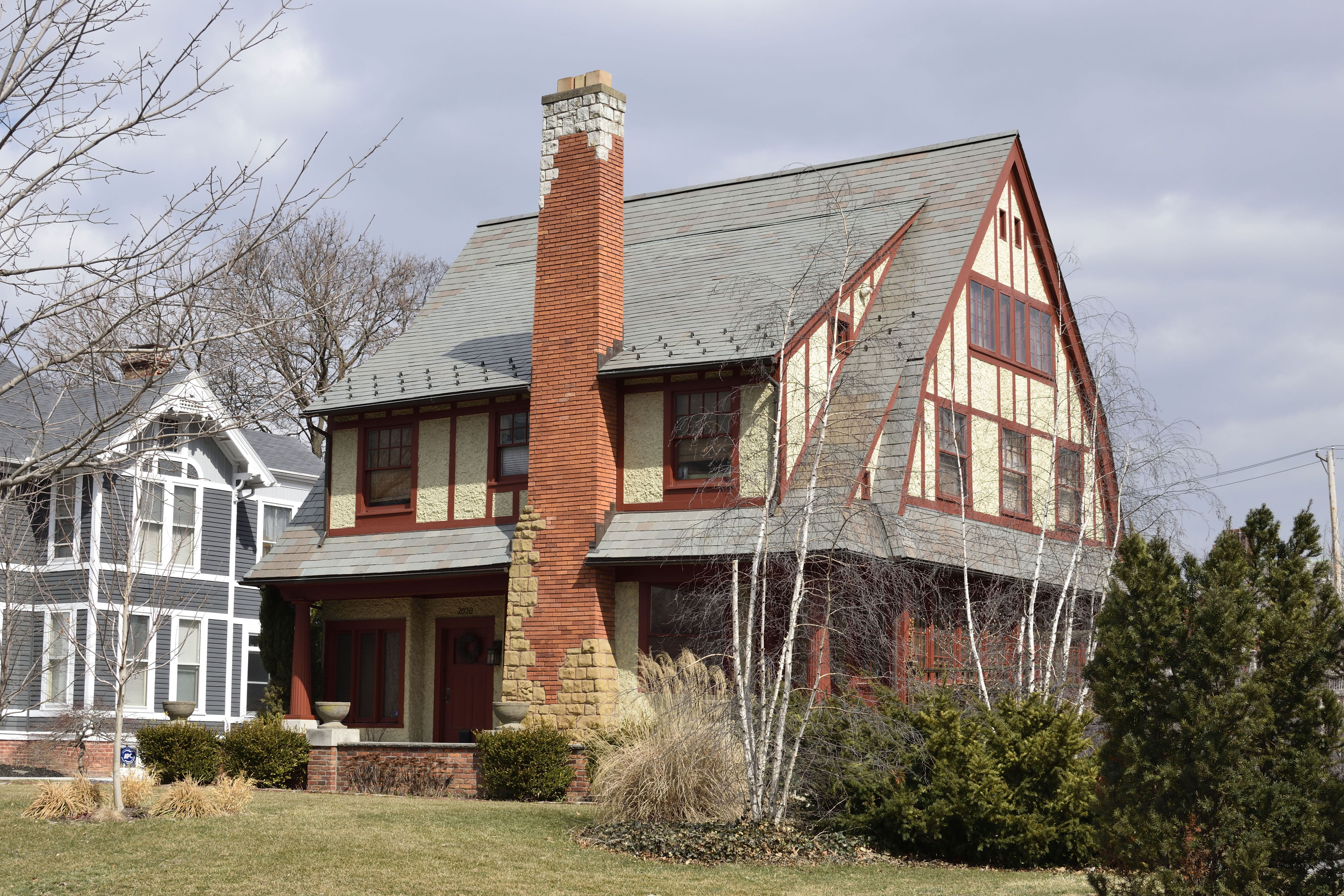
Harry W. Wachter residence in the Old West End, 2019

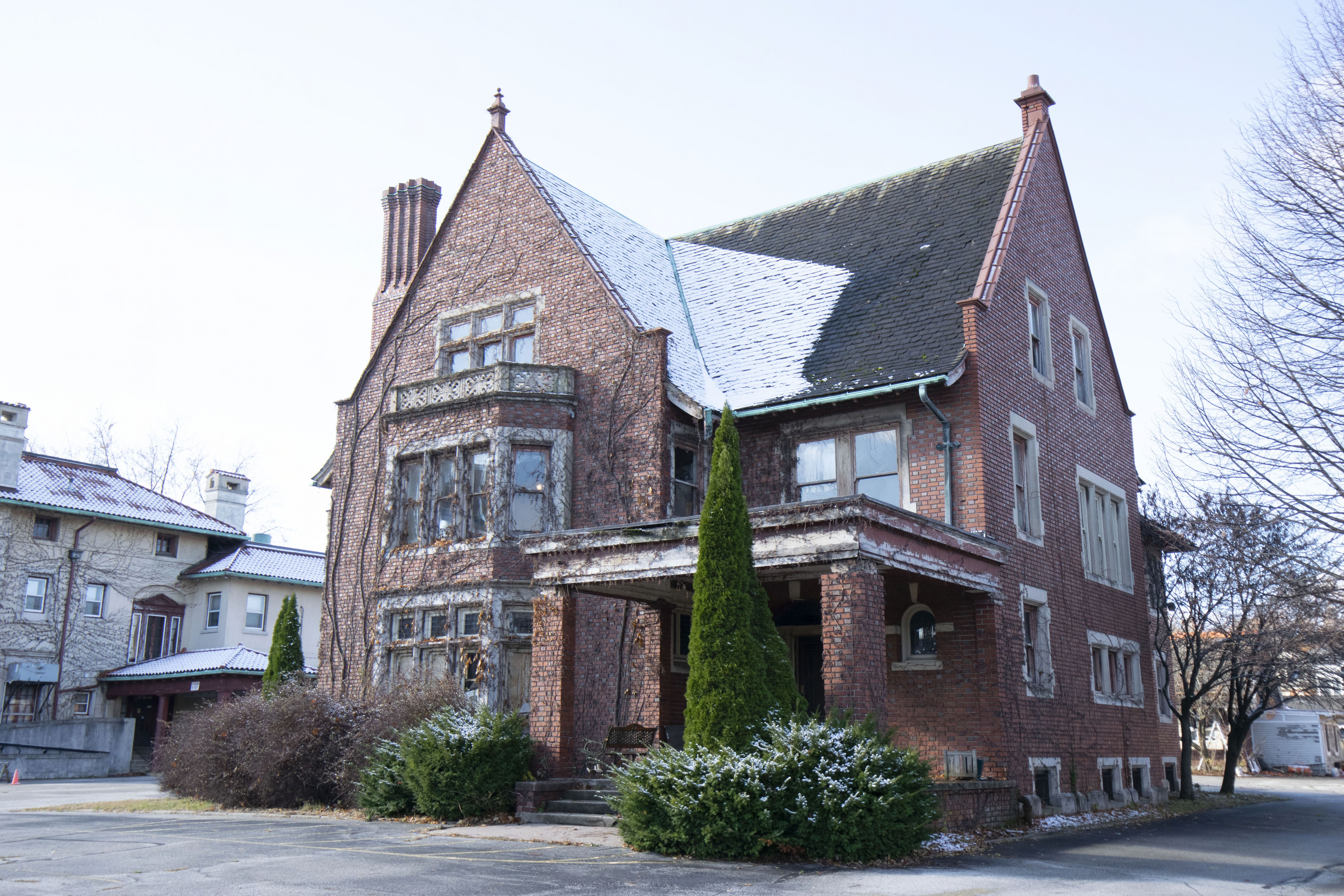
Reynolds Residence in the Old West End, 2018

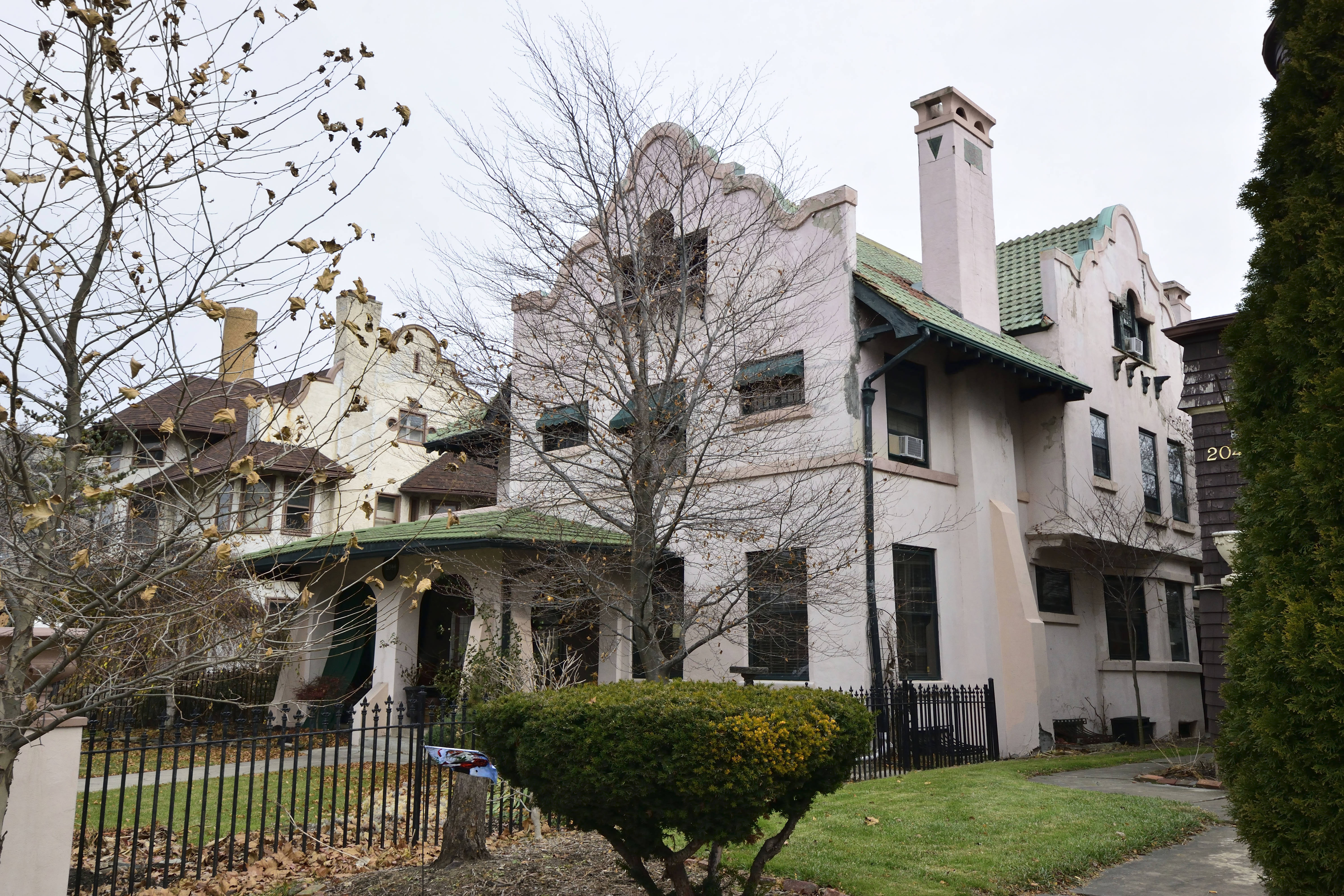
William Morrison Residence in the Old West End, 2018
