= Barney Francis =

American coach and college athletics administrator (1910–1978)

Biographical details
- Born: July 16, 1910; Wilkes-Barre, Pennsylvania
- Died: August 9, 1978 (aged 68); Maumee, Ohio, U.S.
- Education: Otterbein College; Columbia University

Coaching career (HC unless noted)

Men's basketball
- 1933–1937: Struthers HS (OH)
- 1937–1944: Shaker Heights HS (OH)
- 1946–1949: Lancaster HS (OH)

Football
- 1937–1943: Shaker Heights HS (OH)
- 1944–1945: Upper Arlington HS (OH)
- 1946–1948: Lancaster HS (OH)

Golf
- 1955–1974: Toledo

Administrative career (AD unless noted)
- 1946–1949: Lancaster HS (OH)
- 1949–1954: Toledo
- 1954–1973: Toledo (Business manager)

Arthur G. "Barney" Francis (July 16, 1910 – August 9, 1978) was an American athletic director and coach who worked for the University of Toledo from 1949 to 1975.

== Early life ==
Francis was born in Wilkes-Barre, Pennsylvania and raised at the Tiffin Junior Order Home in Tiffin, Ohio. He played for the orphanage's football team and went on to earn twelve varsity letters in basketball, football, baseball, and track from Otterbein College. In 1934, he married Bessie Chamberlain in Bay Village, Ohio. They had one daughter.

== High school coaching ==
After graduating, Francis coached basketball at Struthers High School. While working towards his master's degree at Columbia University, Francis recommended a Struthers' running back, Steve Belichick, to Western Reserve football coach Bill Edwards, who gave Belichick a football scholarship. In 1937, Francis was named head football and basketball at Shaker Heights High School. From 1944 to 1945, he was the head football coach at Upper Arlington High School, where he compiled a 13-3–2 record and won a Central Buckeye League championship. He then served as athletic director and head football and basketball coach at Lancaster High School.

== University of Toledo ==
On May 5, 1949, University of Toledo president Wilbur W. White announced Francis' appointment as athletic director. He was chosen over Charles Wertz, a former Toledo coach and city government official, who had the support of many in the city's industrial community. When Wertz was passed over, these men withdrew their financial support from Toledo's athletic programs, which forced Barney to run his department on a shoestring budget. In 1953, Francis, who felt that the university would attract a better football coach by pairing the job with the position of athletic director, submitted his resignation to president Asa S. Knowles. On January 19, 1954, Forrest England was named head football coach and athletic director at the University of Toledo.

Four months later, Knowles brought Francis back as the business manager of the athletic department. In 1956, he was given the duties of the athletic auditor, which included budgetary control of the athletic department as well as oversight of the ticket sales, gate receipts, rentals, and advertising. He also served as director of the local district and regional high school basketball tournaments, which were held at the University of Toledo's Field House. In 1957, he served as interim athletic director following the dismissal of Forrest England. Francis resigned as business manager in 1973. The following spring he completed his twentieth and final season as Toledo's golf coach.

== Death ==
Francis died on August 9, 1978, at St. Luke's Hospital after suffering an apparent heart attack at his Perrysburg, Ohio home. He was 68 years old.
