= Battle of Fallen Timbers Monument =

Statue serving as a monument

- Location: Fallen Timbers Battlefield
- Coordinates: 41°32′35.8″N 83°41′47.4″W
- Designer: Bruce Saville
- Material: Bronze
- Dedicated date: 1929
- Website: https://www.nps.gov/places/fallen-timbers-battlefield-and-fort-miamis-national-historic-site.htm

The Battle of Fallen Timbers Monument or Anthony Wayne Memorial is a statuary group created by Bruce Saville.

It was dedicated in 1929 at the site of the Battle of Fallen Timbers which took place on August 20, 1794. At that battle General "Mad Anthony" Wayne defeated a combined army of various tribes led by Chiefs Little Turtle, Turkey Foot, Blue Jacket and others. The monument is located in a park, 2 miles west of Maumee, Ohio.

The monument includes a 15 foot tall base topped by a bronze statue of General Wayne flanked by figures of a Native American scout and a frontiersman. Three bronze bas reliefs decorate the sides of the base.

The battle site was named "Fallen Timbers" because a tornado had knocked down a large number of trees there.

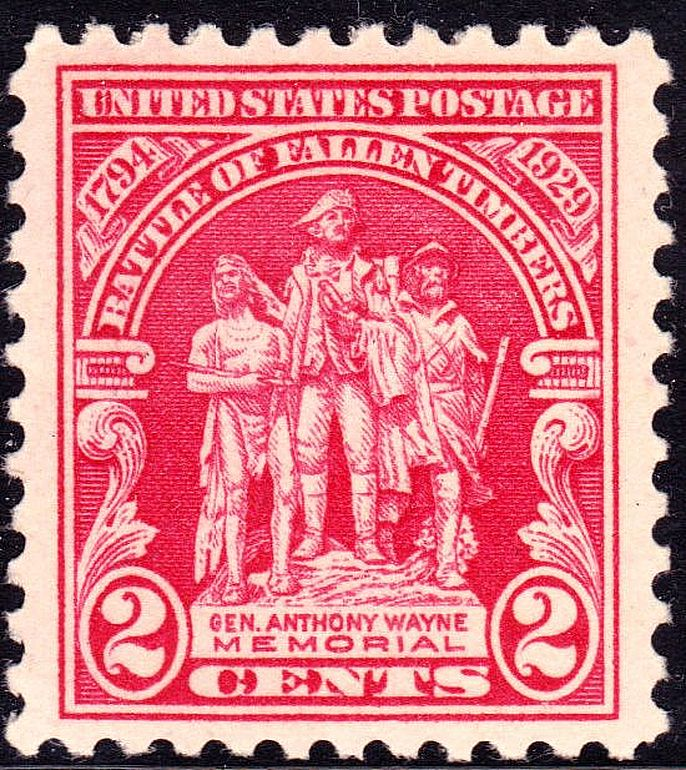

The United States Post Office Department issued a stamp in 1929 paying tribute to the American victory that featured the image of the monument on it.

The Fallen Timbers Battlefield was designated a National Historic Landmark in 1960. Subsequent discoveries by G. Michael Pratt in 1995 indicated the battlefield itself was not where first thought, down on the river floodplain, but rather above it and north of the monument. The Landmark designation was changed to reflect the discovery.

Meantime, the battlefield, monument, and the site of Fort Miamis to the east were collectively designated Fallen Timbers Battlefield and Fort Miamis National Historic Site in 1999, an affiliated unit of the National Park System managed by Toledo Metroparks, in partnership with the Ohio Historical Society. The site of Fort Miamis offers public access and some interpretation. Yet it is the Wayne Memorial that is the most prominent public commemoration of the site's three units.
