= Fort Miami (Ohio) =

- Fort Miamis Site
- U.S. National Register of Historic Places
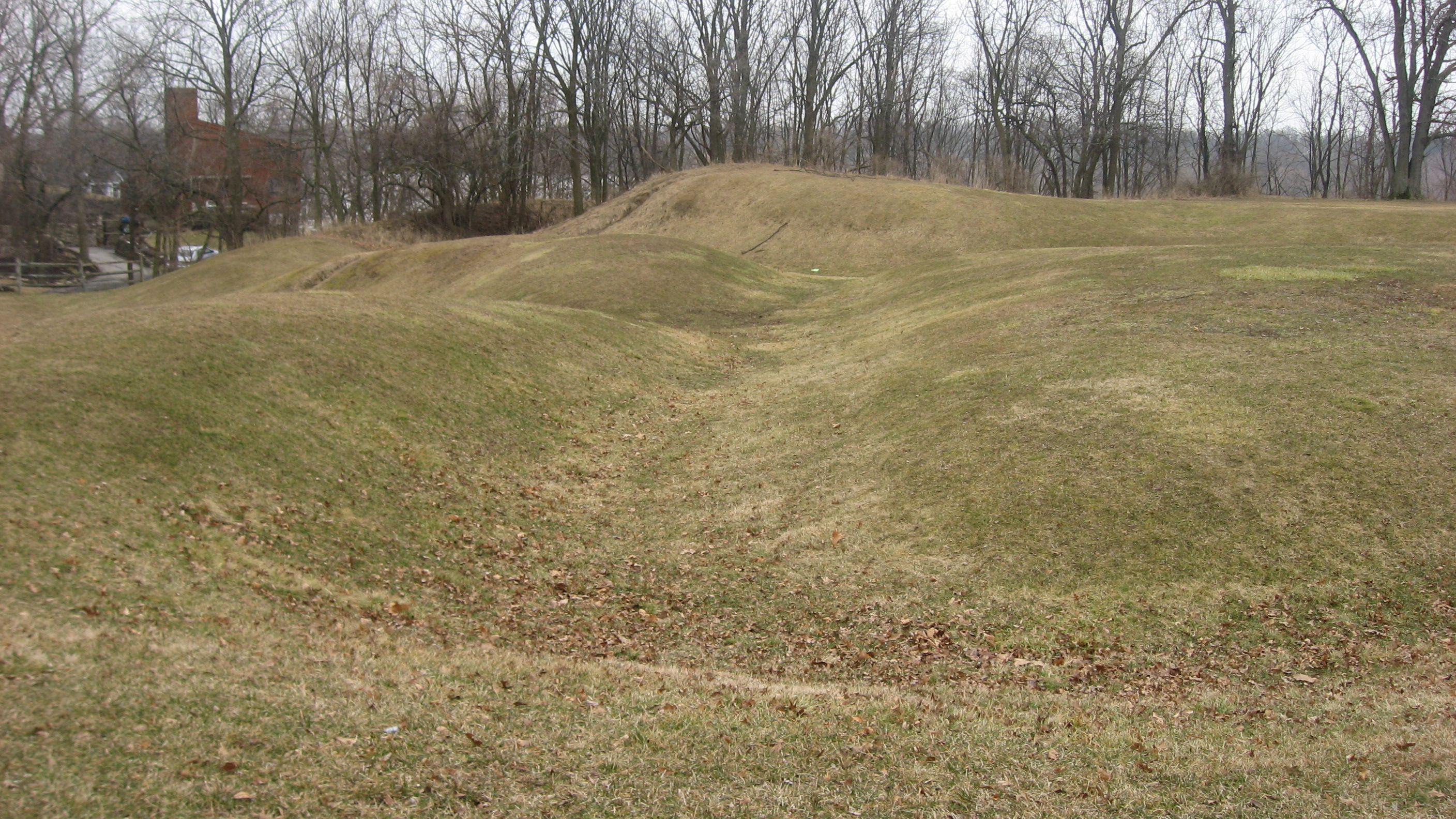
- Earthworks at the site

- Location within Ohio Location within the United States
- Location: Along the Maumee River in Maumee, Ohio
- Coordinates: 41°34′21″N 83°37′34″W
- Area: 3.7 acres (1.5 ha)
- Built: 1794
- NRHP reference No.: 75001466
- Added to NRHP: June 18, 1975

Fort Miami (Miamis) was a British fort built in spring 1794 on the Maumee River in what was at the time territory claimed by the United States, and designated by the federal government as the Northwest Territory. The fort was located at the eastern edge of present-day Maumee, Ohio, southwest of Toledo. The British built the fort to forestall a putative assault on Fort Detroit by Gen. "Mad" Anthony Wayne's army, then advancing northward in southwestern Ohio.

== Background ==
Under the terms of the 1783 Treaty of Paris that ended the American Revolutionary War, the region south of the Great Lakes and between the Ohio and Mississippi Rivers was assigned to the United States. However, the British refused to evacuate their forts in the region, citing the United States's refusal to comply with portions of the treaty which stated that pre-Revolutionary War debts owed to British subjects by Americans would be paid and Loyalist properties would no longer be confiscated by US authorities.

In the early 1790s, the Lieutenant Governor of Upper Canada, John Graves Simcoe, made an aggressive effort to aid the "Western Confederacy" of Native American tribes (the Shawnee, Miami, Wyandot, and others) in the Maumee and Wabash River watersheds in their ongoing war with American settlers. His ultimate goal was the establishment of an Indian barrier state in the region, as a way to protect Britain's North American fur trade ventures, and to block anticipated American attacks against British North America.

== Fort history ==
In spring 1794 the British built Fort Miami to forestall U.S. General Anthony Wayne's advance on Fort Detroit, and to encourage the confederated tribes in their war of resistance. The fort was a log stockade, which had four bastions, each capable of mounting four cannon, a river battery, barracks, officers' quarters, supply buildings, and various shops. A defensive ditch, 20 to 25 feet deep, ran along the land side of the fort.

In July 1794 General Wayne and his troops marched northward toward Fort Miami from Fort Recovery. Just south of Fort Miami, encountering a barricade erected by the Native Americans and a small party of Canadian militia, he ordered a charge and dispersed his adversaries in the Battle of Fallen Timbers. The Native Americans fled to the fort, but its commander, Major William Campbell, refused to let them enter as he was unwilling to start a war with the United States. Beaten and disillusioned, the Native Americans dispersed and one year later their tribal elders gathered at Fort Greenville to negotiate with Wayne. The Treaty of Greenville opened most of the present State of Ohio and part of Indiana to United States settlement. In 1796, under the terms of the Jay Treaty (1794), the British abandoned Fort Miami – along with their other forts on American soil. Wayne occupied and garrisoned it, but about 1799 it was abandoned.

The British again occupied the site during the War of 1812, which at the time was opposite the American-held Fort Meigs. During the War, Tecumseh, the Shawnee chief, and British officials maintained headquarters at the fort, from where they moved against Gen. William Henry Harrison at Fort Meigs. Abandoned again in 1814, the fort was eventually demolished. Afterward, the site reverted to agricultural and, later, public park use.

== Present-day site ==
Today, the site of Fort Miami sits as a small enclave within a residential development. Nothing remains of the original structure except parts of the earthworks.

In 1942 several Ohio civic and patriotic organizations acquired a part of the fort site. In 1953 the Ohio State Archaeological and Historical Society conducted preliminary excavations, and in 1957 the Historical Society of Northwestern Ohio placed a marker at the site, which remains undeveloped. In 1975, the site of the fort was added to the National Register of Historic Places.

The site of the fort was incorporated with the Fallen Timbers Battlefield into Fallen Timbers Battlefield and Fort Miamis National Historic Site in 1999, under Pub. L. 106–164 (text) (PDF). The site is managed by the Metropolitan Park District of the Toledo Area (Metroparks), in partnership with the Ohio Historical Society, and is an affiliated area of the National Park System.

A state memorial has been created at the site. Ft. Miami Elementary School of the Maumee City School District is five blocks away and named after the fort.

== Gallery ==
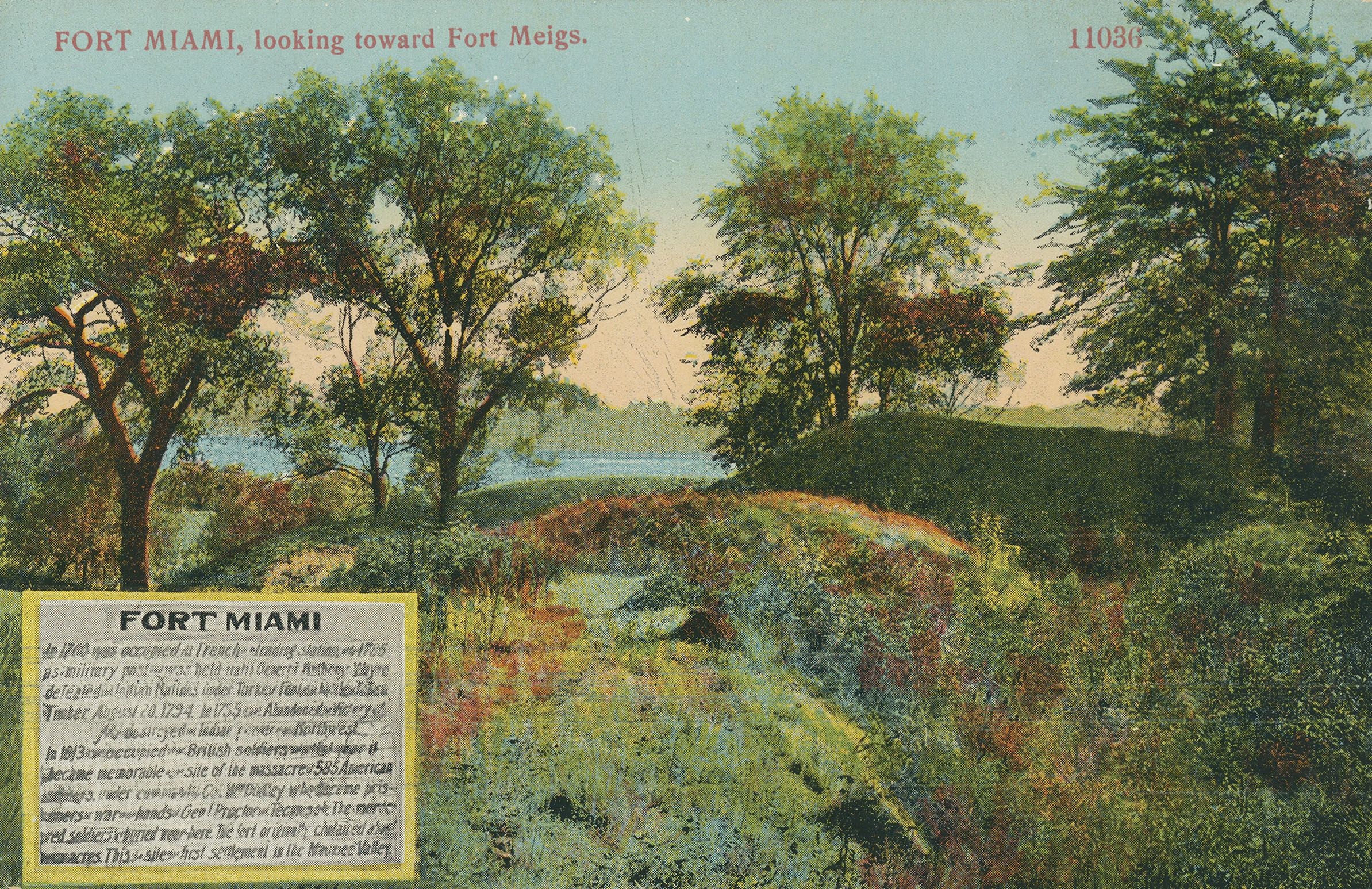
Fort Miami, looking toward Fort Meigs, Maumee, Ohio

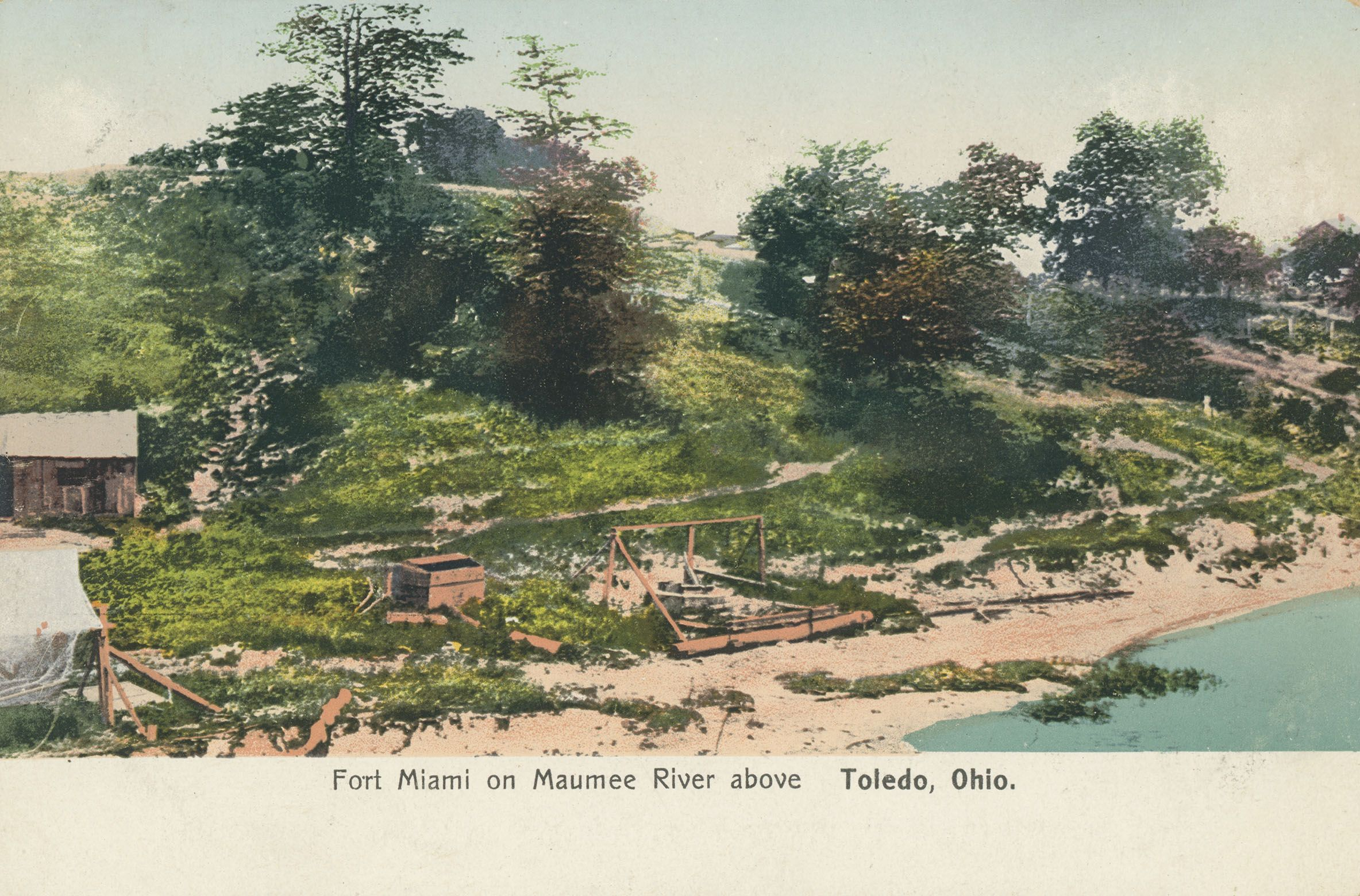
Fort Miami on the Maumee River above Toledo, Ohio

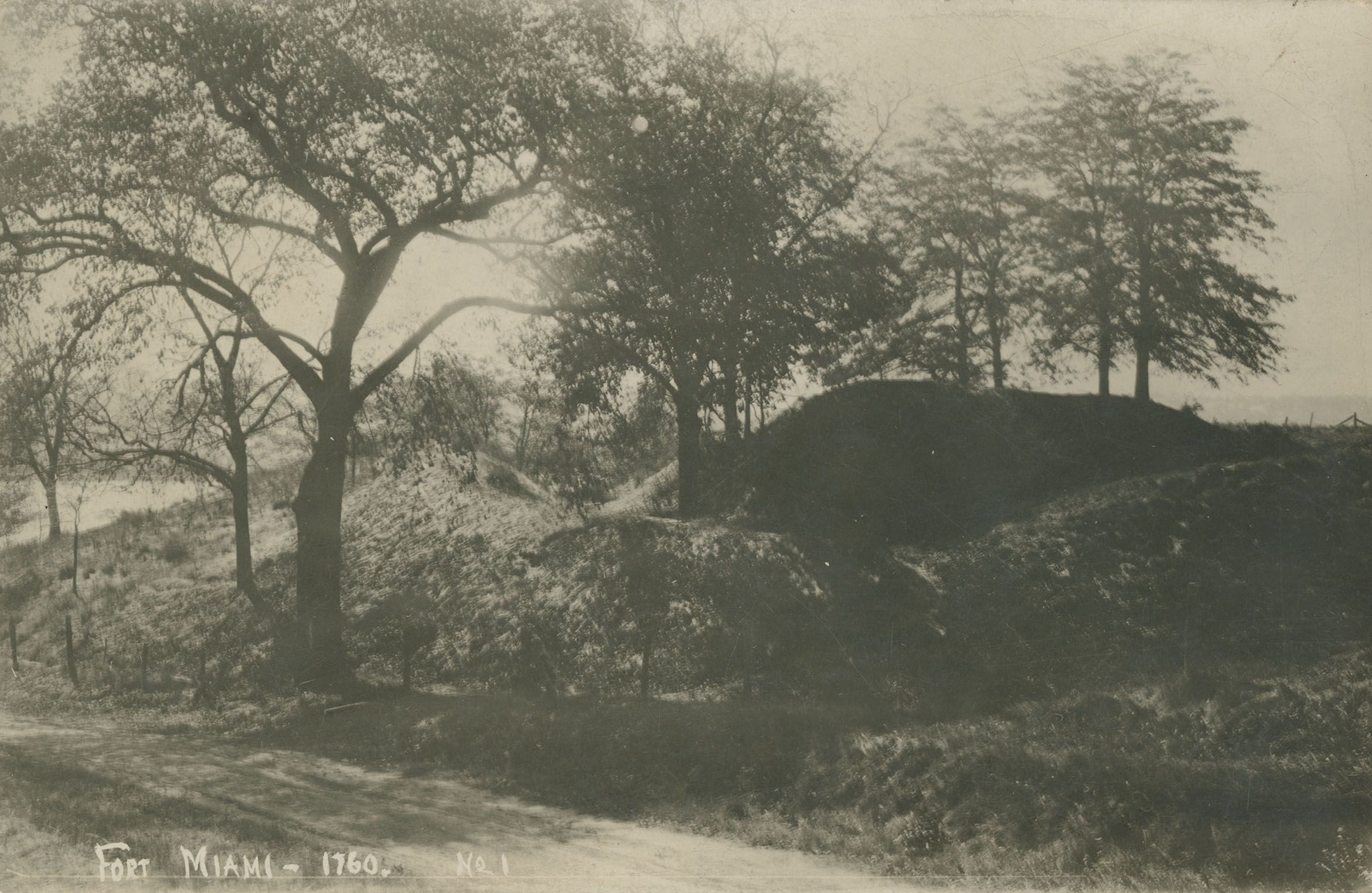
Fort Miami, Maumee, Ohio
