= Bruce Saville (sculptor) =

American sculptor (1893–1939)

Bruce Wilder Saville (March 16, 1893 – February 27, 1939) was an American sculptor born in Quincy, Massachusetts, and known for his monuments.

== Early years ==
He began his art studies at the Boston Art Normal School, where he studied with Cyrus Dallin. He later worked in the studio of Theo Alice Ruggles Kitson and Henry Hudson Kitson.

During World War I Saville joined the French Ambulance Corps for a year and then transferred to the U.S. Army Corps of Engineers for the remainder of the war. Following the end of the war he remained in Europe where he, "studied under European masters."

== Later career ==
After working there for four years in the Kitson's studio Saville moved to Columbus, Ohio, where he taught sculpture at Ohio State University, and at the Columbus Art School during the 1920s.

By 1930 he moved to Santa Fe, New Mexico, where he resided and worked until his death there in 1939. Many of his works can be found in the New Mexico Museum of Art.

He is the author of several World War I memorials as well as two Civil War memorials to Jonathan Richmond and Stephen G. Hicks, both located at Vicksburg National Military Park in Vicksburg, Mississippi.

Saville was a member of the National Sculpture Society.

== Selected works ==
- Peace, Ohio Statehouse, 1922
- Until the Dawn, White Chapel Memorial Cemetery, Troy, Michigan 1928
- Battle of Fallen Timbers Monument, Maumee, Ohio, 1929
- Doughboy Memorial, Quincy, Massachusetts
- Victorious Soldier, Sullivant Hall, Ohio State University, Columbus, Ohio
- Victory and Peace Monument, Glens Falls, New York 1927
- Lebanon War Memorial, Lebanon, Connecticut, 1922
- The Canadian Doughboy, Saint John, Halifax, Nova Scotia, Canada, 1921
- The Three Wars, Palmyra, Maine
