= Fallen Timbers Battlefield =

- U.S. National Register of Historic Places
- U.S. National Historic Site
- U.S. National Historic Landmark
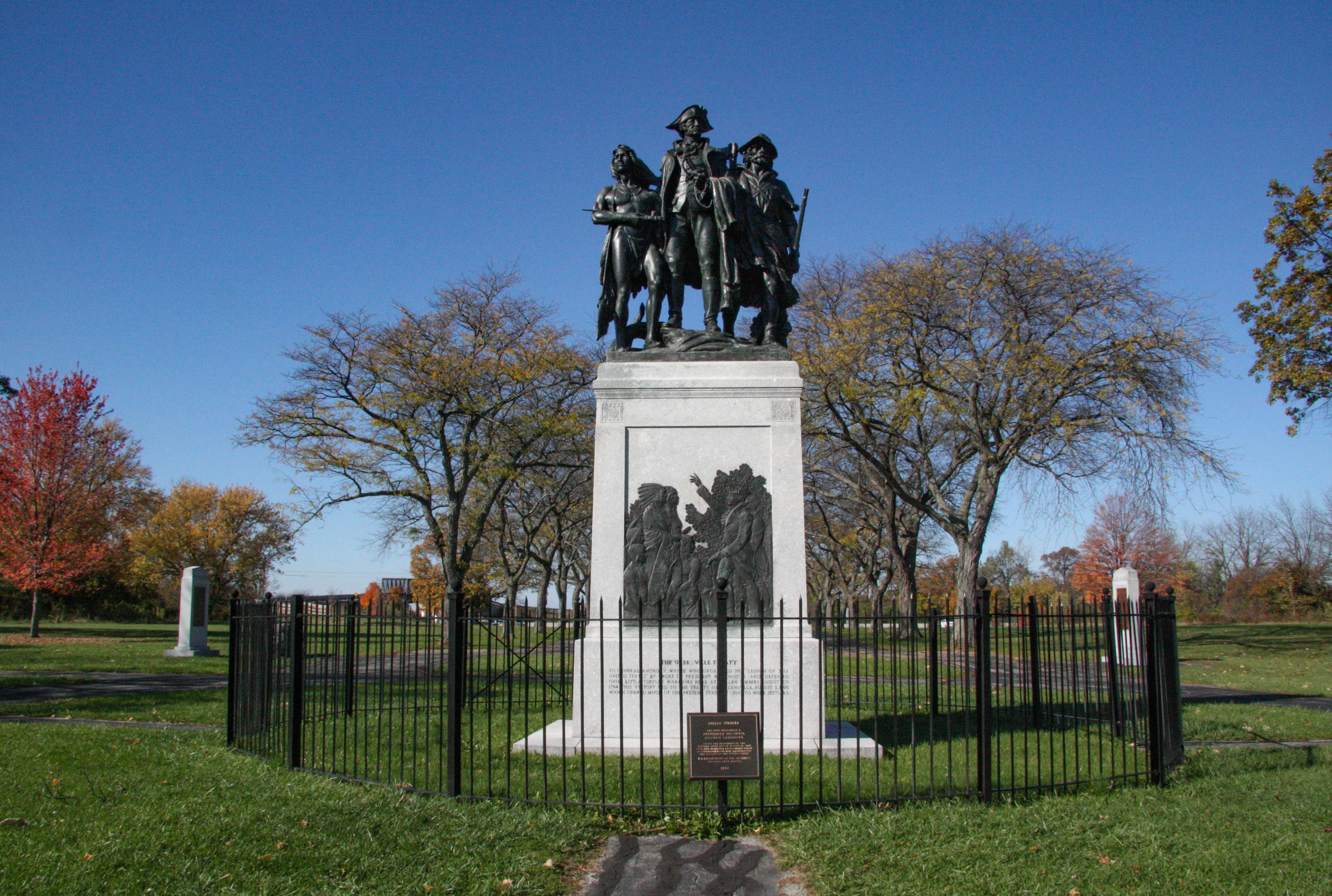
- A statue commemorating the battle

- Location within Ohio Location within the United States
- Location: Maumee, Ohio
- Coordinates: 41°32′39″N 83°41′51″W
- Area: 9 acres (3.6 ha) (landmarked area)
- Built: 1794
- Website: Fallen Timbers Battlefield and Fort Miamis National Historic Site
- NRHP reference No.: 66000616

Significant dates
- Added to NRHP: October 15, 1966
- Designated NHS: December 9, 1999
- Designated NHL: October 9, 1960

The Fallen Timbers Battlefield was the site of the Battle of Fallen Timbers on 20 August 1794. The battle, a decisive American victory over Native American and British opponents, effectively ended the Northwest Indian War, securing the Old Northwest for settlement. An area believed to be the battle site, located in Maumee, Ohio, was declared a National Historic Landmark in 1960. That site, now the Fallen Timbers State Memorial, is about 0.25 miles (0.40 km) south of the actual battlefield, which was identified in 1995, and much of which is now preserved as part of the Fallen Timbers Battlefield and Fort Miamis National Historic Site along with Fort Miami. The National Historic Site was established in 1999 as a partnership between the National Park Service, Metroparks Toledo, and the Ohio History Connection.

== Setting ==
The battlefield site is a parcel 187 acres (76 ha) in size, located in southwestern Maumee, bounded by Interstate 475 to the east, United States Route 24 to the south, Jerome Road to the west, and a railroad right of way south of Monclova Road to the north. Most of the area is relatively flat and open, except for the central area, which is a heavily wooded ravine that was a major feature of the terrain that influenced the course of the battle.

The site was relatively undisturbed for most of its time after the battle, seeing logging and some agricultural activity. The ravine was apparently left undisturbed due to the difficulty of its terrain. The battlefield area was identified by an archaeological survey in 1995, and further investigation in 2001 identified the locations of the battle lines and other features.

== State Memorial ==
The state memorial is located south of the national historic site, between US 24 and the Maumee River. It is 9 acres (3.6 ha) in size, set on high ground overlooking the river valley. The principal features of the site are three commemorative items: the Battle of Fallen Timbers Monument, installed in 1929, a plaque listing the United States Army soldiers who fought in the battle, and Turkey Foot Rock. The latter is a boulder on which a turkey foot has been carved, supposedly marking the place where Ottawa chief Turkey Foot was slain. It has been moved from its original location at the base of Presque Isle Hill, two miles south of Maumee City and four miles south of the site of Fort Miamis. From what we now know about the location of the battle, that location was not within the battlefield.

Although this site was designated a National Historic Landmark in 1960, an updated landmark nomination is being prepared to correct the boundaries to include the actual battlefield site.

== See also ==
- List of National Historic Landmarks in Ohio
- National Register of Historic Places listings in Lucas County, Ohio

== Gallery ==
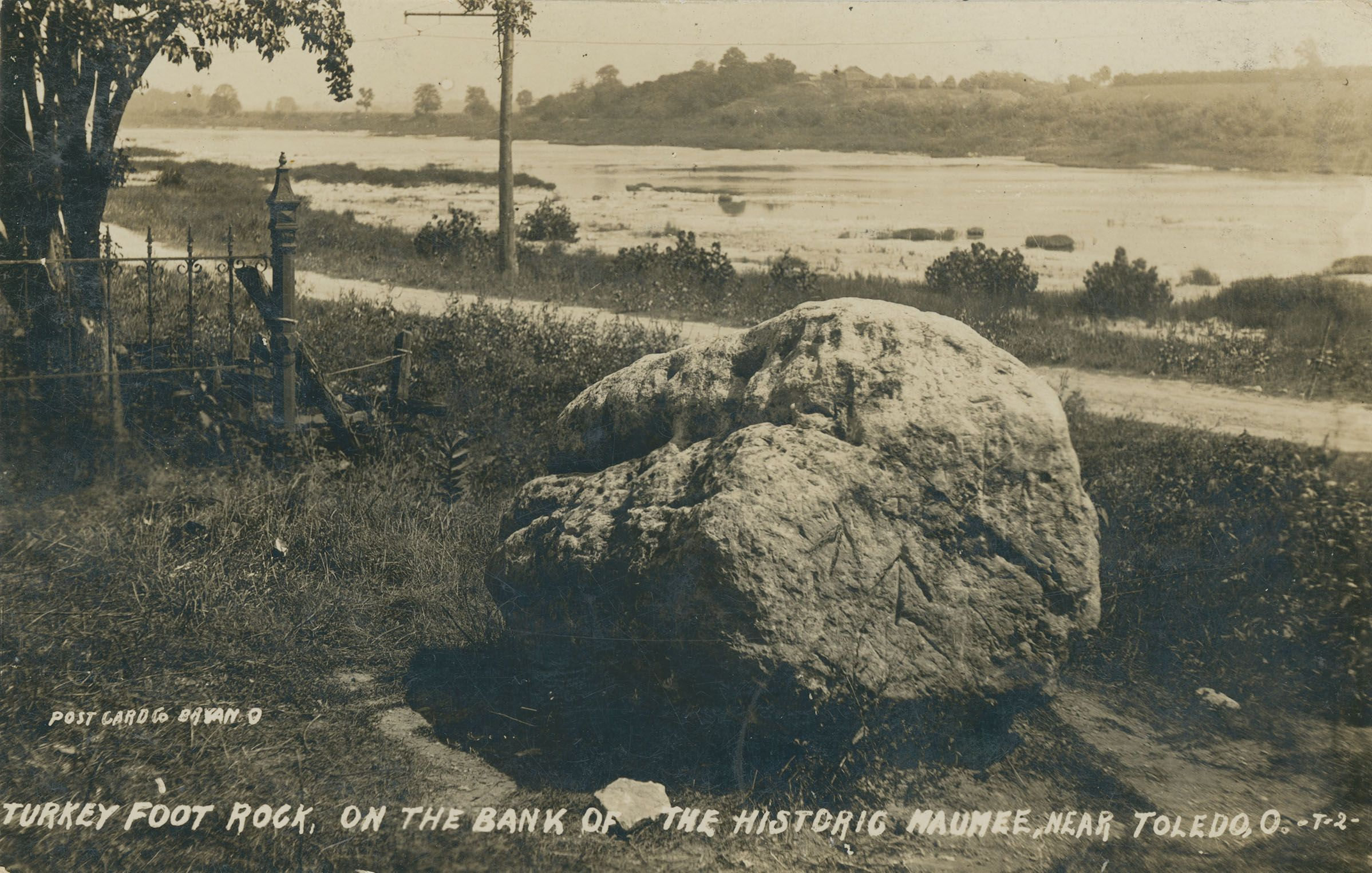
Turkey Foot Rock, at Fallen Timbers Battlefield

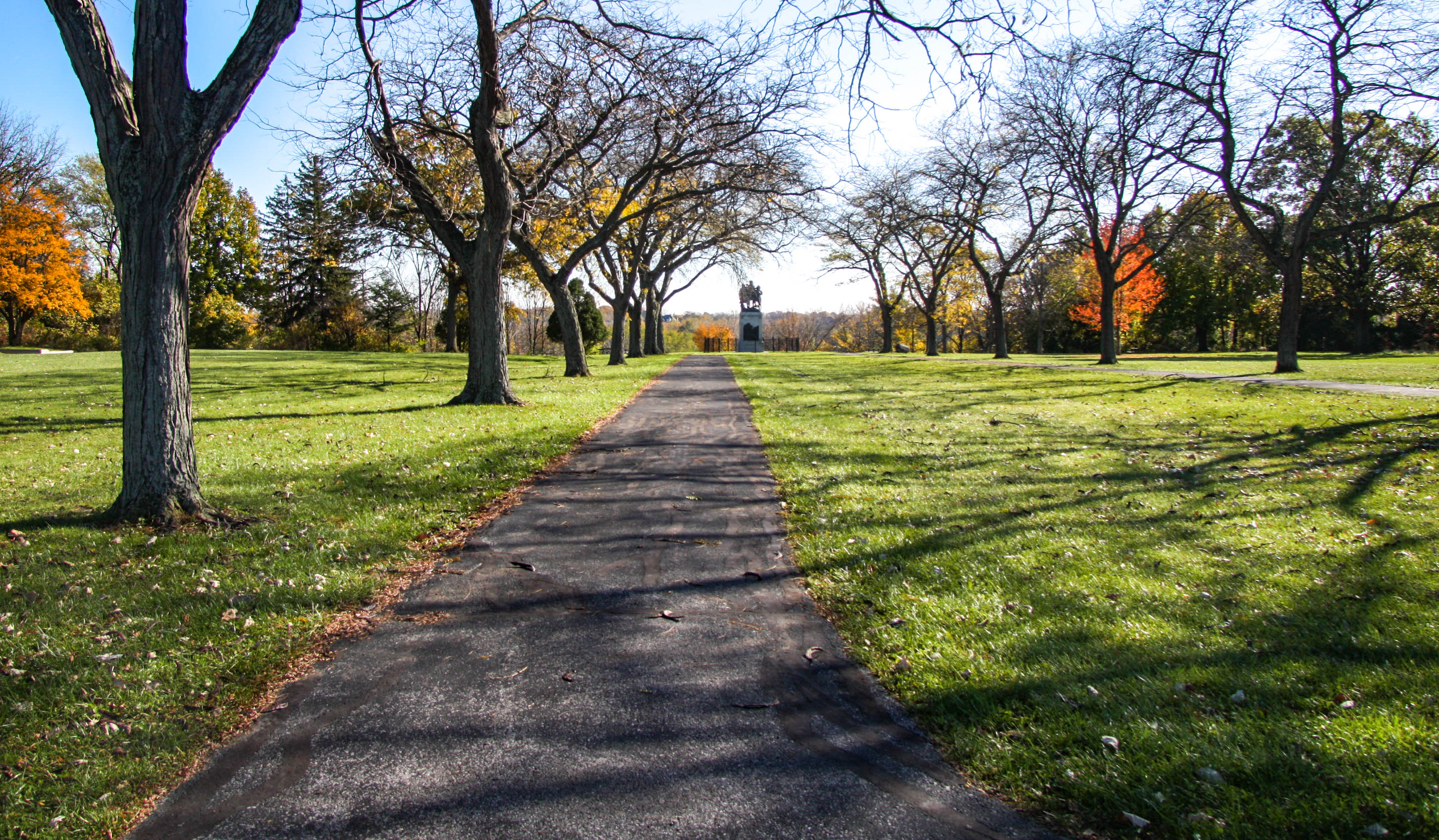
A path at Fallen Timbers Battlefield

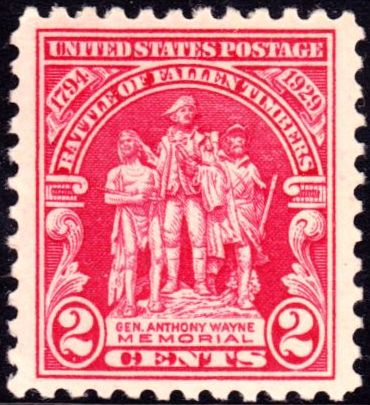
Stamp Commemorating the Battle of Fallen Timbers

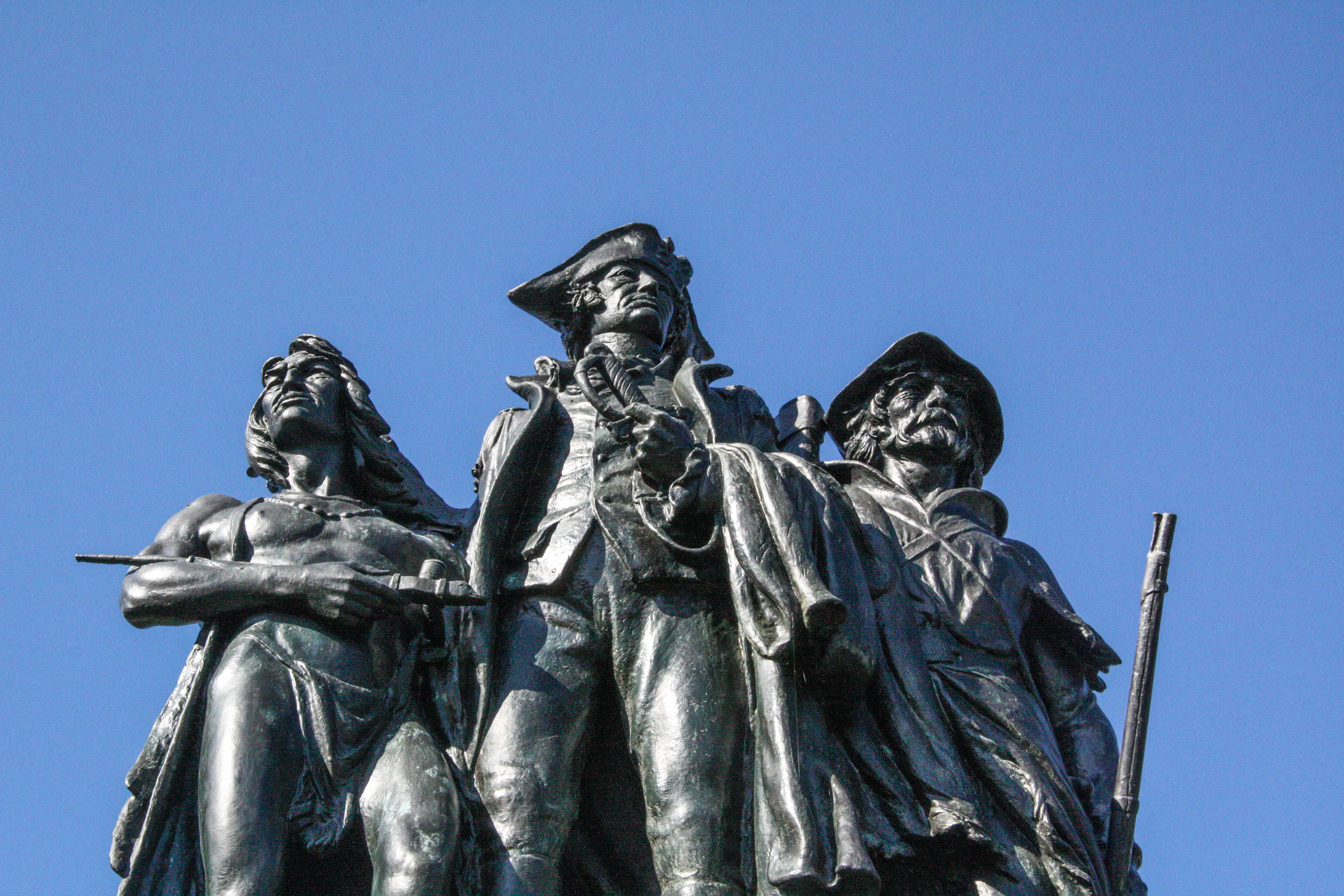
Statue and memorial to Fallen Timbers Battlefield

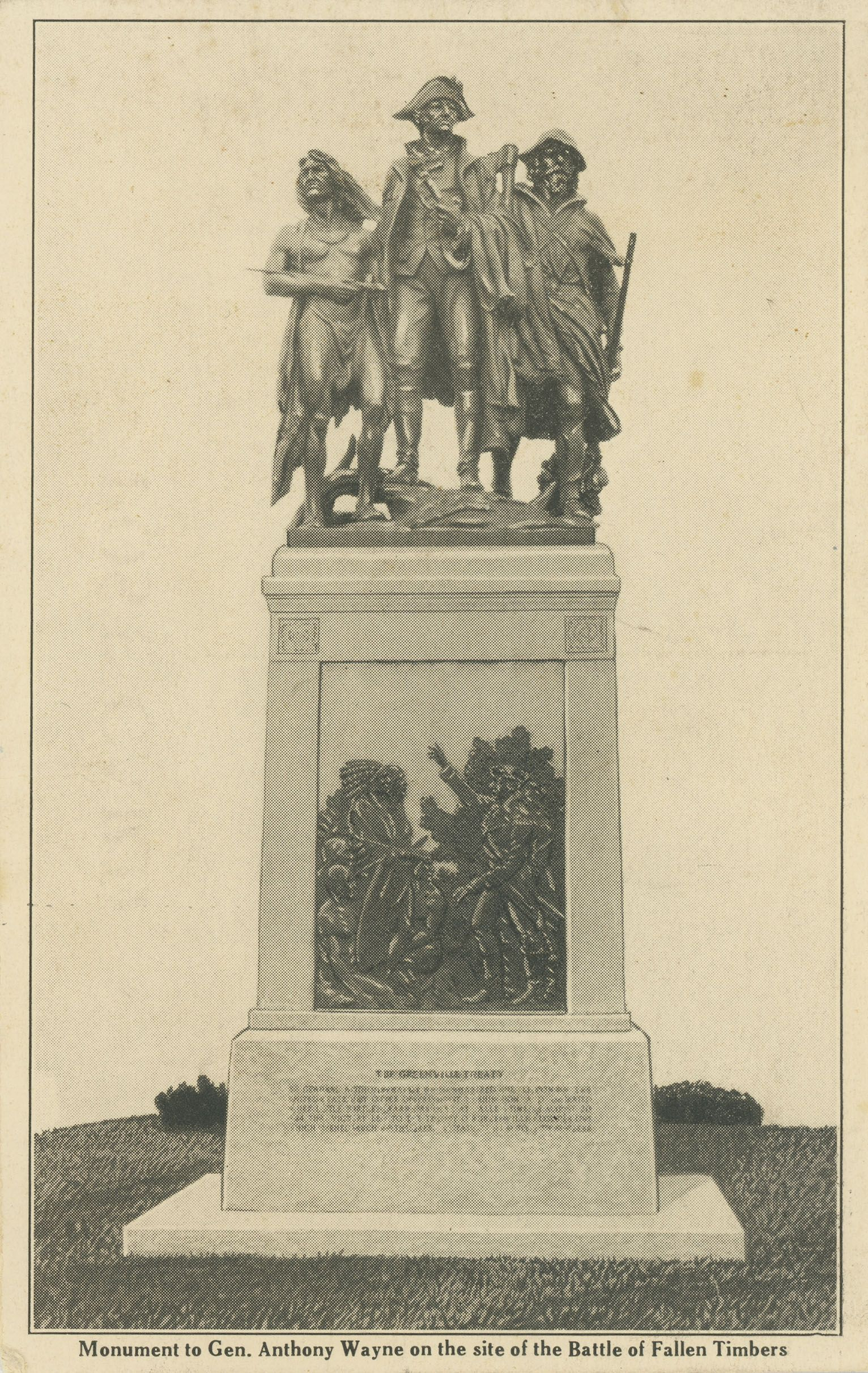
Historic postcard of the monument to General Anthony Wayne
