= Dick Kazmaier =

American football player (1930–2013)

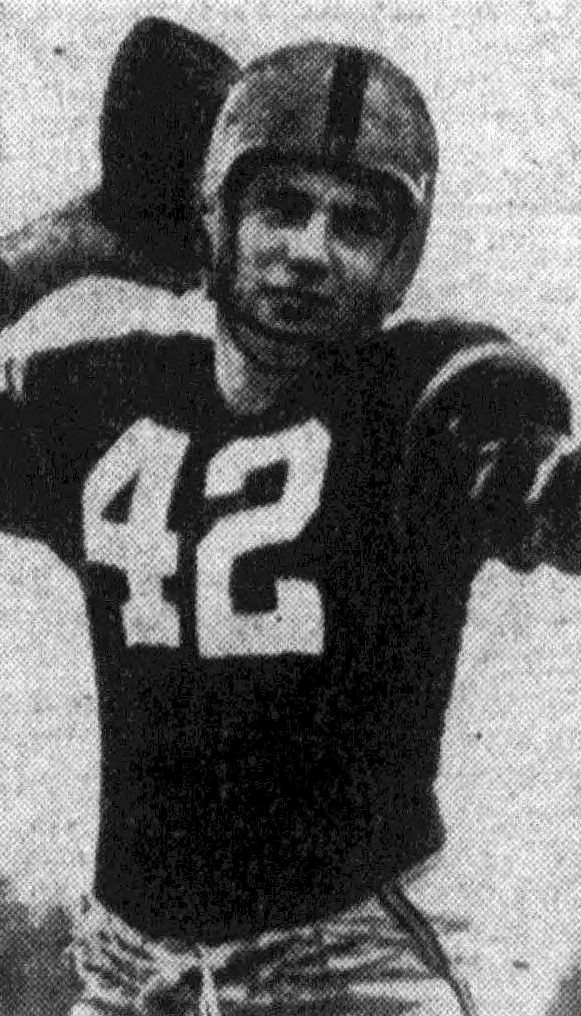
- Kazmaier, c. 1951

No. 42
- Position: Halfback

Personal information
- Born: November 23, 1930; Maumee, Ohio, U.S.
- Died: August 1, 2013 (aged 82); Boston, Massachusetts, U.S.
- Listed height: 5 ft 11 in (1.80 m)
- Listed weight: 171 lb (78 kg)

Career information
- High school: Maumee
- College: Princeton (1949–1951)

Awards and highlights
- National champion (1950); 2× Eastern champion (1950, 1951); Heisman Trophy (1951); Maxwell Award (1951); AP Male Athlete of the Year (1951); UPI Player of the Year (1951); SN Player of the Year (1951); Unanimous All-American (1951); First-team All-American (1950); 2× First-team All-Eastern (1950, 1951)
- College Football Hall of Fame (Class of 1966)

Richard William Kazmaier Jr. (November 23, 1930 – August 1, 2013) was an American businessman and naval lieutenant. He played college football as a halfback for the Princeton Tigers from 1949 through 1951 and was the winner of the 1951 Heisman Trophy, the Maxwell Award, and the AP Male Athlete of the Year.

== Early life, family and education ==
Kazmaier was born November 23, 1930, in Maumee, Ohio, the only child of Richard William Kazmaier Sr. (1903–1989) and Marian A. Kazmaier (née Greenlese; 1903–1957). At Maumee High School, he played football (four years), basketball (four years), track and field (four years), baseball (four years) and golf (one year), earning a letter each year in each sport. He graduated high school in 1948. He was recruited by 23 colleges, most offering full scholarships.

Kazmaier graduated with a degree in psychology from Princeton in 1952 after completing a senior thesis, "The Company and the Union: A Case Study". The Chicago Bears selected him in the 1952 NFL draft, but he declined to play professional football, instead going to Harvard Business School.

He spent three years in the U.S. Navy (1955–1957), attaining the rank of lieutenant.

== College football ==
A halfback, kicker, and quarterback at Princeton University, Kazmaier ended his career third all-time in Tigers' history with over 4,000 yards of offense and 55 touchdowns.

As a senior in 1951, Kazmaier was a consensus All-American and won the Maxwell Award and the Heisman Trophy. He was named Ivy League Football Player of the Decade in 1960 and Time magazine ran his picture on its cover. He was the last Heisman Trophy winner to play for an Ivy League institution.

== Career ==
After his discharge from the navy, he worked in sports marketing and consulting, then founded Kazmaier Associates, an investment firm in Concord, Massachusetts.

Kazmaier served as a director of the American Red Cross, director of the Ladies Professional Golfers Association, trustee of Princeton University, director of the Knight Foundation on Intercollegiate Athletics, chairman of the President's Council on Fitness, Sports, and Nutrition under Presidents Ronald Reagan and George H. W. Bush and president of the National Football Foundation and Hall of Fame.

== Honors and awards ==
In addition to his Heisman, the NCAA gave him its Silver Anniversary Award. He also received the National Football Foundation Distinguished American Award.

In 2007, during a Maumee football game against Perrysburg, Kazmaier was honored by having his jersey number (#42) retired. Princeton retired his #42 for all sports in October 2008. He donated his Heisman Trophy to Maumee High School, where it is displayed inside a glass case in the main hallway. The stadium at Maumee High School is named in his honor.

== Personal ==
Kazmaier and his wife Patricia were married for 60 years. They had six daughters. Kazmaier's daughter, Patty Kazmaier-Sandt, was an All-Ivy member of the Princeton women's ice hockey team who died in 1990 at age 28 from a rare blood disease. Kazmaier established the Patty Kazmaier Award to memorialize his daughter. It is given to the top woman US college ice hockey player at the annual Women's Frozen Four NCAA championship.

Kazmaier died on August 1, 2013, in Boston from heart and lung disease at the age of 82.

== Honors ==
- 1950–1951: All-American in football
- 1951: Heisman Trophy winner
- 1951: Maxwell Award winner
- 1951: Named outstanding college football player by the Los Angeles Times, the Detroit Times, and the Cleveland Touchdown Club
- 1951: Associated Press Male Athlete of the Year
- 1951: Philadelphia Sports Writers Association Athlete of the Year
- 1960: Ivy League Football Player of the Decade
- 1962: Voted to the Greater Toledo Athletic Hall of Fame
- 1969: Sports Illustrated's 1950s All Decade Team
- 1989: Walter Camp Distinguished American Award recipient
- 1993: National Football Foundation's Distinguished American Award in 1993
- 1998: Maumee High School renamed its football stadium in his honor.
- 2007: Jersey number (#21) officially retired at Maumee High School in Kazmaier's honor.
- 2008: Jersey number (#42) officially retired at Princeton University in Kazmaier's (and Bill Bradley's) honor. Bradley had grown up as a fan of Kazmaier and chose the number 42 in his honor.

== See also ==
- List of NCAA major college football yearly passing leaders
- List of NCAA major college football yearly total offense leaders
