= Maumee High School (Ohio) =

Public, coeducational high school in Maumee, Ohio, United States

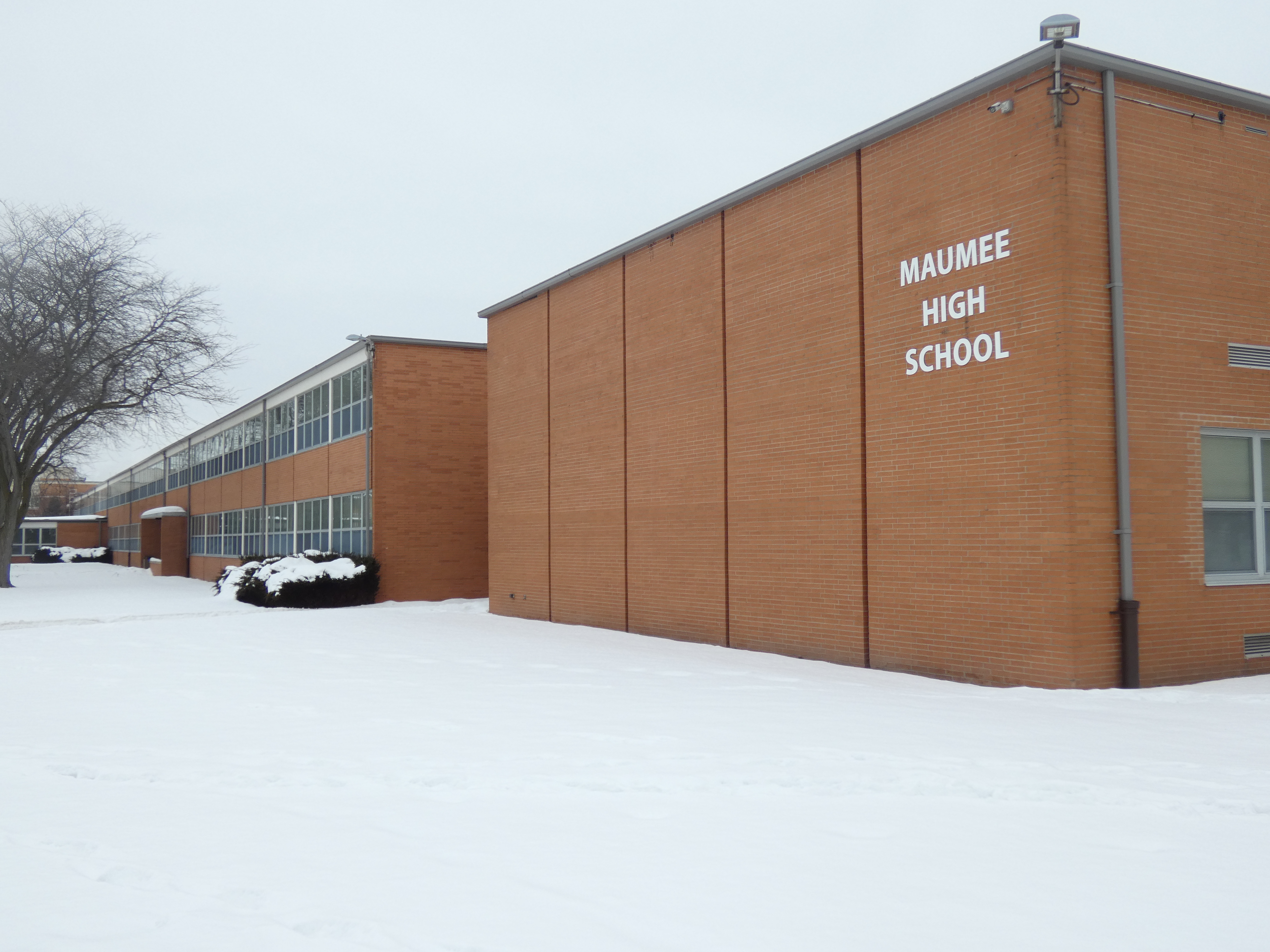

Location
- 1147 Saco Street; Maumee, (Lucas County), Ohio 43537; United States; 41°34′39″N 83°38′25″W

Information
- Type: Public, Coeducational high school
- School district: Maumee City Schools
- Superintendent: Todd Cramer
- Dean: Gretchen Brown
- Principal: Cori Wagner
- Teaching staff: 47.00 (FTE)
- Grades: 9-12
- Student to teacher ratio: 13.55
- Colors: Purple and Gold
- Athletics conference: Northern Buckeye Conference
- Team name: Panthers
- Accreditation: North Central Association of Colleges and Schools
- Athletic Director: Cameron Coutcher
- Website: maumee.k12.oh.us/schools/maumee_high_school/index.php

Maumee High School is a public high school in Maumee, Ohio, southwest of Toledo. It is the only high school in the Maumee City School District. Their mascot and sports teams are known as the "Maumee Panthers". They are members of the Northern Buckeye Conference and their rivals are the Anthony Wayne Generals and former historic rival being Perrysburg Yellow Jackets

Maumee High School is one of only four high schools that have a Heisman Trophy on display, donated by alum Richard Kazmaier, who won it while at Princeton University.

== Notable alumni ==
- Michael Graves (fighter), professional MMA fighter currently with Titan Fc
- Robert Knepper, actor (who was on Prison Break on Fox)
- Richard Kazmaier, football player (1951 Heisman winner who gifted trophy to high school); namesake of school stadium
- Steve Mason, Southern California radio broadcaster
- Mike Jacobs, head coach of the Toledo Rockets
- Bellal Joseph, trauma surgeon for Gabby Giffords after her assassination attempt

== Richard Kazmaier Stadium ==
Richard Kazmaier Stadium is on the north side of the Maumee High School campus. In addition to football, track, and soccer, it hosts marching band, drum, and drumline competitions.

== Maumee Performing Arts Center at Maumee High School ==
Thanks to donations from local businesses (Ed Schmidt Auto Group, Maison-Dardenne-Walker Funeral Home, the Andersons, the Buehrer Group, Fifth Third Bank, St. Luke's Hospital, and the Maumee Rotary Foundation), a long-awaited theater was completed on the school campus. Prior to its construction, Maumee High was one of few in the region without a theater. Instead, productions commenced at other venues or Gateway Middle School, one mile away. They have recently performed such plays as Take Her, She's Mine, My Fair Lady, The Servant of Two Masters, Guys and Dolls, Alice in Wonderland, and The Wizard of Oz.

The Maumee Performing Arts Center at Maumee High School also served as temporary host to the Toledo Opera, Toledo Ballet, and others from late November 2007 through March 2008, after a fire closed the Valentine Theater.
