= Battle of Fallen Timbers =

1794 decisive battle of the Northwest Indian War in present-day Ohio

Coordinates: 41°32′39″N 83°41′51″W

- Part of the Northwest Indian War
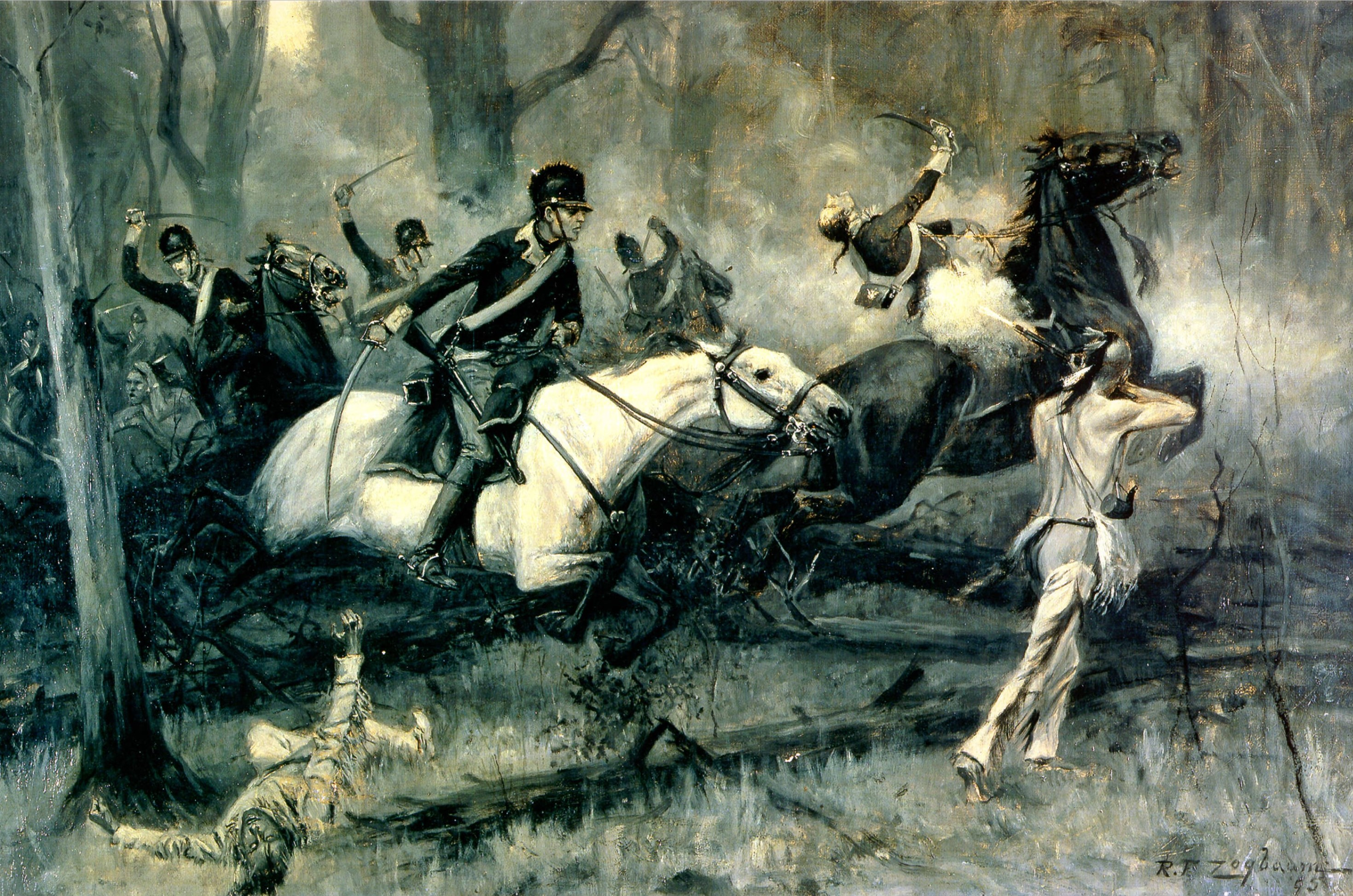
- 1895 illustration of the battle
Date	20 August 1794
Location	Northwest Territory (near present-day Maumee, Ohio)
Result	United States victory: Treaty of Greenville

Belligerents
United States	Northwestern Confederacy (Kingdom of Great Britain) Lower Canada

Commanders and leaders
Anthony Wayne; James Wilkinson; Jean Hamtramck; Charles Scott	Blue Jacket; Egushawa; Little Turtle; Buckongahelas (Kingdom of Great Britain) William Caldwell

Strength
3,000	1,300

Casualties and losses
33 killed 100 wounded	25–40 killed (Note: Gaff, Bayonets in the Wilderness, gives the claim of 30–40 bodies found as well as McKee's figure of 19 killed.)
- Location within Ohio

The Battle of Fallen Timbers (20 August 1794) was the final battle of the Northwest Indian War, a struggle between the Northwestern Confederacy and United States for control of the Northwest Territory. The battle took place amid trees toppled by a tornado near the Maumee River in northwestern Ohio at the site of the present-day city of Maumee, Ohio.

Major General Anthony Wayne's Legion of the United States, supported by General Charles Scott's Kentucky militia, were victorious against a combined Native American force of Shawnee under Blue Jacket, Ottawas under Egushawa, and many others. The battle was brief, lasting little more than one hour, but it scattered the confederated Native American forces.

The U.S. victory ended major hostilities in the region. The following Treaty of Greenville and Jay Treaty forced Native American displacement from most of modern-day Ohio, opening it to White American settlement, along with withdrawal of the British presence from the southern Great Lakes region of the United States.

== Prelude ==
In the 1783 Treaty of Paris, which ended the American Revolutionary War, Great Britain ceded rights to the region northwest of the Ohio River and south of the Great Lakes. Despite the treaty, which ceded the Northwest Territory to the United States, the British maintained a military presence in their forts there and continued policies that supported the Native Americans to slow American expansion. With the encroachment of European-American settlers west of the Appalachians after the War, a Huron-led confederacy formed in 1785 to resist the usurpation of Indian lands, declaring that lands north and west of the Ohio River were Indian territory. The young United States formally organized the region in the Land Ordinance of 1785 and negotiated treaties allowing settlement, but the Western Confederacy of Native American nations were not party to these treaties and refused to acknowledge them. Violence erupted in the area between Native Americans and U.S. settlers in the region and in Kentucky.

In George Washington's first term as President of the United States, the U.S. launched two major campaigns to subdue the Western Confederacy and protect American colonizers from Indian attacks. The Harmar campaign in 1790 resulted in a significant victory for the confederacy and a U.S. retreat to Fort Washington. In May 1791, Lieutenant Colonel James Wilkinson launched what he thought was a clever raid at the Battle of Kenapacomaqua, Wilkinson killed nine Wea and Miami, and captured 34 Miami as prisoners, including a daughter of Miami war chief Little Turtle. Many of the confederation leaders were considering terms of peace to present to the United States, but when they received news of Wilkinson's raid, they readied for war. Wilkinson's raid thus had the opposite effect, uniting the tribes against St. Clair. In 1791, a follow-up campaign was led by territorial governor Arthur St. Clair, which was decimated by combined native forces.

Following this devastating defeat, the area was now open to attacks from the British and their allied native tribes in the west. The U.S. quickly appointed envoys to negotiate peace with the Confederacy. Meanwhile, President Washington commissioned Major General "Mad" Anthony Wayne to recruit and train a more effective and larger force. If peace negotiations failed, Wayne was to bring U.S. sovereignty to the new borders. Wayne commanded about 2,000 men, with Kentuckian settler Joseph Bartholomew and allied Choctaw and Chickasaw men serving as his scouts. In the spring of 1793, Wayne moved the Legion from Pennsylvania downriver to Fort Washington, at a camp Wayne named Hobson's Choice because they had no other options.

When Wayne received news that a grand council of the confederacy had not reached a peace agreement with U.S. negotiators, he moved his army north into Indian held territory. In November, the Legion built a new fort north of Fort Jefferson, which Wayne named Fort Greeneville. The Legion wintered here, but Wayne dispatched a detachment of about 300 men on December 23rd to quickly build Fort Recovery on the site of St. Clair's defeat and recover the cannons lost there in 1791. In response, the British built Fort Miami to block Wayne's advance and to protect Fort Lernoult in Detroit. In January 1794, Wayne reported to Knox that eight companies and a detachment of artillery under Major Henry Burbeck had claimed St. Clair's battleground and had already built a small fort. By June, Fort Recovery had been reinforced, and the Legion had recovered four copper cannons (two six-pound and two three-pound), two copper howitzers, and one iron carronade. The fort was attacked that month, and although the Legion suffered heavy casualties, they maintained control of the fort, and the battle exposed divisions within the confederacy.

Before departing Fort Recovery, Wayne sent a final offer of peace with two captured prisoners to the leaders of the confederation at Roche de Bout. The confederacy leaders debated among themselves. Little Turtle declared Wayne as a "the Chief who never sleeps," and recommended that the confederation should negotiate peace with Wayne. Blue Jacket mocked Little Turtle as a traitor and convinced the others that Wayne would be defeated, just as Harmar and St. Clair had been. Little Turtle then relinquished leadership to Blue Jacket, stating that he would be only a follower. The perceived cracks in the united confederacy concerned the British, who sent reinforcements to Fort Miami on the Maumee River.

Wayne departed Fort Recovery on 17 August and pushed north, buttressed by about 1,000 mounted Kentucky militia under General Charles Scott. Native American scouts noted that the Legion only marched until early afternoon, then stopped to build a fortified encampment, making attack on camps less practical than in previous US campaigns. The Legion constructed Fort Adams and Fort Defiance, so named from a declaration by Charles Scott that "I defy the English, Indians, and all the devils of hell to take it." Finally, as the Legion approached Fort Miami, Wayne stopped to build Fort Deposit as a baggage camp so that the Legion could go into battle as light infantry.

== Battle ==
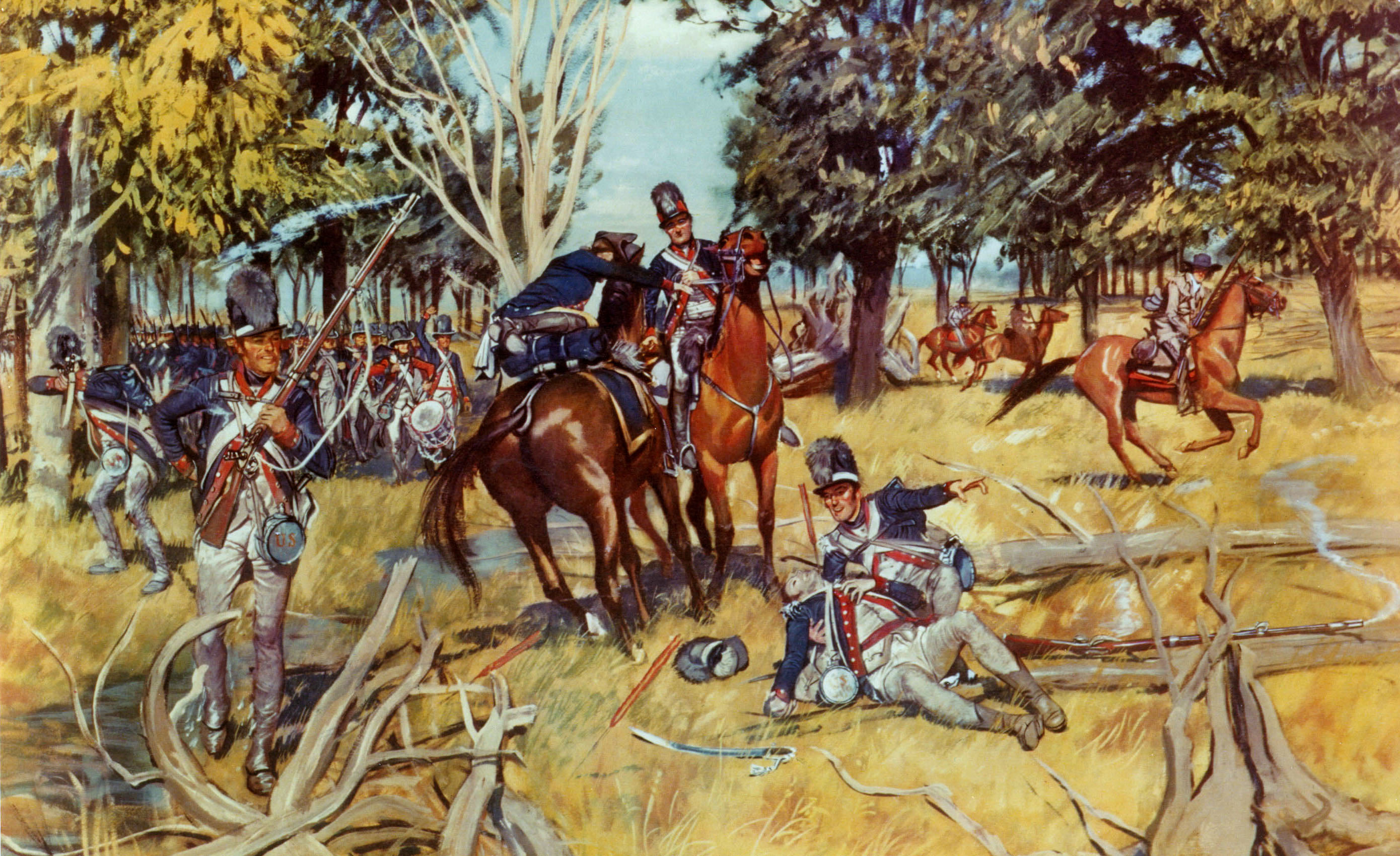
The Legion of the United States makes contact with the Western Confederacy on 20 August 1794.

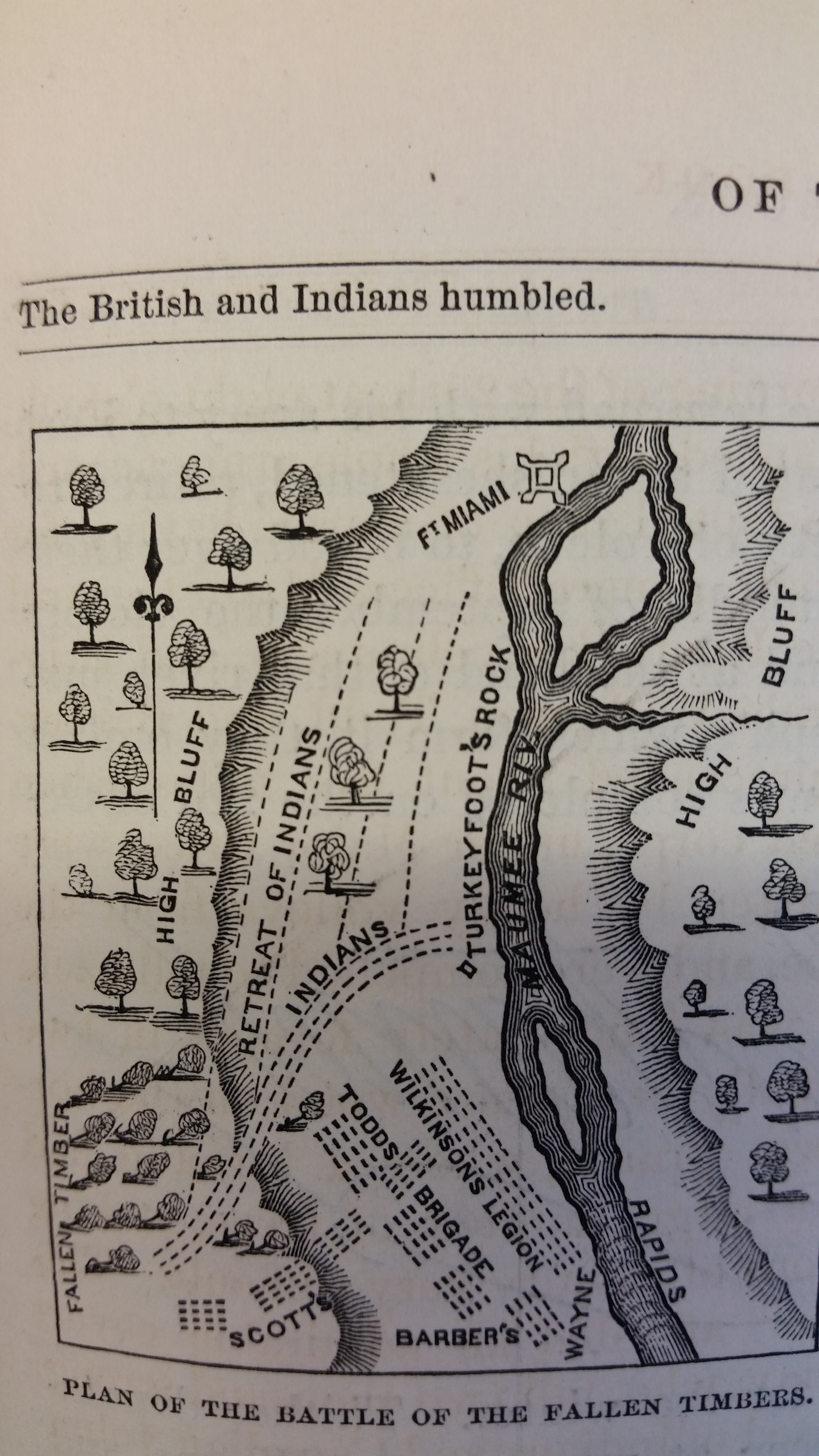
Fallen Timbers Battle

Captain William Wells, Little Turtle's son-in-law and the commander of Wayne's intelligence company, was wounded along with some of his spies after they were identified spying in a Native American camp the night of 11 August. The Choctaw and Chickasaw scouts left the Legion at Fort Defiance after seeing how sick Wayne had become on the campaign. Wayne therefore ordered Captain George Shrim, commander of the Legion's ranger detachment, to lead a party of mounted scouts. On 18 August, Native American forces captured one of the scouts, William May, from whom they learned that Wayne intended to attack on the 19th, unless he stopped to build a supply depot, in which case he would attack on the 20th. Alexander McKee urged the confederacy to choose a suitable battlefield, since they knew the date of the attack. Suspecting that Wayne would march along the Maumee River, Blue Jacket took a defensive position not far from present-day Toledo, Ohio, where a stand of trees (the "fallen timbers") had been blown down by a storm. The tangled debris stretched for nearly a mile, and the heavy brush created a natural abatis which would protect the confederate warriors. The Native American forces, numbering about 1,500, comprised Blue Jacket's Shawnees, Delawares led by Buckongahelas, Miamis led by Little Turtle, Wyandots led by Tarhe and Roundhead, Ojibwas, Odawa led by Egushawa, Potawatomi led by Little Otter, Mingos, a small detachment of Mohawks, and a company of Canadian militiamen dressed as Native Americans under Lieutenant-colonel William Caldwell. After taking their positions starting on 17–18 August, the Native forces fasted in preparation for battle.

Brigadier General Wilkinson urged Wayne to attack with haste before the native forces could assemble, but Wayne opted to fortify Fort Deposit. On the 19th, Wayne sent a battalion of mounted scouts under Major William Price to reconnoiter the area. They encountered a number of confederate positions, but no shots were fired. At the end of that day, a confederate council was held, and it was determined that as Wayne might prepare for battle for several days, their warriors would be given permission to eat the next morning.

The Legion advanced early the next morning, 20 August, while the Native Americans were on their 3rd day of fasting. Due to morning rains, many warriors in the confederacy assumed there would be no battle, and retired to Fort Miami to break their fast. Suspecting contact, Wayne ordered the Legion to march in compacted columns, and distributed the dragoons and artillery in the center of the column so that they could respond to an attack from any direction. A battalion of mounted Kentucky militia led the column, and had difficulty with the terrain. The lead scouts were only about 100 yards into the center of the chosen battlefield when the Odawas and Potawatomis under Little Otter and Egushawa fired their first volley, scattering the militia. Behind the militia were two companies of infantry from the 4th Sub-Legion under Captain John Cook, and he directed their initial volley at the Kentuckians, whom he considered to be fleeing the battle. Soon, however, Cook's detachment fled the scene as advancing warriors initiated hand-to-hand fighting.

The fleeing U.S. forces ran towards the left wing of the Legion's column, where Lieutenant-colonel Jean François Hamtramck commanded the 2nd and 4th sub-legions. They broke through Captain Howell Lewis' company, which fell back without firing a shot. Hamtramck, meanwhile, formed his wing into two ranks to halt the pursuing warriors, many of whom were armed with only tomahawks and knives, and General Wilkinson formed the 1st and 3rd sub-legions into one extended line covering 800 yards of the right wing. Wayne rushed to the sound of the muskets, and quickly deployed two light infantry companies from the center ahead of each wing, to halt any confederate advances until the lines could be properly formed. Artillery was brought to the front and blasted the Native American line with grapeshot. Blue Jacket's well-organized ambush was now in disarray, as the center elements had rushed forward while the wings had remained in position. When asked for orders by his aide-de-camp, Lieutenant William Henry Harrison, Wayne responded "Charge the damned rascals with the bayonet!"

Captain Robert Campbell charged first, leading his company of dragoons across 60–100 yards with sabres drawn. Nearly a dozen of the dragoons were shot in the attack, and Captain Campbell was killed. Wilkinson's dismounted infantry made a slow advance to support the dragoons, and the Odawas and Potawatomis ran and fled back to their positions. The pursuit was so lightly challenged that Wilkinson feared they were being led into a trap, and he paused to await instructions from Wayne.

Meanwhile, Hamtramck advanced at trail arms and encountered the Wyandots, Lenape, and Canadians. A heavy exchange of fire ensued, and the confederate forces attempted to flank the 4th sub-legion. Instead, a brigade of Kentucky militia under Brigadier General Robert Todd moved quickly through the swamp and flanked the Canadians. The 4th sub-legion pursued with fixed bayonets. The confederated forces retreated from their original positions, and were unable to effectively re-form in the rough terrain.

Wilkinson eventually resumed a cautious advance along the ridge high above the Maumee River. On route to Fort Miami, the Native forces had to cross a ravine. The Odawa and Potawatomi attempted to regroup here. Egushawa was in command, but was wounded when he was shot through the eye. Little Otter was severely wounded, and was thrown on the back of a white horse and evacuated so he could not be captured by the Legion. Another Odawa chief, Turkey Foot, stood atop a large rock and urged the warriors to make their stand, but he was shot in the chest and died almost instantly. According to Alexander McKee, the loss of so many confederate leaders made the Native American losses seem greater than they actually were, and many warriors fled to Fort Miami.

Beyond the ravine, the landscape was much more open, allowing the Legion to advance more quickly and giving dragoons a frightening advantage over dismounted warriors. McKee, Matthew Elliot, and Simon Girty tried to rally the retreating forces one last time, but they were largely ignored. The retreat became a disorganized rout, except for the rear guard protection provided by the Canadians and Wyandots.

The entire battle lasted an hour and ten minutes. The Indian warriors fled towards Fort Miami but were surprised to find the gates closed against them. Major William Campbell, the commander of Fort Miami, had closed the gates when the first warriors arrived and the sounds of musket fire came closer. He refused to open the gates now and give refuge to the Indian warriors, unwilling to start a war with the United States. The remnants of the Indian army continued north and reunited near Swan Creek, where their families were encamped. McKee tried to rally them once more, but they refused to fight again, especially after Campbell's refusal to let them into Fort Miami.

Wayne's army had lost 33 men and had about 100 wounded. They reported that they had found 30–40 dead warriors. Alexander McKee, an official of the British Indian Department, reported that the Indian confederacy lost 19 warriors killed, including Chief Turkey Foot of the Ottawa. Six white men fighting on the Native American side were also killed, and Chiefs Egushawa and Little Otter of the Ottawa were wounded.

=== Post hoc ===
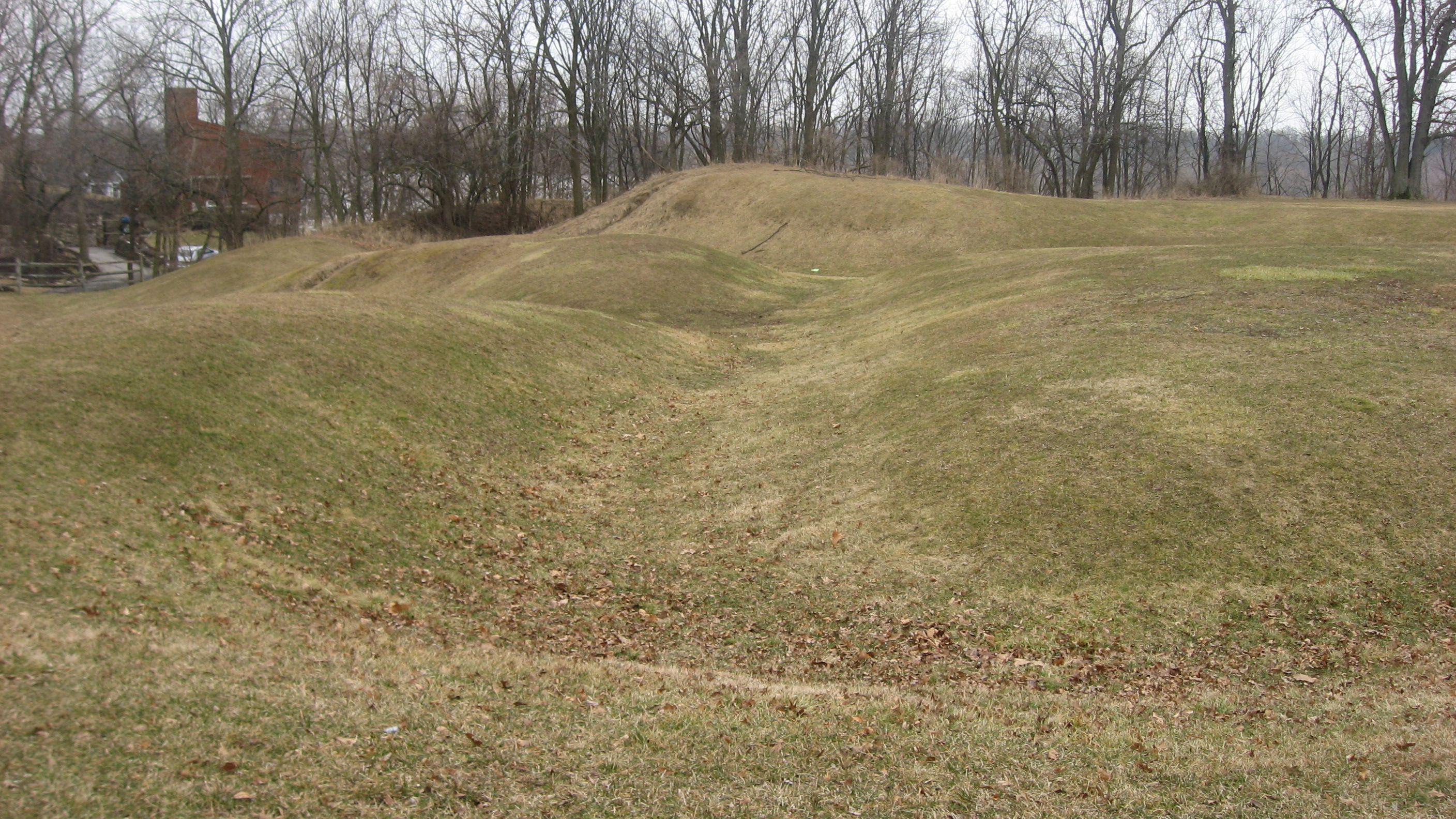
Site of Fort Miami

Wayne's army encamped for three days in sight of Fort Miami. When Campbell asked the meaning of the encampment, Wayne replied that the answer had already been given by the sound of their muskets and the retreat of the Indians. General Wayne had already determined that he could not take Fort Miami by force, because his howitzers were underpowered and he did not have enough provisions for an extended siege. Instead, to illustrate that the U.S. controlled the region, he rode alone to the walls of Fort Miami and slowly conducted an inspection of the fort's exterior. The British garrison at Fort Miami debated whether or not to engage the Americans, but in the absence of orders and being already at war with France, Campbell declined to fire the first shot at U.S. forces. The Legion, meanwhile, destroyed Indian villages and crops in the region of Fort Deposit, and burned Alexander McKee's trading post within sight of Fort Miami. Despite the provocations, the British garrison refused to open fire; Wayne was as unwilling to start a war with Britain as Campbell was to start a war with the United States, and so finally, on 26 August, the Legion departed for Fort Recovery.

Wayne expected a new attack, and even hoped for it while the Legion was at full strength. Although the Native Americans did not reform into a large army, small bands continued to harass the Legion's perimeter, scouts, and supply trains. Although they resented the assignment, Wayne assigned the mounted militia to carry supplies between the chain of forts. On 12 September, Wayne issued invitations for peace negotiations, but they went unanswered. Finally, on 15 September, Wayne led the Legion from Fort Defiance and marched unopposed for two days to the Miami capital of Kekionga, where they constructed Fort Wayne. Wayne appointed Hamtramck as commandant of Fort Wayne and departed in late October, arriving at Fort Greenville on 2 November. That winter, Wayne also reinforced his line of defensive forts with Fort St. Marys, Fort Loramie, and Fort Piqua.

== Aftermath ==
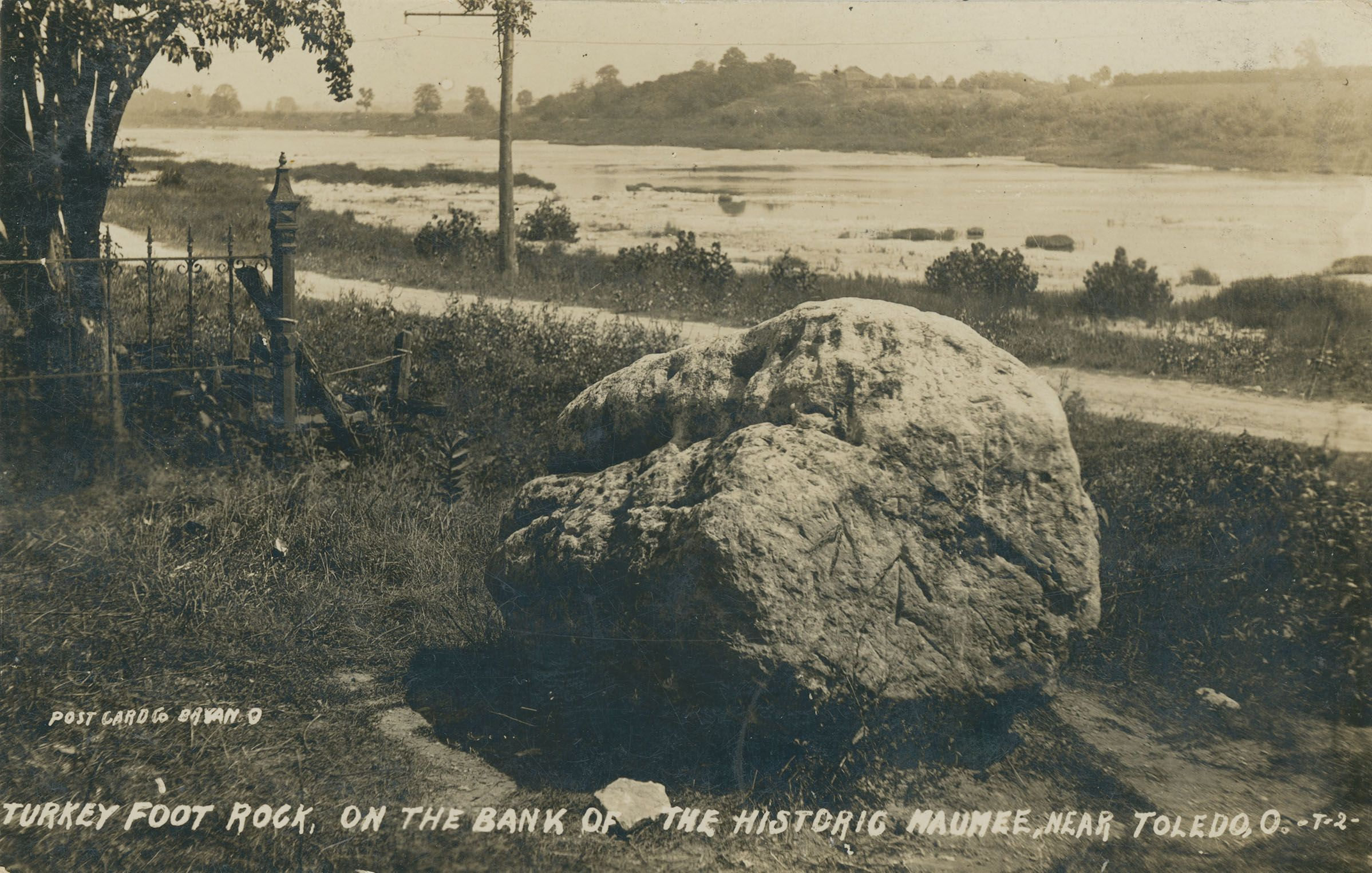
Turkey Foot Rock, at Fallen Timbers Battlefield

Throughout the campaign, Wayne's second in command, General James Wilkinson, secretly tried to undermine him. Wilkinson wrote anonymous negative letters to local newspapers about Wayne and spent years writing negative letters to politicians in Washington, D. C. Wayne was unaware as Wilkinson was recorded as being extremely polite to Wayne in person. Wilkinson was also a Spanish spy at the time and was even hired as an officer. Despite the significant US losses, Wilkinson regarded Fallen Timbers as a mere skirmish, saying the short battle "did not deserve the name of a battle." Years later, a Native American warrior reflected that Little Turtle had warned that the Great Spirit would hide in a cloud if they did not make peace with Wayne. The rainy start to the day was a sign that they would lose.

Parties began suing for peace in December. Antoine Lasselle arrived at Fort Wayne on 17 December with a group of Native Americans and Canadiens. Within a month, most Miami had returned to Kekionga, and representatives of the Potawatomi, Ojibwe, Odawa, and Wyandotte had sought out the Legion to "bury the hatchet." During the summer of 1795, the confederacy met with a U.S. delegation led by General Wayne to negotiate the Treaty of Greenville, which was signed on 3 August. This treaty opened most of the modern U.S. state of Ohio to settlement, using the site of St. Clair's defeat as a reference point to draw a line near the current border of Ohio and Indiana. The Treaty of Greenville, along with Jay's Treaty and Pinckney's Treaty, set the terms of the peace and defined post-colonial relations among the U.S., Britain and Spain.

Henry Knox eventually alerted Wayne about Wilkinson's letters, and Wayne began an investigation. Wayne's suspicions were confirmed when Spanish couriers were intercepted with payments for Wilkinson. He attempted to court martial Wilkinson for his treachery. However, Wayne developed a stomach ulcer, complications from gout, and died on 15 December 1796, at Fort Presque Isle.; there was no court-martial. Instead Wilkinson began his first tenure as Senior Officer of the Army, which lasted for about a year and a half. He continued to pass on intelligence to the Spanish in return for large sums in gold.

For decades following the battle, Odawas visited the battle site and left memorials at Turkey Foot Rock.

The Northwest would remain largely peaceful until the War of 1812. Wayne's aide-de-camp, William Henry Harrison, became territorial secretary, then a member of Congress, and was appointed as governor of the Indiana Territory in 1801. He followed Thomas Jefferson's policy of incremental land purchases from Native American nations. Tecumseh, a young Shawnee veteran of Fallen Timbers who refused to sign the Greenville Treaty, resisted this gradual removal with a new pan-tribal confederation. Harrison attacked this new confederation in the 1811 Battle of Tippecanoe.

Many veterans of the Battle of Fallen Timbers would become known for their later accomplishments, including William Clark, who co-led the Lewis and Clark Expedition, and William Henry Harrison, the 9th President of the United States. Tecumseh, who watched his older brother Sauwauseekau die in battle, would later organize a new confederacy to oppose American Indian removals.

== Legacy ==
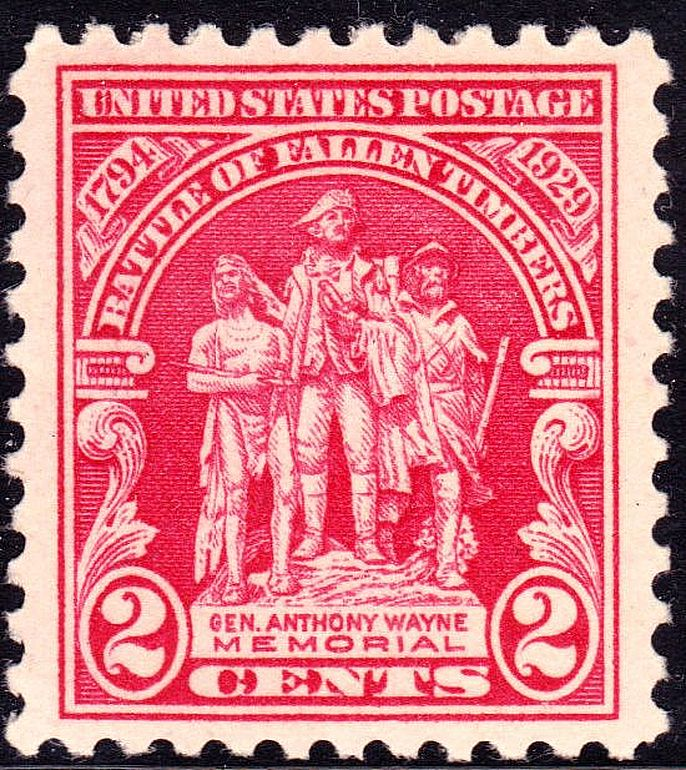
Battle of Fallen Timbers, commemorative issue of 1929

On 14 September 1929, the United States Post Office Department issued a stamp commemorating the 135th anniversary of the Battle of Fallen Timbers. The post office issued a series of stamps referred to as the 'Two Cent Reds' by collectors, issued to commemorate the 150th Anniversaries of the many events that occurred during the American Revolutionary War (1775–1783) and to honor those who were there. The Fallen Timbers stamp features an image of the Battle of Fallen Timbers Monument, which was dedicated that same year.

=== National Park ===
For 200 years, the site of the Battle of Fallen Timbers was thought to be on the floodplain on the banks of the Maumee River, based upon documentation such as the map above and to the right (location of Fallen Timbers Monument). Dr. G. Michael Pratt, an anthropologist and faculty member at Heidelberg University (Ohio), correctly surmised the battlefield was 1/4 mile above the floodplain after considering documentation that described a ravine. The City of Toledo owned the area which was desirable for development. Although the City of Toledo initially refused archaeological exploration, in 1995 and 2001 Pratt was able to conduct archaeological surveys, which relied primarily on metal detection, which revealed musket balls, pieces of muskets, uniform buttons and a bayonet, confirming that major fighting had taken place at the site.

Because of Pratt's archaeological work and advocacy of the Fallen Timbers Preservation Commission, the land was granted National Historic Site status in 1999. A federal grant allowed the Metroparks of the Toledo Area to purchase the land where the artifacts were found in 2001, and the site was developed into a park in affiliation with the National Park Service.

=== Fallen Timbers State Monument ===
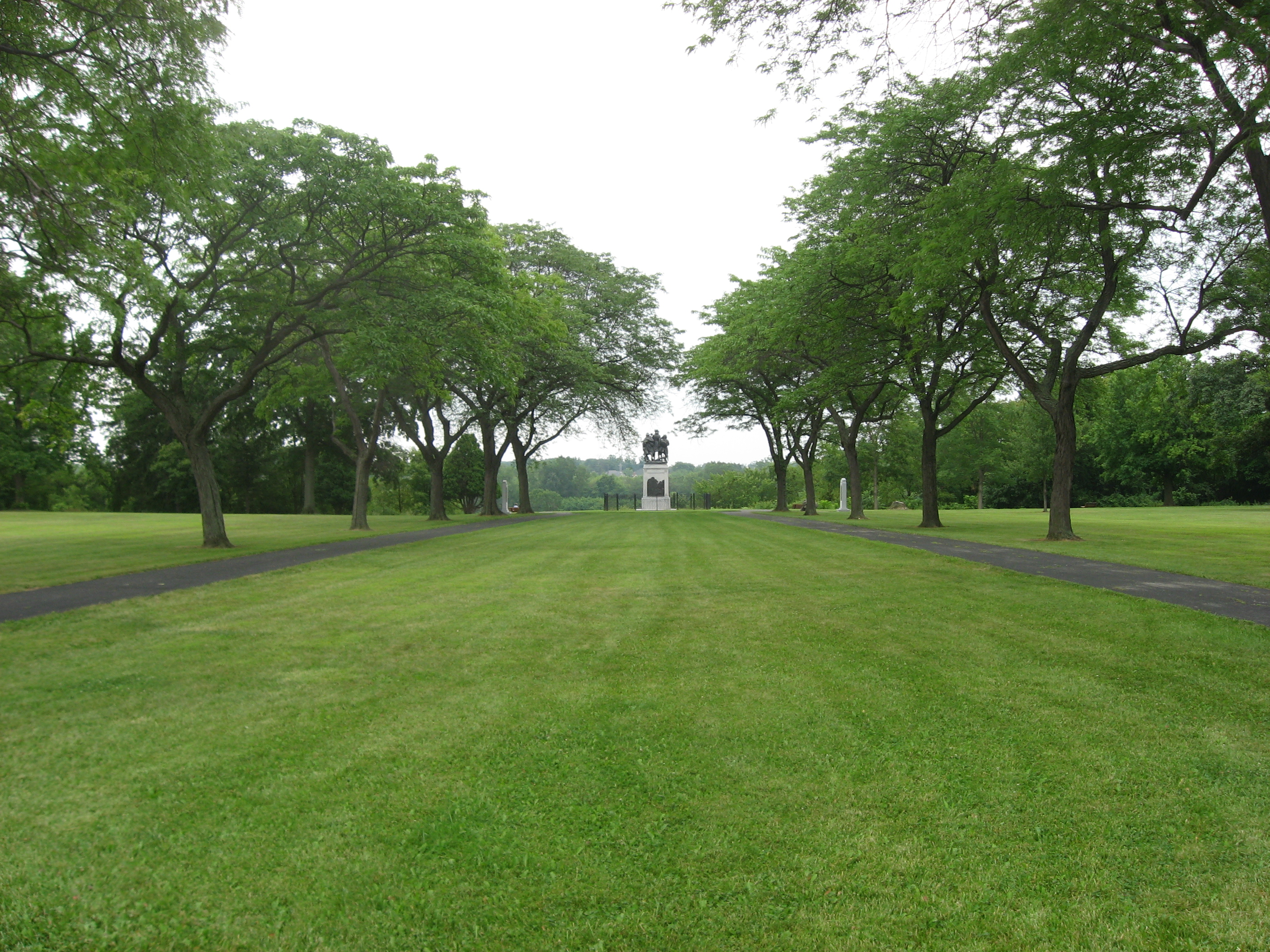
Lines of trees at the battlefield park

The Ohio Historical Society maintains a small park at the site originally believed to have the main fighting (similar historic picture above and right). This site features the Battle of Fallen Timbers Monument, honoring both Major General Anthony Wayne and his army and Little Turtle and his warriors. Additionally, there are plaques describing the Battle of Fallen Timbers and honoring the several Indian tribes that participated. The main monument has tributes inscribed on each of its four sides honoring in turn, Wayne, the fallen soldiers, Little Turtle, and his Indian warriors. The park is located near Maumee in Lucas County. Turkey Foot Rock, marking the death place of Turkey Foot, is also at the site.
