= Peace (Saville) =

1922 sculpture by Bruce Wilder Saville in Columbus, Ohio, U.S.

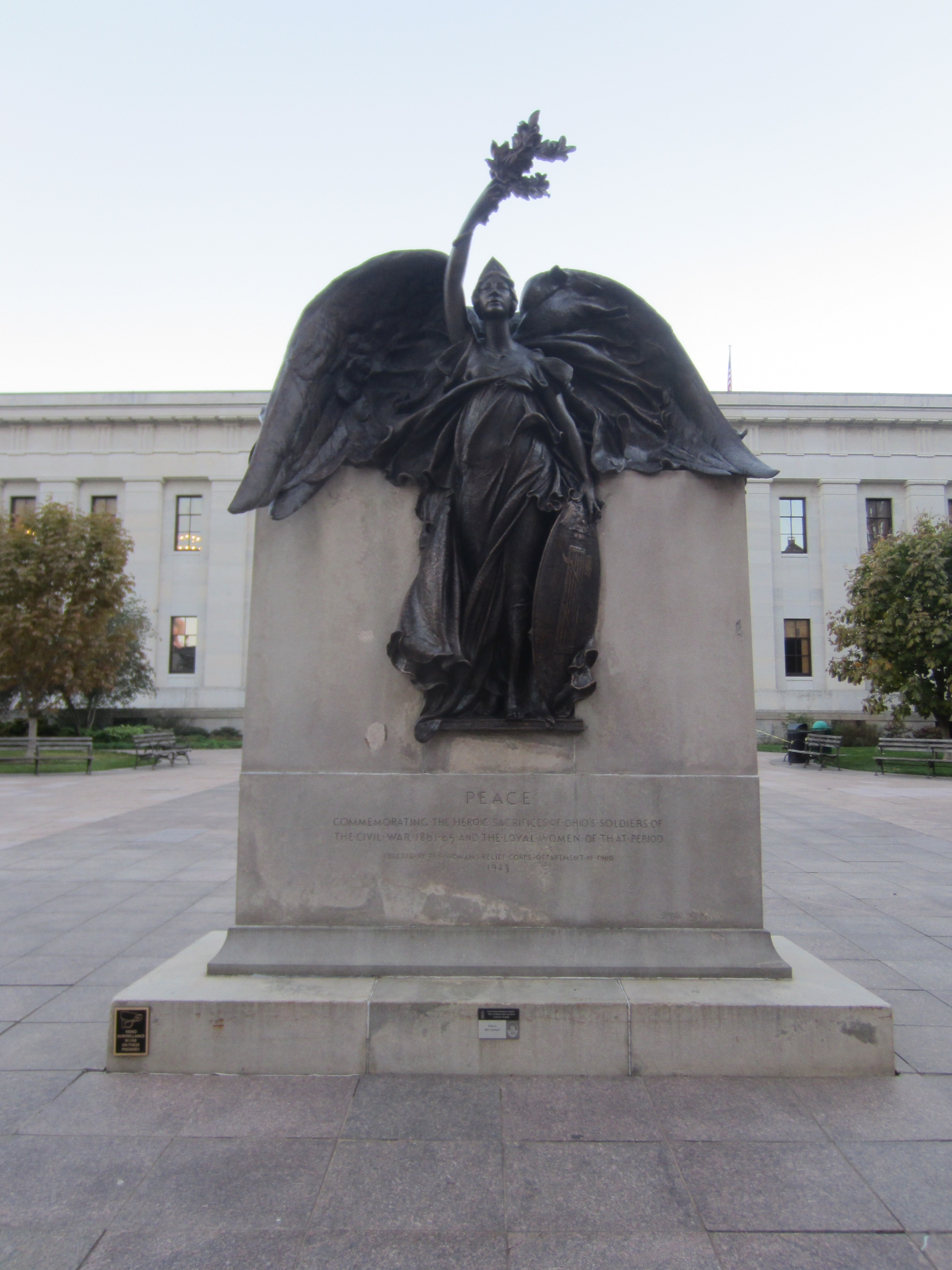
- The sculpture in 2018
- Artist: Bruce Wilder Saville
- Medium: Bronze sculpture
- Location: Columbus, Ohio, United States
- 39°57′44″N 82°59′57″W

Peace is a 1922 bronze sculpture by Bruce Wilder Saville. The sculpture is installed on Capitol Square, the Ohio Statehouse grounds, in Columbus, Ohio.

== Description ==
The bronze allegorical statue depicts a female figure representing peace. The statue measures approximately 13 × 9 × 6 ft., and rests on a granite base measuring approximately 8 ft. 4 in. × 11 ft. 4 1/2 in. × 5 ft. An inscription on the memorial's base reads:

PEACE
COMMEMORATING THE HEROIC SACRIFICES OF OHIO'S SOLDIERS OF
THE CIVIL WAR 1861-65 AND THE LOYAL WOMEN AT THAT PERIOD
ERECTED BY THE WOMAN'S RELIEF CORPS DEPARTMENT OF OHIO
1923

== History ==
The sculpture was dedicated on June 26, 1923. It was donated by the Woman's Relief Corps, the auxiliary to the Grand Army of the Republic which consisted of Union veterans from the American Civil War. It was surveyed by the Smithsonian Institution's "Save Outdoor Sculpture!" program in 1993.
