= Maumee City School District =

School district in Ohio

Coordinates: 41°34′N 83°40′W

Location
- Maumee, Ohio, Ohio; U.S.

District information
- Type: Public School District

Students and staff
- Students: Grades K-12
- District mascot: Panther

Other information
- Website: maumee.k12.oh.us

Maumee City School District is a public school district in Northwest Ohio. The school district serves students who live in the city of Maumee and some adjacent areas of Toledo in Lucas County. The superintendent is Mr. Steve Lee. It comprises the following schools:

- Fairfield Elementary — grades K-3
- Fort Miami Elementary — grades K-3
- Maumee Intermediate School — grades 4-5
- Maumee Middle School — grades 6-8
- Maumee High School — grades 9-12

School colors are Purple and Gold
