= St. Luke's Hospital (Maumee, Ohio) =

McLaren St. Luke's Hospital
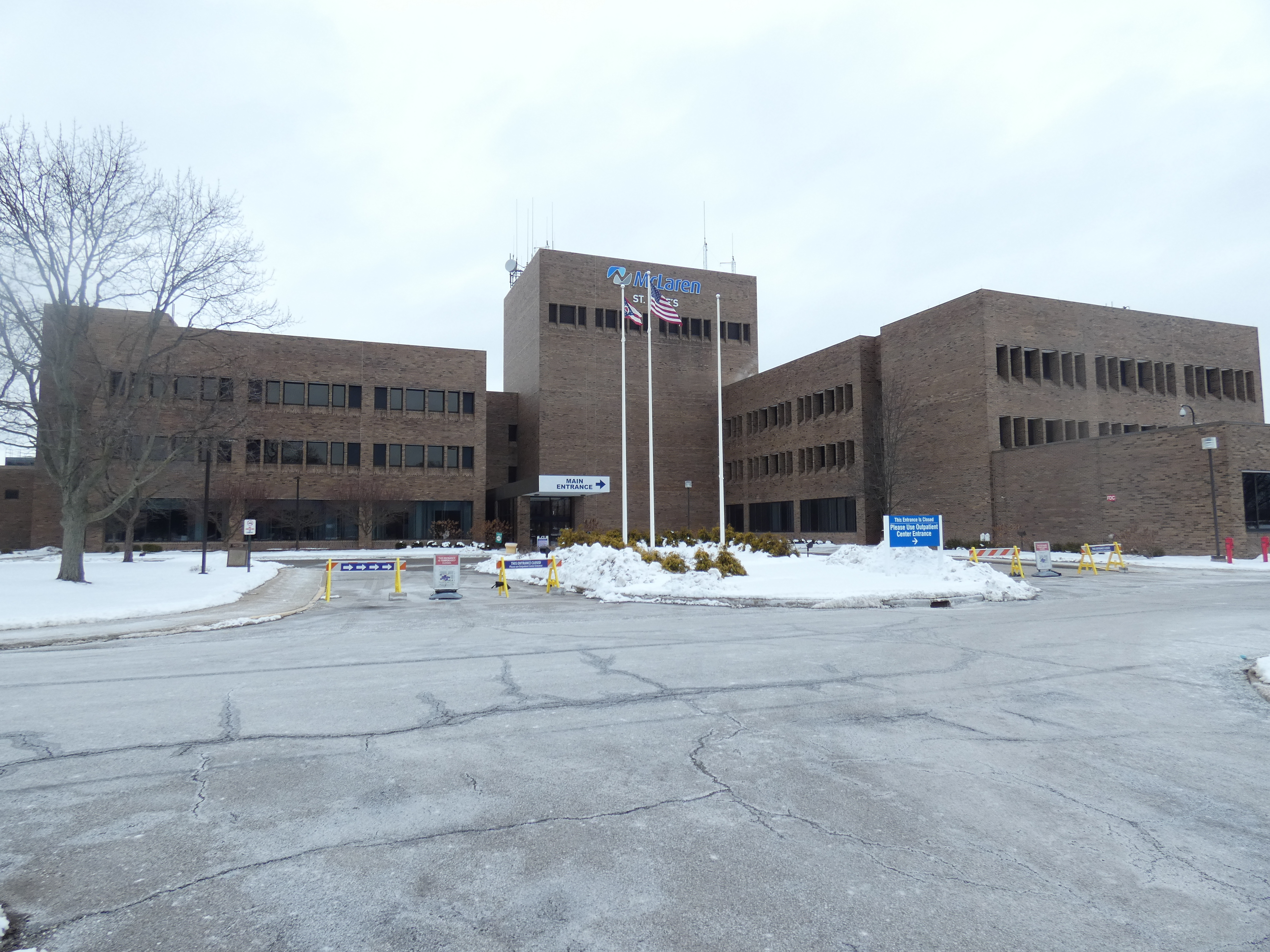

Geography
- Location: Maumee, Ohio, United States
- Coordinates: 41°33′26″N 83°40′56″W

Services
- Emergency department: Yes
- Beds: 300

Helipads
- Helipad: FAA LID: 3OI8

History
- Founded: 1898
- Closed: May 8, 2023

Links
- Website: www.mclaren.org/st-lukes/mclaren-st-lukes-home/
- Lists: Hospitals in Ohio

McLaren St. Luke's Hospital was a non-profit hospital in Maumee, Ohio, operated by McLaren Health Care Corporation. McLaren announced it expected St. Luke's to wind down operations by mid-May, 2023 with assets being purchased by Mercy Health. The hospital officially closed on Monday, May 8, 2023.

== Facilities ==
The hospital was equipped with a helipad for medical evacuation. It acquired the da Vinci robotic surgical system in 2007.

== History ==
William Gillette, a Toledo surgeon, opened a small health clinic in 1898. It expanded into a 50-bed hospital in 1906, opening as the fourth hospital in the Toledo area. Robinwood Hospital was purchased in 1926 by the Federated Lutheran Benevolent Society of Toledo, making it a not-for-profit Christian institution.

The hospital was renamed St. Luke's Hospital in 1951 to emphasize its Christian identity. A lack of space forced the opening of a new site on October 29, 1972. An original capacity of 206 patients was upgraded over 20 years and two expansions, creating the present-day St. Luke's Hospital.

St. Luke's was the last independent hospital in the Toledo area before joining the ProMedica Health System in 2010 and on July 1, 2016, St. Luke's Hospital became independent once again. In August 2020, St. Luke's Hospital was purchased by McLaren Health Care and the hospital was rebranded as McLaren St. Luke's Hospital.

In May, 2022, McLaren announced they will be discontinuing labor and delivery services at St. Luke in September, 2022.

On March 3, 2023, McLaren announced that the hospital will wind down operations by mid-May 2023 citing years of declining revenues and an unstable reimbursement environment. McLaren Health Care and Mercy Health are in the process of finalizing an asset purchase agreement in which Mercy Health will acquire the McLaren St. Luke's facilities, land, and physical assets, pending final due diligence. The campus of McLaren St. Luke's hospital in Maumee includes 73 acres of property and 12 buildings. Mercy Health is set to buy them all. The facility will not remain a hospital. However, it's possible, Mercy Health may keep it as a free-standing emergency department, but that is yet-to-be-determined. Mercy will assume the assets on June 2. The company is working to re-establish as many outpatient services as possible.

As of 2024, while much of the St. Luke's campus remains unused, Orthopaedics and Sports Medicine, Outpatient Rehabilitation and Therapy, Internal Medicine, and Mercy's Neuroscience Institute all have facilities at the property.

As of January 2026, demolition of the main hospital building has begun. According to a statement by Mercy Health, the existing site will be redeveloped into a mixed-use neighbourhood, consisting of medical, commercial, retail and residential buildings. This plan involves demolishing the main hospital building whilst retaining most of the existing medical offices on-site.
