= Maumee, Ohio =

- City
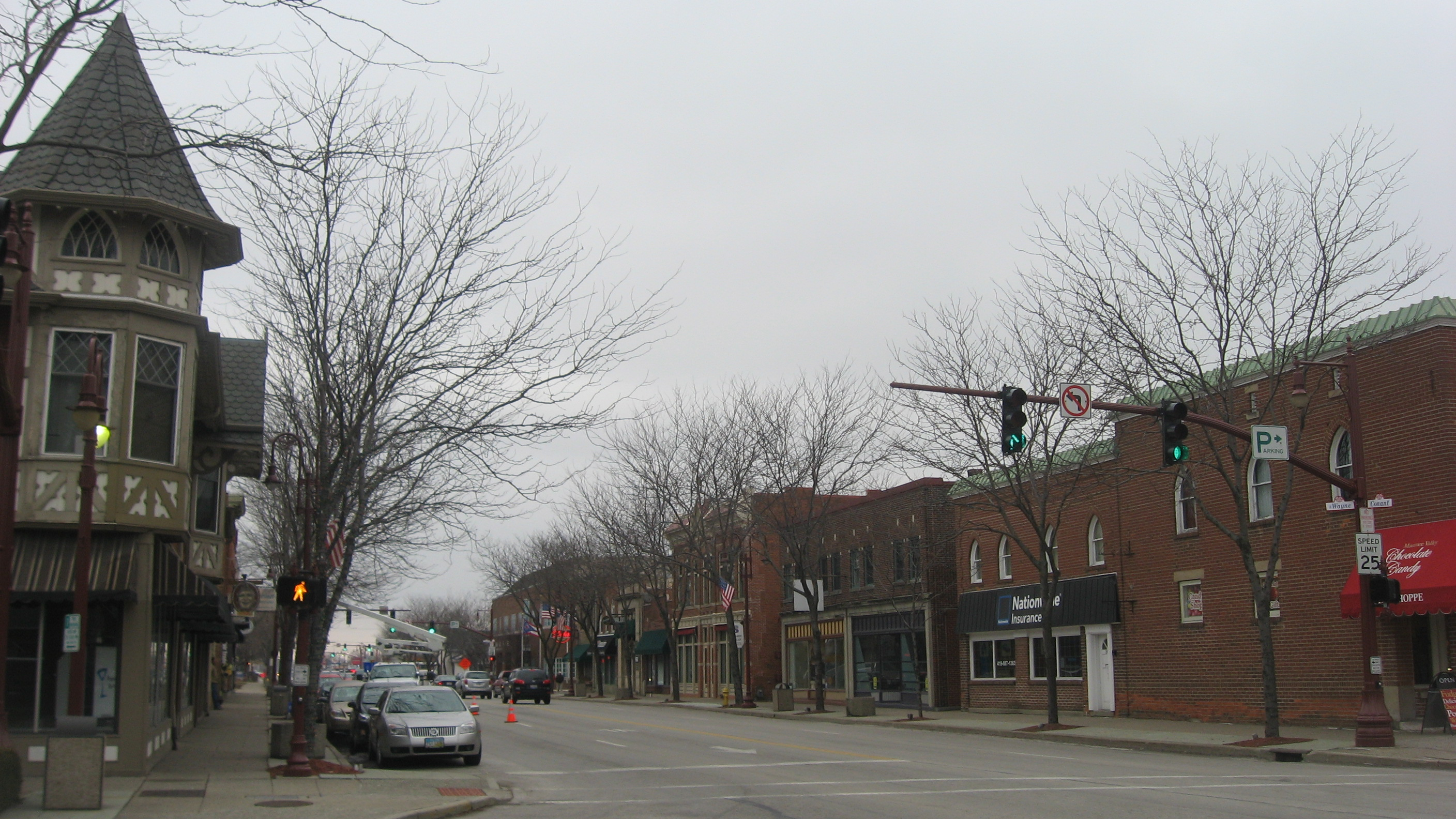
- Maumee Historic District

- Flag Logo
- Interactive map of Maumee, Ohio
- Location within Ohio Location within the United States
- Coordinates: 41°34′25″N 83°38′45″W
- Country: United States
- State: Ohio
- County: Lucas

Area
  - Total: 10.78 sq mi (27.93 km^{2})
  - Land: 10.05 sq mi (26.02 km^{2})
  - Water: 0.74 sq mi (1.92 km^{2})
- Elevation: 633 ft (193 m)

Population (2020)
  - Total: 13,896
  - Density: 1,383.3/sq mi (534.11/km^{2})
- Time zone: UTC−5 (EST)
  - Summer (DST): UTC−4 (EDT)
- ZIP code: 43537
- Area code: 419/567
- FIPS code: 39-48342
- GNIS feature ID: 1086527
- Website: maumee.org

Maumee (/mɔːˈmiː/ maw-MEE) is a city in Lucas County, Ohio, United States. Located along the Maumee River, it is a suburb about 10 miles (16 km) southwest of Toledo. The population was 13,896 at the 2020 census. Maumee was declared an All-America City by the National Civic League in June 2006.

== History ==
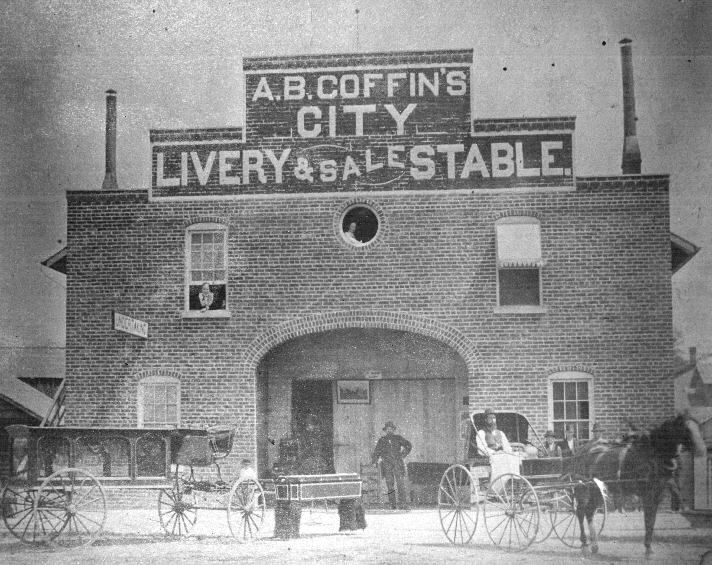
A.B. Coffins City Livery and Sale Stable, c. 1890

In pre-colonial times, Native Americans (notably the Ottawa) began using the rich resources at the present site of Maumee, Ohio, in the Maumee River valley. Throughout much of the eighteenth century, French, British and American forces struggled for control of the lower Maumee River as a major transportation artery linking East and West through Lake Erie.

Following the American Revolutionary War, Native Americans of the region, including the Odawa, Ojibwe and Potawatomie, and Shawnee, made alliances in what became called the Northwest Territory by the United States, which claimed it from the British after gaining independence. The Northwest Indian War was a series of conflicts from 1785 through 1795 between these nations and the US; it ended with a decisive American victory over the British and their Native American allies at the Battle of Fallen Timbers at Maumee in 1794. Maumee is the site of Gen. "Mad" Anthony Wayne's final fort, Fort Deposit, built in Aug. 1794 on his way to the battle of Fallen Timbers. Together with the conclusion of the War of 1812, which preserved most US territory, the end of warfare and defeat of the Native Americans opened the way for American expansion in present-day Ohio. Promoters arrived who were eager to make a fortune in selling and developing western lands.

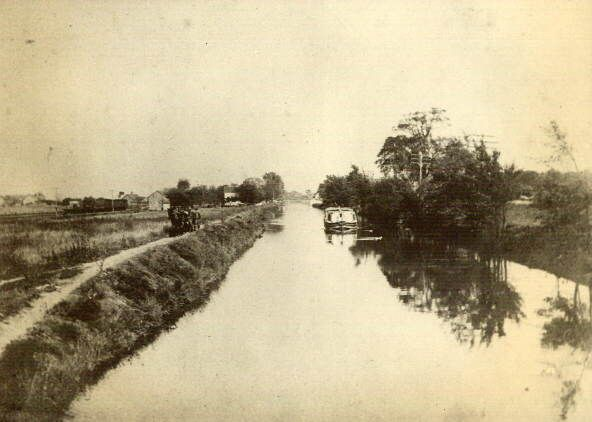
The Miami and Erie Canal as seen from a bridge at Ford Street in Maumee around 1900

In 1817, a town plat was laid out at the Foot of the Rapids of the Maumee River, and within a decade, the settlement was gaining recognition as a major trans-shipment point connecting Lake Erie and the land to the west. The opening of the Erie Canal in 1825 in New York State stimulated migration to Ohio, as it connected Great Lakes communities to the Hudson River and port of New York City. Completion of the Wabash and Erie Canal in 1840 further stimulated the economy. Jessup Scott, a noted town promoter, predicted that Maumee would become the "great city of the West," surpassing all rivals. By mid-century Maumee was a flourishing center of river trade, commerce and shipbuilding. Nearly twenty mercantile companies crowded the three miles (5 km) of ship docks and competed for the retail and wholesale trade.

In 1840, Maumee was designated as the county seat; lawyers came from miles around to practice in the imposing Greek Revival Lucas County Courthouse erected by private subscription. Court days were a time of trade and commerce, as well. The federal custom house and post office also were located in Maumee.

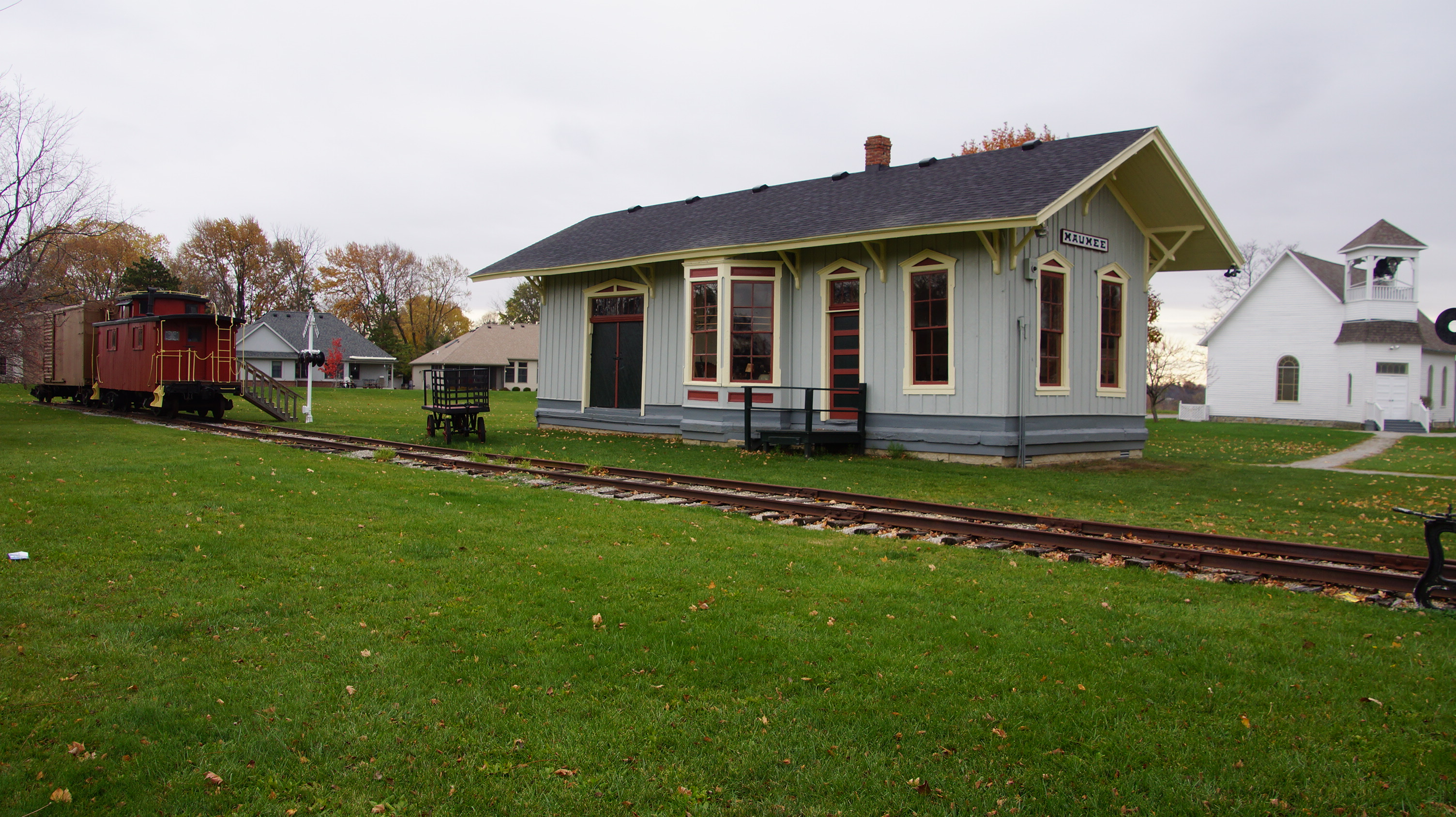
C & O Toledo Terminal in Maumee

Dreams of greatness began to fade in the 1850s, when ships too large to navigate the river were introduced for use in the Great Lakes. In addition, the railroad provided faster and cheaper means of transportation than river traffic and drew off business. As the population expanded westward, Maumee lost the county seat in 1854.

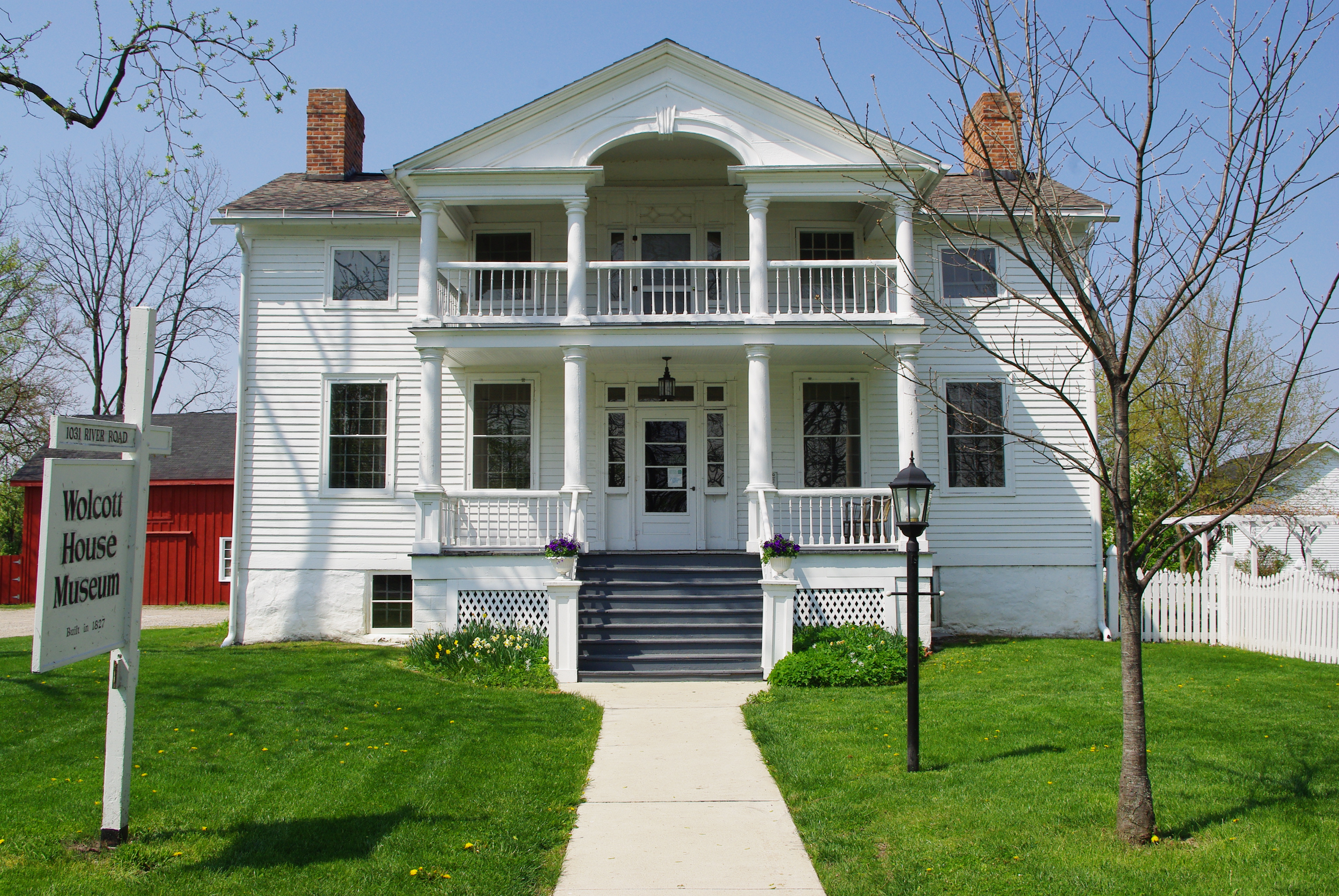
Hull–Wolcott House

Nearly a century later, in the 1970s, Maumee developed an economic renaissance. Today the city is one of the largest business centers in Northwest Ohio. Together, Arrowhead Business Park and Maumee's historic business community contribute to the 30,000 plus jobs in the community. Maumee has expanded its original boundaries, and the population is now more than 13,700 residents, representing a continuing downturn from the 15,000+ high of the early 1970s. Maumee's neighborhoods retain their small town flavor; in addition, many historic homes and buildings of the early residents still stand along the tree-lined streets of the architectural districts.

== Geography ==
Maumee is located about 11 miles upriver of Toledo, which is at the mouth of the Maumee River on Maumee Bay. This is a roughly triangle-shaped city. Its borders are formed by Interstate 80/90 to the north, to the west by Interstate 475/U.S. Route 23, and to the southeast by the Maumee River. It is just downriver from Waterville.

According to the United States Census Bureau, the city has a total area of 10.61 square miles (27.48 km^{2}), of which 9.89 square miles (25.61 km^{2}) is land and 0.72 square miles (1.86 km^{2}) is water.

== Demographics ==
Historical population
Census	Pop.	Note	%±
1840	840		—
1850	1,465		74.4%
1860	1,691		15.4%
1870	1,779		5.2%
1880	1,780		0.1%
1890	1,645		−7.6%
1900	1,856		12.8%
1910	2,307		24.3%
1920	3,195		38.5%
1930	4,588		43.6%
1940	4,683		2.1%
1950	5,548		18.5%
1960	12,063		117.4%
1970	15,937		32.1%
1980	15,747		−1.2%
1990	15,561		−1.2%
2000	15,237		−2.1%
2010	14,286		−6.2%
2020	13,896		−2.7%
2025 (est.)	13,521		−2.7%

=== 2020 census ===
As of the 2020 census, Maumee had a population of 13,896. The median age was 41.0 years. 20.2% of residents were under the age of 18 and 18.2% of residents were 65 years of age or older. For every 100 females there were 95.2 males, and for every 100 females age 18 and over there were 94.5 males.

99.9% of residents lived in urban areas, while 0.1% lived in rural areas.

There were 6,145 households in Maumee, of which 25.9% had children under the age of 18 living in them. Of all households, 45.3% were married-couple households, 19.3% were households with a male householder and no spouse or partner present, and 27.2% were households with a female householder and no spouse or partner present. About 33.1% of all households were made up of individuals and 12.2% had someone living alone who was 65 years of age or older.

There were 6,463 housing units, of which 4.9% were vacant. The homeowner vacancy rate was 1.6% and the rental vacancy rate was 7.2%.

Racial composition as of the 2020 census
Race	Number	Percent
White	12,409	89.3%
Black or African American	314	2.3%
American Indian and Alaska Native	28	0.2%
Asian	171	1.2%
Native Hawaiian and Other Pacific Islander	2	0.0%
Some other race	140	1.0%
Two or more races	832	6.0%
Hispanic or Latino (of any race)	659	4.7%

=== 2010 census ===
As of the census of 2010, there were 14,286 people, 6,037 households, and 3,854 families living in the city. The population density was 1,444.5 inhabitants per square mile (557.7/km^{2}). There were 6,435 housing units at an average density of 650.7 per square mile (251.2/km^{2}). The racial makeup of the city was 94.7% White, 1.8% African American, 0.2% Native American, 0.9% Asian, 0.7% from other races, and 1.7% from two or more races. Hispanic or Latino of any race were 3.4% of the population.

There were 6,037 households, of which 30.0% had children under the age of 18 living with them, 49.2% were married couples living together, 10.7% had a female householder with no husband present, 4.0% had a male householder with no wife present, and 36.2% were non-families. 30.5% of all households were made up of individuals, and 10.6% had someone living alone who was 65 years of age or older. The average household size was 2.37 and the average family size was 2.98.

The median age in the city was 39.7 years. 22.6% of residents were under the age of 18; 8.5% were between the ages of 18 and 24; 25.8% were from 25 to 44; 29.5% were from 45 to 64; and 13.7% were 65 years of age or older. The gender makeup of the city was 49.0% male and 51.0% female.

=== 2000 census ===
As of the census of 2000, there were 15,237 people, 6,340 households, and 4,209 families living in the city. The population density was 1,533.6 inhabitants per square mile (592.1/km^{2}). There were 6,613 housing units at an average density of 665.6 per square mile (257.0/km^{2}). The racial makeup of the city was 96.61% White, 1.05% African American, 0.05% Native American, 0.72% Asian, 0.03% Pacific Islander, 0.58% from other races, and 0.96% from two or more races. Hispanic or Latino of any race were 1.82% of the population.

There were 6,340 households, out of which 30.4% had children under the age of 18 living with them, 54.4% were married couples living together, 9.4% had a female householder with no husband present, and 33.6% were non-families. 29.4% of all households were made up of individuals, and 9.8% had someone living alone who was 65 years of age or older. The average household size was 2.40 and the average family size was 3.00.

In the city the population was spread out, with 24.5% under the age of 18, 7.7% from 18 to 24, 29.8% from 25 to 44, 25.0% from 45 to 64, and 12.9% who were 65 years of age or older. The median age was 38 years. For every 100 females, there were 93.0 males. For every 100 females age 18 and over, there were 88.7 males.

The median income for a household in the city was $47,768, and the median income for a family was $60,776. Males had a median income of $41,281 versus $30,273 for females. The per capita income for the city was $23,805. About 3.0% of families and 4.3% of the population were below the poverty line, including 4.9% of those under age 18 and 5.9% of those age 65 or over.

== Economy ==
According to the city's 2024 Annual Comprehensive Financial Report, the top employers in the city are:

No.	Employer	No. of employees
1	United Parcel Service	2,865
2	Dana Corporation	1,011
3	Maumee Board of Education	626
4	Spartan Chemical Co.	276
5	Promedica Health System	250
6	The Andersons	218
7	Therma Tru Corp.	189
8	The Toledo Clinic	179
9	Matrix Technologies Inc.	153
10	Clifton Larson Allan LLP	144

St. Luke's Hospital closed in May, 2023.

== Education ==
Maumee's public education system is run by the Maumee City School District, which received an "Effective" rating from the state of Ohio for the 2008–09 school year, the third highest of six possible ratings. This school district is the oldest chartered district in the state of Ohio. The school district is broken into four different categories: Elementary (K–3), which include Fairfield and Fort Miami Elementaries. The next level is Maumee Intermediate School, which includes all students in the district in grades 4–5. Next, Maumee Middle School, includes all students in the district in grades 6–8. There is only one high school in Maumee, Maumee High School, which serves grades 9–12.

There are also several private elementary and high schools in the area, including Maumee Valley Country Day School (South Toledo), St. John's Jesuit High School (South Toledo), Toledo Christian Schools (South Toledo), St. Joseph Catholic School & Preparatory (Maumee), and St. Patrick of Heatherdowns School (South Toledo).

Maumee has a public library, a branch of the Toledo-Lucas County Public Library.

== Notable people ==
- Harold Anderson, founder of The Andersons, an agribusiness
- James W. Forsyth, U.S. Army general
- Richard "Dick" Kazmaier, 1951 Heisman Trophy winner
- Robert Knepper, actor, played Theodore "T-Bag" Bagwell in Prison Break
- Henry Ware Lawton, U.S. Army officer who served in the Civil War, Apache Wars, Spanish–American War
- Steve Mason, Southern California radio broadcaster
- Larry Nuber, auto racing announcer on ESPN
- Dane Sanzenbacher, wide receiver for the Cincinnati Bengals of the NFL
