= National Register of Historic Places listings in Lucas County, Ohio =

Location of Lucas County in Ohio

This is a list of the National Register of Historic Places listings in Lucas County, Ohio.

This is intended to be a complete list of the properties and districts on the National Register of Historic Places in Lucas County, Ohio, United States. The locations of National Register properties and districts for which the latitude and longitude coordinates are included below, may be seen in an online map.

There are 101 properties and districts listed on the National Register in the county, including 2 National Historic Landmarks. Another 6 properties were once listed but have been removed.

This National Park Service list is complete through NPS recent listings posted August 28, 2026.

== Current listings ==
	Name on the Register	Image	Date listed	Location	City or town	Description
1	Ashland Avenue Baptist Church	Ashland Avenue Baptist Church	November 26, 1980 (#80003144)	Ashland and Woodruff Sts. 41°39′38″N 83°33′00″W	Toledo	
2	B'nai Israel Synagogue	B'nai Israel Synagogue	October 6, 2005 (#05001145)	2146 N. 12th St. at Bancroft St. 41°39′50″N 83°32′23″W	Toledo	
3	Berdan Building	Berdan Building	May 29, 1975 (#75001468)	601 Washington St. 41°38′54″N 83°32′27″W	Toledo	
4	Birckhead Place Historic District	Birckhead Place Historic District	October 13, 1983 (#83004316)	Birckhead Pl. 41°40′30″N 83°32′42″W	Toledo	
5	Birmingham Historic District	Birmingham Historic District	August 8, 1996 (#96000834)	Roughly bounded by Genesee, York, Esther, Magyar, Consaul, and the Conrail tracks 41°39′42″N 83°29′47″W	Toledo	
6	R. Brand and Company	R. Brand and Company	May 27, 1975 (#75001469)	120-124 St. Clair St. 41°38′57″N 83°32′10″W	Toledo	
7	Brandville School	Brandville School	June 17, 1994 (#94000595)	1133 Grasser St. 41°37′49″N 83°29′18″W	Oregon	
8	The Broer-Freeman Building	The Broer-Freeman Building	December 7, 2020 (#100005856)	622 Jefferson Ave. 41°39′05″N 83°32′19″W	Toledo	
9	Bronson Place	Bronson Place	November 29, 1984 (#84000459)	Roughly bounded by Cherry St. and Central and Franklin Aves. 41°40′41″N 83°32′52″W	Toledo	
10	Burt's Theater	Burt's Theater	November 1, 1977 (#77001074)	719-723 Jefferson St. 41°39′06″N 83°32′24″W	Toledo	
11	Bush Street Historic District	Bush Street Historic District	June 1, 1982 (#82003609)	Bush and Erie Sts. 41°39′52″N 83°31′12″W	Toledo	
12	Central YMCA	Central YMCA	April 15, 1982 (#82003610)	1110 Jefferson Ave. 41°39′13″N 83°32′33″W	Toledo	Renumbered to 1100 Jefferson Avenue
13	Columbian House	Columbian House	December 17, 1969 (#69000146)	River and Farnsworth Rds. 41°29′57″N 83°43′03″W	Waterville	
14	Commodore Perry Hotel	Commodore Perry Hotel	October 24, 1997 (#97001240)	505 Jefferson Ave. 41°39′02″N 83°32′15″W	Toledo	
15	Craft Master Building	Craft Master Building	August 29, 2022 (#100008037)	328 North Westwood Ave. 41°38′33″N 83°36′24″W	Toledo	
16	DeVilbiss Manufacturing Building	DeVilbiss Manufacturing Building	June 5, 2023 (#100009023)	300 Phillips Ave. 41°41′21″N 83°33′10″W	Toledo	
17	East Side Commercial Block	East Side Commercial Block	May 3, 1976 (#76001473)	107-117 Main St. 41°38′54″N 83°31′22″W	Toledo	
18	East Toledo Historic District	East Toledo Historic District	August 8, 1996 (#96000831)	Roughly bounded by Front, Platt, Starr, and Spring Grove; 41°37′38″N 83°30′44″W	Toledo	
19	East Toledo Main Street Historic District		March 17, 2025 (#100011535)	Main Street, bounded by Front St. and Starr Ave, between Euclid and Platt streets 41°38′46″N 83°31′15″W	Toledo	
20	Eckenrode and Breisach Houses	Eckenrode and Breisach Houses	April 6, 1978 (#78002120)	202 and 204 E. Dudley St. 41°33′48″N 83°39′06″W	Maumee	
21	Englewood Historic District	Englewood Historic District	May 29, 1998 (#98000601)	Roughly bounded by W. Bancroft, Lawrence, Oakwood, Hoag, and Detroit Sts. 41°39′38″N 83°33′54″W	Toledo	
22	Fallen Timbers Battlefield	Fallen Timbers Battlefield	October 15, 1966 (#66000616)	2 mi (3.2 km) west of Maumee on U.S. Route 24; 41°32′39″N 83°41′51″W	Monclova Township	
23	First Church of Christ, Scientist	First Church of Christ, Scientist	November 29, 1978 (#78002125)	2704 Monroe St. 41°39′43″N 83°33′55″W	Toledo	
24	First Presbyterian Church of Maumee Chapel	First Presbyterian Church of Maumee Chapel	August 13, 1973 (#73001498)	200 E. Broadway; 41°33′41″N 83°39′03″W	Maumee	
25	Forsythe-Puhl House	Forsythe-Puhl House	May 18, 1989 (#89000429)	106 E. Harrison Ave. 41°33′40″N 83°38′54″W	Maumee	
26	Fort Industry Square	Fort Industry Square	July 23, 1973 (#73001501)	Bounded by Summit, Monroe, and Water Sts. and Jefferson Ave. 41°38′57″N 83°32′06″W	Toledo	
27	Fort Miamis Site	Fort Miamis Site	June 18, 1975 (#75001466)	Along the Maumee River at Fort Miamis State Memorial; 41°34′22″N 83°37′35″W	Maumee	
28	Peter Gendron House	Peter Gendron House	March 3, 1983 (#83002001)	1413 Walnut St. 41°39′50″N 83°32′09″W	Toledo	
29	Gillett-Shoemaker-Welsh House	Gillett-Shoemaker-Welsh House	July 18, 1975 (#75001474)	133 N. 4th St. 41°30′07″N 83°43′16″W	Waterville	
30	Governor's Inn	Governor's Inn	October 18, 1974 (#74001557)	301 River Rd. 41°33′52″N 83°38′46″W	Maumee	
31	Peck Griswold House	Peck Griswold House	May 22, 1978 (#78002121)	228 E. Broadway; 41°33′42″N 83°38′59″W	Maumee	
32	Hanson House	Hanson House	May 22, 1978 (#78002122)	405 E. Broadway; 41°33′47″N 83°38′50″W	Maumee	
33	Liberty Whitcomb Haskins House	Liberty Whitcomb Haskins House	July 1, 1975 (#75001475)	North of Waterville at 625 Canal Rd. 41°30′34″N 83°43′09″W	Waterville	
34	Hillcrest Hotel	Hillcrest Hotel	September 18, 1998 (#98001179)	1603 Madison Ave. 41°39′23″N 83°32′46″W	Toledo	
35	House Of Four Pillars	House Of Four Pillars	July 16, 1973 (#73001499)	322 E. Broadway; 41°33′44″N 83°38′53″W	Maumee	
36	Isaac Hull Store	Isaac Hull Store	March 30, 1978 (#78002123)	114 E. Harrison St. 41°33′37″N 83°39′05″W	Maumee	
37	Hull-Wolcott House	Hull-Wolcott House	January 26, 1970 (#70000506)	1031 River Rd. 41°34′20″N 83°38′21″W	Maumee	
38	Huron-Superior Streets Warehouse-Produce Historic District	Huron-Superior Streets Warehouse-Produce Historic District	March 24, 1993 (#93000153)	Roughly bounded by Erie, Monroe, Superior and Market Sts. 41°38′52″N 83°32′28″W	Toledo	
39	Interurban Bridge	Interurban Bridge	June 19, 1972 (#72001036)	1 mi (1.6 km) south of Waterville over the Maumee River; 41°29′11″N 83°43′42″W	Waterville	Extends into Wood County
40	Inverness Club	Inverness Club	May 10, 1993 (#93000398)	4601 Dorr St. 41°39′00″N 83°39′00″W	Toledo	
41	Ira Apartments	Ira Apartments	August 15, 1996 (#96000868)	1302 Parkside Boulevard; 41°39′11″N 83°35′38″W	Toledo	Demolished in mid-February 2007
42	John Isham Farmstead	John Isham Farmstead	September 16, 1992 (#92001159)	8460 S. River Rd. 41°28′55″N 83°44′48″W	Waterville	
43	John Isham House	John Isham House	August 9, 1982 (#82005388)	8460 S. River Rd. 41°28′54″N 83°44′47″W	Waterville	
44	Landers Brothers Company Building	Landers Brothers Company Building	December 23, 2019 (#100004779)	443 10th St. 41°39′23″N 83°32′19″W	Toledo	
45	Lasalle, Koch and Company Department Store	Lasalle, Koch and Company Department Store	August 4, 1995 (#95001001)	513 Adams St. at its junction with Huron St. 41°39′11″N 83°32′08″W	Toledo	
46	Edward D. Libbey House	Edward D. Libbey House	May 4, 1983 (#83004379)	2008 Scottwood Ave. 41°38′32″N 83°33′29″W	Toledo	
47	Edward Drummond Libbey High School	Edward Drummond Libbey High School	September 15, 2011 (#11000672)	1250 Western Ave. 41°38′07″N 83°34′17″W	Toledo	
48	Lucas County Courthouse and Jail	Lucas County Courthouse and Jail	May 11, 1973 (#73002295)	Courthouse Sq. and 810-814 Jackson; 41°39′19″N 83°32′14″W	Toledo	
49	Lucas County Hospital and Nurse's Home	Lucas County Hospital and Nurse's Home	October 17, 1997 (#97001224)	2101 and 2155 Arlington Ave. 41°37′21″N 83°35′42″W	Toledo	
50	Isaac R. Ludwig Historical Mill	Isaac R. Ludwig Historical Mill	June 28, 1974 (#74001558)	Mill Rd. in Providence Park; 41°24′55″N 83°51′45″W	Providence Township	
51	Madison Avenue Historic District	Madison Avenue Historic District	June 26, 1998 (#86003829)	Roughly bounded by Madison, Adams and Huron Sts.; also 311, 315-317, 319-323, 325-327, 329, 331-333, 335 North Superior St. 41°39′08″N 83°32′12″W	Toledo	Boundary increase approved September 2, 2021
52	Maumee Historic District	Maumee Historic District	January 18, 1974 (#09000099)	Roughly W. Harrison, W. Broadway, Cass, Allen, and W. Dudley; 41°33′45″N 83°39′14″W	Maumee	
53	Maumee Sidecut	Maumee Sidecut	April 11, 1973 (#73001500)	North of the Maumee River, southwest of Ewing Island; 41°33′30″N 83°39′36″W	Maumee	
54	Maumee Theater	Maumee Theater	April 1, 1998 (#98000318)	601 Conant St. 41°33′53″N 83°39′20″W	Maumee	
55	Maumee Uptown Historic District	Maumee Uptown Historic District	March 1, 1984 (#84003766)	Conant, Wayne, and Dudley Sts. 41°33′44″N 83°39′15″W	Maumee	
56	The Meister Apartments	The Meister Apartments	December 27, 2022 (#100008480)	1432-1434 (1430-1436) North Huron St. 41°39′44″N 83°31′13″W	Toledo	
57	Monroe Street Commercial Buildings	Monroe Street Commercial Buildings	December 12, 1976 (#76001474)	513-623 Monroe St. 41°39′00″N 83°32′24″W	Toledo	
58	Morehouse-Downes House	Morehouse-Downes House	May 29, 1975 (#75001476)	4 S. River Rd. 41°29′56″N 83°43′03″W	Waterville	
59	Albert Neukom House	Albert Neukom House	March 4, 1971 (#71000644)	301 Broadway; 41°38′28″N 83°32′29″W	Toledo	
60	Ohio Theatre	Ohio Theatre	March 29, 2006 (#06000198)	3114 Lagrange St. 41°40′45″N 83°32′26″W	Toledo	
61	Old Central Post Office	Old Central Post Office	February 23, 1972 (#72001030)	13th St. between Madison and Jefferson Aves. 41°39′17″N 83°32′39″W	Toledo	
62	Old West End District	Old West End District	March 14, 1973 (#73001503)	Roughly bounded by Delaware, Collingwood, and Glenwood Aves. and Grove Pl.; also roughly bounded by Glenwood, Glover, Ashland, Collingwood, and Central Aves. 41°39′45″N 83°36′41″W	Toledo	Second set of boundaries represents a boundary increase of March 30, 1984
63	Ontario Building	Ontario Building	December 10, 2018 (#100003209)	713-717 Jefferson Ave. 41°39′06″N 83°32′23″W	Toledo	
64	The Overmyer Building	The Overmyer Building	December 23, 2019 (#100004780)	15 South Ontario St. 41°38′55″N 83°32′34″W	Toledo	
65	Pray-Starkweather House	Pray-Starkweather House	May 29, 1975 (#75001477)	144 N. River Rd. 41°30′06″N 83°43′00″W	Waterville	
66	Providence Historic District	Providence Historic District	August 13, 1975 (#75001467)	Court and Main Sts. and Ludwig and Providence-Neopolis Rds. in Providence; 41°25′07″N 83°52′24″W	Providence Township	
67	Pythian Castle	Pythian Castle	February 23, 1972 (#72001032)	801 Jefferson Ave. 41°39′07″N 83°32′25″W	Toledo	
68	Henry Reed Jr. House	Henry Reed Jr. House	April 20, 1978 (#78002124)	511-513 White St. 41°33′57″N 83°38′59″W	Maumee	
69	Riverview	Riverview	July 3, 2012 (#12000394)	200 N. St. Clair St. and 215 and 239 Summit St. 41°39′02″N 83°32′06″W	Toledo	
70	Riverview Apartments	Riverview Apartments	April 21, 1983 (#83002002)	1829-1837 Summit St. 41°39′57″N 83°30′40″W	Toledo	
71	St. Ann Roman Catholic Church Complex	St. Ann Roman Catholic Church Complex	May 5, 1983 (#83002003)	1105 W. Bancroft and 1120 Horace Sts. 41°39′47″N 83°34′12″W	Toledo	
72	St. Clair Street Historic District	St. Clair Street Historic District	May 29, 1975 (#75001471)	Both sides of St. Clair St. from Perry St. to the southern side of Lafayette St.; 28 N. St Clair, 23-29 & 31 Summit; 41°38′48″N 83°32′20″W	Toledo	Second set of addresses represent a boundary adjustment in 2014.
73	St. Patrick's Catholic Church	St. Patrick's Catholic Church	February 23, 1972 (#72001033)	13th St. and Avondale Ave. 41°38′56″N 83°32′45″W	Toledo	
74	Saint Peter and Saint Paul Historic District-Oliver's Second addition	Saint Peter and Saint Paul Historic District-Oliver's Second addition	March 13, 1987 (#87000465)	600 and 700 blocks of S. Saint Clair St. 41°38′22″N 83°32′53″W	Toledo	
75	Secor Hotel	Secor Hotel	April 30, 1976 (#76001475)	413-423 Jefferson Ave. 41°39′01″N 83°32′13″W	Toledo	
76	Joseph K. Secor House	Joseph K. Secor House	June 11, 1979 (#79003108)	311 Bush St. 41°39′41″N 83°31′05″W	Toledo	
77	Spicer Manufacturing Building		March 11, 2024 (#100010036)	4100 Bennett Road; 41°41′45″N 83°33′22″W	Toledo	
78	Spitzer Building	Spitzer Building	April 21, 1983 (#83002004)	514-526 Madison Ave. 41°39′08″N 83°32′11″W	Toledo	
79	Spring Grove Historic District	Spring Grove Historic District	August 8, 1996 (#96000832)	Roughly bounded by Mason, Spring Grove, Greenwood, and Conrail tracks 41°38′32″N 83°30′26″W	Toledo	
80	Standart-Simmons Hardware Company	Standart-Simmons Hardware Company	May 29, 1975 (#75001472)	36 S. Erie St. 41°38′52″N 83°32′33″W	Toledo	
81	Successful Sales (Oliver House Hotel)	Successful Sales (Oliver House Hotel)	May 6, 1971 (#71000645)	27 Broadway; 41°38′36″N 83°32′18″W	Toledo	
82	Sumner Street Bridge		August 26, 2024 (#100010713)	150 Segur Ave. 41°38′16″N 83°32′40″W	Toledo	
83	Toledo Central Business Historic District	Toledo Central Business Historic District	March 21, 2022 (#100007510)	Roughly bounded by Madison Ave., the Maumee R., Adams, Jackson, Cherry, Summit, Monroe, 10th, and Michigan Sts. 41°39′07″N 83°32′16″W	Toledo	
84	Toledo City Market	Toledo City Market	September 8, 2022 (#100008069)	201-237 South Erie St. 41°38′45″N 83°32′37″W	Toledo	
85	Toledo Club	Toledo Club	December 1, 1978 (#78002127)	14th St. and Madison Ave. 41°39′20″N 83°32′40″W	Toledo	
86	Toledo Harbor Light	Toledo Harbor Light	August 4, 1983 (#83002005)	Toledo Harbor; 41°43′04″N 83°25′17″W	Jerusalem Township	
87	Toledo Olde Towne Historic District	Toledo Olde Towne Historic District	September 21, 1989 (#89001454)	Roughly bounded by Central Ave., Cherry St., Franklin Ave., Bancroft St., and Collingwood Ave. 41°40′04″N 83°32′59″W	Toledo	
88	Toledo Traction Company Power Station	Toledo Traction Company Power Station	June 19, 2003 (#03000555)	300 Water St. 41°39′02″N 83°31′57″W	Toledo	
89	Toledo Yacht Club	Toledo Yacht Club	December 12, 1976 (#76001476)	Bay View Park; 41°41′35″N 83°28′32″W	Toledo	
90	Trinity Episcopal Church	Trinity Episcopal Church	December 29, 1983 (#83004317)	316 Adams St. 41°39′10″N 83°32′00″W	Toledo	
91	United States Courthouse and Custom House	United States Courthouse and Custom House	July 17, 2013 (#13000501)	1716 Spielbusch Ave. 41°39′27″N 83°32′10″W	Toledo	
92	Uptown Toledo Historic District	Uptown Toledo Historic District	June 20, 2023 (#100009042)	Roughly bounded by 10th St, Michigan St, Spielbusch Ave, Canton St, Southard Ave, alley to the northeast of Adams St, Adams St, Woodruff Ave, 21st St, 18th St, Brookwood Ave, and Washington St. 41°39′32″N 83°32′24″W	Toledo	
93	Valentine Theater Building	Valentine Theater Building	May 19, 1987 (#87000686)	405-419 Saint Clair and 402-412 Adams; 41°39′11″N 83°32′01″W	Toledo	
94	Vistula Historic District	Vistula Historic District	December 6, 1978 (#78002128)	Roughly bounded by Champlain, Summit, Walnut and Magnolia Sts. 41°38′32″N 83°30′26″W	Toledo	
95	Waterville Commercial District	Waterville Commercial District	December 12, 1976 (#76001477)	3rd St. 41°29′59″N 83°43′12″W	Waterville	
96	Webster School		January 3, 2025 (#100011235)	424 E. Manhattan Boulevard; 41°41′10″N 83°32′08″W	Toledo	
97	West Sister Island Light	West Sister Island Light	August 4, 1983 (#83002006)	West Sister Island; 41°44′13″N 83°06′38″W	Jerusalem Township	
98	Westmoreland Historic District	Westmoreland Historic District	February 3, 1986 (#86000208)	Roughly bounded by Parkside Boulevard, Bancroft St., Upton Ave., and Oakwood Ave. and Allenby Rd. 41°39′35″N 83°35′29″W	Toledo	
99	Woodlawn Cemetery	Woodlawn Cemetery	November 19, 1998 (#98001396)	1502 W. Central Ave. 41°40′53″N 83°34′46″W	Toledo	
100	Dr. John A. Wright House	Dr. John A. Wright House	October 5, 1978 (#78002129)	1822 Cherry St. 41°39′58″N 83°32′22″W	Toledo	
101	Yondota Historic District	Yondota Historic District	August 8, 1996 (#96000833)	Roughly bounded by Oak, 2nd, Euclid, Starr, White, Delence, and Nevada; 41°38′38″N 83°31′16″W	Toledo	

== Former listings ==
	Name on the Register	Image	Date listed	Date removed	Location	City or town	Description
1	Manhattan Building		June 10, 1975 (#75001470)	May 5, 1983	518 Jefferson Ave	Toledo	
2	Henry Philipps House		February 23, 1972 (#72001031)	1981	220 Columbia St	Toledo	Destroyed by fire in 1980
3	St. Paul's United Methodist Church	St. Paul's United Methodist Church	November 2, 1978 (#78002126)	May 5, 1983	1302 Madison Ave	Toledo	Destroyed by fire in 1979
4	Toledo City Market		February 23, 1972 (#72001035)	May 5, 1983	237 S Erie St	Toledo	
5	Toledo News Bee Building		February 23, 1972 (#72001034)	May 5, 1983	604 Jackson St	Toledo	Demolished in the early 1980s
6	Wheeler Block	Wheeler Block	May 29, 1975 (#75001473)	October 29, 1985	402 Monroe St	Toledo	

== See also ==
- List of National Historic Landmarks in Ohio
- Listings in neighboring counties: Fulton, Henry, Lenawee (MI), Monroe (MI), Ottawa, Wood
- National Register of Historic Places listings in Ohio
