= Vistula (disambiguation) =

The Vistula (Polish: Wisła) is the chief river of Poland.

Vistula or Wisła may also refer to:

== Places and locations ==
=== Poland ===
- Wisła, a town in Silesian Voivodeship close to the source of the Vistula
- Vistula Land (1815-1915), name for Russian Congress Poland from 1867 to 1915
- Vistula Spit, a stretch of land on the Baltic coast
- Vistula Lagoon, a fresh-water lagoon behind the Vistula Spit

=== United States ===
- Vistula, Michigan, a former town in what is now the city of Toledo, Ohio
- Vistula Historic District, the former town in Toledo, Ohio
- Vistula, Indiana, an unincorporated village northeast of Elkhart, Indiana

== Military units ==
- Vistula legion was a unit of Poles in the service of Napoleonic France
- German Army Group Vistula, a German military unit in World War II

== Football ==
- Wisła Kraków, a Polish football club from Kraków
- Wisła Płock, a Polish football club from Płock

== Other uses ==
- Operation Vistula, code name for a Polish army operation displacing Ukrainians and Ruthenians in Poland after World War II
- Battle of Warsaw (1920), also known as the Miracle on the Vistula (Polish: Cud nad Wisłą)
- Tatiana Wisła, a supporting character from the anime series Last Exile
