= John N. Richards =

American architect (1904–1982)

- Born: April 23, 1904; Warren, Ohio
- Died: August 26, 1982 (aged 78); Toledo, Ohio
- Occupation: Architect

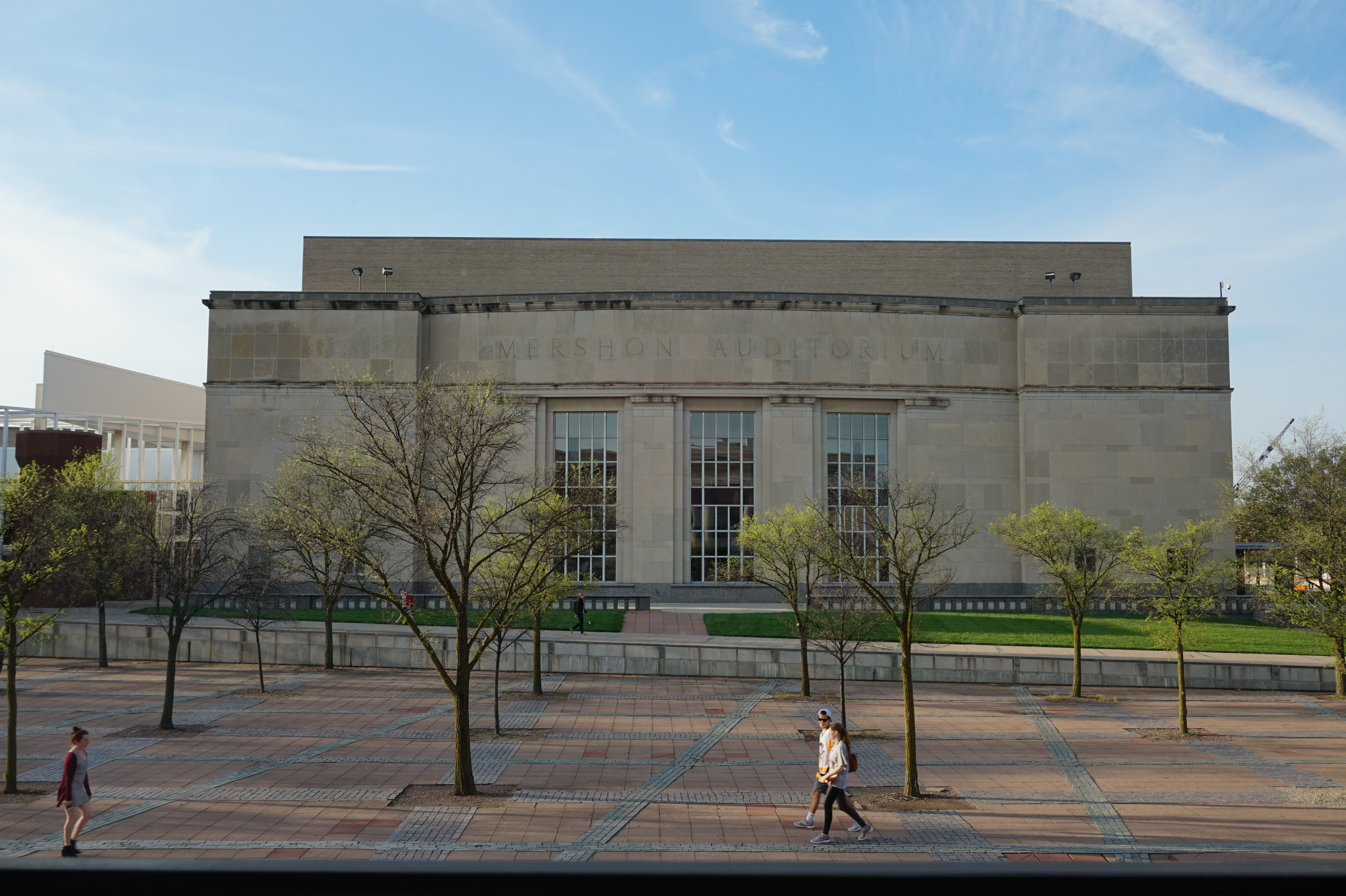
Mershon Auditorium of the Ohio State University, designed by Bellman, Gillett & Richards and completed in 1957.

John N. Richards FAIA (1904–1982) was an American architect in practice in Toledo, Ohio, from 1940 to 1976. From 1958 to 1960 he was president of the American Institute of Architects.

== Life and career ==
John Noble Richards was born April 23, 1904, in Warren, Ohio. His family moved to Toledo in 1911, where he was educated in the public schools. After his graduation he worked for the local architectural firm of Mills, Rhines, Bellman & Nordhoff before moving to Philadelphia, where he attended the architecture school of the University of Pennsylvania. He graduated with a B.Arch. in 1931. While in Philadelphia he worked for architects G. Edwin Brumbaugh, Zantzinger, Borie & Medary and Ritter & Shay before returning to Mills in Toledo in 1932. He would remain with this firm and its successors for the rest of his career. In 1940 he was made a principal in the firm, and in 1944 it was renamed Bellman, Gillett & Richards to recognize changes in leadership. His associates Lawrence S. Bellman and John Gillett died in 1951 and retired in 1954, respectively, and Richards assumed control of the firm. In 1962 the firm became Richards, Bauer & Moorhead to include Richards' new associates, Orville H. Bauer and Robert C. Moorhead. From Gillett's retirement in 1954 until his own retirement in 1976, Richards was head of the firm.

Richards joined the American Institute of Architects in 1935 as a member of the Toledo chapter, and was elected a Fellow in 1955. He served as chapter president and as second and first vice president in the national organization before being elected president in 1958. He was elected to a second term in 1959. After his presidency he was elected to honorary membership in the Royal Institute of British Architects, the Royal Architectural Institute of Canada, the Society of Architects of Mexico and the Philippine Institute of Architects. In 1977 he was awarded an honorary Doctor of Arts by Bowling Green State University and in 1980 he was elected an associate of the National Academy of Design.

== Personal life and death ==
Richards was married in 1938 to Norma Helen Haase. They lived in Ottawa Hills, where Richards was mayor from 1966 to 1972. After his retirement he and his wife traveled extensively. He died August 26, 1982, at the age of 78. In his memory the Toledo chapter of the AIA honored him with a memorial in the Toledo Botanical Garden in the form of "Small Park With Arches" by Alice Adams.

== Gallery ==
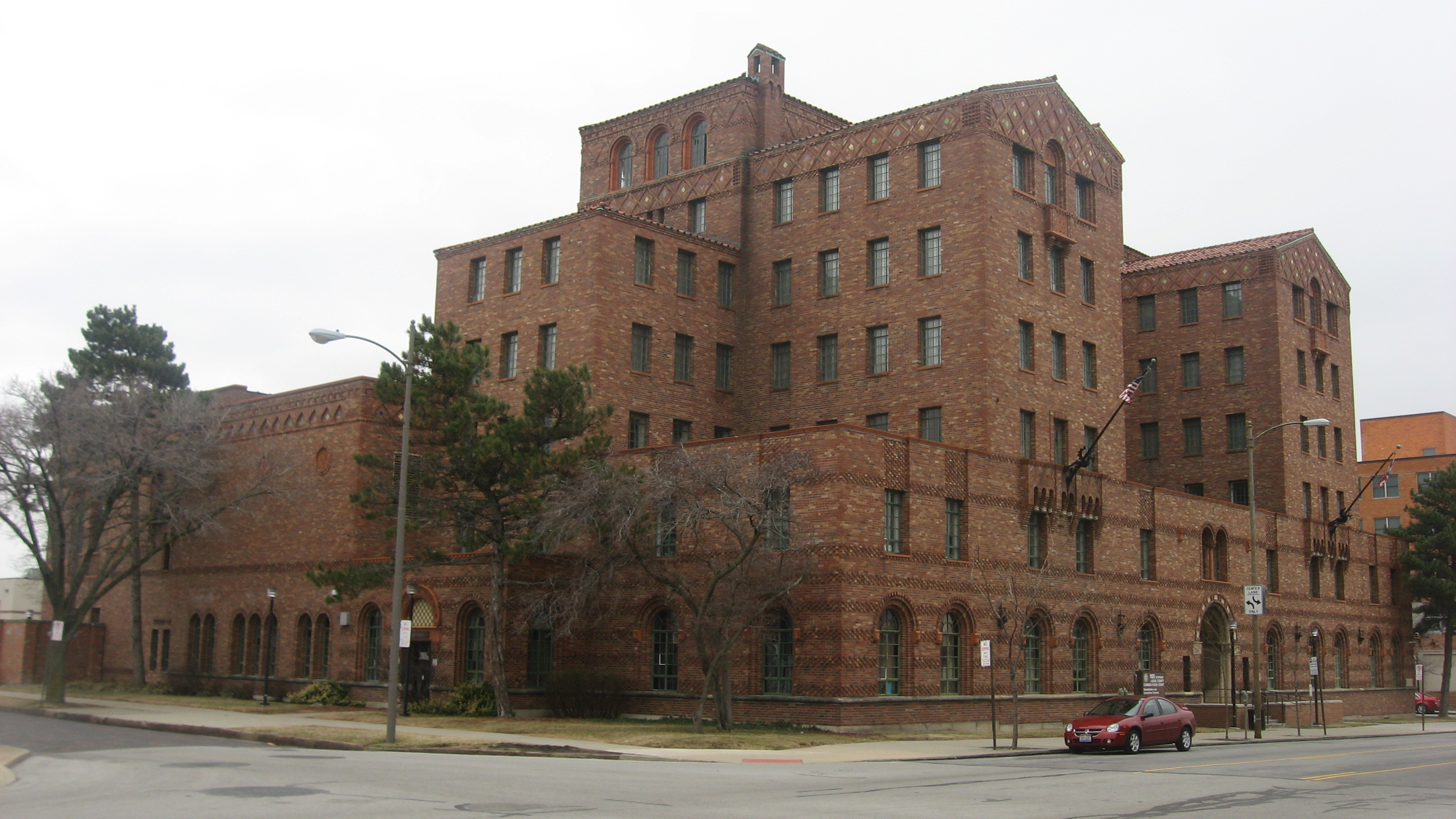
Toledo YMCA designed while with Mills, Rhines, Bellman & Nordhoff and completed in 1935

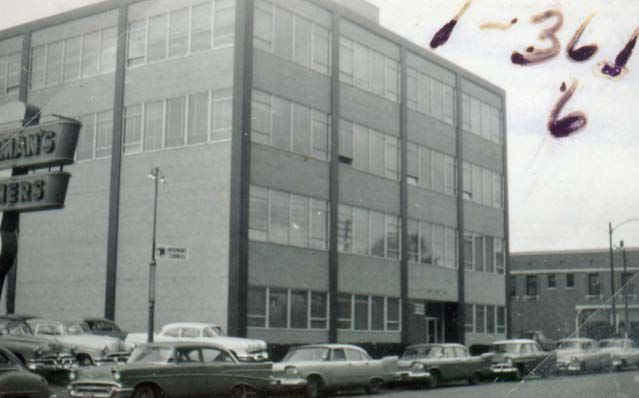
Lucas County Title Office designed while with Bauer, Stark, and Lashbrook and completed prior to 1960

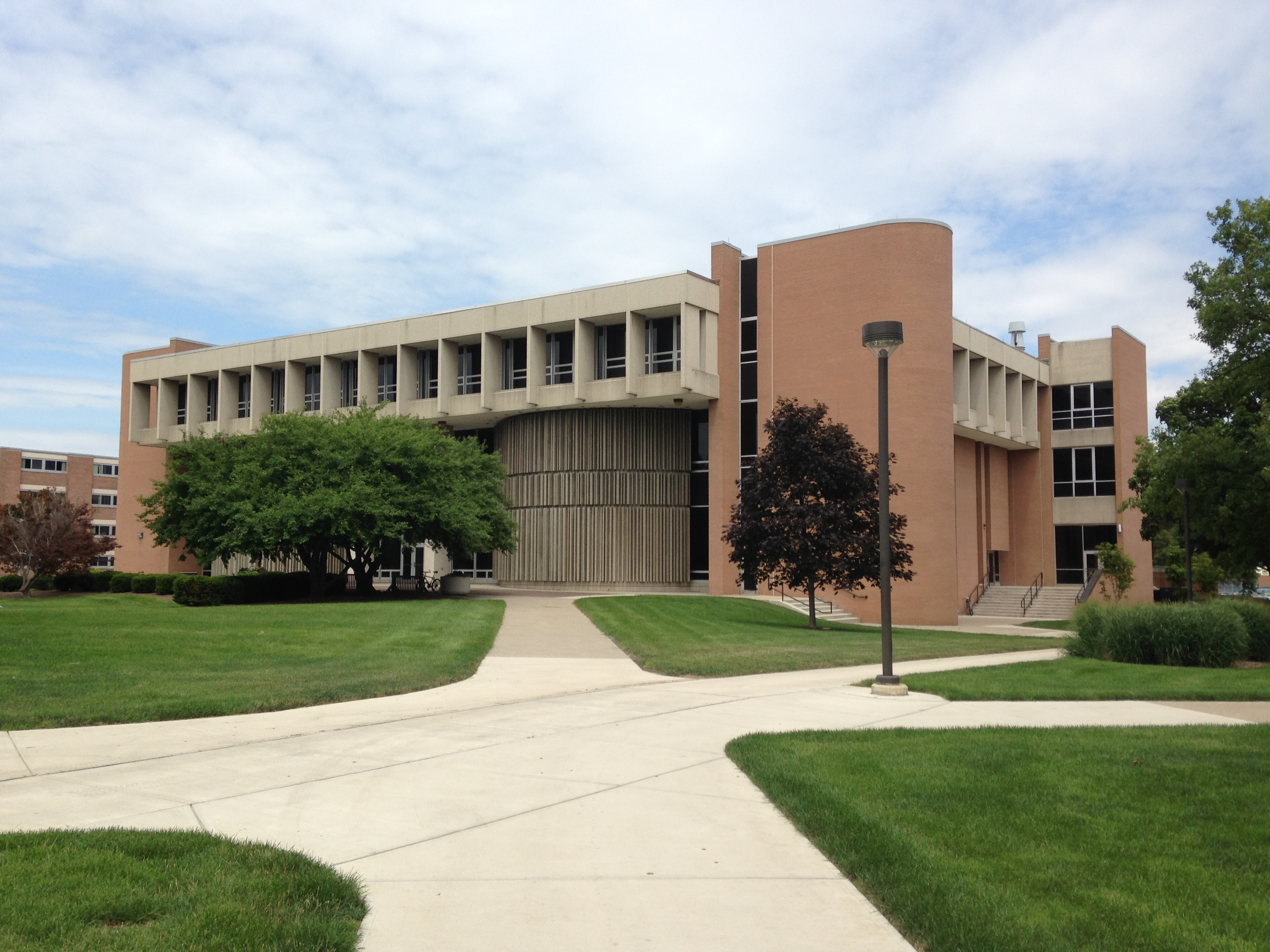
The Mathematical Sciences Building of Bowling Green State University, designed while with Richards, Bauer & Moorhead and completed in 1970.
