= Bitwise Industries =

American technology company

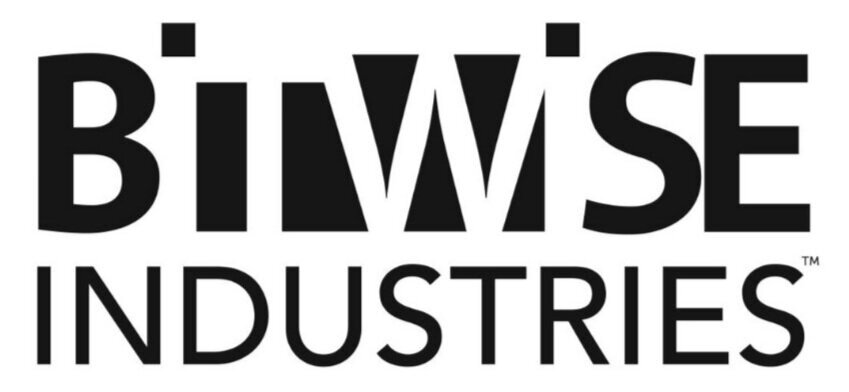

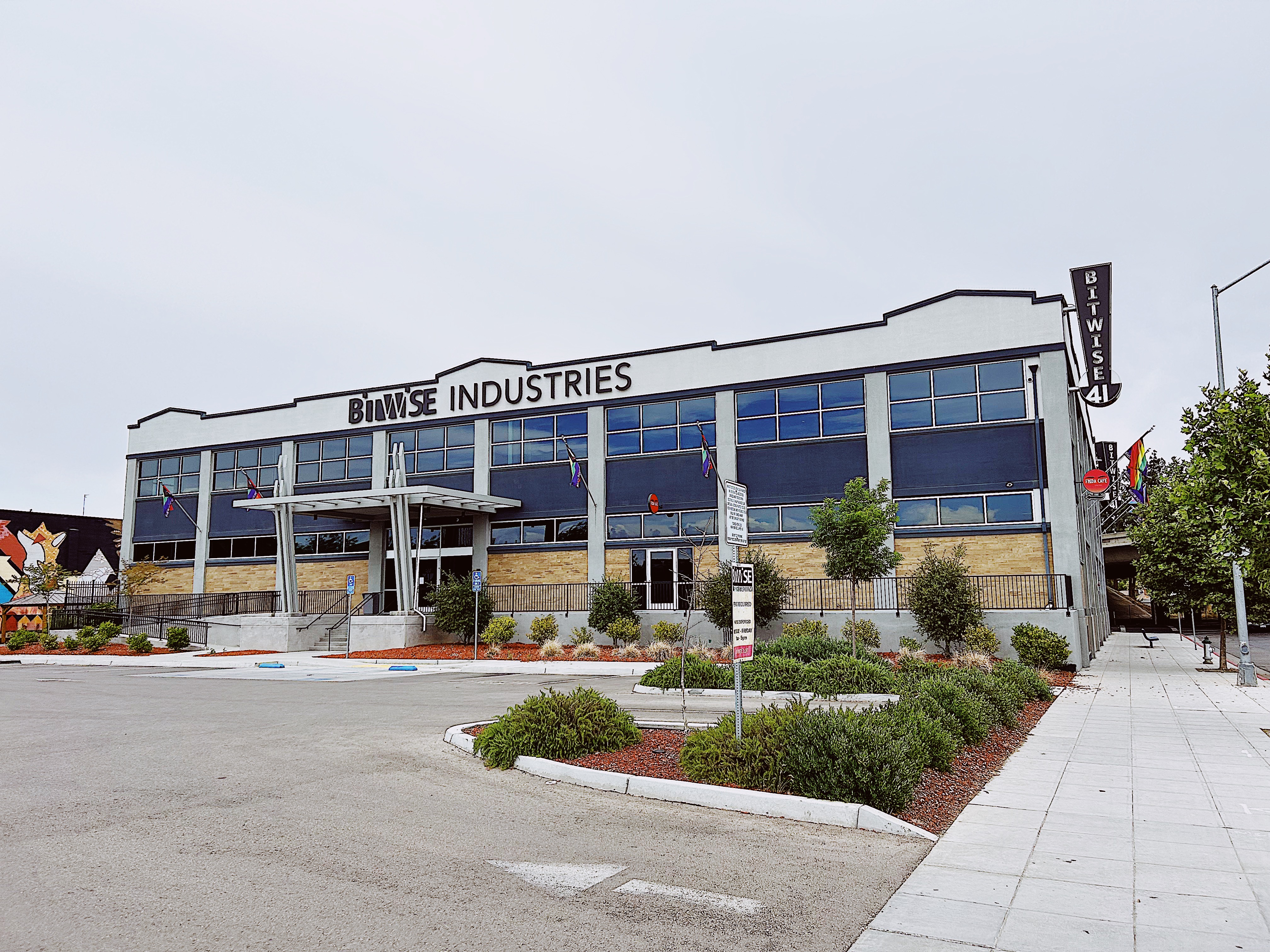
- Bitwise 41 building in Fresno
- Industry: Technology
- Founded: July 2013; 11 years ago
- Founders: Irma Olguin Jr. and Jake Soberal
- Defunct: June 29, 2023; 20 months ago
- Fate: Chapter 7 liquidation
- Headquarters: Fresno, CA
- Website: bitwiseindustries.com at the Wayback Machine (archived 31 May 2023)

Bitwise Industries was an American company focused on computer programming instruction, technology sales, and real estate operations. Founded in 2013 by Irma Olguin Jr. and Jake Soberal in Fresno, the company grew to have campuses in additional cities before furloughing its workforce and terminating the co-CEOs in June 2023. In December 2024, Olguin and Soberal pled guilty to wire fraud and wire fraud conspiracy, agreed to pay $115 million in restitution to investors, and were sentenced to 9 and 11 years respectively in federal prison.

== History ==
=== Early history ===
Fresno-based lawyer Jake Soberal worked with technology designer and instructor Irma Olguin Jr. to found Geekwise Academy in 2012, a coding boot camp organization focused on serving the underprivileged community. This boot camp grew into Bitwise Industries, officially founded in July 2013, when it purchased an 8,000 sq ft (740 m^{2}) building in downtown Fresno and leased out workspaces to small technology companies. The internal software development team was named Shift3 Technologies.

The company continued to grow, eventually purchasing a 50,000 sq ft (4,600 m^{2}) building, also in downtown Fresno, that had been empty for many years. The building had previously been a car dealership. Bitwise renovated the building to have three floors of office space, a coffee shop and a 160-seat theater and named it Bitwise South Stadium. The building opened in 2015.

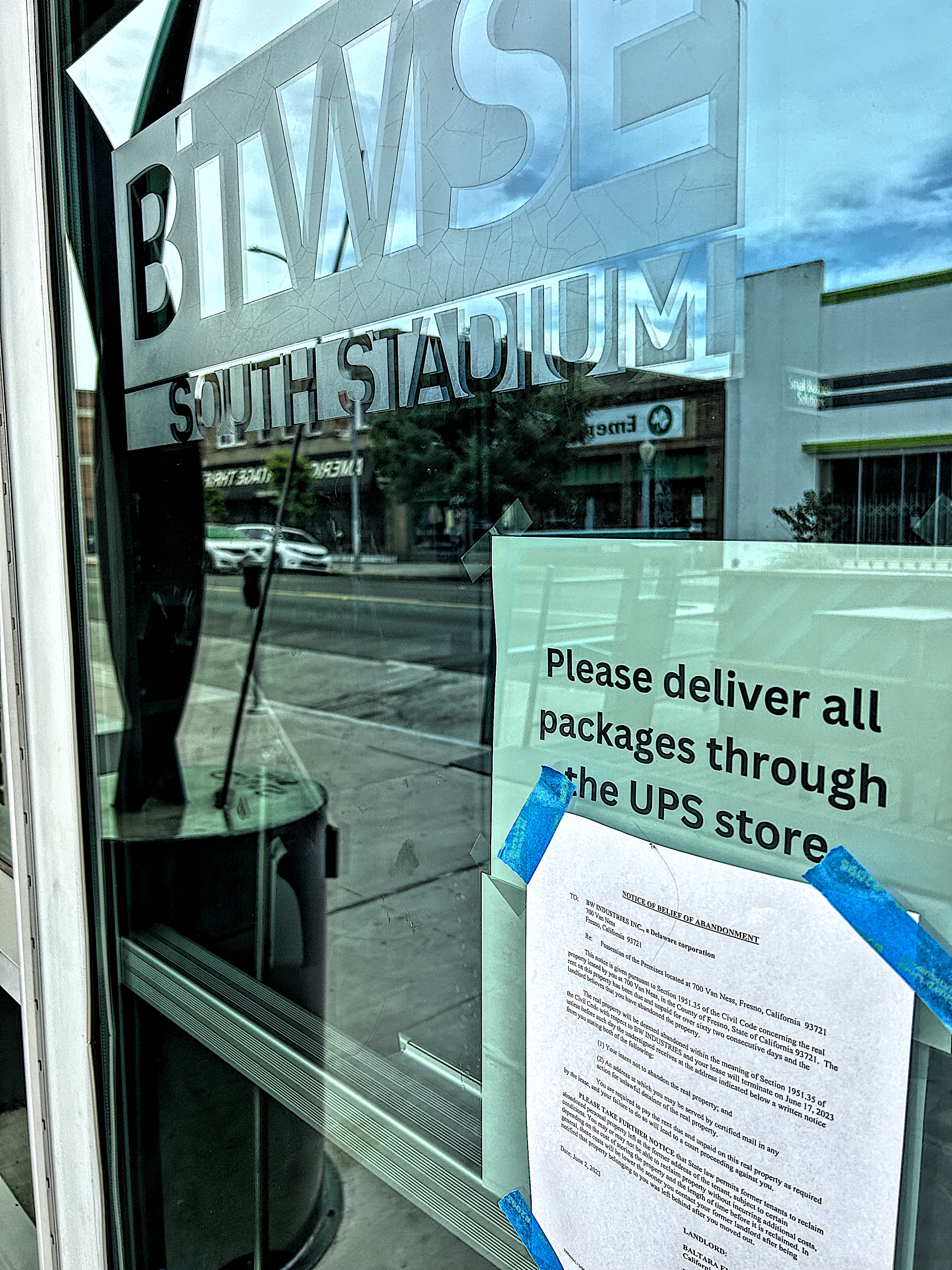
Belief of abandonment notice posted on the front door of Bitwise's South Stadium building

=== 2019 to 2024; Expansion and eventual liquidation ===
In June 2019, Bitwise received $27 million in Series A round funding to create campuses in other cities. Oakland-based Kapor Capital provided the expansion funding. In 2022, the company announced the cities in which it sought to expand, starting with renovating the Old Central Post Office in downtown Toledo, Ohio. It also began renovations in a 32,000 sq ft (3,000 m^{2}) building at on Buffalo’s East Side and in the Sotoa Building in El Paso, Texas. After the expansion, it projected to have operations in ten cities in the US.

Cash flow problems and legal issues caused Bitwise to furlough all 900 employees on May 31, 2023. On June 2, 2023, the board of directors terminated co-CEOs Irma Olguin Jr. and Jake Soberal and installed Ollen Douglass as interim president. On June 29, Bitwise entered Chapter 7 liquidation and began winding down all assets.

A lawsuit, filed on May 31, 2023, alleged that Bitwise improperly sought out loans and was unauthorized in listing properties for sale. It was filed by a Texas company that financed five Bitwise real estate acquisitions. The city of Fresno alleged that Bitwise has failed to pay taxes for two years. Reports later surfaced that Soberal misrepresented a pending large investment from Goldman Sachs in exchange for hard money loans. Former employees explored a class-action lawsuit for labor law violations.

On November 9, 2023, the U.S. Attorney's Office for the Eastern District of California announced federal wire fraud charges against Olguin and Soberal, citing $100 million in fraudulently obtained funds. In July 2024, Olguin and Soberal changed their pleas to guilty of wire fraud and wire fraud conspiracy and agreed to pay $115 million in restitution. In December 2024, a judge sentenced Soberal to 11 years in prison and Olguin to 9 years
