= Palazzo Davanzati =

Palace and museum in Florence, Italy

Coordinates: 43°46′12.45″N 11°15′10.72″E

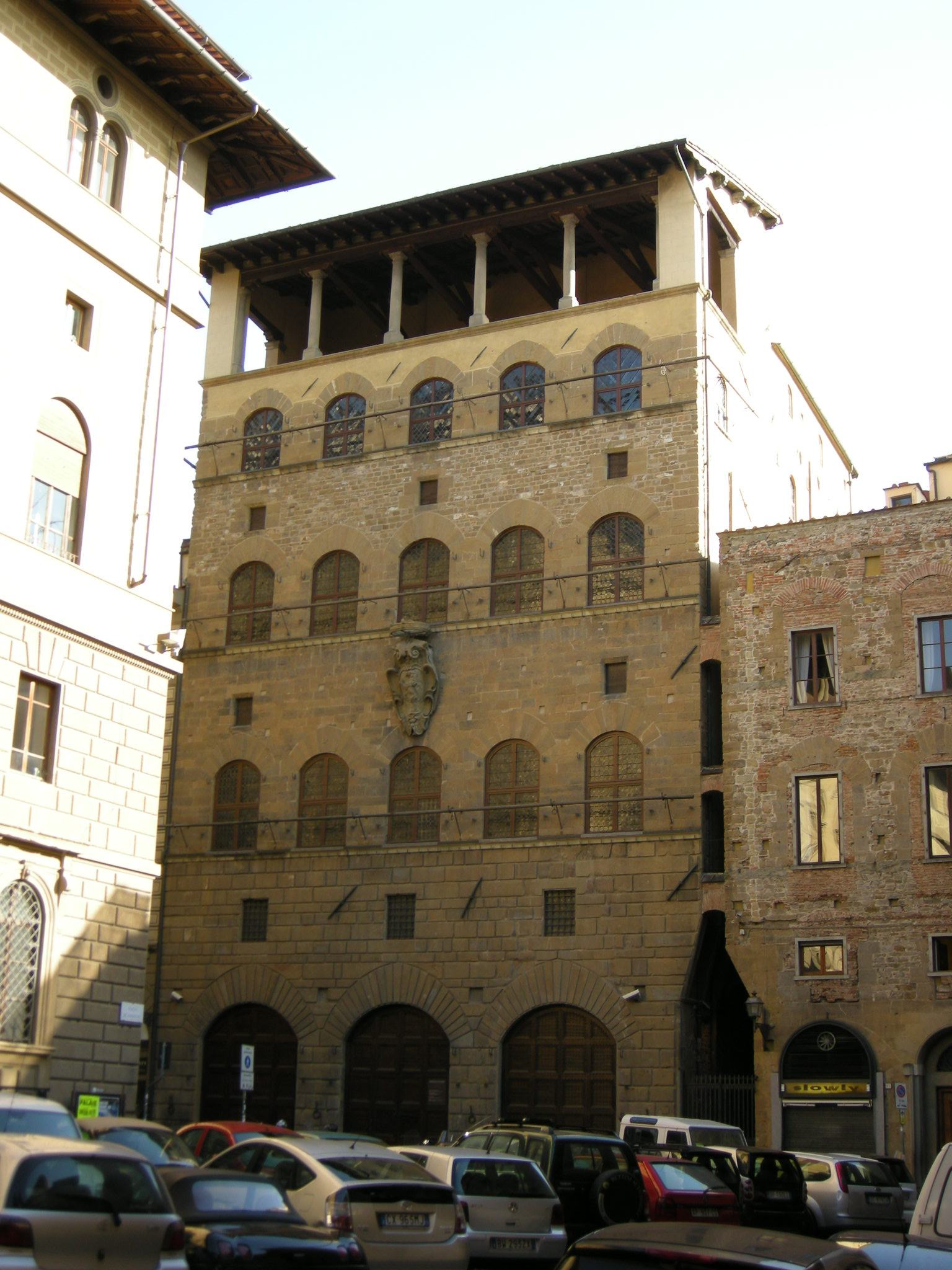
Façade of the palace.

Palazzo Davanzati is a palace in Florence, Italy. It houses the Museum of the Old Florentine House.

== History ==
Palazzo Davanzati was erected in the second half of the 14th century by the Davizzi family, who were wealthy members of the wool guild. In 1516 it was sold to the Bartolini; in 1578 it was bought by the Davanzati family, who were also rich merchants, in whose possession it remained until 1838. After the suicide of Carlo Davanzati, it was split into different quarters and modified. After escaping the numerous demolitions of 19th century Florence, it was bought by Elia Volpi, an antiquarian, who restored it in (his impression of) the original style.

In 1910, Volpi opened the building as a private museum (Museo Privato della Casa Fiorentina Antica). The contents of this museum kept changing as Volpi sold the furniture at auctions, including a major one in 1916 in New York. In the 1920s, Egyptian antique dealers Vitale and Leopoldo Bengujat acquired the building and its contents. In 1951 it was purchased by the Italian state and kept open as a museum. By 1995 the museum needed to be closed for major structural restorations; the museum was partially reopened in 2005 with the ground floor and first floor accessible; by 2012, all the floors were again open to visitors.

== Architecture ==
The palace consists of a façade that unifies a grouping of earlier, medieval tower homes that the owner purchased with the intent to put them together. It is constructed in sandstone, with three large portals on the horizontal axis, and three stories of mullioned windows. The top-most floor has a loggia that was added in the 16th century and which is supported by four columns and two pilasters. The façade displays the Davanzati coat of arms and has traces of other decorations.

The interior courtyard has 14th century-style arches, vaults, and capitals.

== Interior ==
The following rooms can be visited:

=== Ground floor: Atrium ===
Entered through one of three large portals. This large room was used to conduct business. Presently it used to display objects and information related to the history of the building.

=== Ground floor: Courtyard ===
All rooms of the building communicate onto hallways that open onto this central courtyard.

=== First floor: Great Hall ===
This large room was also used for conducting business. Its large windows are located street-side. There are three square holes with wooden covers that align with the openings of the atrium below; culminating in a street view, these holes were used to observe who was walking in, and possibly for defense purposes. The room is now set up as a museum with various 16th-century objects on display.

=== First floor: Sala dei Pappagalli (Room of the Parrots) ===
The so-called Sala dei Pappagalli has wall paintings designed to look like patchwork wall-hangings lined with miniver, with motifs of parrots painted or embroidered on the blocks. These paintings are much restored and so may not look like the original frescoes. A large fireplace dominates this room. On display is maiolica from Montelupo.

=== First floor: Bathroom ===
A small room with indoor plumbing.

=== First floor: Study (studiolo) ===
This room, which does not retain any of its original wall decoration, was probably a study. Objects on display include a forziere (locking chest), cassone, several small sculptures, and paintings.

=== First floor: Bedroom ===
The Sala dei Pavoni's frescoes show instead a false-geometrical tapestry and a row of coat of arms of families allied with the Davizzi. It is currently set up with a bed and cradle. There is a small ensuite bathroom.

=== Second floor: Bedroom ===
The bedroom of the second floor is called the Chatelain of Vergy in honor of the frescoes inspired by The Châtelaine de Vergy, a medieval romance full of love, adventure and death. In the same bedroom you can see a beautiful "Desco da Parto" painted by Scheggia, Masaccio's brother.

=== Upper floor ===
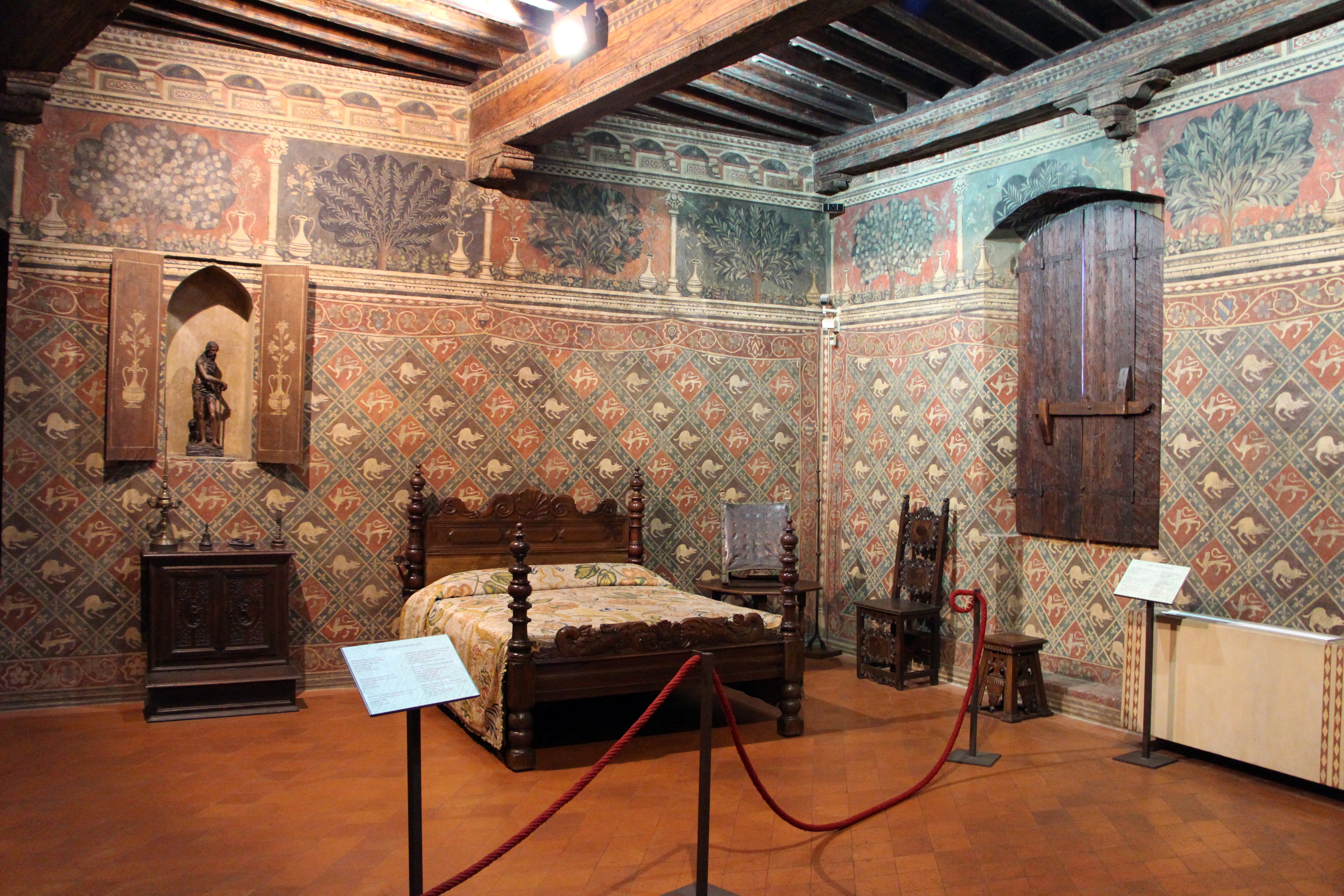
Camera delle Impannate.

Located on the third floor are the Camera delle Impannate, another bedroom, and the kitchen. The impannate were cotton or linen textile panels that were dipped in colored wax and put in a wood frame to be inserted in the windows as a substitute for glass, which was very expensive at the time.

The kitchen is at the top floor because the hot air rising from cooking stayed away from the lower living spaces in the heat of summer, and also to minimize damage in the event of an out-of-control fire. The room features a fireplace with bellows and two turnspits, a wooden bread-kneading machine, a metal butter churn and other tools dating from the Renaissance period or later.

== See also ==
- YMCA Building (Toledo, Ohio): architecture inspired by the palazzo
