= YMCA Building (Toledo, Ohio) =

Historic clubhouse in Toledo, Ohio

- Central YMCA
- U.S. National Register of Historic Places
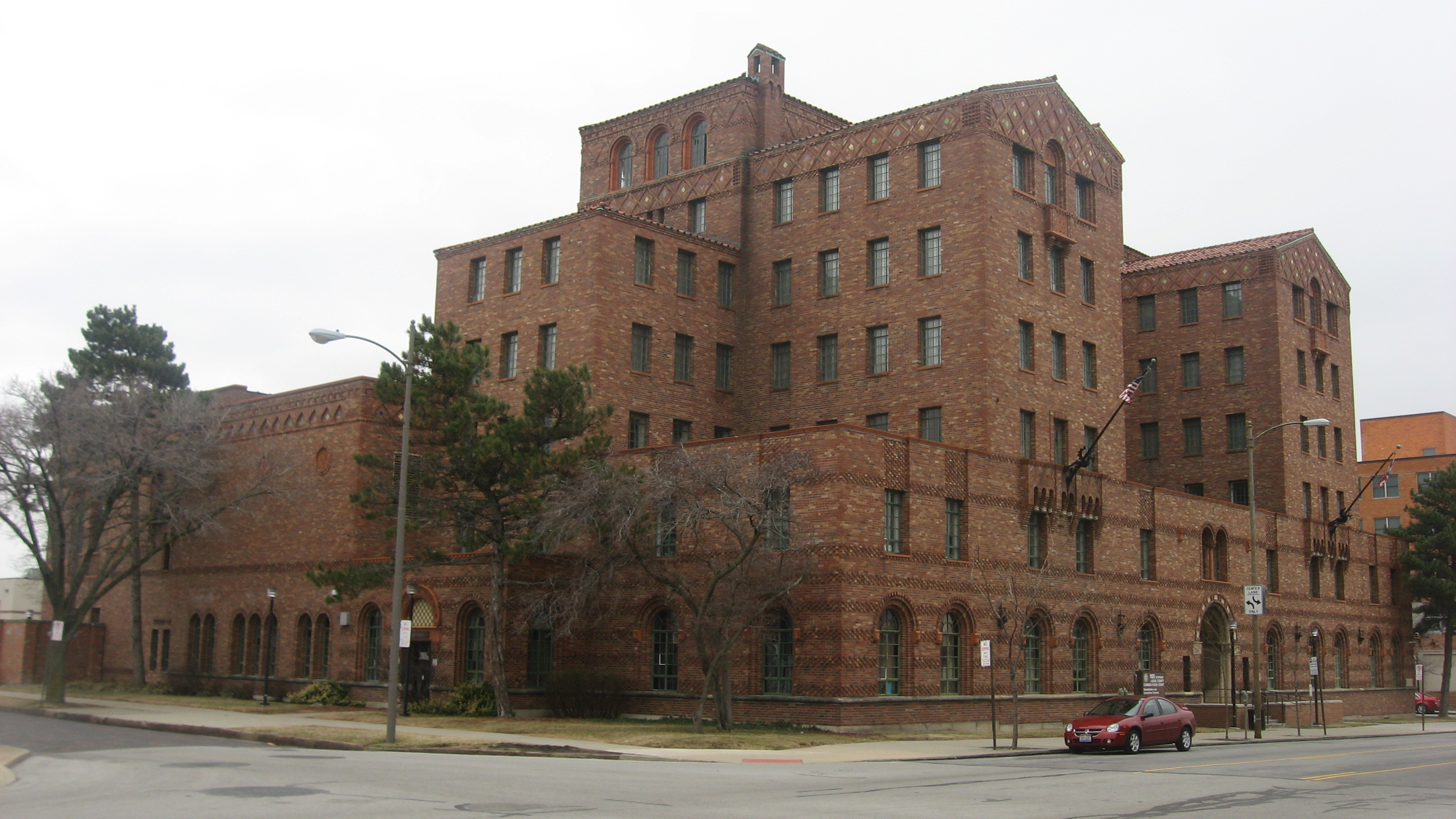
- The building in 2013 from the intersection of 12th & Jefferson

- Location within Ohio Location within the United States
- Location: 1110 Jefferson Avenue (later renumbered to 1100), Toledo, Ohio 43604
- Coordinates: 41°39′13″N 83°32′33″W
- Built: 1934-35
- Architect: John N. Richards with Mills, Rhines, Bellman & Nordhoff, Toledo
- Landscape Design: Arthur Schoene Berger and Lawrence G. Linnard with Berger & Linnard, Toledo
- Architectural style: Lombard Romanesque Revival
- NRHP reference No.: 82003610
- Added to NRHP: April 15, 1982

The YMCA Building, now known as 1100 Jefferson or the Court Services Building, is a historic building in downtown Toledo, Ohio. The National Register of Historic Places listed the former Young Men's Christian Association structure in 1982.

== History ==
The Toledo YMCA, originally founded in 1865, needed a larger location based on continued growth. Architect John N. Richards designed the building in 1930 but the Great Depression caused the design to be scaled back and delayed the start of construction until 1934. When it was completed in 1935, the complex was still sizable with 153 bedrooms, chapel, cafeteria, kitchen, laundry room, full-size pool, two full gymnasiums, six handball courts, boxing and exercise rooms, hydrotherapy massage rooms, boys social rooms, game rooms, and an assembly hall.

The total cost of construction came to $800,000 and included multiple contractors. Hugh Tyler of New York City handled the interior design, Ingalls Stone Company of Bedford, Indiana provided the stone, the Winkle Terra Cotta Company of St. Louis produced the terra cotta based on designs from Parducci Studios of Detroit.

The dormitories closed in the 1970s and the YMCA left the rest of the facility in 1980. The group donated their historical records to the archives at Bowling Green State University. In 1981, a group called the Downtown Athletic Club bought the building with intentions to renovate it.

Later, the Lucas County Government converted the space into 140 units of community-based treatment for people with nonviolent felony convictions and substance abuse disorders. In 2018, that program began to move to the Toledo Correctional Institution in phases, so that it could expand to 200 beds. The county regional court services now operate out of the building to support the nearby Lucas County Courthouse.

In 2017, a new downtown YMCA opened 37 years after the closure of the Central YMCA. That facility at 300 North Summit Street is part of the new ProMedica headquarters complex along the Maumee River.

== Architecture ==
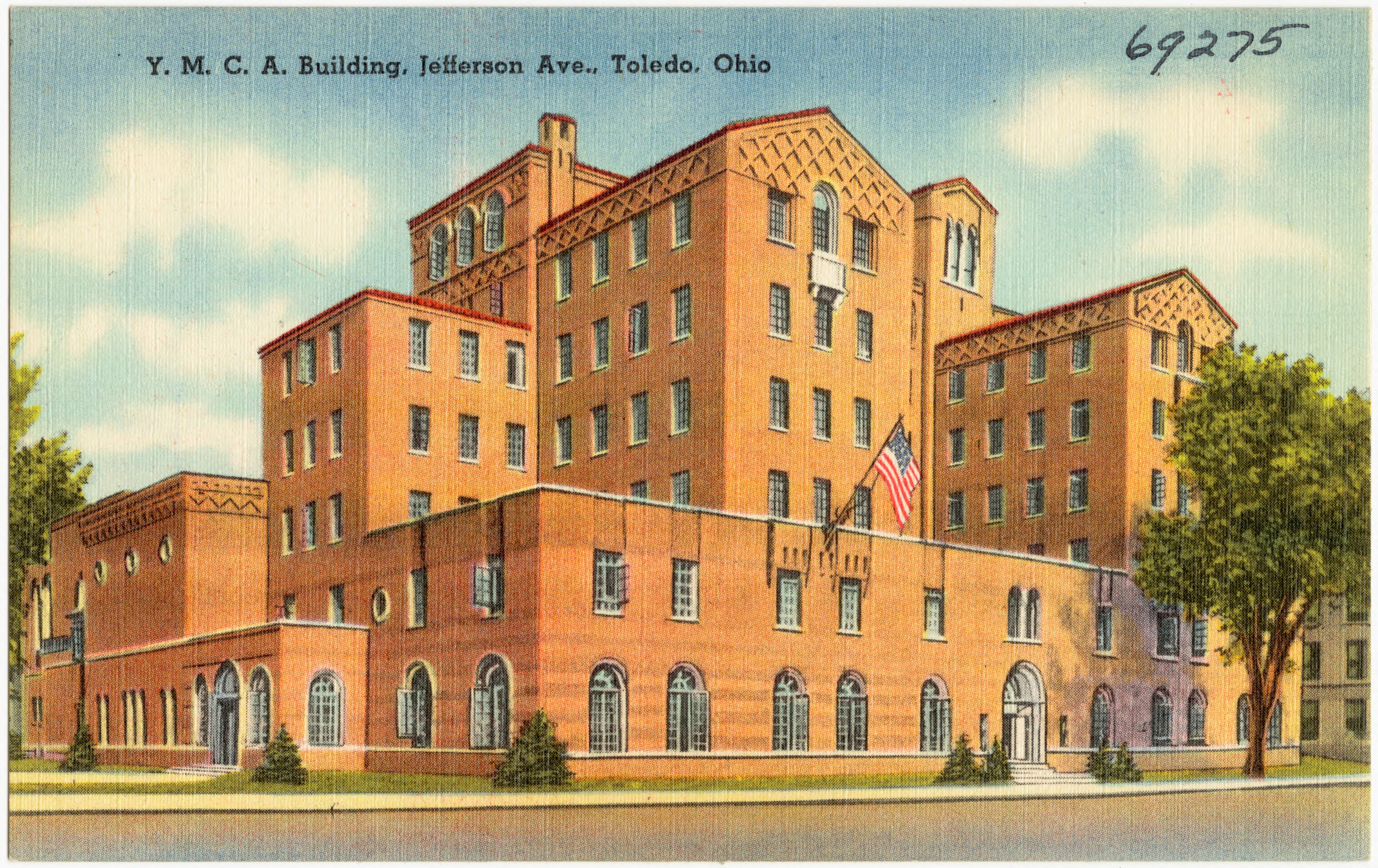
Antique postcard, c. 1930-1945

The Palazzo Davanzati of Florence, Italy served as the inspiration for the Romanesque Revival building. The asymmetrical building consists of a two-story base for offices and social spaces with athletics in the back topped by a pair of four-story dormitory towers.

Polychrome bricks in various geometric patterns cover the outside of the building including prominent diaper work running along the top the building. Multi-colored clay pan-tile covers all the multiple rooflines above heavy brick cornices. The sides have round oculi windows while the rear has blind arcades at the first-floor level.

The main entrance facing Jefferson Avenue consists of stone, brick and a tile with tympanum filled with geometric patterns. A stone medallion depicting St. George slaying the dragon is above. The "Boy's Entrance" facing 12th Street mirrors the main entrance but with terra cotta panels. A wrought-iron griffin flag standard is between the entrances.

== See also ==
- List of YMCA buildings
- National Register of Historic Places listings in Lucas County, Ohio
