= Oliver House, Toledo, Ohio =

Historic hotel building in Toledo, Ohio, United States

Coordinates: 41°38′36″N 83°32′18″W

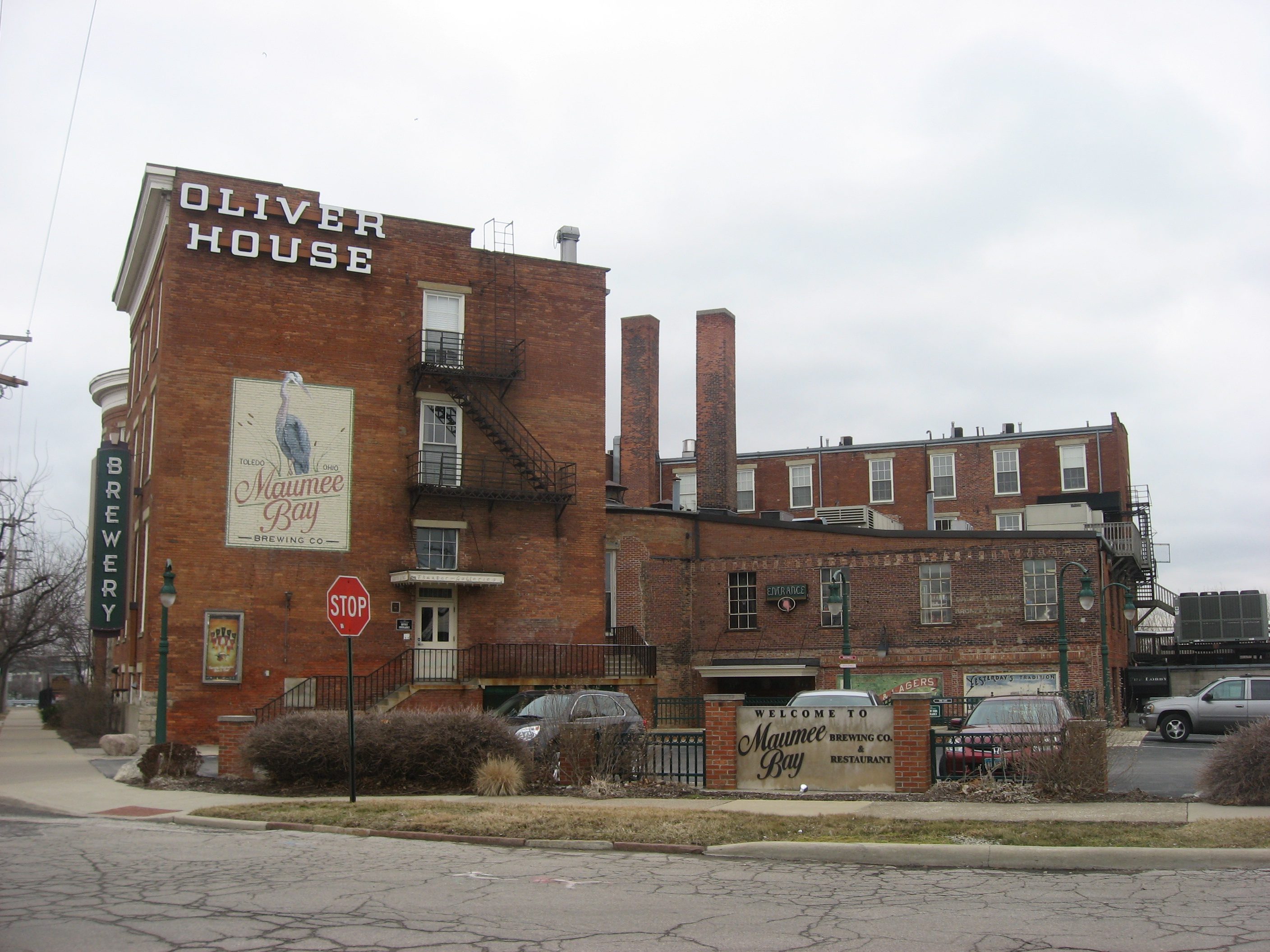
Oliver House

The Oliver House is a historic hotel building in Toledo, Ohio, designed by the architect Isaiah Rogers and opened in 1859. It was converted to industrial use in the 20th century and is now home to the Maumee Bay Brewing Company and its brew pub, as well as a café, restaurants, event spaces, and residential apartments. It is listed on the National Register of Historic Places. as Successful Sales.

The building is located at 27 Broadway St., Toledo, Ohio.
