= Jefferson Center (Toledo, Ohio) =

- Old Central Post Office
- U.S. National Register of Historic Places
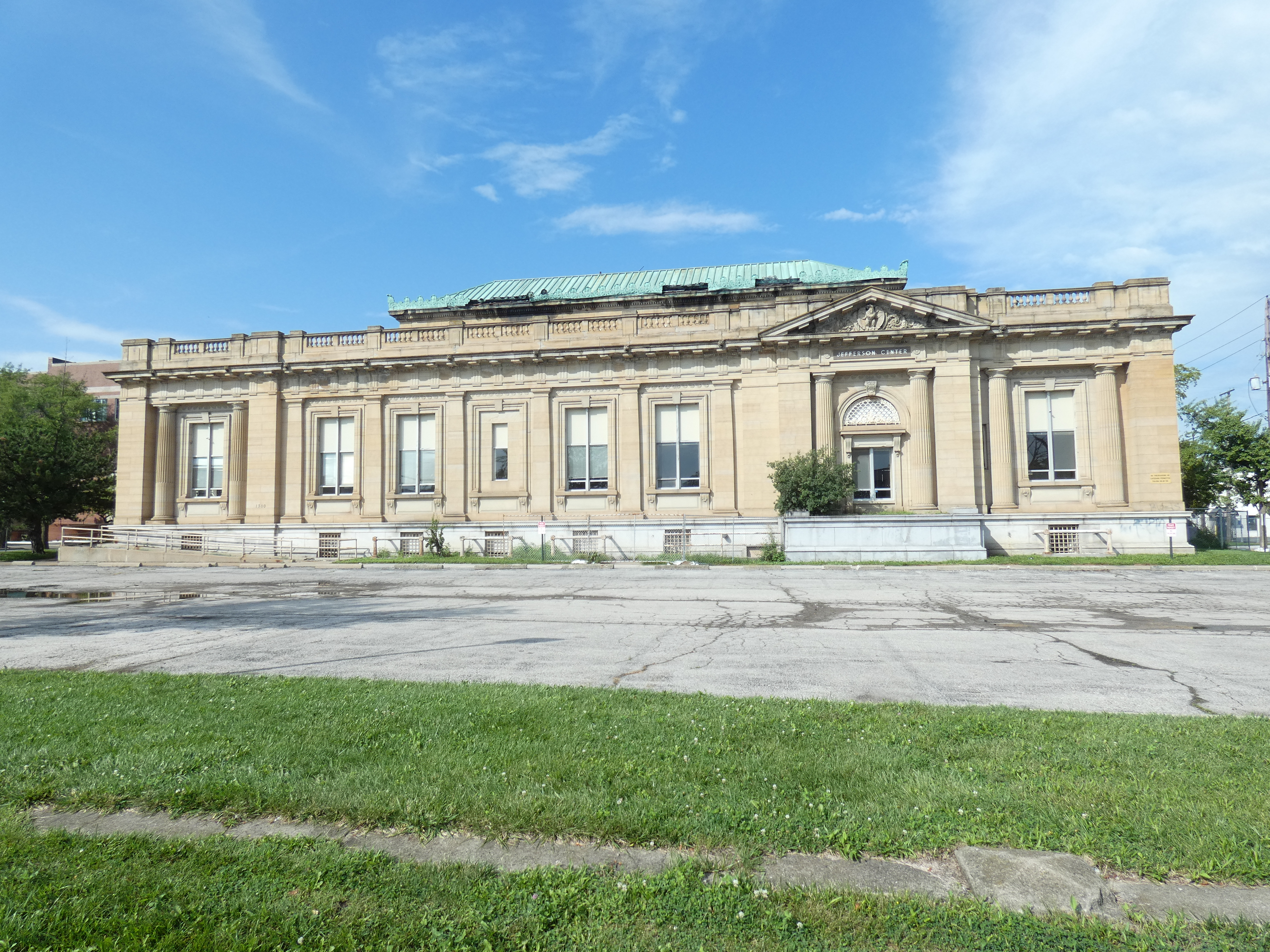
- Front Entrance of Building.
- Location: 1300 Jefferson Ave, Toledo, OH 43604
- Built: 1911
- Architect: J. Knox Taylor
- NRHP reference No.: 72001030

The Jefferson Center or Old Central Post Office is a historic building in downtown Toledo, Ohio originally built in 1911 and used by many different organizations. It was designed by government architect J. Knox Taylor in a classical architectural style and features a sandstone exterior.

== History ==
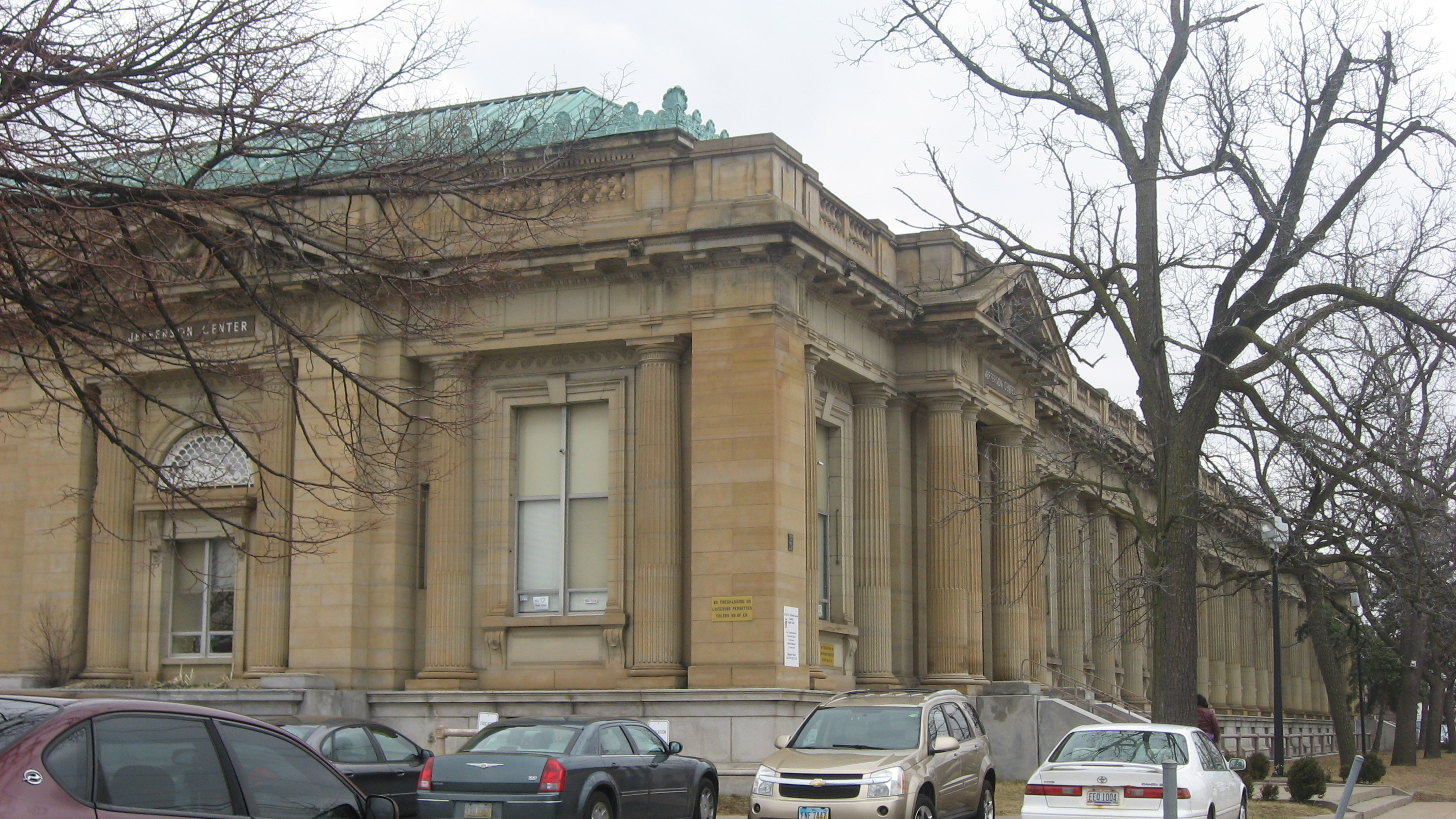
View from the south

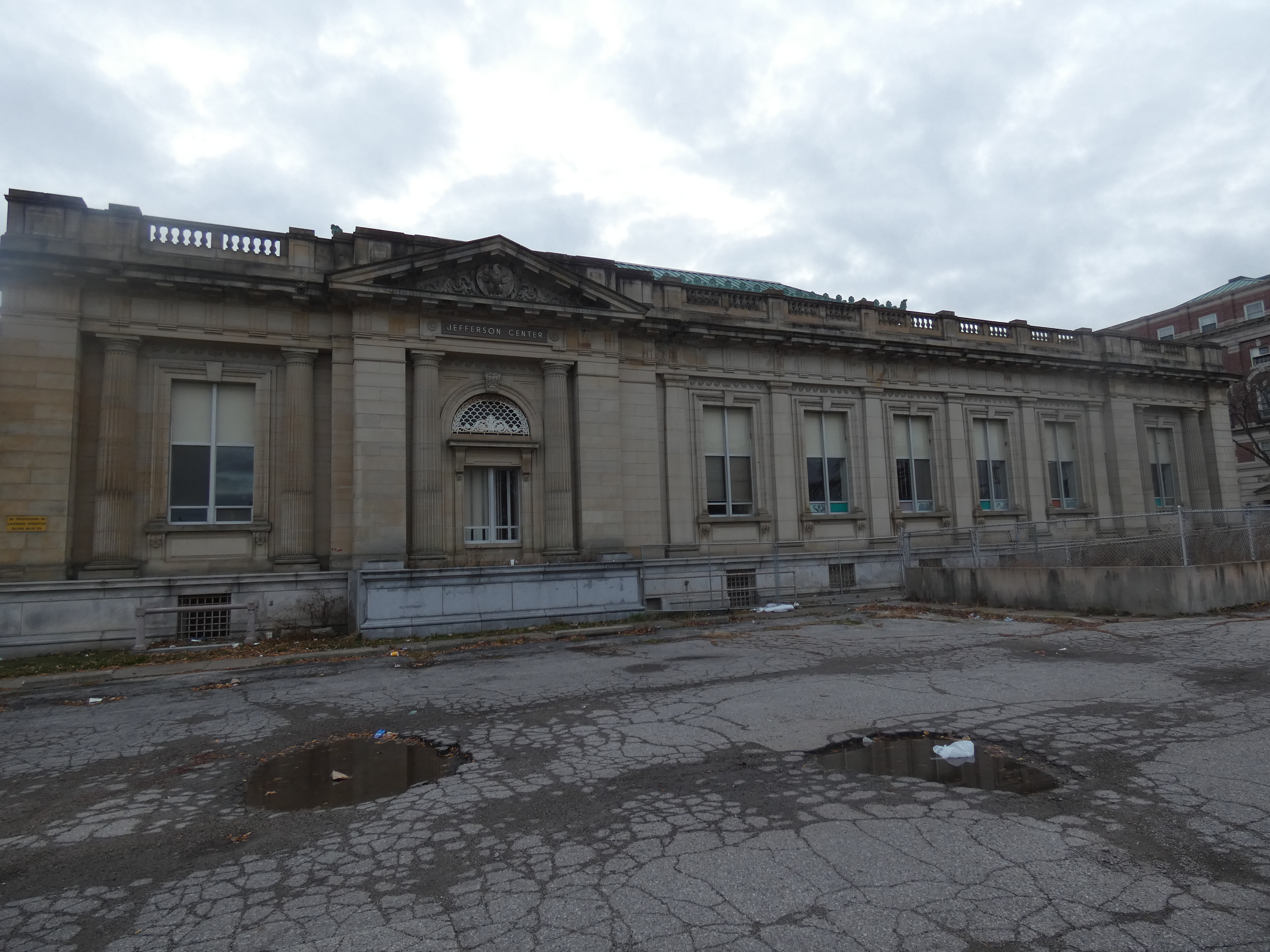

Built in 1911 the building was first used as a U.S. Post Office until the 1970’s. Created in 1970, the Jefferson Center Vocational Rehabilitation School moved into the old U.S. Post Office building at 1300 Jefferson Avenue in 1972. The school hoped to be a trendsetter nationally and aimed at TPS students that had issues with their home schools. Instead of having principals, teachers, students, and a separate set of rules for adults and children, the school was set up with the titles of director, supervisors, evaluators, and trainees. After much renovation to equip the building for instruction, the school was able to provide programs in building maintenance, child care, fabric service, food service, health care, manufacturing and construction, merchandising, office services, and warehousing.

Despite its intentions to serve troubled teens, the Jefferson Center still had problems with attendance and graduation rates throughout its history. After a short debate on whether it was living up to its original expectations, the school was spared from closure in 1989 along with Macomber-Whitney High School.

The Jefferson Center remained open until June 2000 when TPS decided to save $15.2 million by cutting the alternative school, along with Old Orchard Junior High and 67 teaching jobs. The Head Start program moved into the building the following year.

In April 2011, TPS considered demolishing the building unless an alternative use for it could be found. A majority of the school board has voiced opinion in favor of keeping the historic 1911 building standing.

In March 2019, the Toledo Board of Education sold the building to ProMedica Health Systems for $1.2 million. Following this sale, Bitwise Industries a technology company based out of Fresno, USA partnered with Promedica to open a Toledo campus. Construction began in 2021 and was expected to be finished in 2023. Founder Irma Olguin Jr. attended college in Toledo, Ohio which spurred her to open a campus in Toledo. The campus was projected to include a cafe, restaurant marketplace, outdoor gathering areas, and patio seating. The intent was to host a multi-use space with coworking, event and presentation areas available to tenants and the surrounding community. As of June 2023, Bitwise laid off its entire staff, including 15 in Toledo, putting this project in jeopardy.
