= Ashland Avenue Baptist Church =

Historic church in Toledo, Ohio, United States

- U.S. National Register of Historic Places
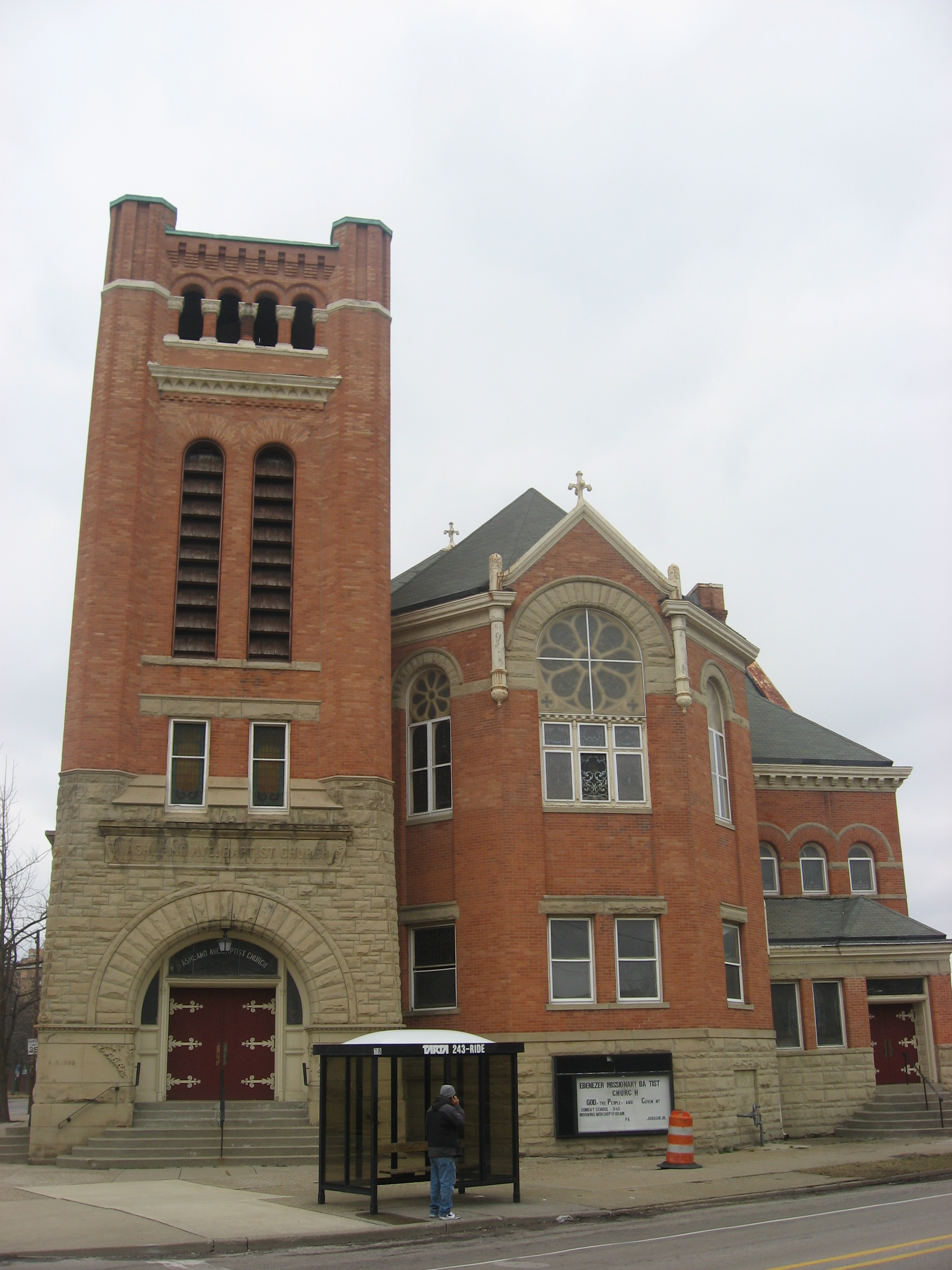
- Front of the church

- Location within Ohio Location within the United States
- Location: Ashland and Woodruff Sts., Toledo, Ohio
- Coordinates: 41°39′37.55″N 83°32′56.88″W
- Architect: Sidell & Miller and David L. Stine
- Architectural style: Romanesque
- NRHP reference No.: 80003144
- Added to NRHP: 1980-11-26

Ashland Avenue Baptist Church is a registered historic church building in Toledo, Ohio.

== History ==
The Ashland Avenue Baptist Church was organized in 1886 by a group of Sunday School workers. The building was designed by architect David L. Stine and dedicated in 1896. It was added to the National Register of Historic Places on November 26, 1980. In 2005 the congregation voted to sell the building to Ebenezer Missionary Baptist Church, and moved first to Holland, Ohio then to Oregon, Ohio where it is now called Ashland Church.
