= Vistula Historic District =

Historic district in Ohio, United States

- U.S. National Register of Historic Places
- U.S. Historic district
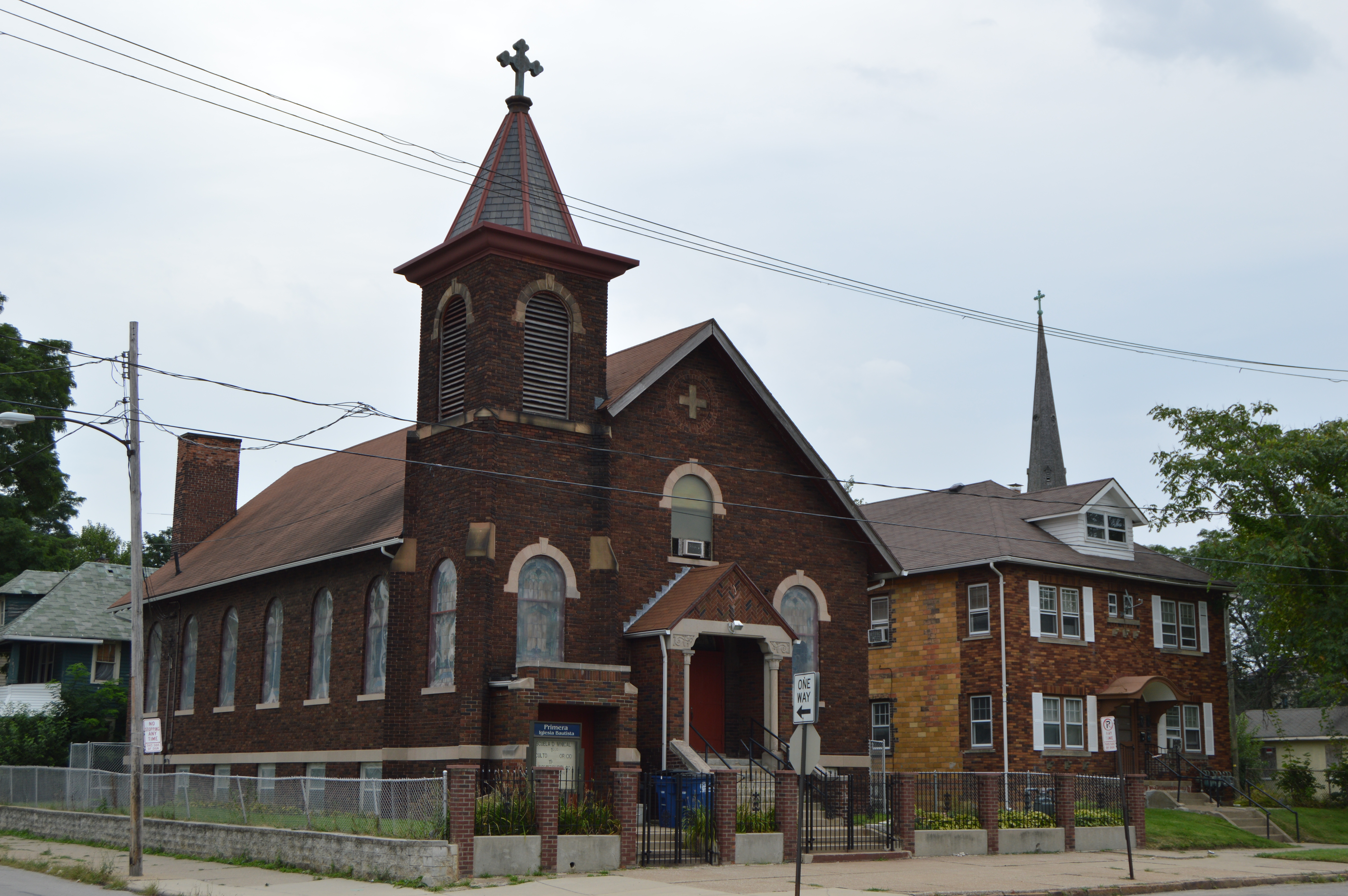
- Junction of Elm and Erie Streets

- Location within Ohio Location within the United States
- Location: Roughly bounded by Champlain, Summit, Walnut and Magnolia Sts., Toledo, Ohio
- Coordinates: 41°39′28″N 83°31′36″W
- Area: 114 acres (46 ha)
- Built: 1832
- Architectural style: Mid 19th Century Revival, Italianate, Queen Anne
- NRHP reference No.: 78002128
- Added to NRHP: December 6, 1978

Vistula Historic District is a designated historic district in the city of Toledo, Ohio, USA, listed on the National Register of Historic Places. The district comprises Toledo's oldest extant neighborhood and encompasses an area roughly bounded by Champlain, Summit, Walnut and Magnolia streets.

Vistula was a village established on land in what was then part of Michigan Territory, purchased in 1832 by Benjamin F. Stickney, in company with several investors from Lockport, New York, including Edward Bissell. In January 1833, Stickney platted the village of Vistula.

Another settlement, named Port Lawrence, had first been established in 1817, although the companies arranging sales of the land failed and nothing much was developed until a new plat was recorded for the village in 1833. This area encompassed roughly east to west from Jefferson to Washington Street and north to south, from Superior Street to the river, or slightly further upstream from where the Vistula settlement would later be established.

When Vistula and Port Lawrence merged to form the city of Toledo in 1837, the area which had been contested between Michigan and Ohio in the Toledo War was granted to Ohio by the United States Congress. In 1857, Salem Lutheran Church, the oldest Lutheran church in Toledo, was founded.
