= Ohio State Route 295 =

State highway in northwestern Ohio, US

State Route 295

Route information
- Maintained by ODOT
- Length: 24.00 mi (38.62 km)
- Existed: 1932–present

Major junctions
- South end: SR 65 near Grand Rapids
- US 24 near Grand Rapids; SR 64 near Whitehouse; US 20A near Swanton; SR 2 near Swanton; US 20 / SR 120 near Berkey
- North end: Michigan State Line in Berkey

Location
- Country: United States
- State: Ohio
- Counties: Wood, Lucas

Highway system
- Ohio State Highway System; Interstate; US; State; Scenic
← SR 294	→ SR 296

State Route 295 (SR 295) is a north–south state highway in northwestern Ohio, a U.S. state. Its southern terminus is an intersection with SR 65 in Grand Rapids. Its northern terminus is at the Michigan State Line in Berkey. The roadway continues into Michigan as county-maintained Silberhorn Highway.

== Route description ==
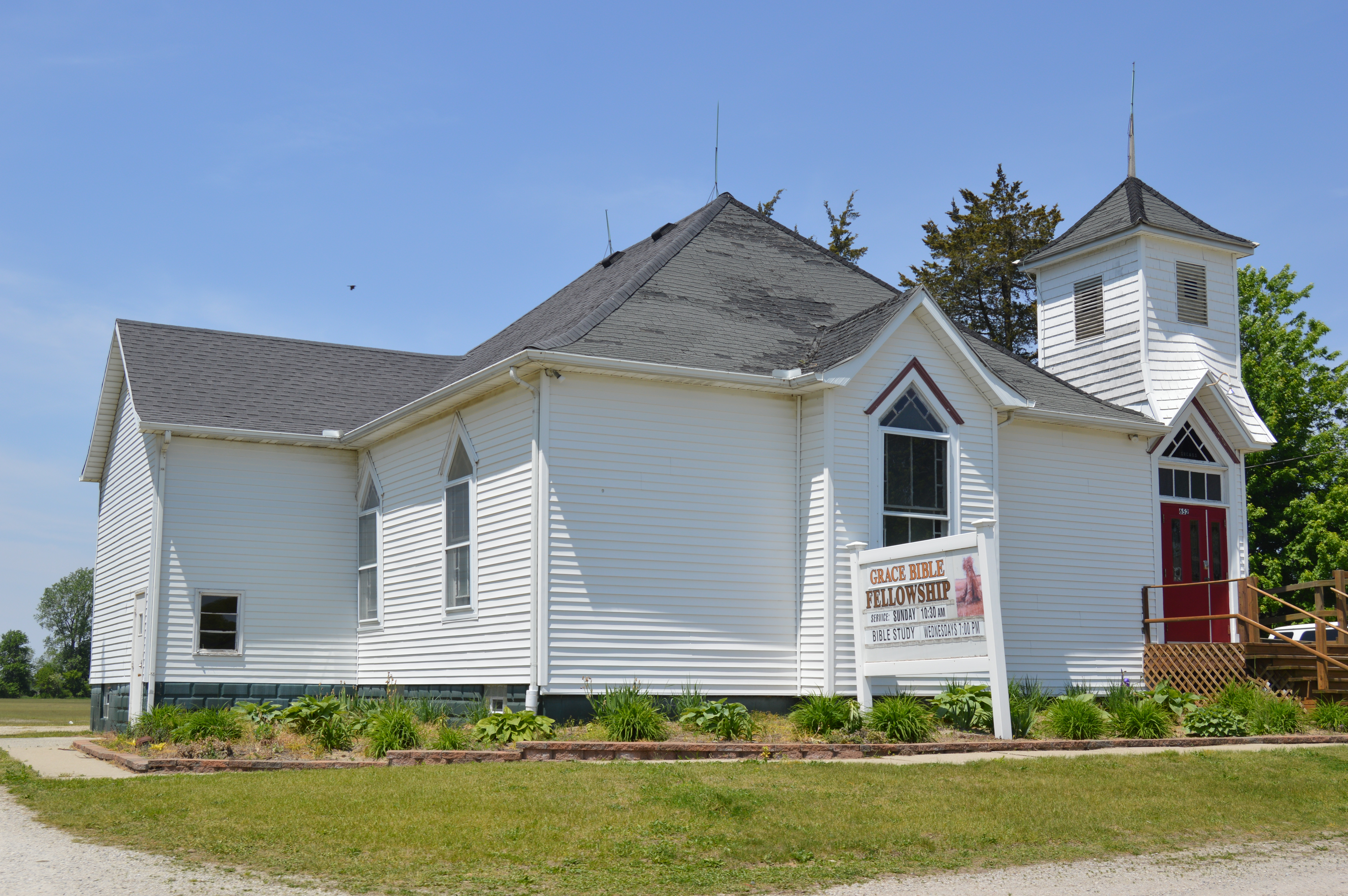
Grace Bible Fellowship in Harding Township

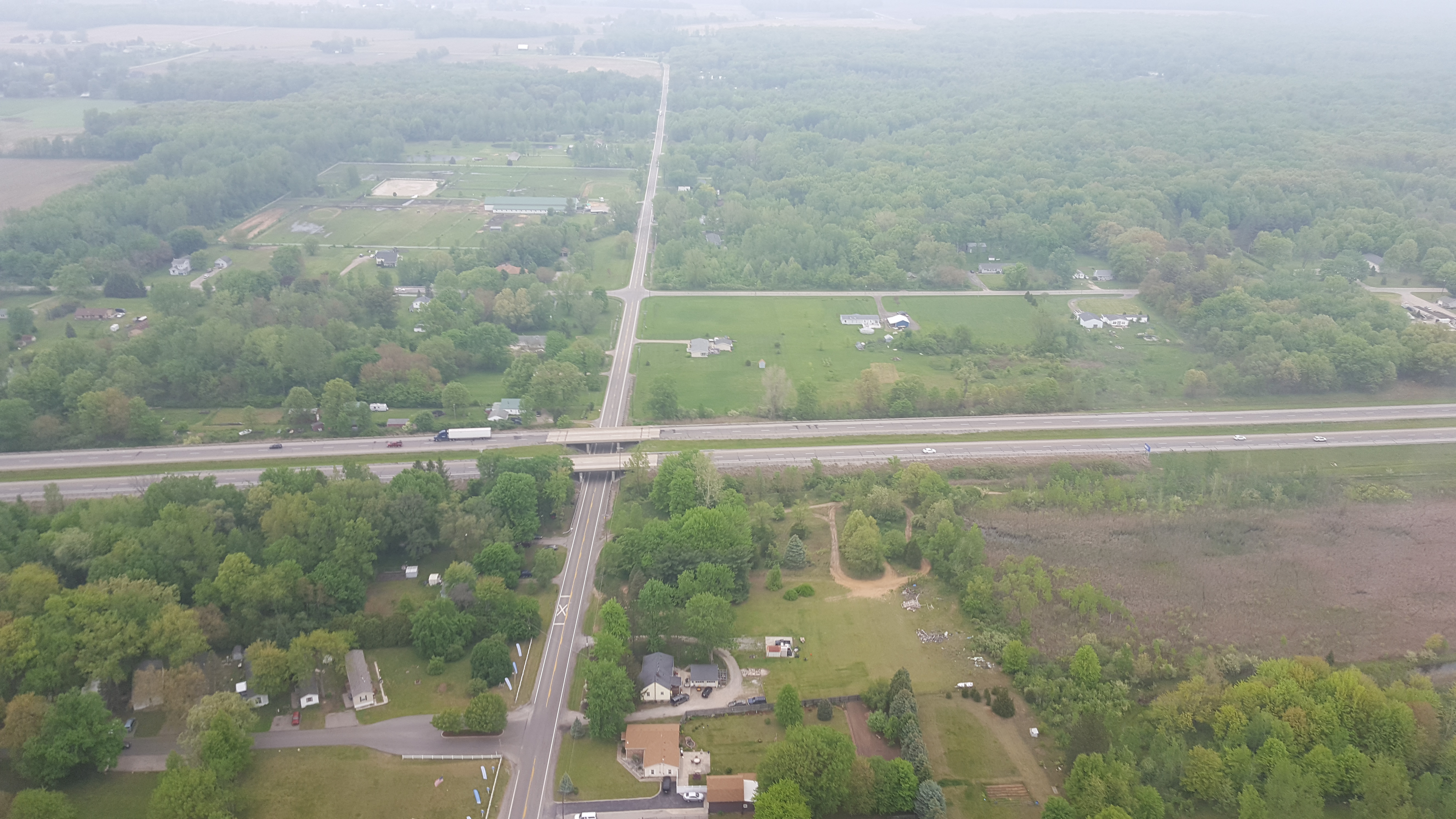
The Ohio Turnpike's bridge over State Route 295 near Swanton

SR 295 exists primarily within Lucas County with a southern terminus just inside the Wood County line. No portion of this state highway is included within the National Highway System.

== History ==
Designated in 1932, SR 295 was originally routed from its current eastern junction with SR 2 to its current northern terminus at the Michigan State Line in Berkey. One year later, the highway would be extended southward to SR 64 on the outskirts of Whitehouse. By 1935, SR 295 was extended southward one more time, this time to a southern terminus at US 24. The southern terminus of SR 295 was at a T-intersection with US 24 approximately 5 miles (8.0 km) southwest of Waterville until August 2012 when US 24 was rerouted. SR 295 was extended to run along the former US 24's alignment until Grand Rapids, where SR 295 then replaced the former SR 578 and terminates at SR-65.

== Major intersections ==
County	Location	mi	km	Destinations	Notes
Wood	Grand Rapids	0.00	0.00	SR 65 (Front Street) / Bridge Street	
Lucas	Providence Township	3.98	6.41	US 24 – Toledo, Napoleon	Exit 57 (US 24)
Lucas	Swanton–Waterville township line	8.98	14.45	SR 64 (Waterville-Swanton Road)	
Lucas	Swanton Township	12.24	19.70	US 20A east (Sager Road) – Maumee	Eastern end of US 20A concurrency
Lucas	Swanton Township	13.56	21.82	US 20A / SR 2 west (Airport Highway) – Swanton	Western end of US 20A concurrency; eastern end of SR 2 concurrency
Lucas	Swanton Township	14.35	23.09	SR 2 east (Airport Highway) – Toledo	Eastern end of SR 2 concurrency
Lucas	Richfield Township	20.65	33.23	US 20 / SR 120 (West Central Avenue) – Fayette, Maumee, Toledo	
Lucas	Berkey	24.00	38.62	Silberhorn Highway north	Michigan state line
1.000 mi = 1.609 km; 1.000 km = 0.621 mi: Concurrency terminus
