= Spencer-Sharples Local School District =

Former public school district in Holland, Ohio

Coordinates: 41°38′N 83°50′W

Spencer-Sharples High School

Location
- 323 S Irwin Rd. Holland, Ohio 43528

Information
- Type: Public School
- Opened: 1948 (as Irwin School)
- Closed: 1980
- School district: Spencer-Sharples Local School District (1948-1967), Toledo Public School District (1968-1980)
- Grades: 9-12
- Colors: Maroon & Gold
- Athletics conference: Independent
- Nickname: Falcons

Spencer-Sharples Local School District was a small, impoverished district about six miles (10 km) west of Toledo, Ohio. Through a unique act of the Ohio General Assembly, Spencer-Sharples was absorbed into the non-contiguous Toledo Public Schools on Jan. 1, 1968.

== History of Spencer-Sharples Local Schools ==
Spencer-Sharples came into existence in 1948 when the township schools of Spencer Township and Harding Township, Ohio merged. The western half of the new school district was predominantly white, while the eastern half of the district was predominantly black. In 1958, voters in the western half of Spencer-Sharples voted to join the adjacent Swanton Local School District, and voters in the eastern half voted to join the neighboring Springfield Local School District. Swanton's board of education accepted the western half; Springfield rejected the eastern half. After the western half joined Swanton, the 9.6-square-mile (25 km^{2}) remainder continued on as Spencer-Sharples Local School District. In 1967, the Ohio General Assembly voted to allow Toledo Public Schools to annex Spencer-Sharples, despite the fact that it was not geographically connected.

== Spencer-Sharples High School ==
Spencer-Sharples High School operated independently from 1958 to December 31, 1967, and then as part of the Toledo Public Schools system from January 1, 1968, until 1980, when the school was closed and the student body was sent to Bowsher and Rogers high schools in Toledo. Residents of the area were mostly resistant to having their identity wiped out and having to bus their children into Toledo. Their athletic teams were called the "Falcons" and they competed as an independent. The building still stands at the intersection of Irwin and Angola roads in western Lucas County.
