= Rogers High School (Toledo, Ohio) =

Robert S. Rogers High School
- Rogers High School
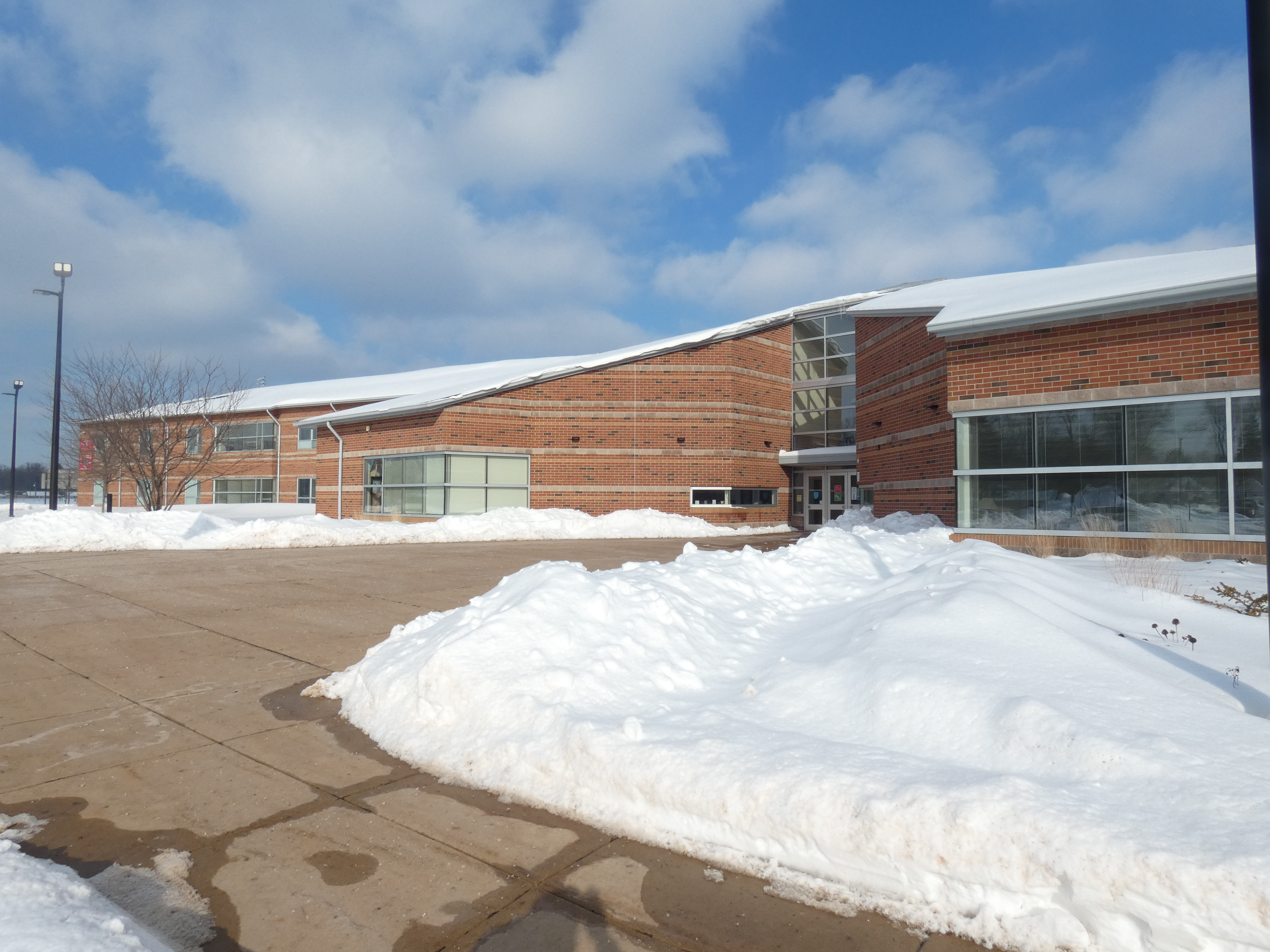
- Front entrance of the school

Location
- 222 McTigue Drive; Toledo, (Lucas County), Ohio 43615; United States
- Coordinates: 41°38′29″N 83°40′30″W

Information
- Type: Public, Coeducational high school
- Motto: Writing success stories... one student at a time.
- Opened: 1956
- School district: Toledo City School District
- Superintendent: Romules Durant
- Principal: Trudie Neely
- Grades: 9–12
- Enrollment: 721 (2023-2024)
- Colors: Red, White & Black
- Athletics conference: Toledo City League
- Team name: Rams
- Accreditation: North Central Association of Colleges and Schools
- Athletic Director: Harold Howell
- Website: https://rogershighschool.tps.org/

Robert S. Rogers High School is located in west Toledo, Ohio, United States. It has been part of Toledo Public Schools since 1964, when Adams Township was annexed by the city. The school motto is "Writing success stories... one student at a time."

== History of Rogers High School ==
In 1938, Toledo native Robert S. Rogers was elected to the Adams Township School Board. Frustrated by the fact that the township's teens were forced to attend high school in neighboring districts, Rogers advocated construction of a township high school – not just for the sake of convenience, but to create community in the township.

Rogers died in 1944, but his dream came to fruition in 1956 when 500 students walked into the school named after him at the corner of Nebraska Ave. and McTigue Drive. At the time, it was everything educators, students, and families could want for their suburban, nearly rural, community. Rogers High indeed provided a common identity for the Adams Township community – to the point where Joseph's Supermarket donated a rambunctious live ram ("Bunky") as the school's mascot!

What Rogers couldn’t have dreamed was the growth of the neighborhoods flanking Reynolds Road as Toledo's economy boomed after World War II. By 1964, Adams Township entered into an annexation agreement with the City of Toledo, and in 1966 Rogers High School was reborn as a Toledo Public School – complete with a million dollar expansion that included the city's only high school planetarium, a spacious library, cafeteria, and a gargantuan West Gymnasium that was the envy of the City League.

As the children of the post-war Baby Boom grew, so did Rogers High School. By the 1970s, Rogers had adopted a split schedule to accommodate some 2,400 students. In 1976, the building was expanded a third time with the state-of-the-art Rogers Skills Center added onto the front of the building. In 1980, the school absorbed the majority of the students of the former Spencer-Sharples High School several miles to the west after numerous attempts to merge the Spencer-Sharples Local School District with neighboring, predominantly white, districts failed. This was a pattern that in 1975, the U.S. Department of Health, Education, and Welfare would say violated U.S. civil rights laws and created a segregated district. Rogers also absorbed a fair amount of DeVilbiss and Macomber students in 1991 when TPS closed both of those buildings.

Demolition of the old Rogers High School began in October 2007 and finished in February 2008.

The new Rogers High School (built as part of Toledo Public Schools' "Building for Success" program) opened in 2006-2007 on McTigue Drive (while the new McTigue Middle School near Rogers opened on Nebraska Drive in September 2007).

== Rogers Athletics ==
Boys athletic teams are known as the Rams, with girls teams competing as the Lady Rams. The school's teams compete in the Toledo City League.

- Girls Fast-pitch softball
- Boys Baseball
- Boys & Girls Basketball: 2011-12 Boys 1959-60 Varsity team won Rams 1st GLL championship
- Boys & Girls Cross Country
- Girls Tennis
- Boys & Girls Track (City League Boys Champions 1993, 1994, 1996, 2000, 2001, 2002, 2003)
- Girls Volleyball
- Football (City League Champions 2000; State Playoffs 2000, 2005)

== Ohio High School Athletic Association State Championships ==
- Girls Track and Field - 1977
- Girls Basketball - 2018, 2019

== Great Lakes League (GLL) & Toledo City League Titles ==
- Football: 1964 (GLL), 1966 (GLL), 2000, 2011
- Volleyball:
- Golf:
- Boys Basketball:1966-67 (GLL), 2011–12
- Girls Basketball: 2012, 2013, 2014, 2015, 2016, 2017, 2018, 2019, 2020
- Wrestling: 1971-72, 1974–75, 1983–84, 1984–85, 1985–86, 1986–87, 1987–88
- Baseball:
- Boys Track and Field: 1993, 1994, 1996, 2000, 2001, 2002, 2003, 2013
- Girls Track and Field: 1971, 1977, 1978, 1979, 1996, 1997, 1998, 1999, 2013
- Softball: 2013

(years marked with an asterisk (*) denote a shared title)

== School organizations and clubs ==
- Afro Club
- Architecture, Construction, Engineering (ACE)
- Band
- "Be The Change" Team
- Business Professionals of America
- Cheerleading
- Community Service
- Choir
- Chess Club
- Community Service
- Construction Careers Academy
- Dance Team
- Drama
- FCA (Fellowship of Christian Athletes)
- FCCLA (FHA)
- Flag Corp
- French Club
- Future Teachers of America
- Jazz Band
- Jefferson Madison
- Newspaper
- Orchestra
- Paragon (NHS)
- Photography
- Robotics
- SAAB (Student African-American Brotherhood)
- Spanish club
- Spirit Club
- Student Council
- Thespians
- Yearbook
- Young Women of Excellence (Daughters of Promise)

Additionally, the school's Latin Club functions as a local chapter of both the Ohio Junior Classical League (OJCL) and National Junior Classical League (NJCL).

== School songs ==
Alma Mater
We pledge our hearts our hands our voice to you Rogers High
We always strive to do our best for you Rogers High
Through life's long journey, we will recall,
The worthy lessons we learned in your halls
Rogers, Rogers High,
We Pledge our best to you.

Fight Song
Drive, drive on down the field
Push ever forward
Our Rogers High School
Never will meet defeat-Go Team
Drive through that line on to victory
We're here to cheer you
Never falter, never failing
Rogers High.

== Notable alumni ==
- Yvonne Brown - Mayor of Tchula, Mississippi, first female black Republican Mayor in state of Mississippi
- Zia Cooke - South Carolina Gamecocks Woman’s Basketball star and drafted 10th overall in the 2023 WNBA Draft.
- Fred Davis - tight end for USC, 2007 Mackey Award winner, and in National Football League for Washington Redskins
- Erik Kynard - high jumper, gold medalist at 2012 Summer Olympics
- Steve Mix - professional basketball player for Philadelphia 76ers, Detroit Pistons, NBA All-Star
- Joe Tiller - head football coach for Purdue and Wyoming
- Bonnie Turner - member of Emmy Award-winning television and film writing/producing team Terry and Bonnie Turner; credits include Saturday Night Live, 3rd Rock from the Sun, That '70s Show and Wayne's World (movie)

== RHS Hall of Fame ==
Rogers High School's Athletic Hall of Fame was instituted in 2003 to honor the school's notable athletes and coaches through its 50 year history.

In November 2006 the Athletic Director of Rogers High School chose to disband the existing board and its members. Though the non-profit organization still exists, they no longer nominate and vote for newly inducted members. The old board does not recognize inductees past 2006 and for that reason the website shows no new members.
