= Springfield Township, Lucas County, Ohio =

Township in Ohio, US

- Township
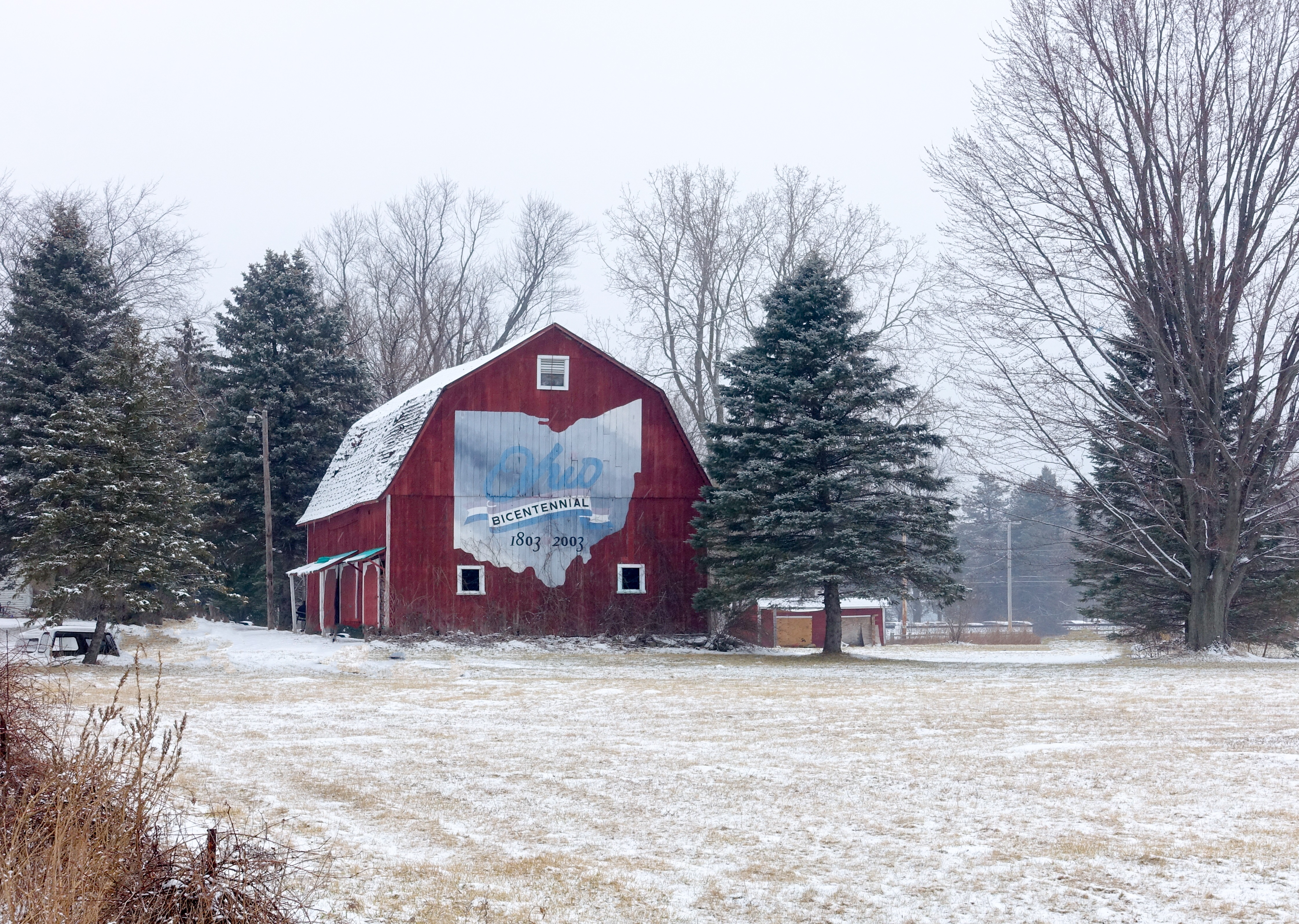
- Bicentennial barn west of Holland on State Route 2

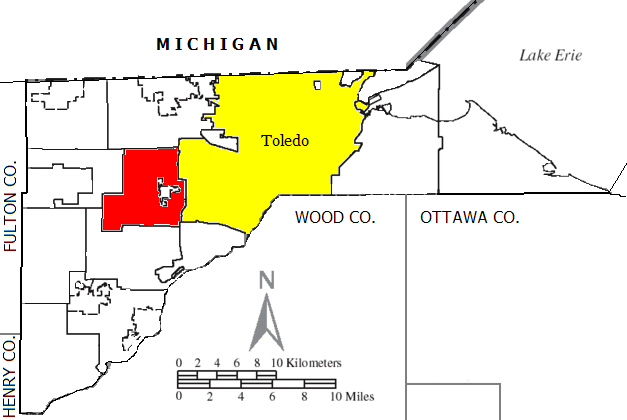
- Location of Springfield Township within Lucas County
- Coordinates: 41°37′13″N 83°43′4″W
- Country: United States
- State: Ohio
- County: Lucas

Area
  - Total: 21.6 sq mi (55.9 km^{2})
  - Land: 21.5 sq mi (55.7 km^{2})
  - Water: 0.039 sq mi (0.1 km^{2})
- Elevation: 633 ft (193 m)

Population (2020)
  - Total: 26,957
  - Density: 1,250/sq mi (484/km^{2})
- Time zone: UTC-5 (Eastern (EST))
  - Summer (DST): UTC-4 (EDT)
- FIPS code: 39-74123
- GNIS feature ID: 1086534
- Website: www.springfieldtownship.net

Springfield Township is one of the eleven townships of Lucas County, Ohio, United States. As of the 2020 census, the total population was 26,957, making it the third most populous part of Lucas County, behind Toledo and Sylvania Township.

== Geography ==
Located in the central part of the county, it borders the following townships and cities:

- Sylvania Township - north
- Toledo - east
- Maumee - southeast
- Monclova Township - south
- Spencer Township - west

The village of Holland lies in eastern Springfield Township.

== Name and history ==
Springfield Township was organized in 1836. It is one of eleven Springfield Townships statewide.

== Schools ==
Springfield Local School District has four elementary schools, one middle school, and one high school. The schools are Holloway, Crissey, Dorr Elementary, and Holland Elementary Schools, Springfield Middle School, and Springfield High School. The mascot of Springfield High School is the "Blue Devil". The district was rated "Excellent" by the Ohio Department of Education between 2008 and 2011.

== Government ==
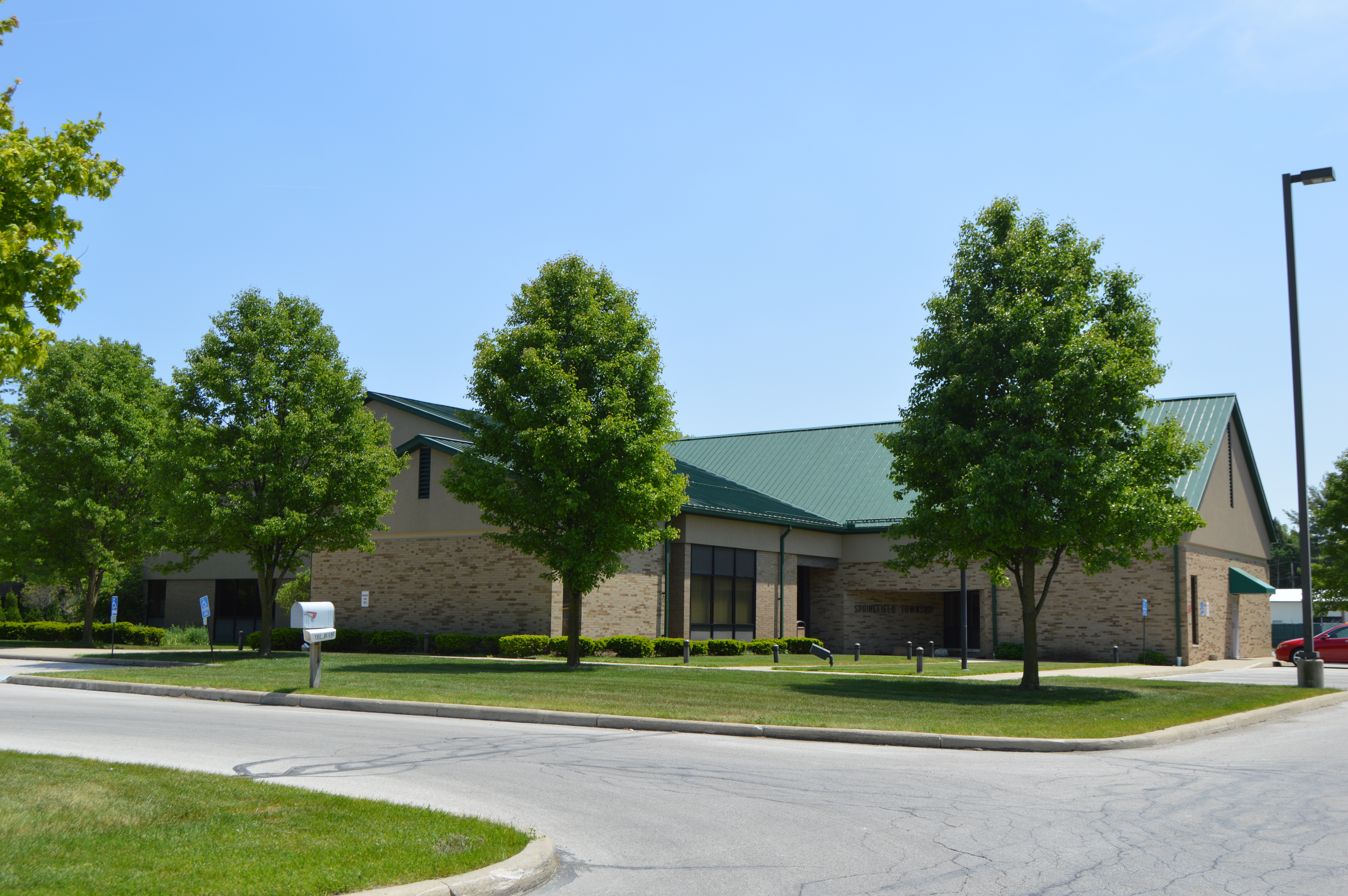
Township hall

The township is governed by a three-member board of trustees, who are elected in November of odd-numbered years to a four-year term beginning on the following January 1. Two are elected in the year after the presidential election and one is elected in the year before it. There is also an elected township fiscal officer, who serves a four-year term beginning on April 1 of the year after the election, which is held in November of the year before the presidential election. Vacancies in the fiscal officership or on the board of trustees are filled by the remaining trustees.

== Notable people ==
- Joe the Plumber (Samuel Joseph Wurzelbacher), a person brought to attention during the 2008 U.S presidential election campaign
- Rick Upchurch, wide receiver for the Denver Broncos 1975-1983

== Transportation ==
The following highways are important transportation arteries in Springfield Township:

- Interstate 475/U.S. Route 23 from Sylvania Township to Monclova Township
- State Route 2 "Airport Highway" (Swanton Township to Toledo)
