= Jerusalem Township, Lucas County, Ohio =

Township in Ohio, US

- Township
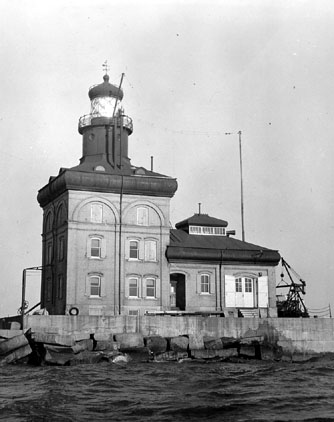
- The Toledo Harbor Light in Lake Erie

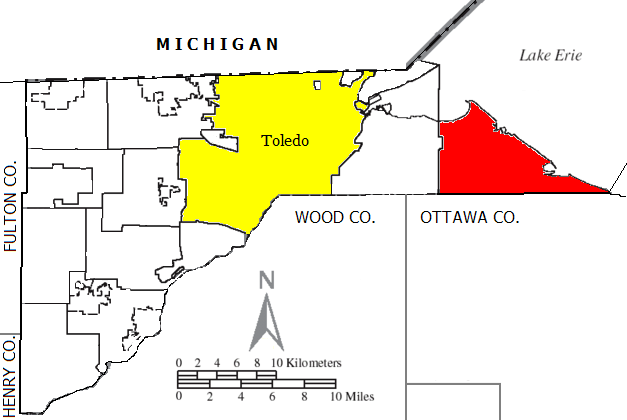
- Jerusalem Township in Lucas County
- Coordinates: 41°39′0″N 83°16′50″W
- Country: United States
- State: Ohio
- County: Lucas

Area
  - Total: 265.8 sq mi (688.4 km^{2})
  - Land: 30.4 sq mi (78.7 km^{2})
  - Water: 235.4 sq mi (609.7 km^{2})
- Elevation: 574 ft (175 m)

Population (2020)
  - Total: 2,895
  - Density: 95.3/sq mi (36.8/km^{2})
- Time zone: UTC-5 (Eastern (EST))
  - Summer (DST): UTC-4 (EDT)
- FIPS code: 39-39116
- GNIS feature ID: 1086526
- Website: www.twp.jerusalem.oh.us

Jerusalem Township is one of the eleven townships of Lucas County, Ohio, United States. The 2020 census found 2,895 people in the township.

== Geography ==
Located in the far eastern part of the county along the shores of Lake Erie, it borders the following townships and city:

- Put-in-Bay Township, Ottawa County - east, across Lake Erie
- Carroll Township, Ottawa County - southeast
- Benton Township, Ottawa County - south
- Allen Township, Ottawa County - southwest
- Oregon - west

No municipalities are located in Jerusalem Township, although the unincorporated communities of Bono, Curtice (a census-designated place), and Yondota lie in the township's southwest, southwest, and south. The census-designated place of Reno Beach, comprising the communities of Lakemont Landing, Reno Beach, Lakeland, and Howard Farms Beach, occupies the Lake Erie shoreline in the eastern part of the township. West Sister Island, in Lake Erie about 9 miles offshore to the northeast, is also included in the township.

The fake town of Goblu was inserted into the 1978-79 Michigan state map in the township as a joke.

Jerusalem Township is also the home of Crane Creek State Park, the Cedar Point National Wildlife Refuge, and the Ottawa National Wildlife Refuge.

== Name and history ==
It is the only Jerusalem Township statewide.

== Government ==
The township is governed by a three-member board of trustees, who are elected in November of odd-numbered years to a four-year term beginning on the following January 1. Two are elected in the year after the presidential election and one is elected in the year before it. There is also an elected township fiscal officer, who serves a four-year term beginning on April 1 of the year after the election, which is held in November of the year before the presidential election. Vacancies in the fiscal officership or on the board of trustees are filled by the remaining trustees.

== Education ==
Children living in Jerusalem Township are sent to the Oregon City School District, in Oregon, Ohio. K-4 to Jerusalem Elementary, 5–6 to Eisenhower Intermediate, 7–8 to Fassett Junior High and 9–12 to Clay High School.

== See also ==
- Turtle Island (Lake Erie)
