= Providence, Ohio =

- Ghost town
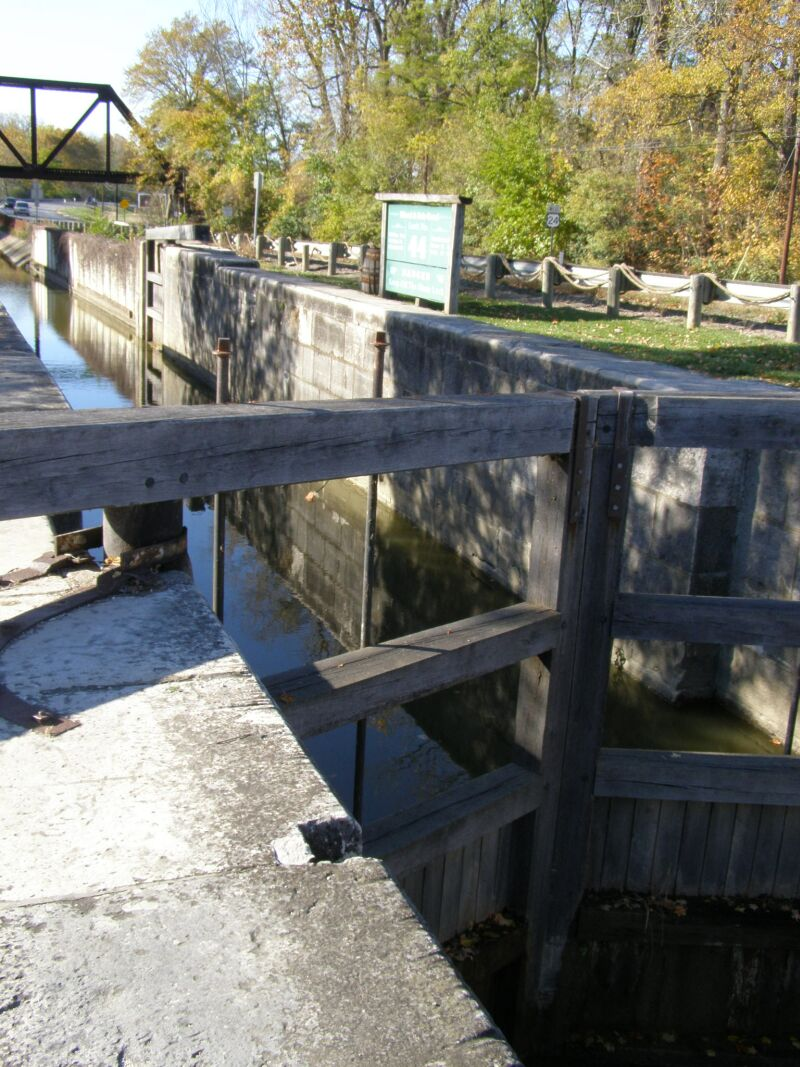
- Lock #44 in Providence Metropark

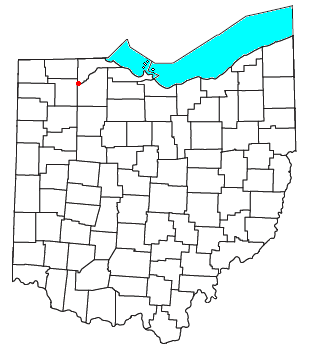
- Location of Providence, Ohio
- Coordinates: 41°25′05″N 83°52′20″W
- Country: United States
- State: Ohio
- County: Lucas
- Township: Providence
- Time zone: UTC-5 (Eastern (EST))
  - Summer (DST): UTC-4 (EDT)

Providence is a ghost town on the north side of the Maumee River in southern Providence Township, Lucas County, Ohio, United States, about 24 miles (39 km) southwest of Toledo. After suffering a destructive fire and a cholera epidemic in mid-19th century, the village was abandoned. In this period, canal traffic had also fallen off.

The area is now maintained as Providence Metropark of Toledo, featuring numerous elements of the canal era, including a mule-drawn canal boat on a restored section of the Miami and Erie Canal, and an operating saw and gristmill.

== History ==
The village of Providence was founded by a French Canadian, Peter Manor, who was the first white man to settle upriver on the Maumee River away from Lake Erie. He arrived there in 1816 in order to establish a fur trading post for the North West Fur Company, then based in Montreal, Quebec, Canada. But the United States prohibited Canadian traders from operating below the border and he was closed down.

In 1822, Manor had a sawmill erected next to the river, and a gristmill was built in 1835. This was about 24 miles from the river's mouth on Maumee Bay, where there was still an Odawa people village, part of a 34-square mile reserve on the south side of the river.

As the number of settlers increased in Ohio, promoters of the state discussed a proposal for a Miami and Erie Canal to improve transportation to the southwest parts of the state and connect them to markets on and served by Lake Erie. Manor platted the town to prepare for anticipated development. In 1837, the State of Ohio granted Manor a contract to begin construction, and the town was soon open for business. By 1843, some of the eighty-eight lots laid out were vacated. The village was, in general, considered a favorable place to live by the westward settlers. It was often seen as a haven from the problems of lawlessness, drinking, fighting, and crime that began to plague Ohio canal towns.

A catastrophic fire swept through the village in 1846, destroying most of the many wooden buildings in the central business district. The destroyed buildings were not rebuilt and the town never recovered. In 1854 river travelers brought a cholera epidemic, also spread by contaminated water. Those who survived rapidly left Providence, so fast that most of their possessions were left behind.

The remaining structures were eventually destroyed or moved, and the land plats disappeared. On October 28, 1928, Lucas County officially removed Providence from its records. The remaining buildings, the church and the saw and gristmill, have been designated as an historic district by the Department of the Interior.

== Miami and Erie Canal ==
The Miami and Erie Canal was vital to the growth and development of Providence. The canal not only brought goods to the village; it brought passengers, both immigrants and frontiersmen. At a time of few improved roads, water travel had a great advantage over traditional horse and carriage. Because of the large influx of travelers, Providence grew daily.

Once the canal began operating, the local economy boomed. Commodity amounts of produce, pelts, grain, and other goods constantly flowed through the village. When the railroads were completed in the 1870s, canal traffic greatly diminished. The canal was abandoned by the 1900s. The slow pace and low capacity of canal boats was no match for what could be offered by the railroads.

The site of the village is now preserved in part as Providence Metropark, one of the Toledo Metroparks system. It includes the fully operational Isaac Ludwig mill. Near the gristmill is Lock No. 44 of the canal system; it has been restored. In addition, during the temperate season, the park runs a mule-drawn replica canal boat, The Volunteer, which carries visitors along the small section of restored canal and goes through Lock No. 44.

== Remaining structures ==
Many buildings and structures remain standing in the Providence area. Some have been restored. They include the following:

- Isaac Ludwig saw and gristmill, restored in the Historic Providence District
- Providence Metropark features a lookout for the Providence dam
- Providence Township Schools; four buildings are still standing:
  - The Perry School (Neowash and Manore road)
  - Long School (Heller and Neowash Road)
  - Strayer School (Neowash and State Route 295)
  - Box School (Box and Jeffers Road)
- St. Patrick Roman Catholic Church, still in use, built in 1845 (the church hall and kitchen were added in 1954)
- The Neapolis School and Ford School were both moved to Waterville-Neapolis Road and Manore Road, and united as one building in 1915. In 1967, the united building was converted to an auction house.
