= Ohio State Route 578 =

State highway in northwestern Ohio, US

State Route 578
- Former SR 578 highlighted in red

Route information
- Maintained by ODOT
- Length: 0.19 mi (310 m)
- Existed: 1937–2012

Major junctions
- South end: SR 65 in Grand Rapids
- North end: US 24 near Grand Rapids

Location
- Country: United States
- State: Ohio
- Counties: Wood, Lucas

Highway system
- Ohio State Highway System; Interstate; US; State; Scenic
← SR 577	→ SR 579

State Route 578 (SR 578) was a short north–south state highway in northwestern Ohio, a U.S. state. SR 578 ranked among the shortest state routes in the state, coming in at a length of just 0.19 miles (0.31 km). Its southern terminus was at SR 65 in Grand Rapids, and its northern terminus was at what was then U.S. Route 24 (US 24), just across the Maumee River and the Wood-Lucas county line from Grand Rapids. After SR 295 was extended from its southern terminus along the Maumee River and the former route of US 24, it took over all of SR 578 in 2012 thereby deleting the SR 578 designation.

== Route description ==
Although a route of less than one-quarter mile (0.40 km) in length, SR 578 did pass through two counties: Wood and Lucas. The highway was not included within the National Highway System.

No sooner than starting from the intersection of SR 65 and Bridge Street in Grand Rapids, SR 578 crossed the Maumee River via a two-lane, four-span steel bridge. North of the bridge, SR 578 met a pair of driveways (one on either side of the roadway), crossed over a very narrow waterway parallel to the Maumee River, and promptly arrived at its endpoint at the former US 24.

== History ==
SR 578 was designated in 1937 as a route that was much longer than the short connector that is serves as today. Starting from the Henry County intersection of what is now SR 108 (then known as SR 33) and County Road L approximately four miles (6.4 km) south of Napoleon, SR 578 followed what is now County Road L east, passing an intersection with SR 109 and straddling the northern village limits of Malinta. Continuing east, SR 578 continued eastward along County Road L, crossing SR 65 and proceeded to Township Road 1C, which the state route then followed northeasterly to the County Road M intersection, and turned east. Heading into Wood County, the route followed Sand Ridge Road to Wapakoneta Road (County Road 189), then turned north, and followed Wapakoneta Road past an intersection with US 6 and into Grand Rapids. There, SR 578 ended at what is now just SR 65, but was then a concurrency between SR 65 and US 24. US 24 then crossed over the Maumee River where SR 578 existed for most of its history.

In 1942, US 24 was re-routed onto the north side of the Maumee River heading northeast from Napoleon. SR 578 was then extended into Lucas County to meet US 24 on the north side of the Maumee River across from Grand Rapids, via the bridge that formerly carried US 24 across the river there. One year later, however, SR 578 was shortened greatly, when jurisdiction of the route between SR 108 south of Napoleon and SR 65 in Grand Rapids was yielded to Henry and Wood Counties. Since then, SR 578 had simply been the short route across the Maumee River connecting SR 65 with US 24. In August 2012 when US 24 was rerouted, SR 295 was extended to run along part of the former US 24's alignment until Grand Rapids, where SR 295 then replaced SR 578.

== Major intersections ==
County	Location	mi	km	Destinations	Notes
Wood	Grand Rapids	0.00	0.00	SR 65 (Front Street) / Bridge Street	
Lucas	Providence Township	0.19	0.31	US 24 (Anthony Wayne Road) / Grand Rapids Road	
1.000 mi = 1.609 km; 1.000 km = 0.621 mi
