= Reno Beach, Ohio =

- Census-designated place
- Location within Ohio Location within the United States
- Coordinates: 41°39′40″N 83°15′51″W
- Country: United States
- State: Ohio
- County: Lucas
- Township: Jerusalem

Area
  - Total: 1.63 sq mi (4.22 km^{2})
  - Land: 1.24 sq mi (3.21 km^{2})
  - Water: 0.39 sq mi (1.01 km^{2})
- Elevation: 571 ft (174 m)

Population (2020)
  - Total: 713
  - Density: 575.7/sq mi (222.26/km^{2})
- Time zone: UTC-5 (Eastern (EST))
  - Summer (DST): UTC-4 (EDT)
- ZIP Code: 43412 (Curtice)
- Area codes: 419/567
- FIPS code: 39-66264
- GNIS feature ID: 2812827

Reno Beach is a census-designated place (CDP) in Lucas County, Ohio, United States, on the southwest shore of Lake Erie. It contains the unincorporated communities of Lakemont Landing, Reno Beach, Lakeland, and Howard Farms Beach (from west to east) and was first listed as a CDP prior to the 2020 census. As of the 2020 census, Reno Beach had a population of 713.

The CDP is in eastern Lucas County, in Jerusalem Township. It is 2 miles (3 km) north of Ohio State Route 2 and 14 miles (23 km) east of Toledo .

== Demographics ==
Historical population
Census	Pop.	Note	%±
2020	713		—
U.S. Decennial Census
