= Sylvania Township, Lucas County, Ohio =

Township in Ohio, US

- Township
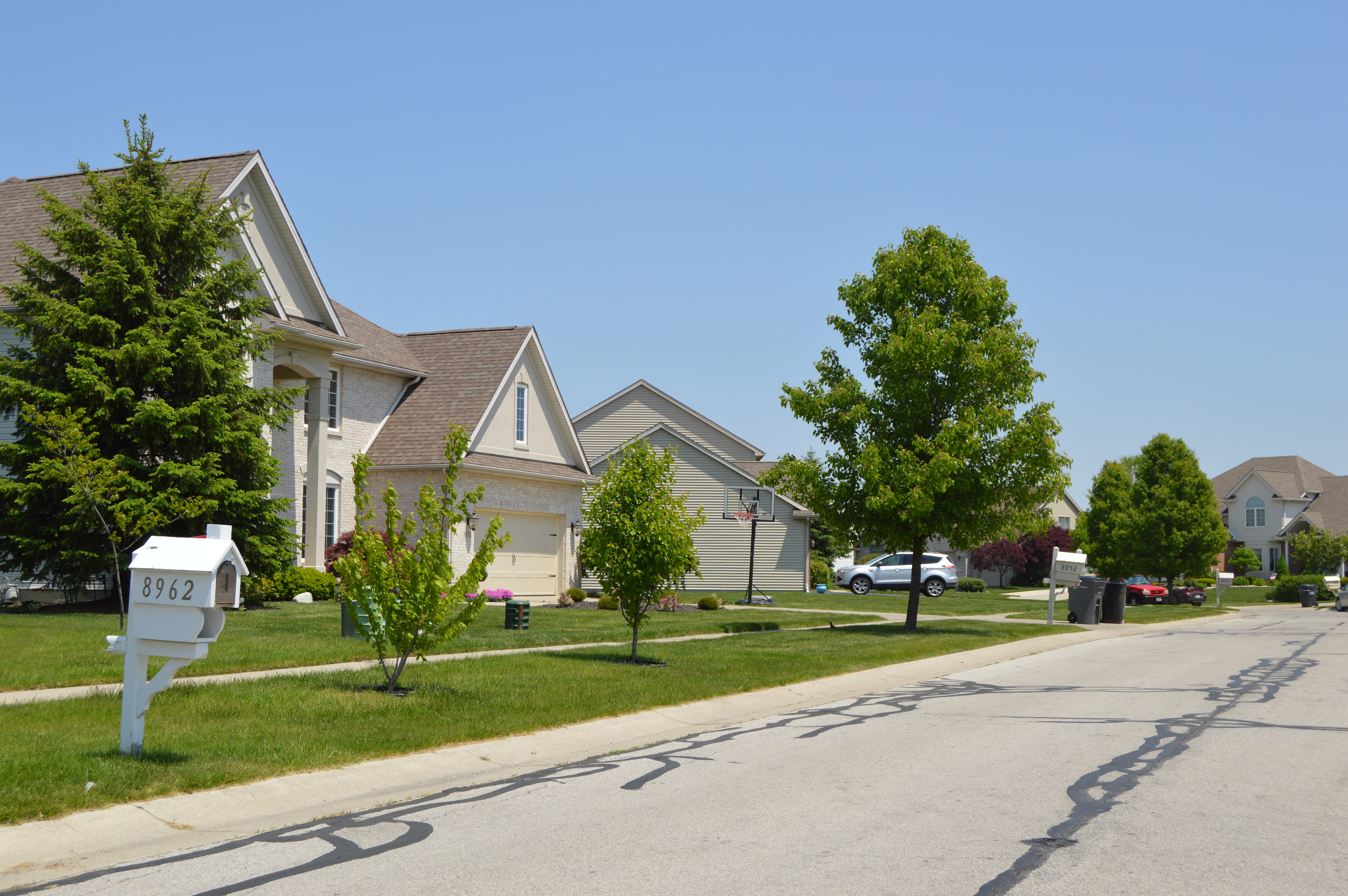
- Housing development west of the city of Sylvania

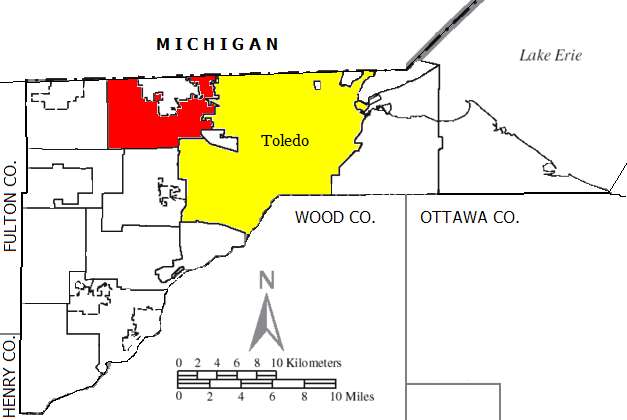
- Location of Sylvania Township within Lucas County, Ohio.
- Coordinates: 41°41′54″N 83°41′55″W
- Country: United States
- State: Ohio
- County: Lucas

Area
  - Total: 28.5 sq mi (73.7 km^{2})
  - Land: 28.4 sq mi (73.5 km^{2})
  - Water: 0.077 sq mi (0.2 km^{2})
- Elevation: 669 ft (204 m)

Population (2020)
  - Total: 50,679
  - Density: 1,786/sq mi (689.5/km^{2})
- Time zone: UTC-5 (Eastern (EST))
  - Summer (DST): UTC-4 (EDT)
- ZIP code: 43560,43615, 43617, 43623
- Area codes: 419, 567
- FIPS code: 39-76025
- GNIS feature ID: 1086536
- Website: www.sylvaniatownship.com

Sylvania Township is one of the eleven townships of Lucas County, Ohio, United States. As of 2020, the total population was 50,679, making it the second most populous municipality of Lucas County, Northwest Ohio, and the 419 / 567 area codes (behind only Toledo).

The township entirely encompasses the city of Sylvania. Excluding the city of Sylvania, the remainder of the township had a population of 31,668 in 2020. The township government is under direction of a 3-member Board of Trustees (elected to staggered 4-year terms), an elected Clerk and a full-time Administrator.

== Geography ==
Located in the northern part of the county, it borders the following townships and municipalities:

- Whiteford Township, Monroe County, Michigan - north
- Toledo - east
- Ottawa Hills - southeast
- Springfield Township - south
- Spencer Township - southwest
- Richfield Township - west
- Riga Township, Lenawee County, Michigan - northwest

The city of Sylvania lies in northern Sylvania Township.

The Ottawa River and Ten Mile Creek both flow through the township.

== Name and history ==
The township was named for its former woodlands, Sylvania being a name derived from Latin meaning "forest land". It is the only Sylvania Township statewide.

== Demographics ==
=== 2020 census ===
Sylvania Township racial composition
Race	Number	Percentage
White (NH)	41,231	81.4%
Black or African American (NH)	2,129	4.20%
Native American (NH)	73	0.14%
Asian (NH)	1,899	3.75%
Pacific Islander (NH)	10	0.02%
Other/mixed	3,294	6.50%
Hispanic or Latino	2,043	4.03%

== Government ==
Sylvania township is a limited home rule township governed by a three-member board of trustees, who are elected in November of odd-numbered years to a four-year term beginning on the following January 1. ORC Chapter 504. Two are elected in the year after the presidential election and one is elected in the year before it. There is also an elected township fiscal officer, who serves a four-year term beginning on April 1 of the year after the election, which is held in November of the year before the presidential election. Vacancies in the fiscal officership or on the board of trustees are filled by the remaining trustees.

As of August 2024, the Township Trustees are Neal Mahoney, Jill Johnson and John Jennewine. Dave Simko is the fiscal officer.

== Transportation ==
The following highways are important transportation arteries in Sylvania Township:

- Interstate 475 from Toledo, Ohio to Springfield Township
- U.S. Route 20 Central Avenue (Richfield Township to Reynolds Road), Reynolds Road (Central Avenue to Toledo)
- U.S. Route 23, Whiteford Township, Monroe County, Michigan to Interstate 475, then concurrent with Interstate 475 to Springfield Township
- SR 51 Monroe Street (Toledo to US 23), ends at US 23
- SR 120 Central Avenue (Richfield Township to Ottawa Hills and Toledo)
- SR 184 Alexis Road (Toledo) to Acres Road

- (eastbound) - Acres Road (Alexis Road to Monroe Street), ends at Monroe Street
- (westbound) - Alexis Road (Acres Road to Monroe Street), ends at Monroe Street
