= Monclova Township, Lucas County, Ohio =

Township in Ohio, US

Monclova Township, Ohio
- Township
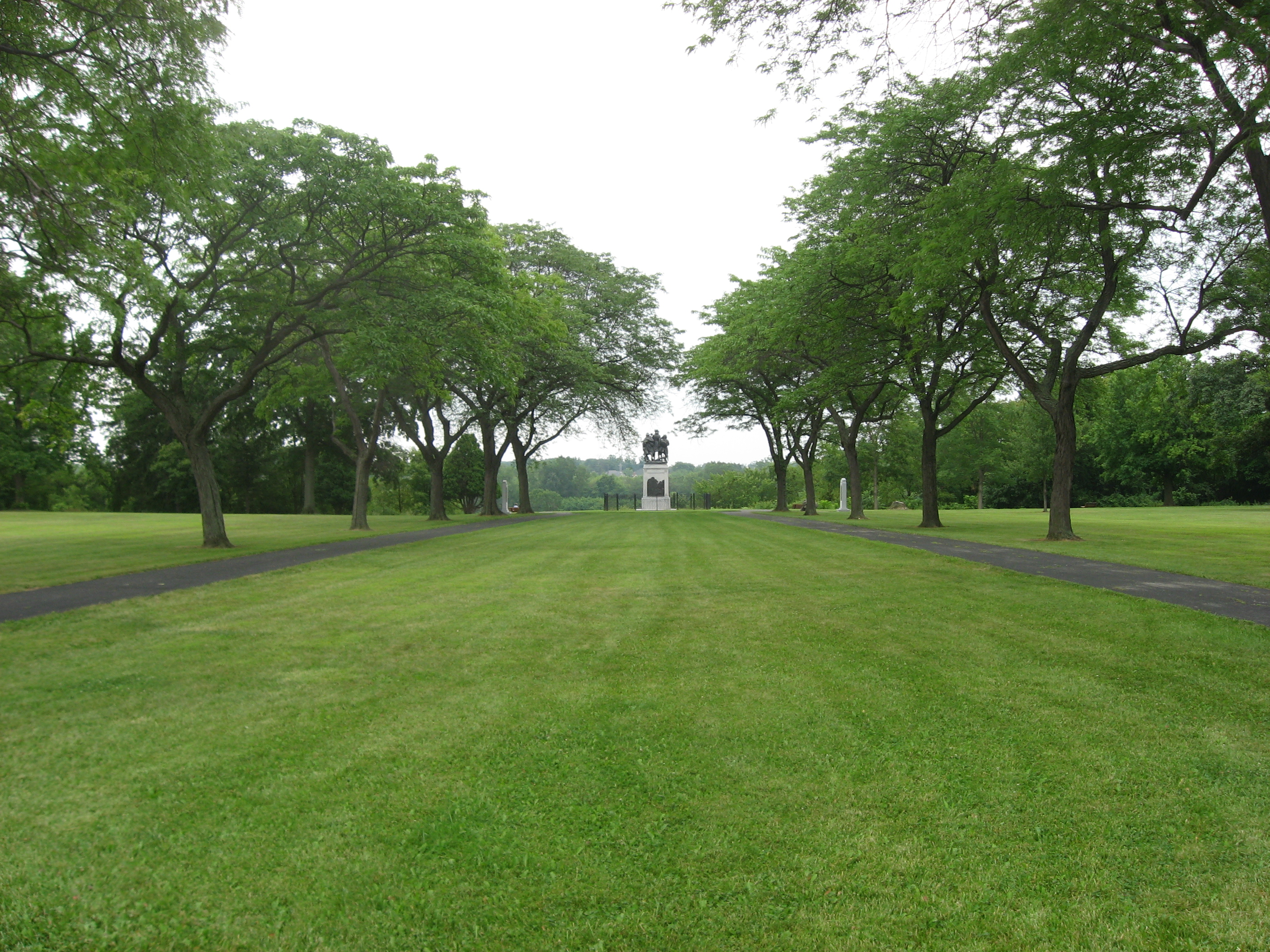
- Memorial at the Fallen Timbers Battlefield

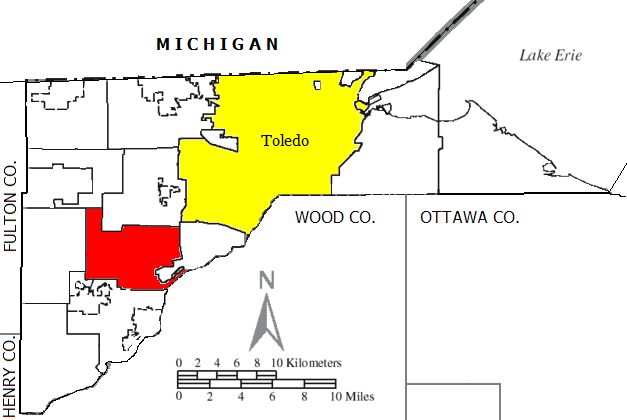
- Location of Monclova Township in Lucas County, Ohio
- Coordinates: 41°33′31″N 83°44′24″W
- Country: United States
- State: Ohio
- County: Lucas

Area
  - Total: 22.1 sq mi (57.3 km^{2})
  - Land: 22.0 sq mi (56.9 km^{2})
  - Water: 0.15 sq mi (0.4 km^{2})
- Elevation: 614 ft (187 m)

Population (2020)
  - Total: 14,827
  - Density: 675/sq mi (261/km^{2})
- Time zone: UTC-5 (Eastern (EST))
  - Summer (DST): UTC-4 (EDT)
- ZIP code: 43542
- Area code: 419
- FIPS code: 39-51156
- GNIS feature ID: 1086528
- Website: monclovatwp.org

Monclova Township is one of the eleven townships of Lucas County, Ohio, United States. The 2020 census found 14,827 people in the township.

== Geography ==
Located in the central part of the county, it borders the following townships and city:

- Springfield Township - north
- Maumee - east
- Perrysburg Township, Wood County - southeast
- Waterville Township - south
- Swanton Township - west
- Spencer Township - northwest
- Whitehouse - southwest

No municipalities are located in Monclova Township, although the unincorporated community of Monclova lies in the township's center.

== Name and history ==
Monclova Township was organized in 1853. It is the only Monclova Township statewide. According to Monclova Township's Land Use Plan 2009, the name "Monclova" means "one clan."

== Government ==
The township is governed by a three-member board of trustees, who are elected in November of odd-numbered years to a four-year term beginning on the following January 1. Two are elected in the year after the presidential election and one is elected in the year before it. There is also an elected township fiscal officer, who serves a four-year term beginning on April 1 of the year after the election, which is held in November of the year before the presidential election. Vacancies in the fiscal officership or on the board of trustees are filled by the remaining trustees.
