= Fulton Township, Fulton County, Ohio =

Township in Ohio, US

- Township
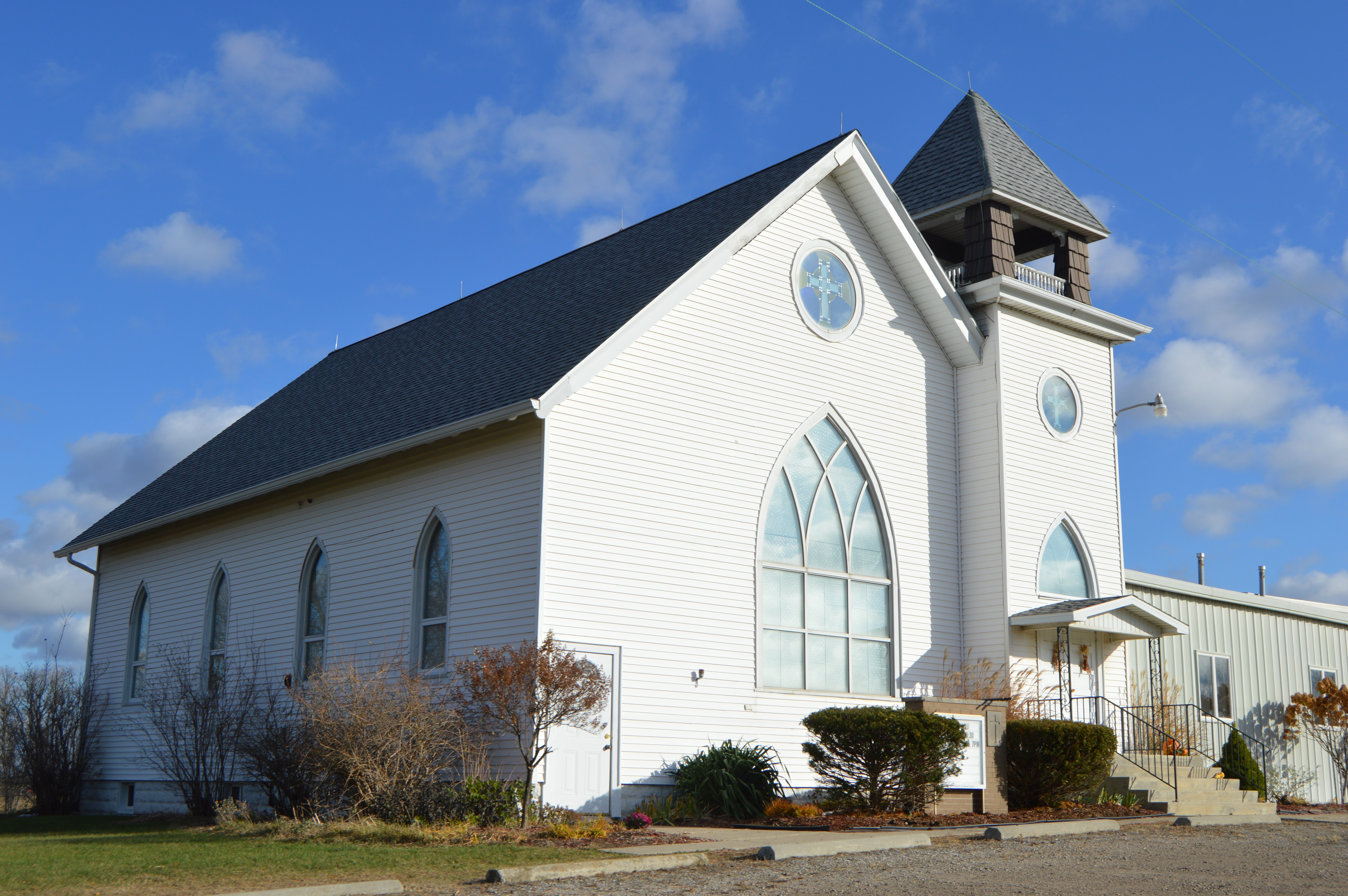
- Fulton Union Christian Church

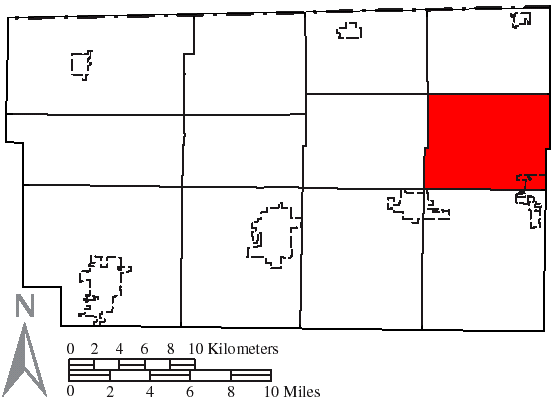
- Location of Fulton Township in Fulton County
- Coordinates: 41°36′37″N 83°55′51″W
- Country: United States
- State: Ohio
- County: Fulton

Area
  - Total: 28.8 sq mi (74.5 km^{2})
  - Land: 28.7 sq mi (74.3 km^{2})
  - Water: 0.077 sq mi (0.2 km^{2})
- Elevation: 699 ft (213 m)

Population (2020)
  - Total: 3,147
  - Density: 110/sq mi (42.4/km^{2})
- Time zone: UTC-5 (Eastern (EST))
  - Summer (DST): UTC-4 (EDT)
- FIPS code: 39-29036
- GNIS feature ID: 1086125

Fulton Township is one of the twelve townships of Fulton County, Ohio, United States. As of the 2020 census the population was 3,147.

== Geography ==
Located in the eastern part of the county, it borders the following townships:

- Amboy Township - north
- Richfield Township, Lucas County - northeast corner
- Spencer Township, Lucas County - east, north of Harding Township
- Harding Township, Lucas County - east, south of Spencer Township
- Swanton Township, Lucas County - southeast
- Swan Creek Township - south
- York Township - southwest corner
- Pike Township - west
- Royalton Township - northwest corner

Part of the village of Swanton is located in southeastern Fulton Township.

== Name and history ==
It is the only Fulton Township statewide.

== Government ==
The township is governed by a three-member board of trustees, who are elected in November of odd-numbered years to a four-year term beginning on the following January 1. Two are elected in the year after the presidential election and one is elected in the year before it. There is also an elected township fiscal officer, who serves a four-year term beginning on April 1 of the year after the election, which is held in November of the year before the presidential election. Vacancies in the fiscal officership or on the board of trustees are filled by the remaining trustees.
