= Harding Township, Lucas County, Ohio =

Township in Ohio, US

- Township
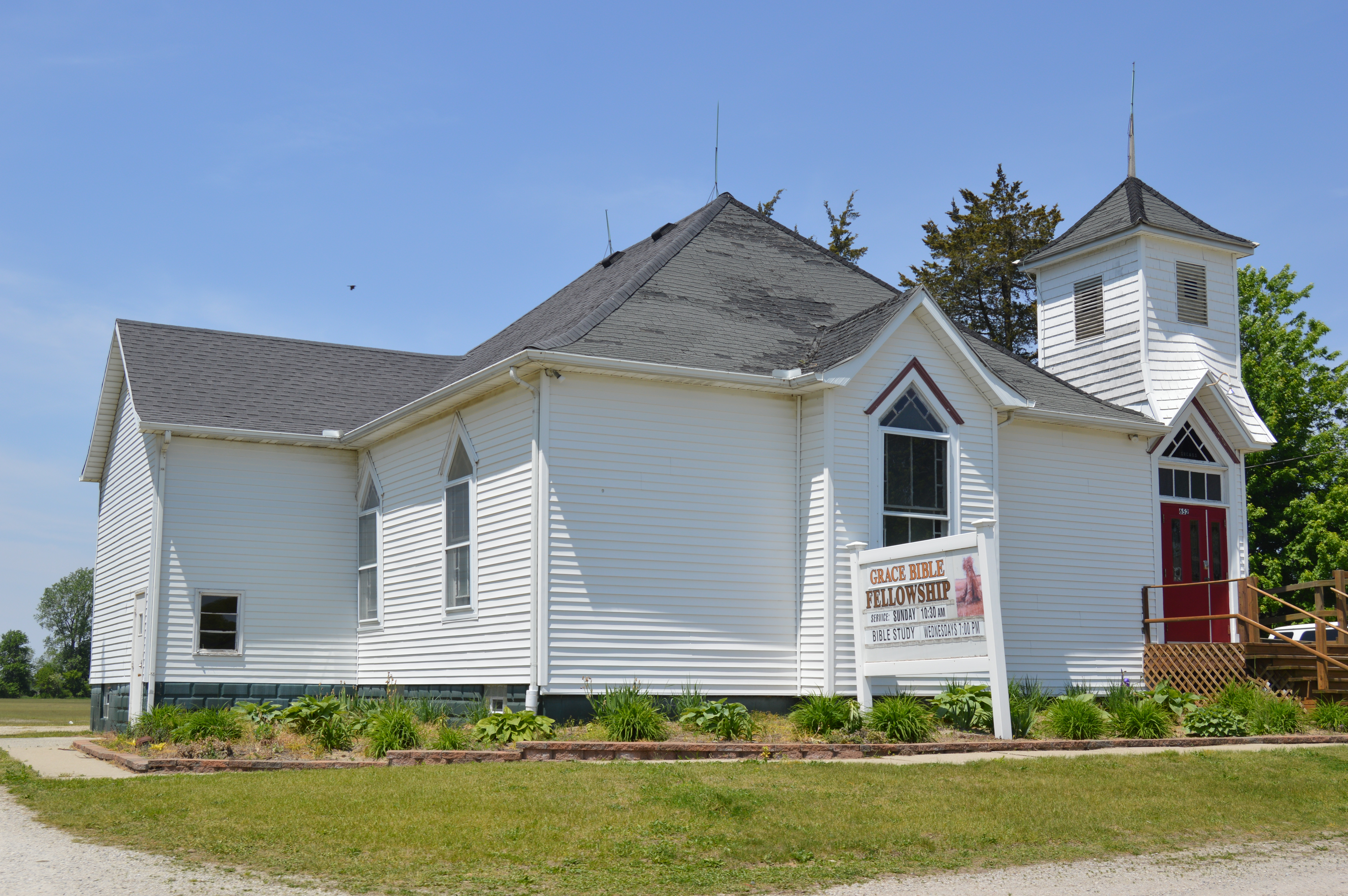
- Grace Bible Fellowship on Berkey Southern Road

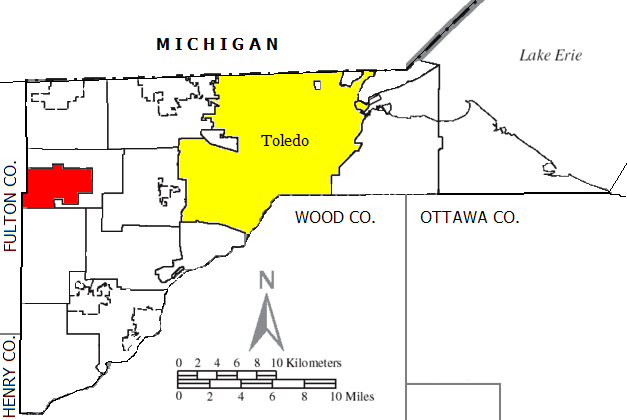
- Location of Harding Township in Lucas County, Ohio
- Coordinates: 41°37′1″N 83°50′22″W
- Country: United States
- State: Ohio
- County: Lucas

Area
  - Total: 9.4 sq mi (24.3 km^{2})
  - Land: 9.4 sq mi (24.3 km^{2})
  - Water: 0 sq mi (0.0 km^{2})
- Elevation: 669 ft (204 m)

Population (2020)
  - Total: 726
  - Density: 77.4/sq mi (29.9/km^{2})
- Time zone: UTC-5 (Eastern (EST))
  - Summer (DST): UTC-4 (EDT)
- FIPS code: 39-33418
- GNIS feature ID: 1086525
- Website: Official website

Harding Township is one of the eleven townships of Lucas County, Ohio, United States. The 2020 census found 726 people in the township.

== Geography ==
In the western part of the county, Harding Township borders the following townships:

- Spencer Township - north and east
- Swanton Township - south
- Fulton Township, Fulton County - west

No municipalities are present in Harding Township. The unincorporated community of Sharples is located in Harding Township near Sharples Cemetery. The Spencer-Sharples Local School District was annexed to the Toledo City School District on 1 January 1968.

== Name and history ==
It is the only Harding Township statewide.

== Government ==
The township is governed by a three-member board of trustees, who are elected in November of odd-numbered years to a four-year term beginning on the following January 1. Two are elected in the year after the presidential election and one is elected in the year before it. There is also an elected township fiscal officer, who serves a four-year term beginning on April 1 of the year after the election, which is held in November of the year before the presidential election. Vacancies in the fiscal officership or on the board of trustees are filled by the remaining trustees.
