= Peter Manor =

Peter Manor (c. 1778–1847) was best known as the founder of the town of Providence, Ohio. Of French-Canadian descent, Manor was a fur trader in northwest Ohio starting in the late 18th century. Native Americans in the area, primarily Odawa, considered him a friend, which helped his business. He continued to trade with Native Americans and opened up a trading post that operated until approximately the early 19th century.

== Development of Providence ==
The defeat in 1794 of Indians in the Northwest Indian War, followed by the waging and conclusion of the War of 1812 with a preservation of US borders, resulted in increased pressure on the federal government by settlers to open up these lands to European-American settlement. The government made treaties with area tribes by which they ceded large blocks of land. In the 1830s, many were encouraged to agree to removal in the 1830s to areas of Indian Territory west of the Mississippi River, in future Kansas and Oklahoma. For instance, the last of the Odawa bands from northwestern Ohio left this area by 1839 (Rozick, 10-11).

In 1822, Manor had constructed a sawmill and gristmill on the Maumee River in what became Providence, Ohio to encourage settlement and ensure he would have a business (Rozick, 12). He wanted to prepare for the influx of settlers he expected as the Northwest was being developed.

In 1835, Manor began developing the town of Providence. In this same period, the state of Ohio began development of what was to be the Wabash and Erie Canal through the town. Later, this section would be referred to as being a part of the Miami and Erie Canal. Specifically, the state decided that the canal should run through the site of Manor's Mill on the river. In 1838, the state of Ohio took possession of Manor's mill through eminent domain and demolished it to construct the canal (Rozick, 12). Manor rebuilt the mill in another location. As a result of a deal made with Ohio, Manor obtained perpetual water rights at his new mill (Emmons). Eventually, Manor sold the mill.(Rozick, 13)

He continued to be active in the community of Providence until his death in September 1847 (Rozick, 13). It managed to preserve a higher quality of life and was nearly free of the problems of drinking, gambling, and prostitution which typically plagued canal towns.

The construction of railroads through Ohio bypassed Providence and drew off traffic from the canal. The town's economy suffered a steep decline in the late 19th century. Eventually residents abandoned this location for ones with railroad access.

== Sources ==
- Emmons, Michael J. Grinding through Time: The Historic Isaac Ludwig Mill, Metroparks of Toledo. Available at https://web.archive.org/web/20070501053002/http://www.metroparkstoledo.com/metroparks/providence/display.asp?id=223&subj=providence
- Rozick, Janet E. Side Cut, Farnsworth, Bend View, and Providence Metroparks, Metroparks of Toledo. Available at: https://web.archive.org/web/20070928221624/http://www.metroparkstoledo.com/metroparks/content/files/side_cut_farnsworth_bv_and_providence.doc
