= Richfield Center, Ohio =

Unincorporated community in Ohio, U.S.

Coordinates: 41°41′8″N 83°49′4″W

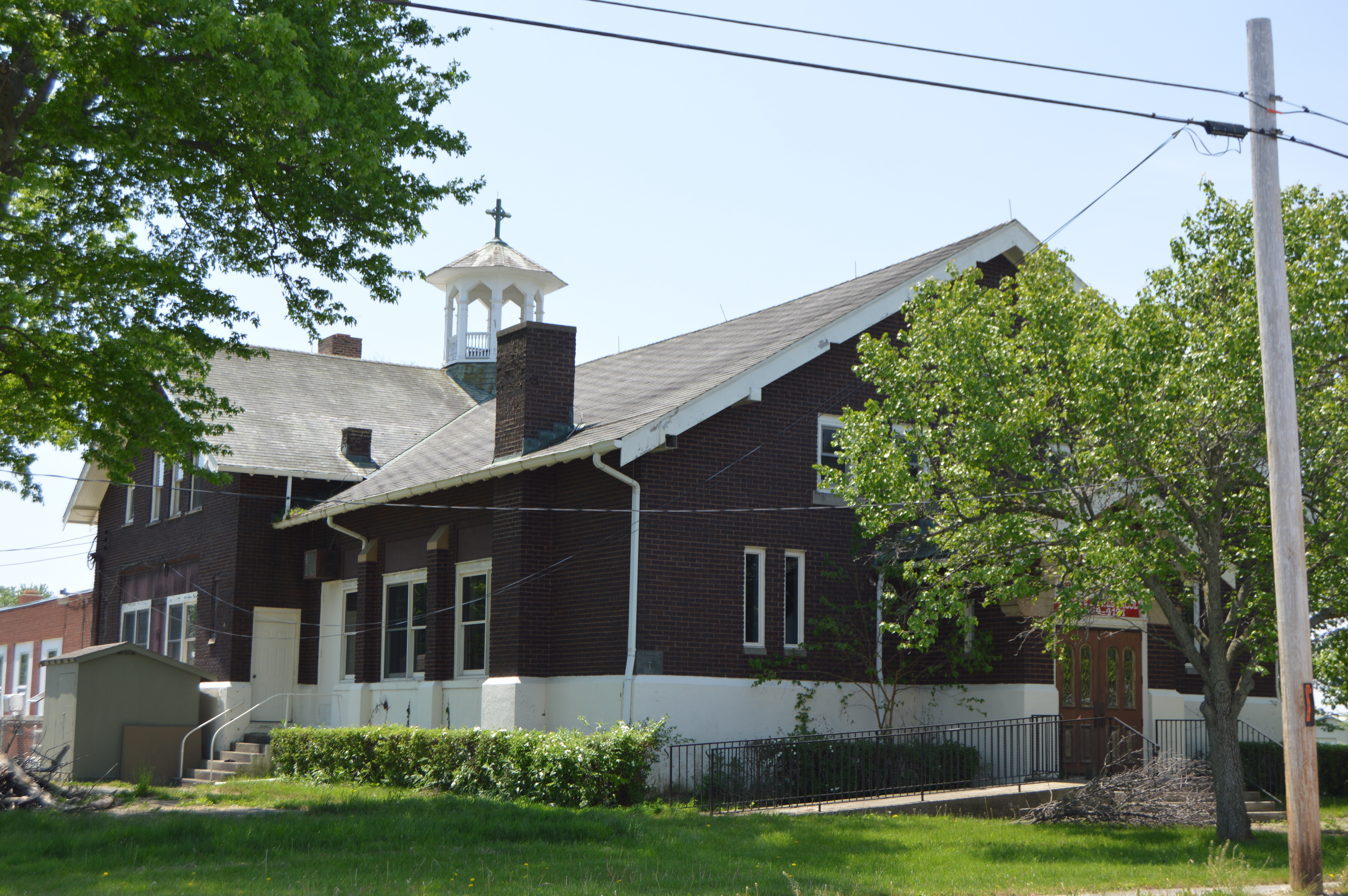
Former school on Sylvania Avenue

Richfield Center is an unincorporated community in Lucas County, in the U.S. state of Ohio.

== History ==
A post office called Richfield Centre was established in 1874, the name was changed to Richfield Center in 1893, and the post office closed in 1901. The community is located in Richfield Township, from which it takes its name. In 1910, Richfield Center had 111 inhabitants.
