= Marengo, Lucas County, Ohio =

Coordinates: 41°35′50″N 83°36′10″W

Marengo is an extinct town in Lucas County, in the U.S. state of Ohio. It was located in Adams Township, which formerly lay to the west of Toledo and has since been incorporated within the city limits.

== History ==
In the spring of 1836, nineteen men together paid $40,000 for tracts No. 17 and 18 of the Twelve Mile Square Reserve. They named the town Marengo, and laid out about 500 lots. The town site was expected to be located on the Wabash Canal, but the town grew much slower than expected, and it was abandoned by 1838.

The land purchased for the town is the area today roughly bounded to the north by Sherwood Ave., to the southwest by South Byrne Rd., and to the southeast by the Maumee River. The name of the town is preserved by Marengo Street in southwest Toledo and Marengo Island in the Maumee River.
