= Monclova, Ohio =

- Unincorporated community
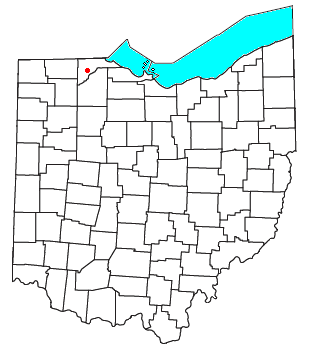
- Location of Monclova, Ohio
- Coordinates: 41°33′31″N 83°43′59″W
- Country: United States
- State: Ohio
- County: Lucas
- Township: Monclova
- Elevation: 637 ft (194 m)
- Time zone: UTC-5 (Eastern (EST))
  - Summer (DST): UTC-4 (EDT)
- ZIP codes: 43542
- GNIS feature ID: 1056430
- Website: http://monclovatwp.org

Monclova is an unincorporated community in central Monclova Township, Lucas County, Ohio, United States. It has a post office with the ZIP code 43542.

== History ==
Monclova was laid out in 1836. A post office has been in operation at Monclova since 1852.

The public school Monclova Elementary (previously Primary) School is located there, as well as one of the trailheads for the Wabash Cannonball Trail.
