= Frankfort, Lucas County, Ohio =

Unincorporated community in Ohio, U.S.

Coordinates: 41.6439°N 83.8564°W

Frankfort is an unincorporated community in Spencer Township, Lucas County, in the U.S. state of Ohio.

== History ==
Variant names of the community were Java and Frankfort Corners. A post office was established under the name Java in 1848, and remained in operation until 1901.
