= Richfield Township, Lucas County, Ohio =

Township in Ohio, US

- Township
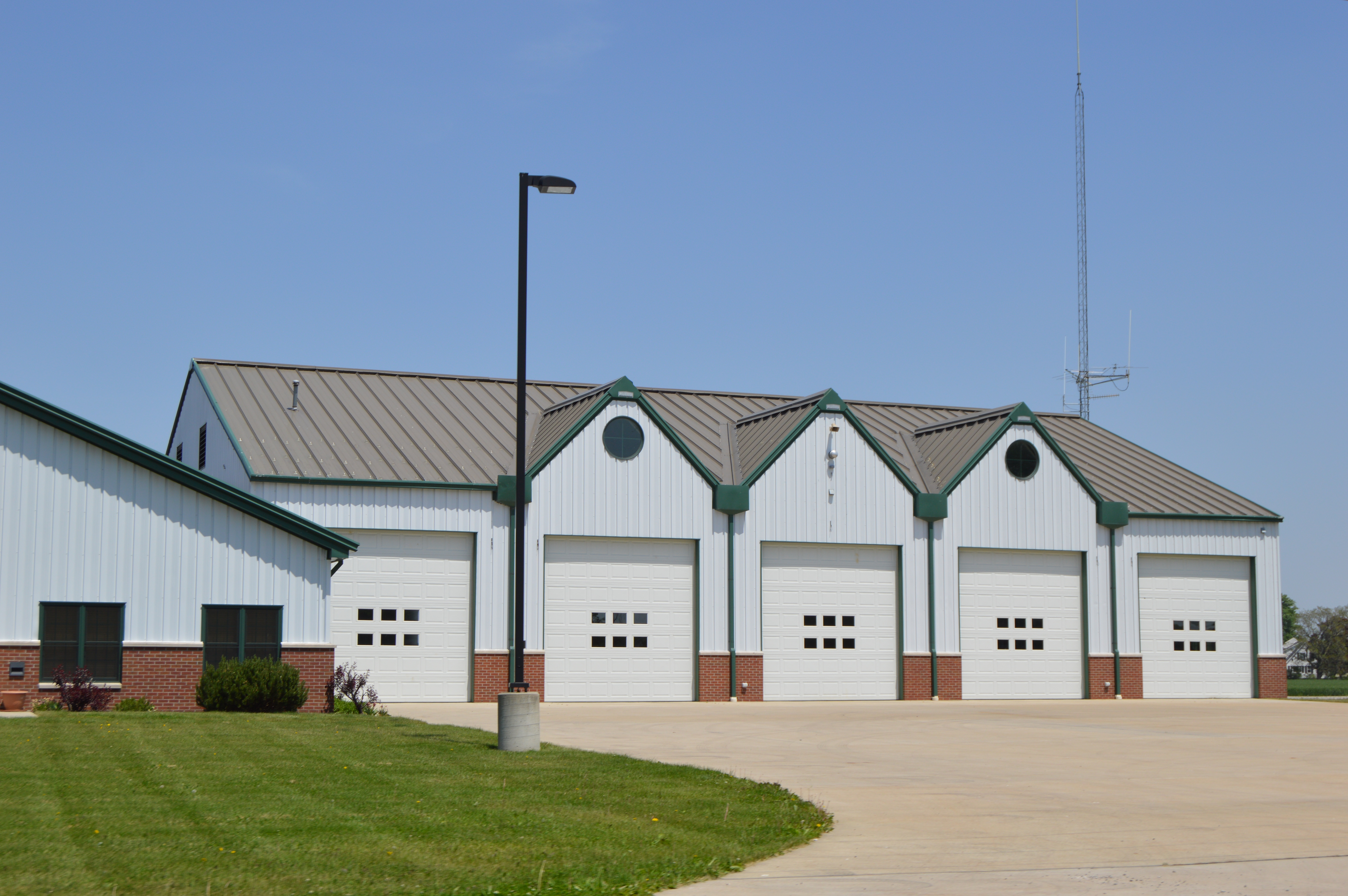
- Township fire station at Richfield Center

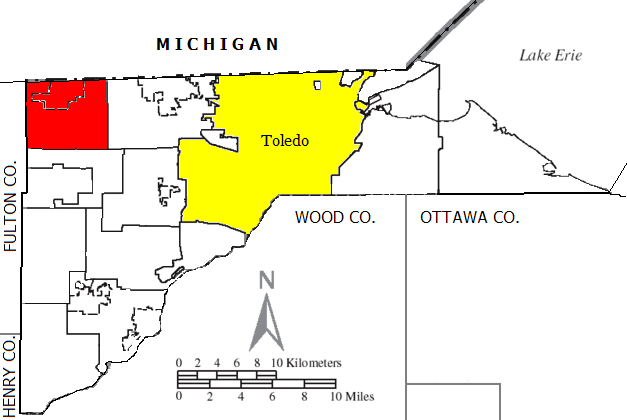
- Location of Richfield Township in Lucas County, Ohio
- Coordinates: 41°41′36″N 83°48′59″W
- Country: United States
- State: Ohio
- County: Lucas

Area
  - Total: 22.5 sq mi (58.3 km^{2})
  - Land: 22.5 sq mi (58.3 km^{2})
  - Water: 0 sq mi (0.0 km^{2})
- Elevation: 692 ft (211 m)

Population (2020)
  - Total: 1,575
  - Density: 70.0/sq mi (27.0/km^{2})
- Time zone: UTC-5 (Eastern (EST))
  - Summer (DST): UTC-4 (EDT)
- FIPS code: 39-66516
- GNIS feature ID: 1086532
- Website: www.richfieldtwp.com

Richfield Township is one of the eleven townships of Lucas County, Ohio, United States. The 2020 census found 1,575 people in the township.

== Geography ==
Located in the northwestern corner part of the county, it borders the following townships:

- Riga Township, Lenawee County, Michigan - north
- Sylvania Township - east
- Spencer Township - south
- Fulton Township, Fulton County - southwest corner
- Amboy Township, Fulton County - west
- Ogden Township, Lenawee County, Michigan - northwest corner

The village of Berkey lies in northwestern Richfield Township, and the unincorporated community of Richfield Center is located in the center of the township.

== Name and history ==
Statewide, other Richfield Townships are located in Henry and Summit counties.

== Government ==
The township is governed by a three-member board of trustees, who are elected in November of odd-numbered years to a four-year term beginning on the following January 1. Two are elected in the year after the presidential election and one is elected in the year before it. There is also an elected township fiscal officer, who serves a four-year term beginning on April 1 of the year after the election, which is held in November of the year before the presidential election. Vacancies in the fiscal officership or on the board of trustees are filled by the remaining trustees.
