= Parochial and private schools in Lucas County, Ohio =

The following is a list of parochial and private schools in Lucas County, Northwest Ohio. These schools are located in Lucas County but serves students who live throughout Lucas County, Fulton County, Ottawa County, and Wood County.

== Grades 9-12 ==
- Apostolic Christian Academy (Toledo, Ohio) (Co-ed, Christian)
- Cardinal Stritch High School (Oregon, Ohio) (Co-ed, Catholic)
- Central Catholic High School (Toledo, Ohio) (Co-ed, Catholic)
- Emmanuel Christian School (Toledo, Ohio) (Co-ed, Christian)
- Monclova Christian Academy (Monclova, Ohio) (Co-ed, Christian)
- Notre Dame Academy (Toledo, Ohio) (Females only, Catholic)
- St. Francis De Sales High School (Toledo, Ohio) (Males only, Catholic)
- St. John's Jesuit High School (Toledo, Ohio)(Toledo, Ohio) (Males only, Catholic)
- St. Ursula Academy (Toledo, Ohio) (Females only, Catholic)
- Toledo Christian School (Toledo, Ohio) (Co-ed, Christian)
- Toledo Islamic Academy (Toledo, Ohio) (Co-ed, Muslim)

== Grades K-12 ==
- Apostolic Christian Academy (Toledo, Ohio)
- Cardinal Stritch Catholic High School and Academy (Oregon, Ohio)
- Emmanuel Christian (Toledo, Ohio)
- Monclova Christian Academy (Monclova, Ohio)
- Toledo Christian
- Toledo Islamic Academy

== Grades K-8 ==
- All Saints School
- Blessed Sacrament School
- Body of Christ School
- Christ the King School
- Gesu School
- Our Lady Of Perpetual Help School
- Regina Coeli School
- Rosary Cathedral School
- Saint Benedict School
- Saint Joan of Arc
- Saint Joseph School, Sylvania
- Saint Joseph School, Maumee
- Saint Patrick of Heatherdowns
- Saint Pius X School
- Trinity Lutheran School
- West Side Montessori School (13 months - 8th grade)

== Grades PK ==
- Little Miracles Montessori School
- Montessori Day School
- St. Catherine of Siena Early Childhood Center

== Parochial or private schools that have closed ==
- Franciscan Academy, Sylvania (closed in 2014)
- Hebrew Academy of Toledo (closed 2011)
- Holy Rosary School (merged with St. Stephen School, then closed)
- Ladyfield School (closed in 2005 due to low enrollment)
- Little Flower School (merged with Our Lady of Lourdes School in fall 2010 to form St. Benedict School)
- Mary Immaculate School (closed 2013)
- Pope John Paul II School (closed 2008)
- Queen of Peace School (merged with St. James School to form Queen of Apostles School)
- Our Lady of Lourdes School (merged with Little Flower in fall 2010 to form St. Benedict School)
- Sacred Heart School (Merged with several other parish schools to form Kateri Catholic Academy, now renamed Cardinal Stritch Academy)
- Saint Adalbert School (merged with St. Hedwig School in 2005 to form Pope John Paul II school, and the merged school closed in 2008)
- Saint Agnes School (closed 2005)
- Saint Charles School (closed)
- Saint Clement School (closed - campus is now used for the Autism Model School, a public community school)
- Saint Elizabeth Seton School (closed 2007)
- Saint Hedwig School (Merged with St. Adalbert School in 2005 to form Pope John Paul II school, and the merged school closed in 2008)
- Saint Hyacinth School (closed in 2005)
- Saint James School (merged with Queen of Peace School to form Queen of Apostles School)
- Saint Jerome School (Merged with several other parish schools to form Kateri Catholic Academy, now renamed Cardinal Stritch Academy)
- Saint John the Baptist School (closed in 2016 due to low enrollment)
- Saint Jude Elementary School (closed)
- Saint Martin DePorres School (closed)
- Saint Mary School (closed)
- Saint Stephen School (merged with Holy Rosary School, then closed)
- Saint Thomas Aquinas School (Merged with several other parish schools to form Kateri Catholic Academy, now renamed Cardinal Stritch Academy)
