= Spencer Township, Lucas County, Ohio =

Township in Ohio, US

- Township
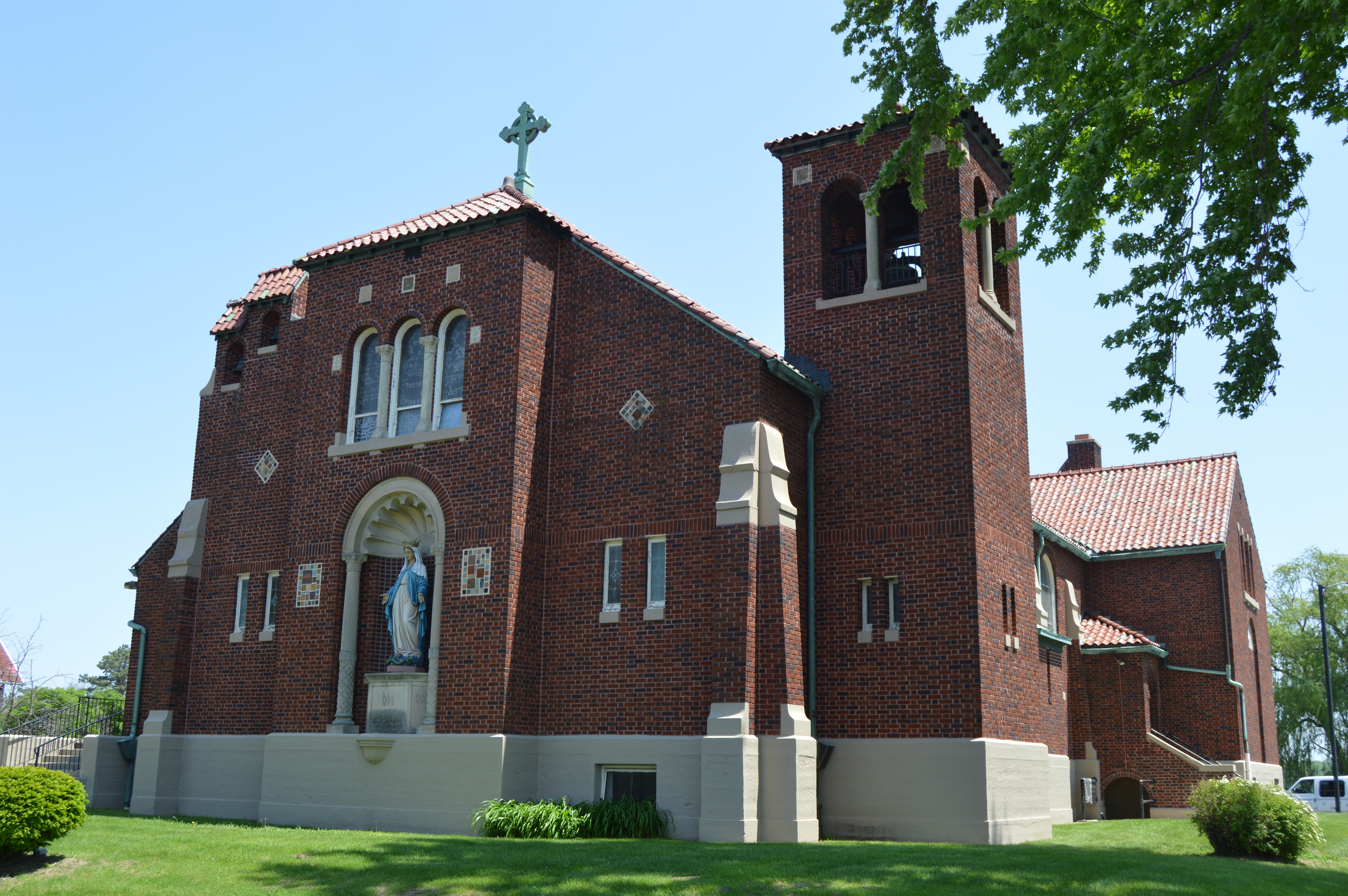
- Immaculate Conception Catholic Church

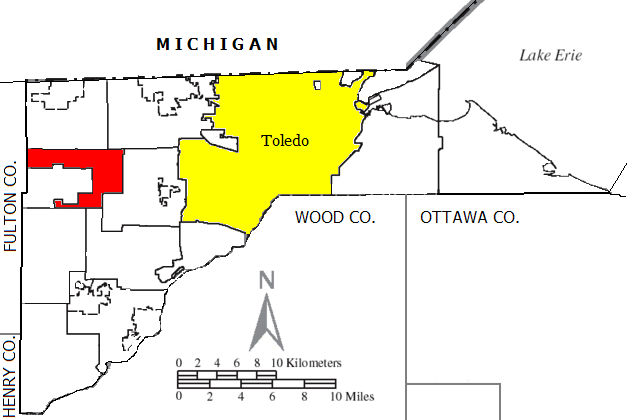
- Spencer Township, Lucas County
- Coordinates: 41°38′24″N 83°48′39″W
- Country: United States
- State: Ohio
- County: Lucas

Area
  - Total: 12.1 sq mi (31.4 km^{2})
  - Land: 12.1 sq mi (31.4 km^{2})
  - Water: 0 sq mi (0.0 km^{2})
- Elevation: 669 ft (204 m)

Population (2020)
  - Total: 1,746
  - Density: 144/sq mi (55.6/km^{2})
- Time zone: UTC-5 (Eastern (EST))
  - Summer (DST): UTC-4 (EDT)
- FIPS code: 39-73990
- GNIS feature ID: 1086533
- Website: spencertownship.org

Spencer Township is one of the eleven townships of Lucas County, Ohio, United States. The 2020 census found 1,746 people in the township.

== Geography ==
Located in the western part of the county, it borders the following townships:

- Richfield Township - north
- Sylvania Township - northeast
- Springfield Township - east
- Monclova Township - southeast
- Swanton Township - south
- Harding Township - southwest
- Fulton Township, Fulton County - west
- Amboy Township, Fulton County - northwest corner

No municipalities are located in Spencer Township, although the unincorporated community of Frankfort lies in the township's west.

== Name ==
Statewide, other Spencer Townships are located in Allen, Guernsey, and Medina counties and formerly in Hamilton County.

== History ==
Spencer Township was established in 1845.

== Government ==
The township is governed by a three-member board of trustees, who are elected in November of odd-numbered years to a four-year term beginning on the following January 1. Two are elected in the year after the presidential election and one is elected in the year before it. There is also an elected township fiscal officer, who serves a four-year term beginning on April 1 of the year after the election, which is held in November of the year before the presidential election. Vacancies in the fiscal officership or on the board of trustees are filled by the remaining trustees.
