= Yondota, Ohio =

Unincorporated community in Ohio, U.S.

Coordinates: 41°38′19″N 83°18′44″W

Yondota is an unincorporated community in Lucas County, in the U.S. state of Ohio.

== History ==
A post office called Yondota was established in 1895, and remained in operation until 1906. The name Yondota may be derived from Wyandot.
