= Berkey, Ohio =

Village in the United States

- Village
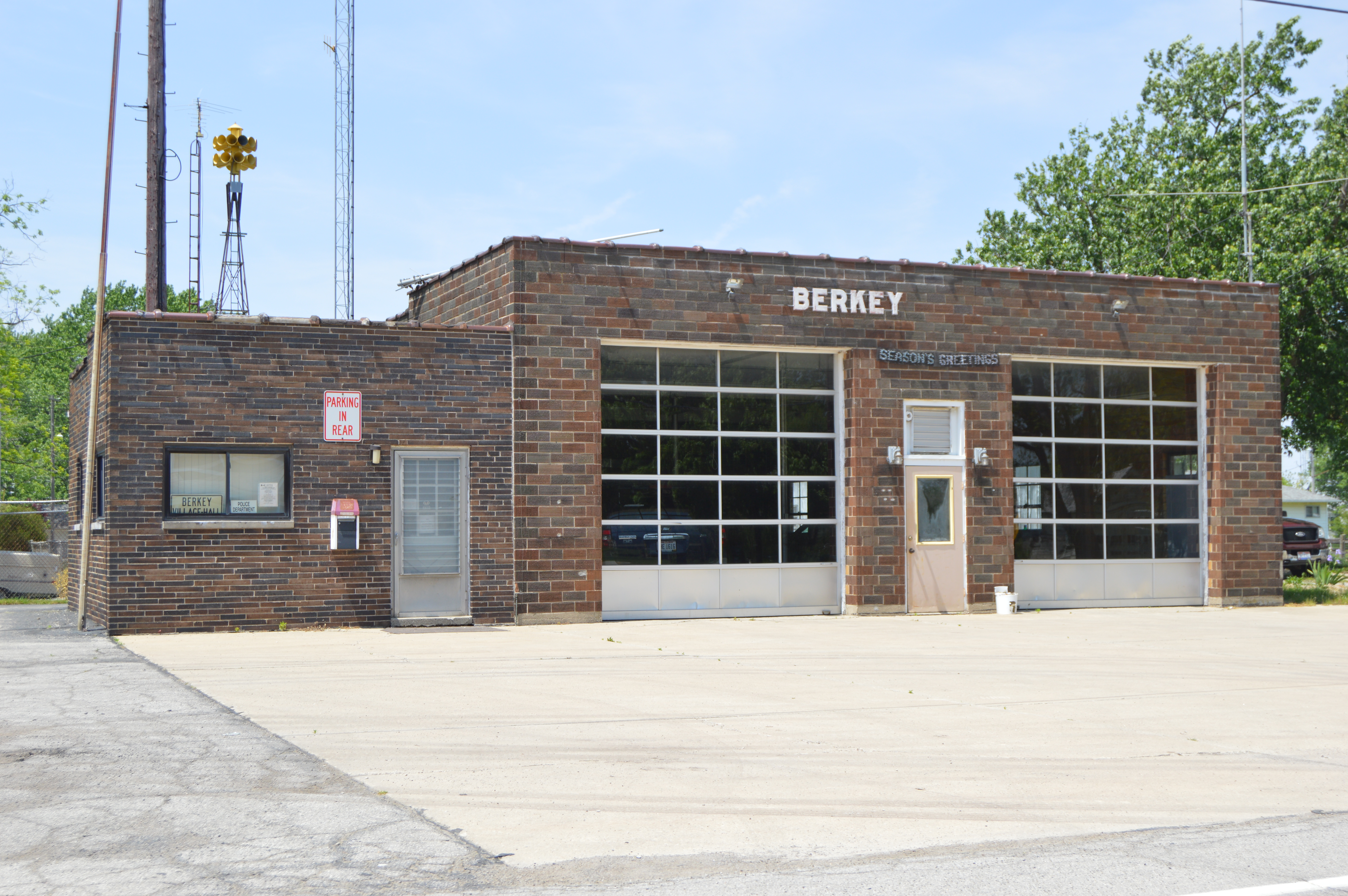
- Village Hall

- Location in Lucas County and the state of Ohio.
- Coordinates: 41°42′30″N 83°50′18″W
- Country: United States
- State: Ohio
- County: Lucas

Area
  - Total: 4.24 sq mi (10.98 km^{2})
  - Land: 4.24 sq mi (10.98 km^{2})
  - Water: 0 sq mi (0.00 km^{2})
- Elevation: 702 ft (214 m)

Population (2020)
  - Total: 275
  - Estimate (2023): 284
  - Density: 64.9/sq mi (25.05/km^{2})
- Time zone: UTC-5 (Eastern (EST))
  - Summer (DST): UTC-4 (EDT)
- ZIP code: 43504
- Area code: 419
- FIPS code: 39-05732
- GNIS feature ID: 2398102
- Website: www.berkeyohio.org

Berkey is a village in Lucas County, Ohio, United States. The population was 275 at the 2020 census.

== History ==
Berkey was originally called Riga. The present name is derived from Richard K. Berkeybile, an early postmaster. A post office called Riga was established in 1837, and the name was changed to Berkey in 1870.

== Geography ==
According to the United States Census Bureau, the village has a total area of 4.18 square miles (10.83 km^{2}), all land.

== Demographics ==
Historical population
Census	Pop.	Note	%±
1920	201		—
1930	261		29.9%
1940	248		−5.0%
1950	239		−3.6%
1960	257		7.5%
1970	294		14.4%
1980	306		4.1%
1990	264		−13.7%
2000	265		0.4%
2010	237		−10.6%
2020	275		16.0%
2023 (est.)	284	▲	3.3%
U.S. Decennial Census

=== 2010 census ===
At the 2010 census there were 237 people, 99 households, and 73 families living in the village. The population density was 56.7 inhabitants per square mile (21.9/km^{2}). There were 112 housing units at an average density of 26.8 per square mile (10.3/km^{2}). The racial makeup of the village was 99.2% White and 0.8% Asian. Hispanic or Latino of any race were 1.3%.

Of the 99 households 28.3% had children under the age of 18 living with them, 63.6% were married couples living together, 9.1% had a female householder with no husband present, 1.0% had a male householder with no wife present, and 26.3% were non-families. 22.2% of households were one person and 11.2% were one person aged 65 or older. The average household size was 2.39 and the average family size was 2.77.

The median age in the village was 48.2 years. 21.1% of residents were under the age of 18; 5% were between the ages of 18 and 24; 18.6% were from 25 to 44; 37.2% were from 45 to 64; and 18.1% were 65 or older. The gender makeup of the village was 51.1% male and 48.9% female.

=== 2000 census ===
At the 2000 census there were 265 people, 98 households, and 81 families living in the village. The population density was 63.5 inhabitants per square mile (24.5/km^{2}). There were 100 housing units at an average density of 23.9 per square mile (9.2/km^{2}). The racial makeup of the village was 98.11% White, 0.75% Native American, 0.38% Asian, and 0.75% from two or more races. Hispanic or Latino of any race were 0.38%.

Of the 98 households 39.8% had children under the age of 18 living with them, 69.4% were married couples living together, 10.2% had a female householder with no husband present, and 17.3% were non-families. 15.3% of households were one person and 8.2% were one person aged 65 or older. The average household size was 2.70 and the average family size was 3.04.

The age distribution was 29.4% under the age of 18, 3.8% from 18 to 24, 30.2% from 25 to 44, 25.3% from 45 to 64, and 11.3% 65 or older. The median age was 37 years. For every 100 females there were 90.6 males. For every 100 females age 18 and over, there were 94.8 males.

The median household income was $60,500 and the median family income was $65,313. Males had a median income of $46,000 versus $31,875 for females. The per capita income for the village was $25,944. None of the population or families were below the poverty line.
