= Swanton Township, Lucas County, Ohio =

Township in Ohio, US

- Township
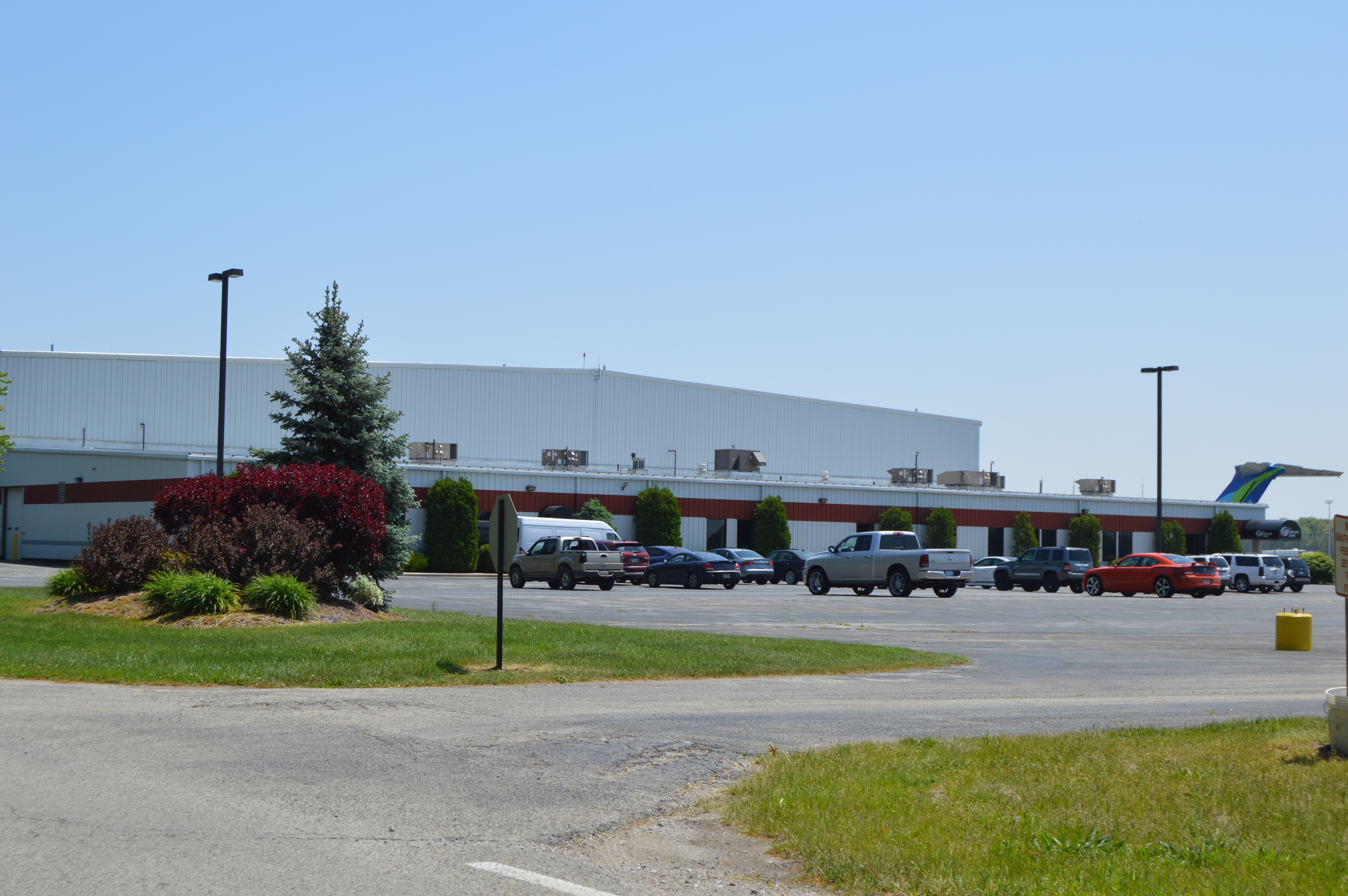
- Facilities at Toledo Express Airport

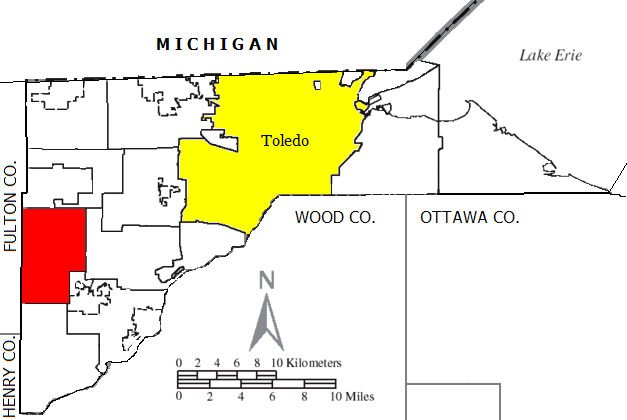
- Location of Swanton Township in Lucas County
- Coordinates: 41°34′3″N 83°50′48″W
- Country: United States
- State: Ohio
- County: Lucas

Area
  - Total: 22.1 sq mi (57.2 km^{2})
  - Land: 22.0 sq mi (57.1 km^{2})
  - Water: 0.039 sq mi (0.1 km^{2})
- Elevation: 676 ft (206 m)

Population (2020)
  - Total: 2,822
  - Density: 128/sq mi (49.4/km^{2})
- Time zone: UTC-5 (Eastern (EST))
  - Summer (DST): UTC-4 (EDT)
- FIPS code: 39-75903
- GNIS feature ID: 1086535
- Website: www.swantontwp.org

Swanton Township is one of the eleven townships of Lucas County, Ohio, United States. The 2020 census found 2,822 people in the township.

== Geography ==
Located in the western part of the county, it borders the following townships:

- Harding Township - north
- Spencer Township - northeast
- Monclova Township - east
- Waterville Township - southeast
- Providence Township - south
- Swan Creek Township, Fulton County - west
- Fulton Township, Fulton County - northwest

A small part of the village of Swanton is located in northwestern Swanton Township.

== Name and history ==
Formed in the 1830s, Swanton Township was originally called Wing Township after Chandler Wing, an early settler. Its name was changed to Swanton Township effective April 7, 1851. It is the only Swanton Township statewide.

On October 29, 1960, the Cal Poly football team plane crash occurred in the township, killing 22 of the 48 people on board.

== Government ==
The township is governed by a three-member board of trustees, who are elected in November of odd-numbered years to a four-year term beginning on the following January 1. Two are elected in the year after the presidential election and one is elected in the year before it. There is also an elected township fiscal officer, who serves a four-year term beginning on April 1 of the year after the election, which is held in November of the year before the presidential election. Vacancies in the fiscal officership or on the board of trustees are filled by the remaining trustees.
