= Lucas County, Ohio =

County in Ohio, United States

- County
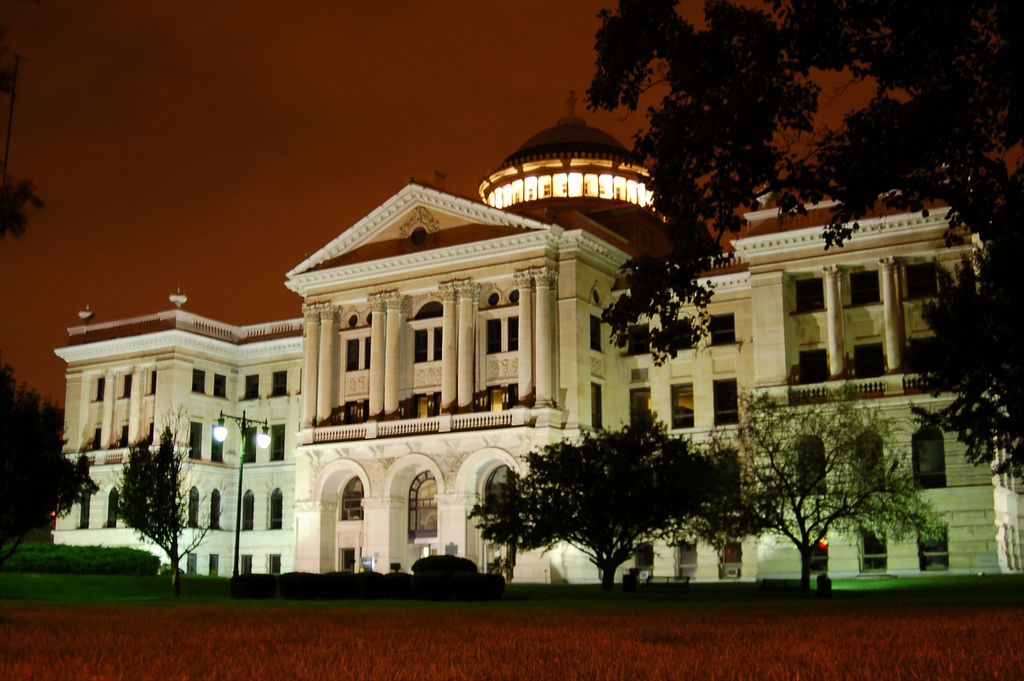
- The Lucas County Courthouse in Toledo

- Flag Seal

- Location within the U.S. state of Ohio
- Coordinates: 41°41′N 83°30′W
- Country: United States
- State: Ohio
- Founded: June 20, 1835
- Named for: Robert Lucas
- Seat: Toledo
- Largest city: Toledo

Area
  - Total: 596 sq mi (1,540 km^{2})
  - Land: 341 sq mi (880 km^{2})
  - Water: 255 sq mi (660 km^{2}) 43%

Population (2020)
  - Total: 431,279
  - Estimate (2025): 423,347 ▼
  - Density: 1,260/sq mi (488/km^{2})
- Time zone: UTC−5 (Eastern)
  - Summer (DST): UTC−4 (EDT)
- Congressional district: 9th
- Website: co.lucas.oh.us

Lucas County is a county located in the northwestern part of the U.S. state of Ohio. It is bordered to the east by Lake Erie, and to the southeast by the Maumee River, which runs to the lake. As of the 2020 census, making it the sixth-most populous county in the state, the population was 431,279. Its county seat and most populous city is Toledo, located at the mouth of the Maumee River on the lake. The county was named for Robert Lucas, 12th governor of Ohio, in 1835 during his second term. Its establishment provoked the Toledo War conflict with the Michigan Territory, which claimed some of its area. Lucas County is the central county of the Toledo Metropolitan Statistical Area.

== History ==
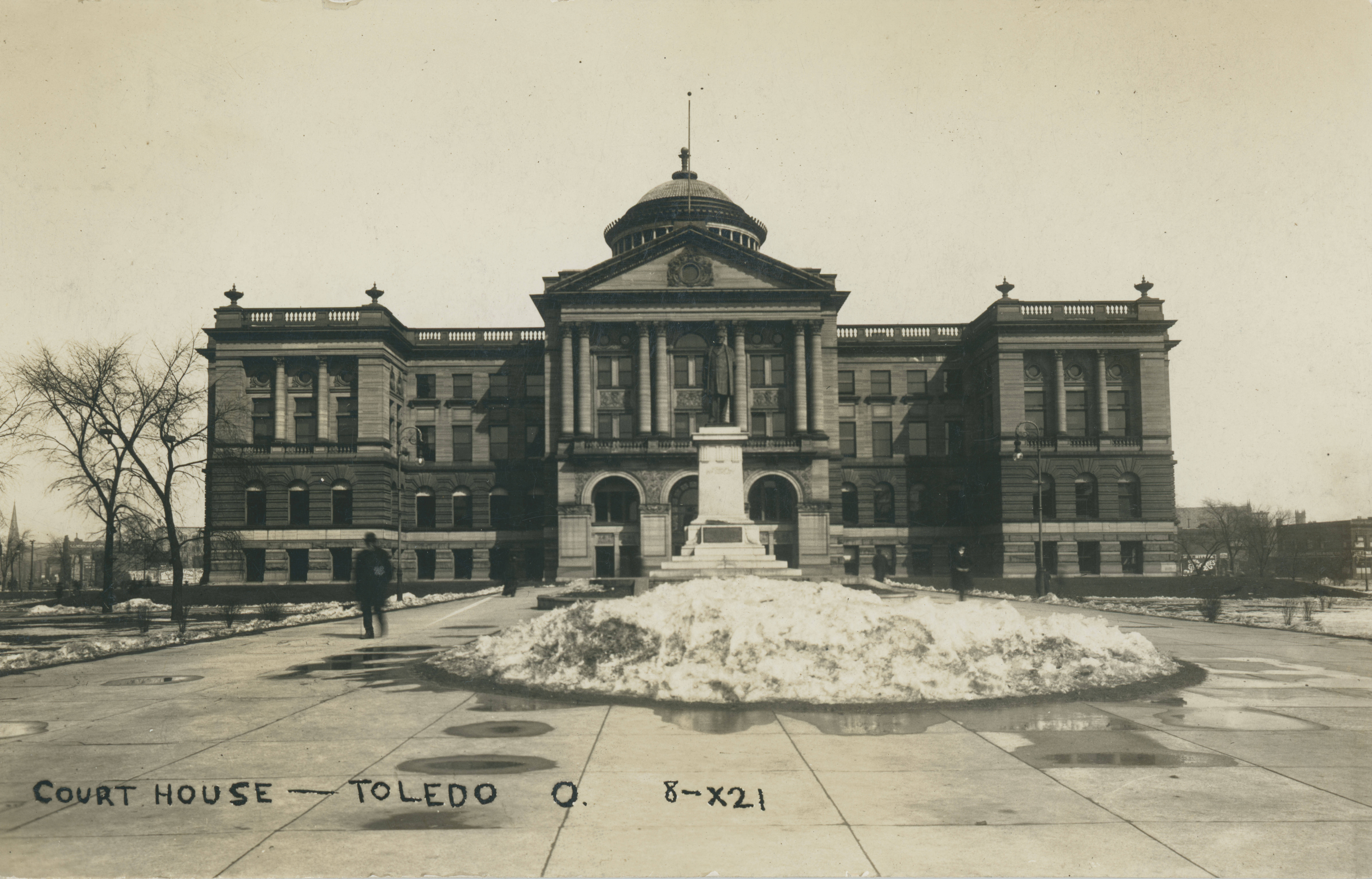
Lucas County Courthouse, 1910s

On August 20, 1794, near the site of the present-day town of Maumee, American forces led by General Anthony Wayne won a decisive victory over allied Indian forces at the Battle of Fallen Timbers after years of conflict in what was known as the Northwest Indian War. The defeat of the Native forces resulted in the opening of the entire Northwest Territory for white settlement. Northwest Ohio was occupied chiefly by villages and bands of the Odawa people, who had trading relations with the French at Fort Detroit since 1701. Other Odawa were located in southeast Michigan and further north on the peninsula. They ceded much of that territory in the Treaty of Greenville but retained control of lands along the Maumee River until after the War of 1812. The last Odawa band, that of Ottokee, grandson of Chief Pontiac, left the Maumee River area for Kansas in 1839.

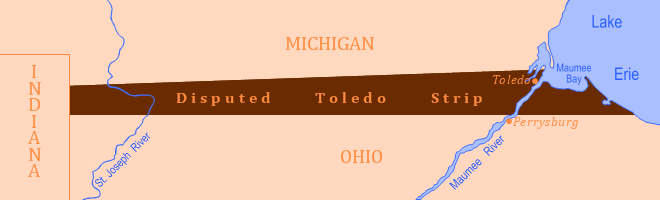
The disputed portion of Michigan Territory claimed by the state of Ohio, known as the Toledo Strip

Lucas County was established in 1835. At that time, both Ohio and Michigan Territory claimed sovereignty over a 468-square-mile (1,210 km^{2}) region along their border (see Toledo War). When Michigan petitioned Congress for statehood in 1835, it sought to include the disputed territory within its bounds. In response, the Ohio General Assembly formally organized part of the area as Lucas County, naming it after the incumbent governor of Ohio, Robert Lucas.

== Geography ==
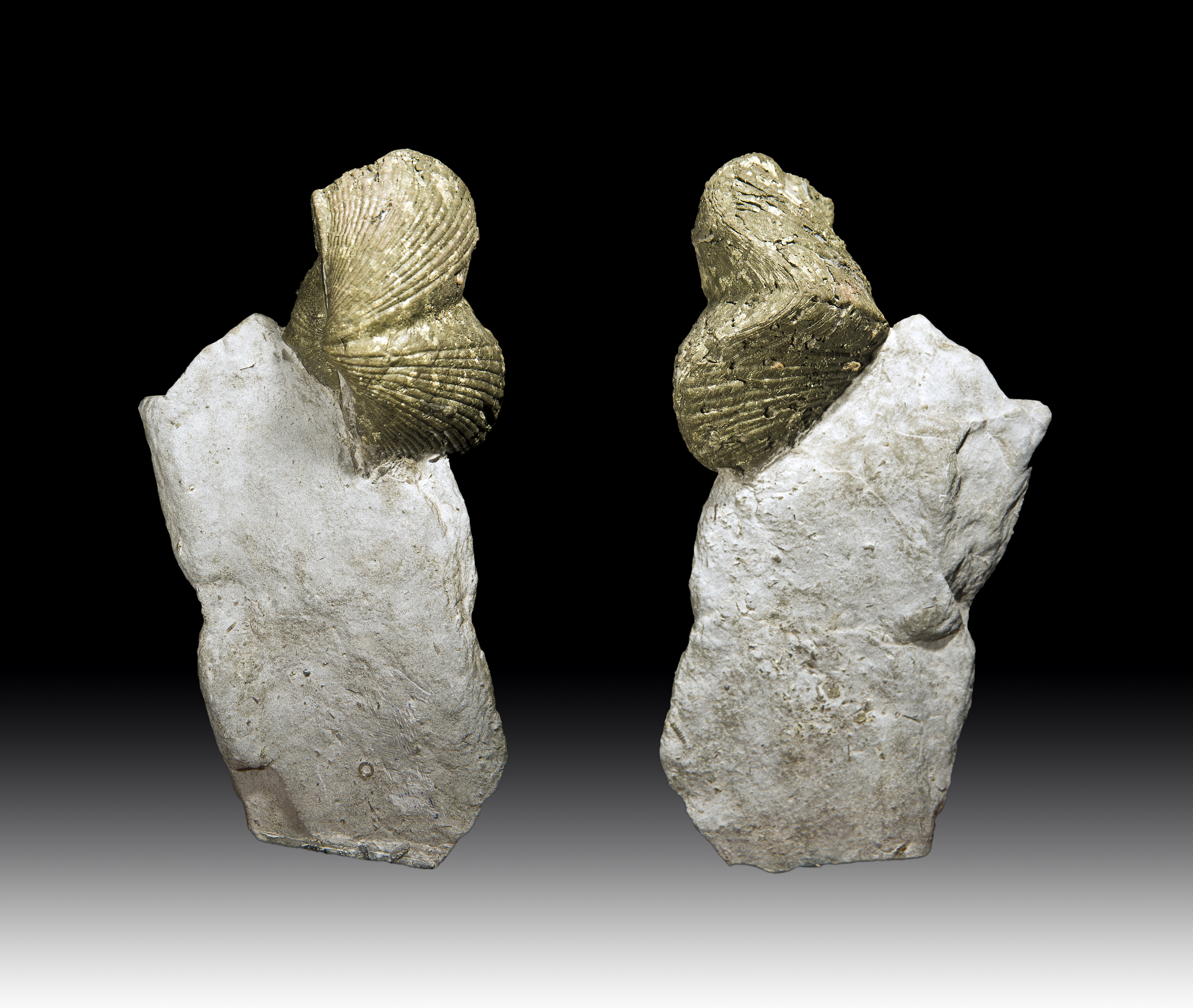
Devonian shell of Sylvania

According to the United States Census Bureau, the county has a total area of 596 square miles (1,540 km^{2}), of which 341 square miles (880 km^{2}) is land and 255 square miles (660 km^{2}) (43%) is water. It is the fourth-smallest county in Ohio by land area. Much of the county lies within what was at the time of its establishment, a vast network of forests, wetlands, and grasslands known as the Great Black Swamp.

=== Rivers ===
- Maumee River
- Ottawa River

=== Adjacent counties ===
- Monroe County, Michigan (north)
- Essex County, Ontario (northeast)
- Ottawa County (southeast)
- Wood County (south)
- Henry County (southwest)
- Fulton County (west)
- Lenawee County, Michigan (northwest)

=== National protected areas ===
- Cedar Point National Wildlife Refuge
- Ottawa National Wildlife Refuge (part)
- West Sister Island National Wildlife Refuge

=== Major highways ===
- I-73 (future)
- I-75
- I-80 / I-90 / Ohio Turnpike
- I-280
- I-475
- US 20
- US 20A
- US 23
- US 24
- US 223
- SR 2
- SR 25
- SR 51
- SR 64
- SR 65
- SR 120
- SR 184
- SR 246
- SR 295

== Demographics ==
Historical population
Census	Pop.	Note	%±
1840	9,382		—
1850	12,363		31.8%
1860	25,831		108.9%
1870	46,722		80.9%
1880	67,377		44.2%
1890	102,296		51.8%
1900	153,559		50.1%
1910	192,728		25.5%
1920	275,721		43.1%
1930	347,709		26.1%
1940	344,333		−1.0%
1950	395,551		14.9%
1960	456,931		15.5%
1970	484,370		6.0%
1980	471,741		−2.6%
1990	462,361		−2.0%
2000	455,054		−1.6%
2010	441,815		−2.9%
2020	431,279		−2.4%
2025 (est.)	423,347	▼	−1.8%
U.S. Decennial Census; 1790–1960 1900–1990; 1990–2000 2010–2020

=== Racial and ethnic composition ===
Lucas County, Ohio – Racial and ethnic composition Note: the US Census treats Hispanic/Latino as an ethnic category. This table excludes Latinos from the racial categories and assigns them to a separate category. Hispanics/Latinos may be of any race.
Race / ethnicity (NH = Non-Hispanic)	Pop 1980	Pop 1990	Pop 2000	Pop 2010	Pop 2020	% 1980	% 1990	% 2000	% 2010	% 2020
White alone (NH)	390,937	372,497	343,146	313,596	284,663	82.87%	80.56%	75.41%	70.98%	66.00%
Black or African American alone (NH)	63,494	67,856	76,495	82,541	83,398	13.46%	14.68%	16.81%	18.68%	19.34%
Native American or Alaska Native alone (NH)	791	1,037	942	955	817	0.17%	0.22%	0.21%	0.22%	0.19%
Asian alone (NH)	2,467	4,870	5,470	6,676	7,089	0.52%	1.05%	1.20%	1.51%	1.64%
Native Hawaiian or Pacific Islander alone (NH)	x	x	76	91	115	x	x	0.02%	0.02%	0.03%
Other race alone (NH)	1,569	443	699	678	1,926	0.33%	0.10%	0.15%	0.15%	0.45%
Mixed race or Multiracial (NH)	x	x	7,556	10,304	21,104	x	x	1.66%	2.33%	4.89%
Hispanic or Latino (any race)	12,483	15,658	20,670	26,974	32,167	2.65%	3.39%	4.54%	6.11%	7.46%
Total	471,741	462,361	455,054	441,815	431,279	100.00%	100.00%	100.00%	100.00%	100.00%

=== 2020 census ===
As of the 2020 census, the county had a population of 431,279. The median age was 38.9 years, with 22.4% of residents under the age of 18 and 17.3% 65 years of age or older. For every 100 females there were 94.3 males, and for every 100 females age 18 and over there were 91.4 males age 18 and over.

The racial makeup of the county was 68.4% White, 19.7% Black or African American, 0.3% American Indian and Alaska Native, 1.7% Asian, <0.1% Native Hawaiian and Pacific Islander, 2.4% from some other race, and 7.5% from two or more races. Hispanic or Latino residents of any race comprised 7.5% of the population.

95.0% of residents lived in urban areas, while 5.0% lived in rural areas.

There were 181,899 households in the county, of which 27.4% had children under the age of 18 living in them. Of all households, 36.8% were married-couple households, 22.1% were households with a male householder and no spouse or partner present, and 32.9% were households with a female householder and no spouse or partner present. About 34.1% of all households were made up of individuals and 12.8% had someone living alone who was 65 years of age or older.

There were 200,147 housing units, of which 9.1% were vacant. Among occupied housing units, 60.1% were owner-occupied and 39.9% were renter-occupied. The homeowner vacancy rate was 1.9% and the rental vacancy rate was 9.3%.

=== 2010 census ===
As of the 2010 census, there were 441,815 people, 180,267 households, and 111,016 families living in the county. The population density was 1,296.2 inhabitants per square mile (500.5/km^{2}). There were 202,630 housing units at an average density of 594.5 units per square mile (229.5 units/km^{2}). The racial makeup of the county was 74.0% white, 19.0% black or African American, 1.5% Asian, 0.3% American Indian, 2.0% from other races, and 3.1% from two or more races. Those of Hispanic or Latino origin made up 6.1% of the population. In terms of ancestry, 29.8% were German, 13.2% were Irish, 9.7% were Polish, 8.0% were English, and 3.8% were American.

Of the 180,267 households, 31.1% had children under the age of 18 living with them, 40.0% were married couples living together, 16.5% had a female householder with no husband present, 38.4% were non-families, and 31.4% of all households were made up of individuals. The average household size was 2.39 and the average family size was 3.01. The median age was 37.0 years.

The median income for a household in the county was $42,072 and the median income for a family was $54,855. Males had a median income of $46,806 versus $33,394 for females. The per capita income for the county was $23,981. About 14.0% of families and 18.0% of the population were below the poverty line, including 25.4% of those under age 18 and 8.7% of those age 65 or over.

=== 2000 census ===
As of the census of 2000, there were 455,054 people, 182,847 households, and 116,290 families living in the county. The population density was 1,337 inhabitants per square mile (516/km^{2}). There were 196,259 housing units at an average density of 576 units per square mile (222 units/km^{2}). The racial makeup of the county was 77.50% White, 16.98% Black or African American, 0.26% Native American, 1.21% Asian, 0.02% Pacific Islander, 1.86% from other races, and 2.16% from two or more races. 4.54% of the population were Hispanic or Latino of any race.

There were 182,847 households, out of which 31.10% had children under the age of 18 living with them, 44.70% were married couples living together, 14.70% had a female householder with no husband present, and 36.40% were non-families. 30.10% of all households were made up of individuals, and 10.50% had someone living alone who was 65 years of age or older. The average household size was 2.44 and the average family size was 3.06.

In the county, the population was spread out, with 26.30% under the age of 18, 9.80% from 18 to 24, 29.10% from 25 to 44, 21.70% from 45 to 64, and 13.10% who were 65 years of age or older. The median age was 35 years. For every 100 females there were 92.60 males. For every 100 females age 18 and over, there were 88.60 males.

The median income for a household in the county was $38,004, and the median income for a family was $48,190. Males had a median income of $39,415 versus $26,447 for females. The per capita income for the county was $20,518. About 10.70% of families and 13.90% of the population were below the poverty line, including 19.70% of those under age 18 and 8.70% of those age 65 or over.

== Economy ==
=== Top employers ===
According to the county's 2019 Comprehensive Annual Financial Report, the top ten employers in the county are:

#	Employer	# of employees
1	Promedica Health Services	11,517
2	University of Toledo	8,502
3	Fiat Chrysler – Toledo North Plant; Toledo South Plant	6,759
4	Mercy Health Partners	5,880
5	Toledo Public Schools	3,193
6	Lucas County	2,821
7	City of Toledo	2,748
8	Kroger	2,300
9	Walmart	1,954
10	General Motors – Powertrain	1,778

== Politics ==
Like most populous urban counties, Lucas County is a Democratic stronghold. The only Republicans to win a majority or plurality in the county since 1932 have been Thomas E. Dewey in 1944, Dwight D. Eisenhower in both 1952 and 1956, and Ronald Reagan in 1980 (plurality) and 1984. Although Ronald Reagan carried the county twice, no other Republican has won the county in the last 50 years. In 1972, for instance, it was one of only two counties in the entire state that supported George McGovern.

In the last five presidential elections, the Democratic candidate's margin of victory has ranged from 12.4% in 2024, the narrowest margin in the county since 1988, to 30.5% in the case of Barack Obama. The entirety of Lucas County, including Toledo, lies in Ohio's 9th congressional district, and it is represented by Marcy Kaptur, who is a member of the Congressional Progressive Caucus.

United States presidential election results for Lucas County, Ohio
Year	Republican		Democratic		Third party(ies)	
Year	No.	%	No.	%	No.	%
1856	1,639	41.07%	1,866	46.76%	486	12.18%
1860	2,889	58.85%	1,820	37.07%	200	4.07%
1864	3,790	64.40%	2,095	35.60%	0	0.00%
1868	4,873	61.22%	3,087	38.78%	0	0.00%
1872	5,253	62.66%	3,083	36.77%	48	0.57%
1876	6,524	54.55%	5,155	43.10%	281	2.35%
1880	7,157	52.67%	5,985	44.04%	447	3.29%
1884	8,341	51.86%	7,384	45.91%	360	2.24%
1888	9,443	51.29%	8,638	46.92%	331	1.80%
1892	11,211	52.02%	9,860	45.75%	481	2.23%
1896	16,758	54.45%	13,759	44.71%	259	0.84%
1900	17,128	51.20%	15,390	46.01%	932	2.79%
1904	22,924	67.33%	8,259	24.26%	2,862	8.41%
1908	18,715	48.46%	16,208	41.97%	3,697	9.57%
1912	5,622	14.95%	13,999	37.22%	17,989	47.83%
1916	16,711	33.01%	30,779	60.80%	3,136	6.19%
1920	52,449	59.08%	30,452	34.30%	5,868	6.61%
1924	53,670	55.39%	11,948	12.33%	31,284	32.28%
1928	78,435	63.21%	44,977	36.25%	669	0.54%
1932	47,796	40.83%	64,902	55.44%	4,362	3.73%
1936	45,853	34.48%	74,155	55.76%	12,971	9.75%
1940	76,405	49.50%	77,948	50.50%	0	0.00%
1944	77,247	50.37%	76,109	49.63%	0	0.00%
1948	66,798	46.76%	74,064	51.85%	1,991	1.39%
1952	97,490	51.71%	91,043	48.29%	0	0.00%
1956	100,501	53.15%	88,598	46.85%	0	0.00%
1960	94,679	47.94%	102,825	52.06%	0	0.00%
1964	57,782	31.08%	128,110	68.92%	0	0.00%
1968	69,403	38.98%	91,346	51.31%	17,288	9.71%
1972	88,401	48.38%	90,142	49.34%	4,166	2.28%
1976	76,069	41.36%	103,658	56.36%	4,180	2.27%
1980	86,653	45.30%	85,341	44.61%	19,304	10.09%
1984	100,285	50.25%	97,293	48.76%	1,976	0.99%
1988	83,788	45.27%	99,755	53.89%	1,552	0.84%
1992	63,297	31.18%	99,989	49.25%	39,733	19.57%
1996	58,120	31.98%	104,911	57.72%	18,716	10.30%
2000	73,342	39.15%	108,344	57.83%	5,664	3.02%
2004	87,160	39.54%	132,715	60.21%	555	0.25%
2008	73,706	33.43%	142,852	64.80%	3,899	1.77%
2012	69,940	33.21%	136,616	64.86%	4,065	1.93%
2016	75,698	38.07%	110,833	55.74%	12,299	6.19%
2020	81,763	40.66%	115,411	57.39%	3,933	1.96%
2024	82,398	42.81%	106,320	55.23%	3,771	1.96%

United States Senate election results for Lucas County, Ohio1
Year	Republican		Democratic		Third party(ies)	
Year	No.	%	No.	%	No.	%
2024	72,544	38.38%	107,783	57.02%	8,703	4.60%

== Government ==
=== County officials ===
Office	Name	Party
Commissioner	Lisa Sobecki	Democratic
Commissioner	Peter L. Gerken	Democratic
Commissioner	Anita L. Lopez	Democratic
Prosecutor	Julia R. Bates	Democratic
Sheriff	Mike Navarre	Democratic
Clerk of Courts	J. Bernie Quilter	Democratic
Recorder	Michael Ashford	Democratic
Treasurer	Lindsay Webb	Democratic
Engineer	Mike Pniewski	Democratic
Coroner	Tom Blomquist	Democratic
Auditor	Katie Moline	Democratic

== Communities ==
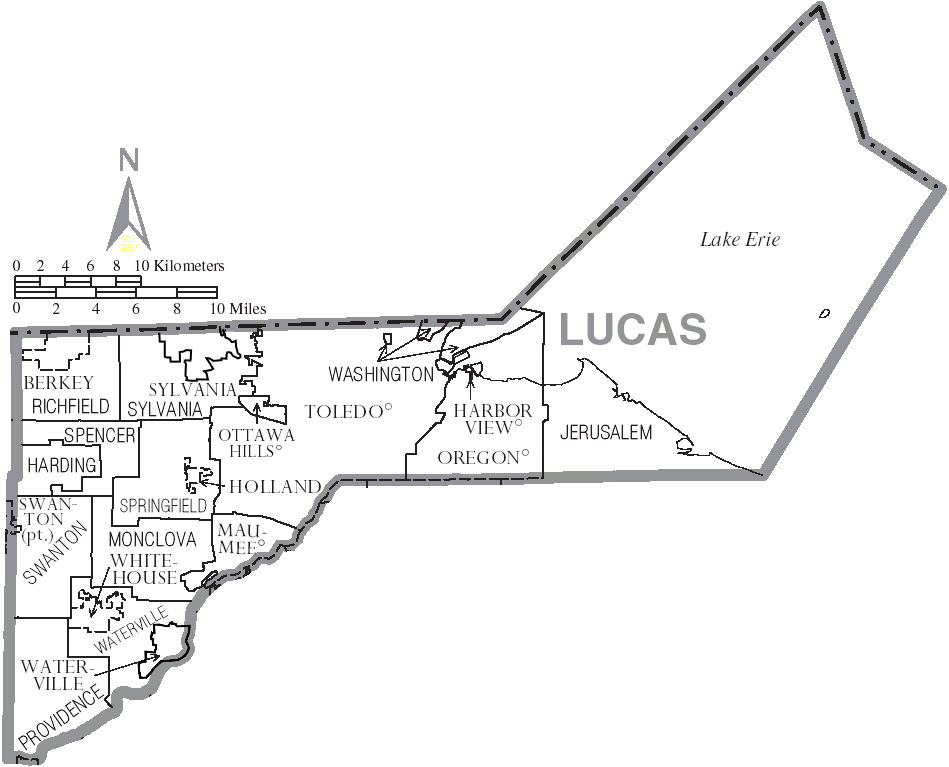
Map of Lucas County, Ohio with Municipal and Township labels

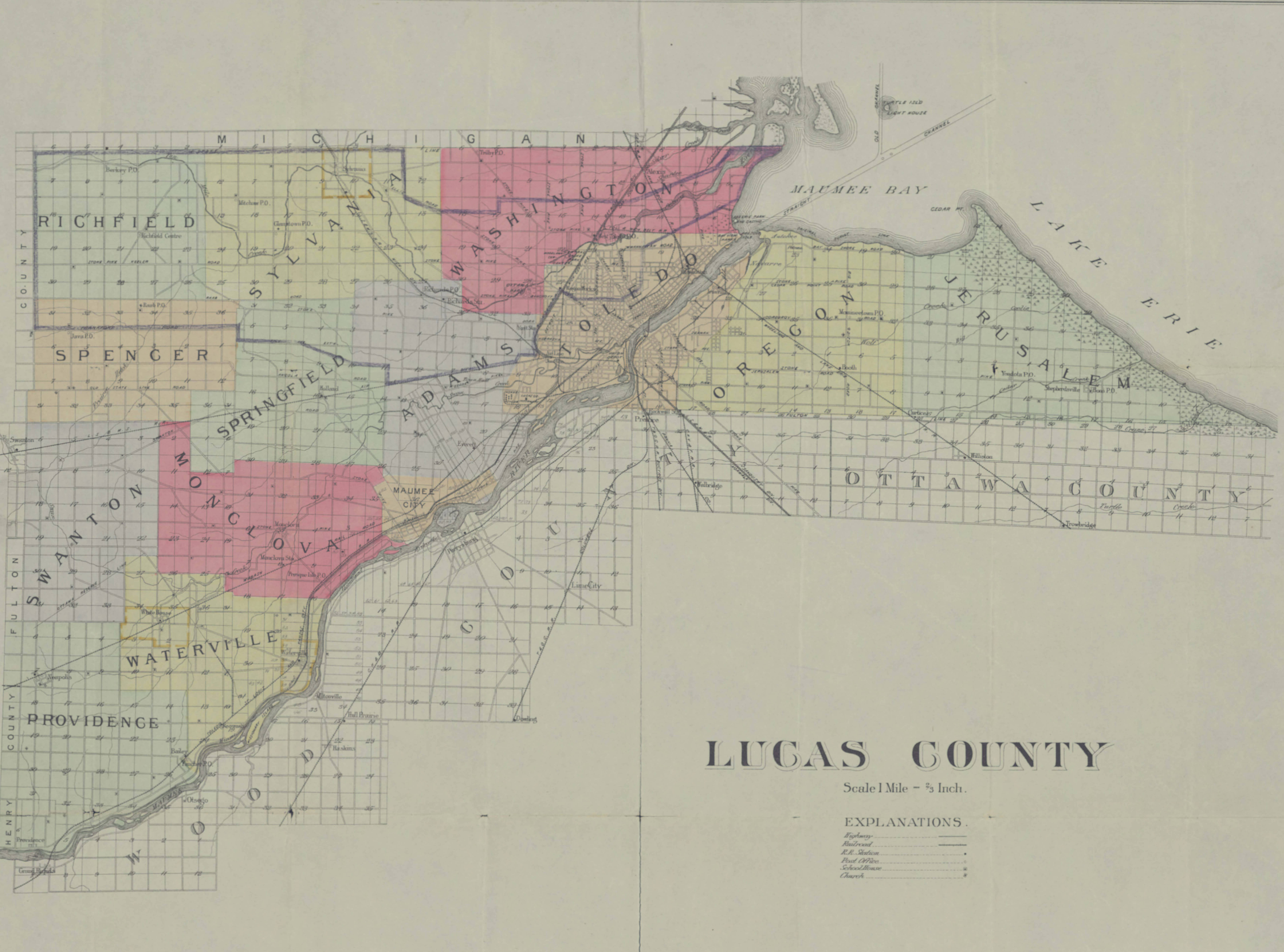
Historical map of Lucas County, 1899

=== Cities ===
- Maumee
- Oregon
- Sylvania
- Toledo (county seat)
- Waterville

=== Villages ===
- Berkey
- Harbor View
- Holland
- Ottawa Hills
- Swanton (mostly in Fulton County)
- Whitehouse

=== Townships ===
- Harding
- Jerusalem
- Monclova
- Providence
- Richfield
- Spencer
- Springfield
- Swanton
- Sylvania
- Washington
- Waterville

=== Census-designated places ===
- Curtice
- Neapolis
- Reno Beach

=== Unincorporated communities ===
- Bono
- Frankfort
- Monclova
- Providence
- Richfield Center
- Shoreland
- Yondota

=== Ghost towns ===
- Marengo
- Providence

== See also ==
- National Register of Historic Places listings in Lucas County, Ohio
- Parochial and technology Schools in Lucas County, Ohio
