= Providence Metropark =

Park in Ohio, United States

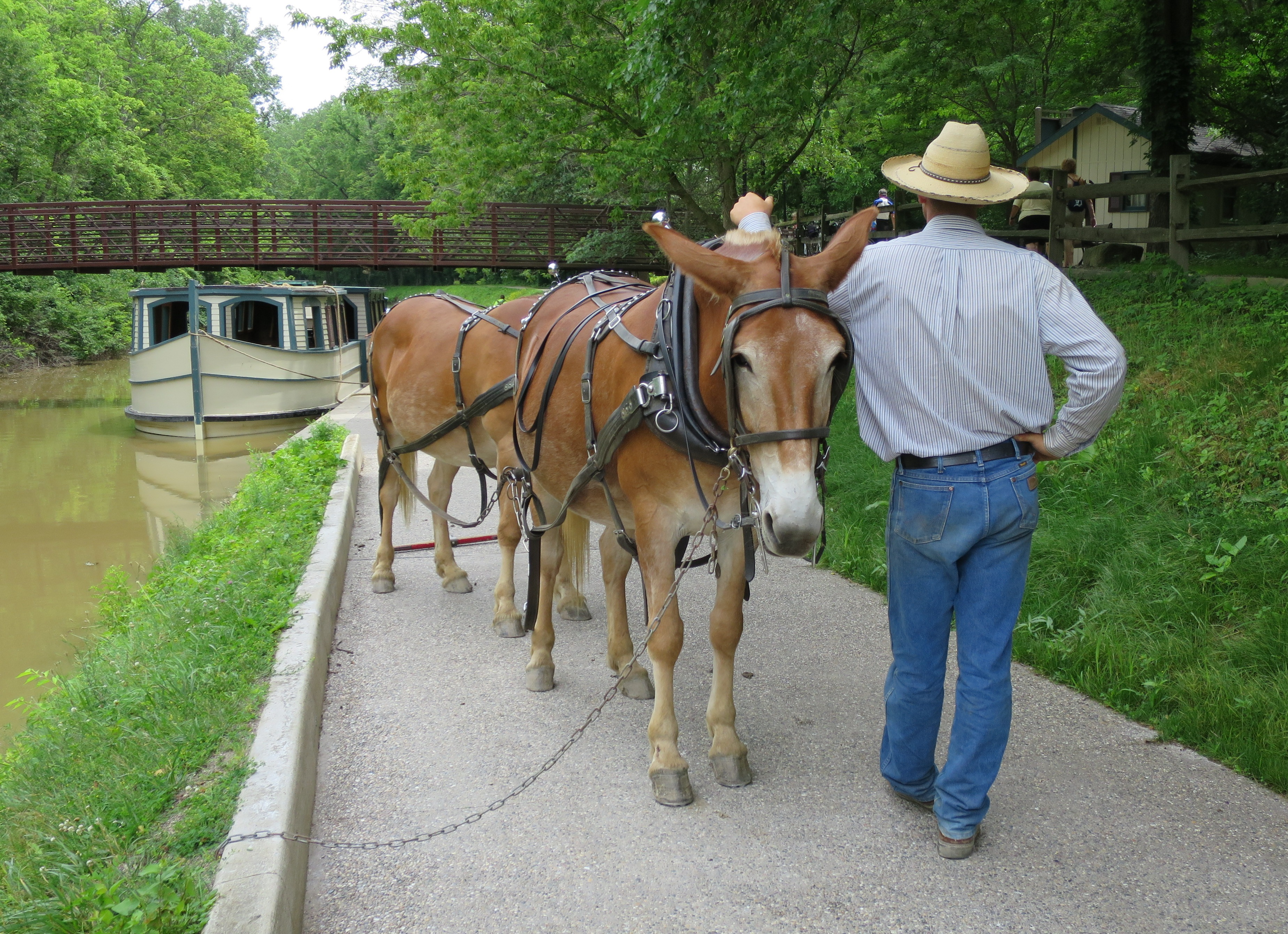
- Interactive map of Providence Metropark
- Type: Regional park
- Location: Grand Rapids, Ohio
- Coordinates: 41°24′57″N 83°51′31″W
- Created: 1930
- Operator: Metroparks Toledo
- Open: Year-round, 7 a.m. until dark daily

Providence Metropark is a regional park near Grand Rapids, Ohio, United States, owned and managed by Metroparks Toledo. The park contains mule-drawn canal boat rides on the Miami and Erie Canal and features canal lock 44, the only original functioning lock in the state of Ohio.

The park also contains the Isaac Ludwig Mill which was built in 1866 over a two-year period. The mill was originally a sawmill powered by a water wheel. It was converted to a grist mill driven by water turbines in the 1880s. Today, it functions as a living museum.

The park is connected by a walking trail to Bend View Metropark and Farnsworth Metropark.
