= Secor Metropark =

Regional park in Toledo, Ohio, United States

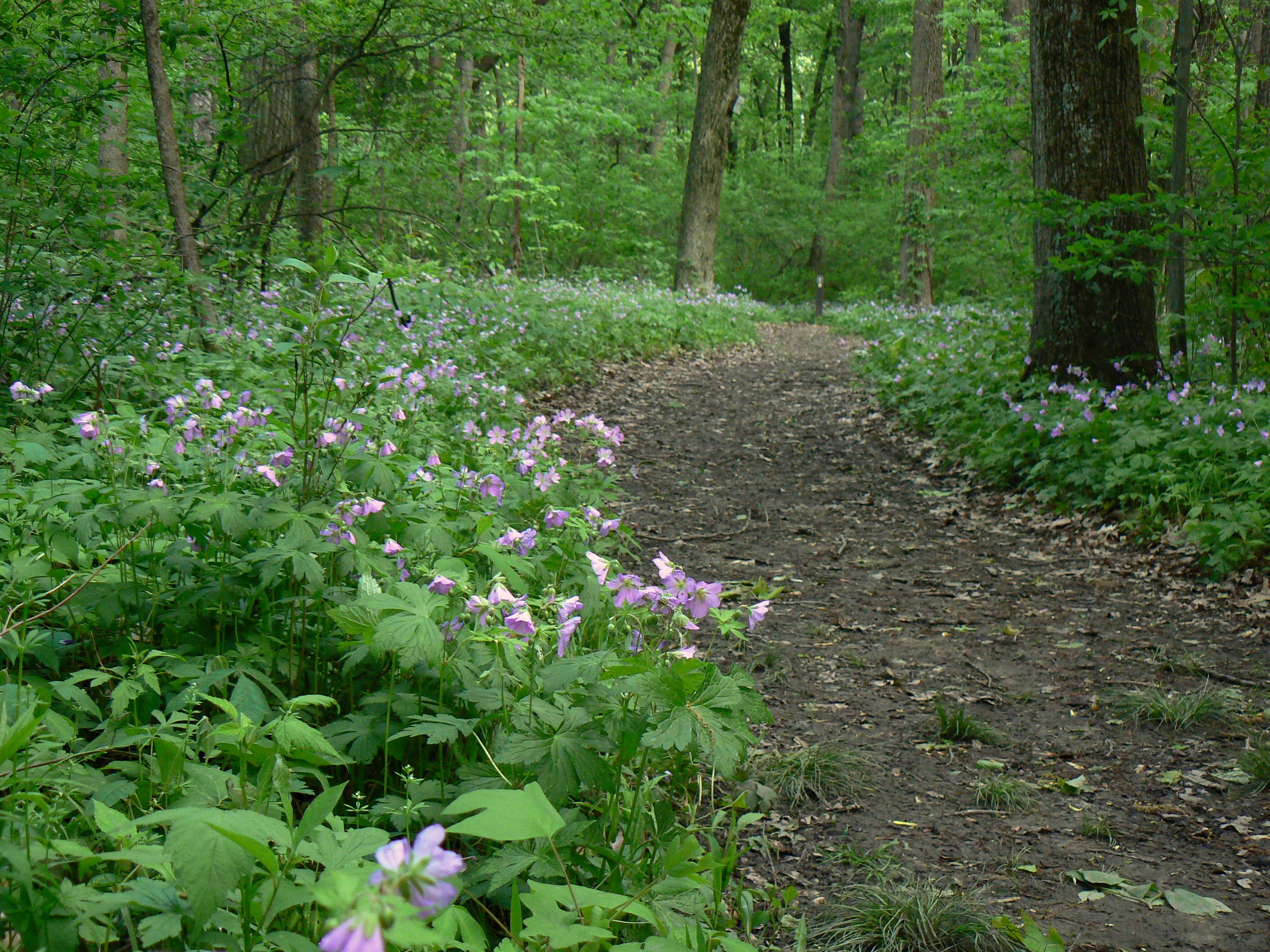
- A trail in Secor Metropark
- Interactive map of Secor Metropark
- Type: Regional park
- Location: Richfield Township and Sylvania Township, Ohio
- Coordinates: 41°40′02″N 83°47′20″W
- Area: 837 acres (339 ha)
- Created: 1949
- Operator: Metroparks Toledo
- Open: Year-round, 7 a.m. until dark daily

Secor Metropark is a regional park in Richfield Township and Sylvania Township, Ohio, owned and managed by Metroparks Toledo. The park is in the Oak Openings Region.

== Features ==
The park holds the most dogwoods of anywhere in Northwest Ohio, and most of Secor's tree trunks are buttressed—have extra wide bases—in order to remain stable in the park's swampy soil.

Wolfinger Cemetery, a burial site of Richfield Township's first settlers, is also held inside the park's boundaries.

The park is the former home of the National Center for Nature Photography.
