= Farnsworth Metropark =

Regional park in Waterville, Ohio

Coordinates: 41°29′15″N 83°43′54″W

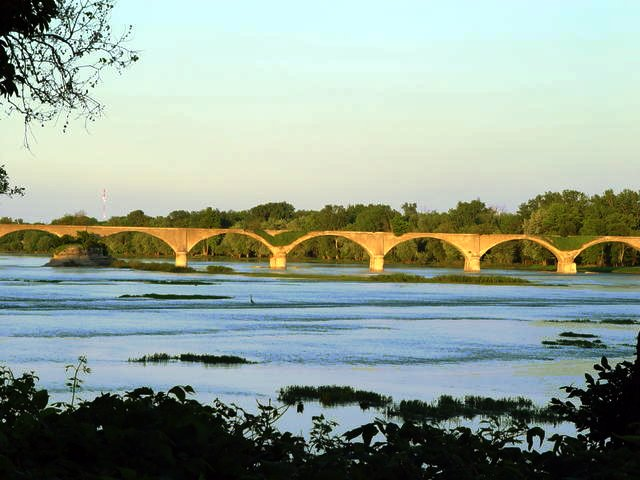
- Interurban Bridge and Roche de Bout from Farnsworth Metropark
- Interactive map of Farnsworth Metropark
- Type: Regional park
- Location: Waterville, Ohio
- Created: 1935
- Operator: Metroparks Toledo
- Open: Year-round, 7 a.m. until dark daily

Farnsworth Metropark is a regional park in Waterville, Ohio, owned and operated by Metroparks Toledo. The long narrow parks sits on the western shore of the Maumee River with a view of several islands, including Missionary, Butler and Indian islands, all of which are owned by the State of Ohio.

== Geological features ==
=== Roche de Bout ===
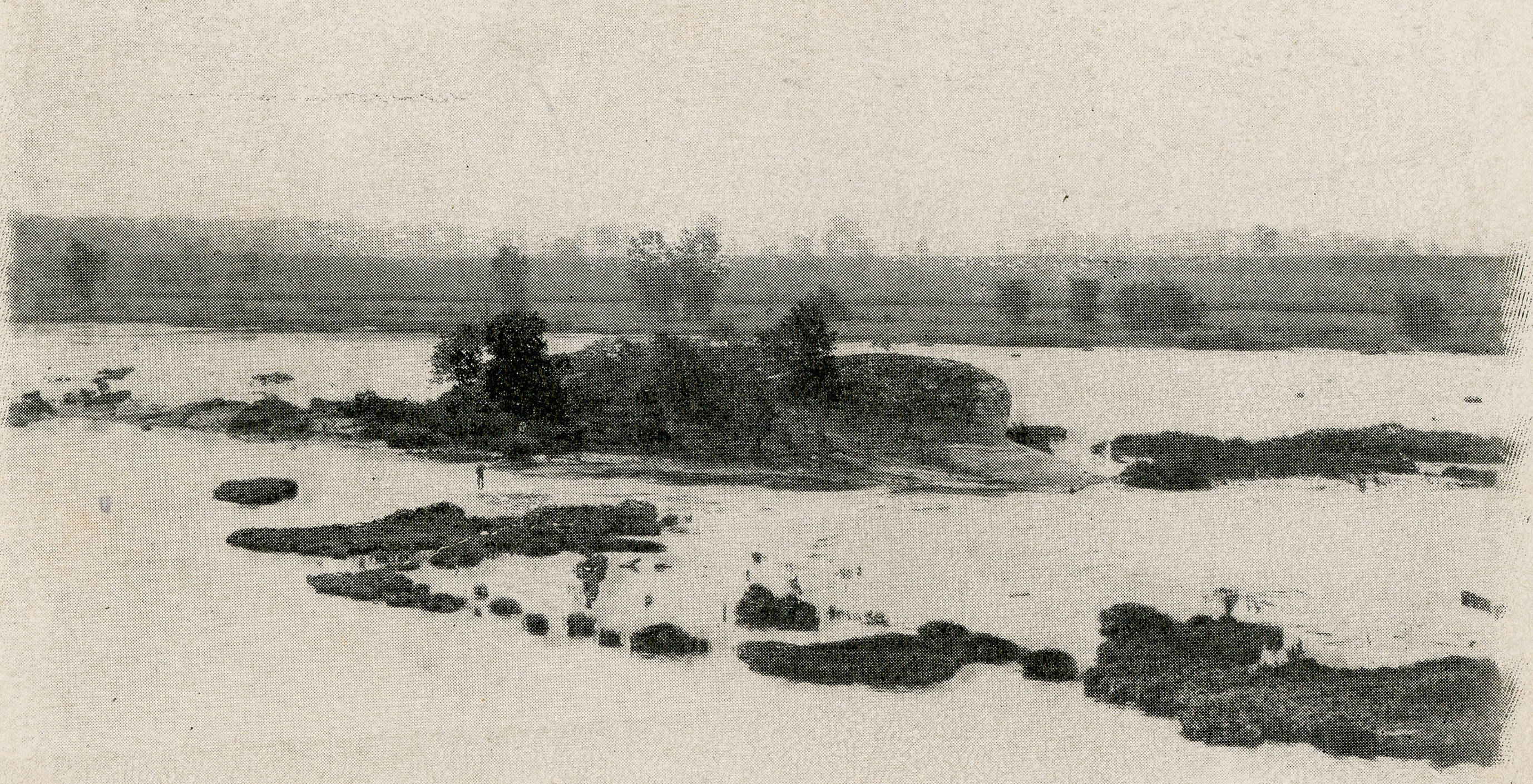
Early 20th century view of Roche de Boeuf

The Roche de Bout or Roche de Boeuf (French for "rock of beef" or "buffalo rock") is a big limestone outcrop which forms an island near the center of the Maumee River. It was a landmark for early explorers and natives. The landmark was used by the Miami, Shawnee, Lenape and their allies as a location for councils. Leaders of these tribes met there before the Battle of Fallen Timbers with General Anthony Wayne in 1794, which was a pivotal battle for the settlement of the Northwest Territory. Aug. 19, 1794, Wayne built a fort on the bank of the river opposite the rock, named Fort Deposit, because it was a storage depot for ammo and supplies. The fort was abandoned after Wayne bivouacked the wounded there and returned to Fort Defiance.

It was used as one of the supports for the now abandoned Interurban Bridge. At one time, the Interurban Bridge, which crosses the river at the park, was the largest bridge that was filled with earth and reinforced by concrete. Today the bridge, which formerly served as part of an interurban rail line, is in ruins.

In 2001, the rock and bridge an Ohio Historical Society Bicentennial Marker was dedicated to them for their historical significance. Visitors to Farnsworth Metropark can easily wade to through the Maumee River out to the Roche de Bout.

=== Bowling Green Fault ===
The Bowling Green Fault, which goes directly through the park, is the only fault line around the Great Lakes. Running from Findlay, Ohio to Michigan, it is 100 miles (160 km) long fault. When the Maumee water line is very low, the fault is exposed.
