= Bend View Metropark =

Park in Waterville, Ohio, United States

- Interactive map of Bend View Metropark
- Type: Regional park
- Location: Waterville, Ohio
- Coordinates: 41°27′09″N 83°46′52″W
- Created: 1935
- Operator: Metroparks Toledo
- Open: Year-round, 7 a.m. until dark daily

Bend View Metropark is a regional park located in Waterville, Ohio, owned and managed by Metroparks Toledo and named for its view of a 90-degree bend in the Maumee River.
