= Swan Creek Preserve Metropark =

Park in Toledo, Ohio, United States

Coordinates: 41.616926°N 83.63924°W

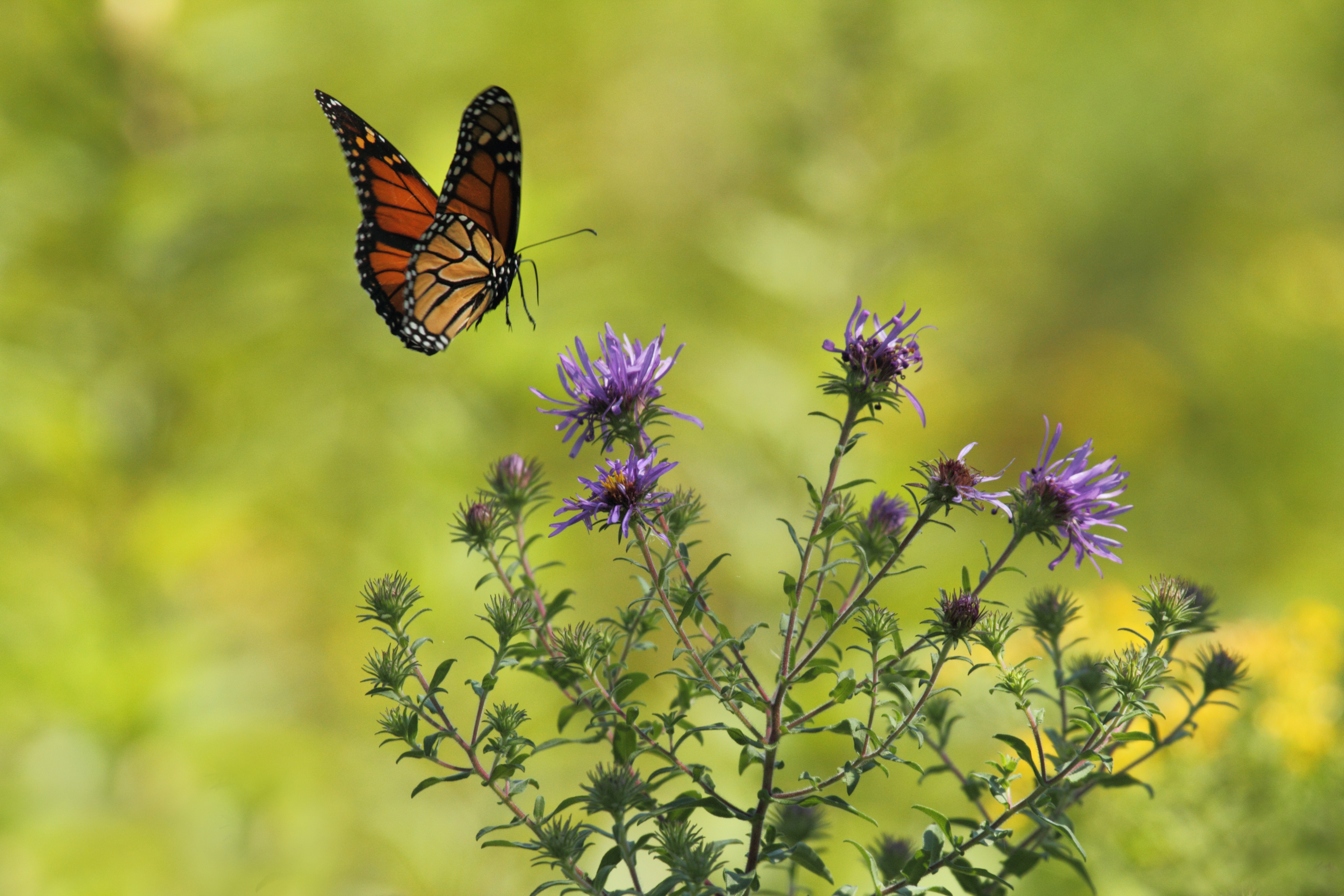
- A monarch butterfly in Swan Creek Preserve Metropark
- Interactive map of Swan Creek Preserve Metropark
- Type: Regional park
- Location: Toledo, Ohio
- Area: 451 acres (183 ha)
- Created: 1963
- Operator: Metroparks Toledo
- Open: Year-round, 7 a.m. until dark daily

Swan Creek Preserve Metropark is a regional park in Toledo, Ohio, owned and managed by Metroparks Toledo. The park contains several miles of often used trails.
