= Pearson Metropark =

Park in Ohio, United States

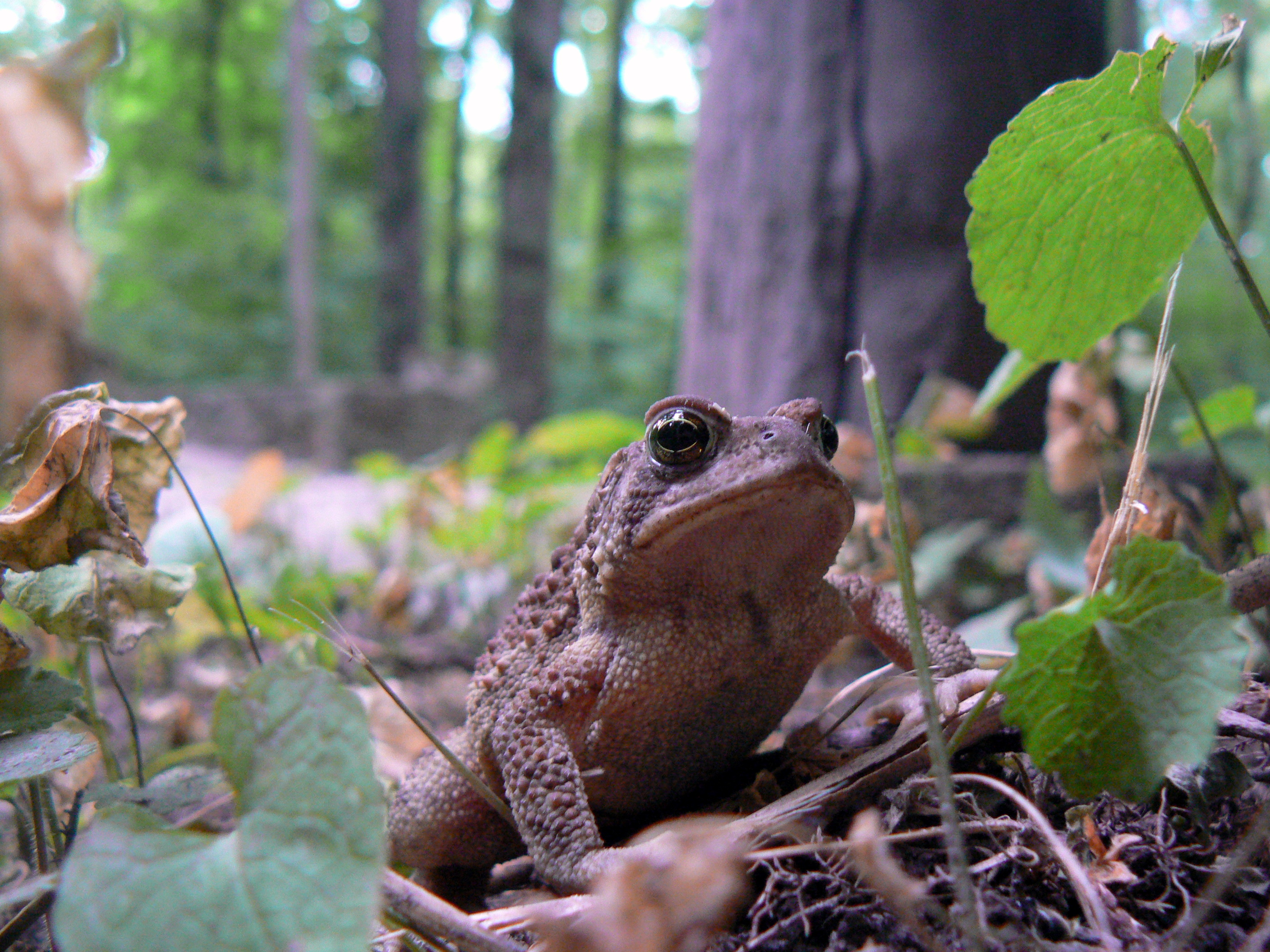
- A frog in the Metropark.
- Interactive map of Pearson Metropark
- Type: Regional park
- Location: Oregon, Ohio
- Coordinates: 41°38′30″N 83°26′17″W
- Area: 627 acres (254 ha)
- Created: 1934
- Operator: Metroparks Toledo
- Open: Year-round, 7 a.m. until dark daily

Pearson Metropark is a regional park in Oregon, Ohio, owned and managed by Metroparks Toledo. It is one of the few remnants left of the Great Black Swamp. The park contains old-growth forest and wetlands. The park contains a pond in the summer months and sledding in the winter months.

Pearson Metropark hosts an annual waterfowl festival.
