= Side Cut Metropark =

Park in Maumee, Ohio, United States

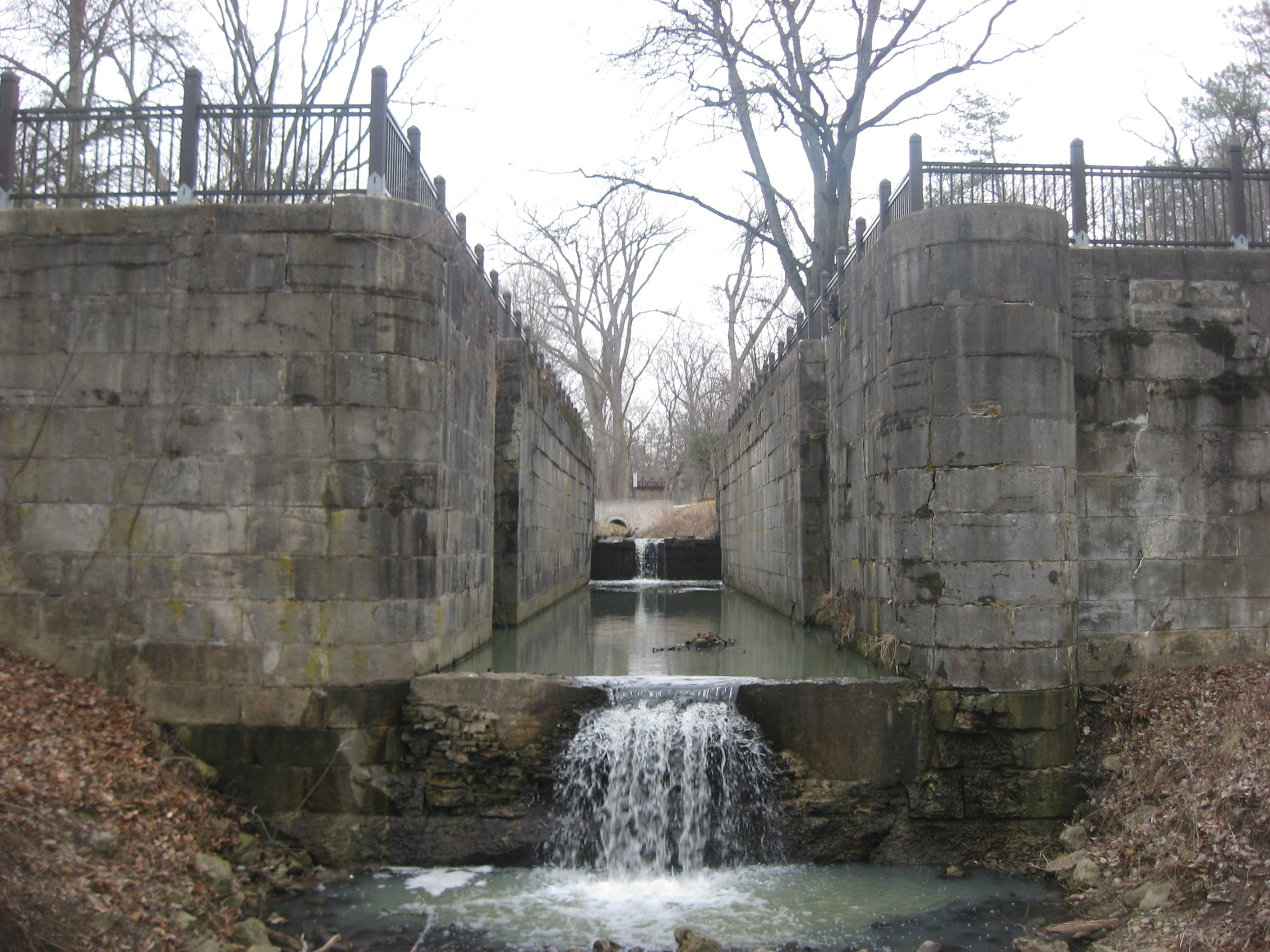
- Canal locks #3 and #4
- Interactive map of Side Cut Metropark
- Type: Regional park
- Location: Maumee, Ohio
- Coordinates: 41°33′18″N 83°40′22″W
- Area: 323 acres (131 ha)
- Created: 1930
- Operator: Metroparks Toledo
- Open: Year-round, 7 a.m. until dark daily
- Maumee Sidecut
- U.S. National Register of Historic Places
- Location: N of Maumee River, SW of Ewing Island, Maumee, Ohio
- Area: 9 acres (3.6 ha)
- Built: 1842
- NRHP reference No.: 73001500
- Added to NRHP: April 11, 1973

Side Cut Metropark is a regional park in Maumee, Ohio, owned and managed by Metroparks Toledo and named for being a sidecut on the Miami and Erie Canal. The sidecut was built over an 18-year period in the nineteenth century and completed in 1842, opening to boat traffic the following year. It closed in 1850 after being bypassed by an extension of the main canal. It was listed on the National Register of Historic Places in 1973.

It features Bluegrass Island, a popular fishing destination. Obtained from the state of Ohio in the 1920s, Side Cut was the original metropark.
