= Metroparks Toledo =

Park district in and around Toledo, Ohio, United States

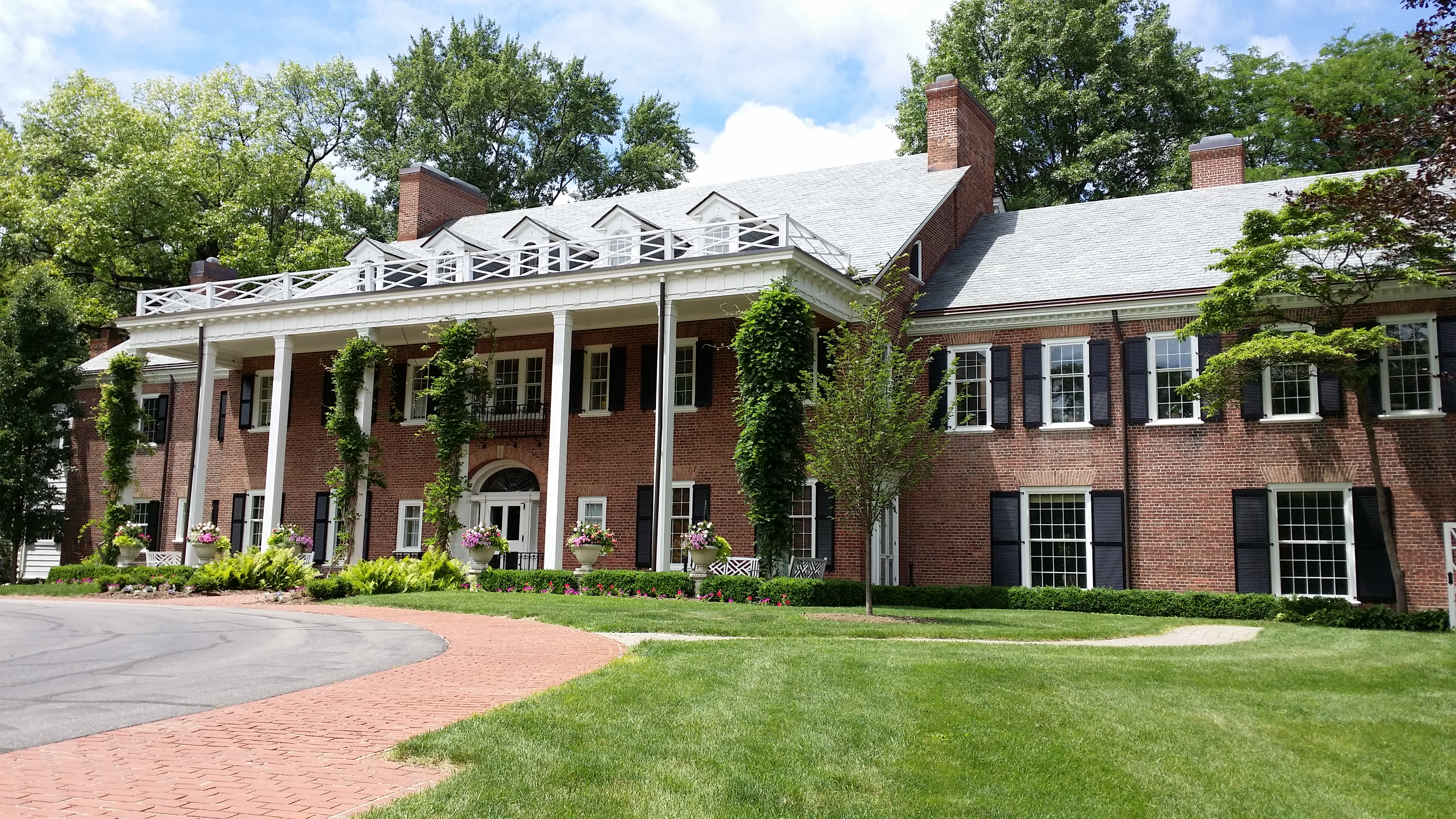
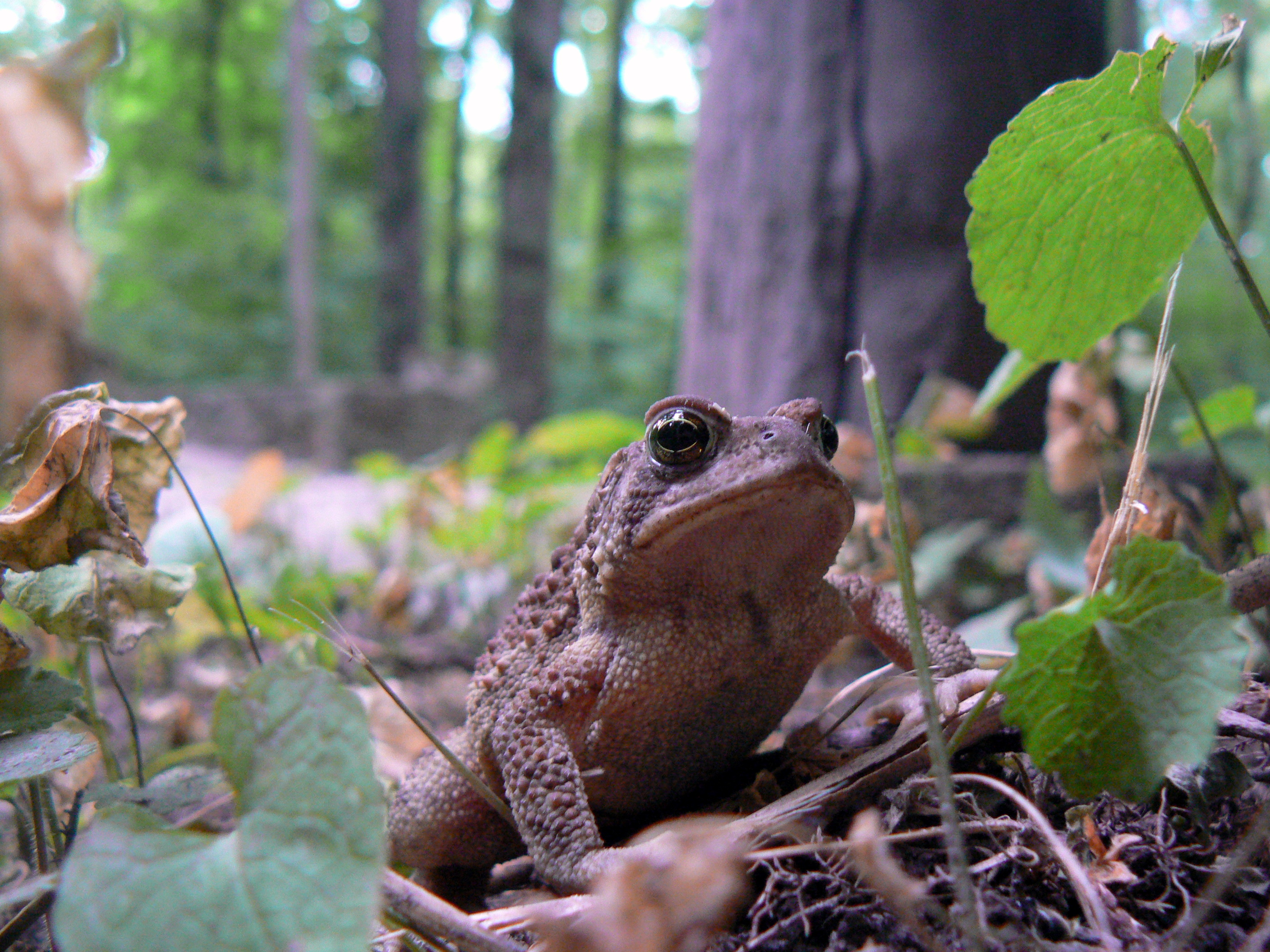
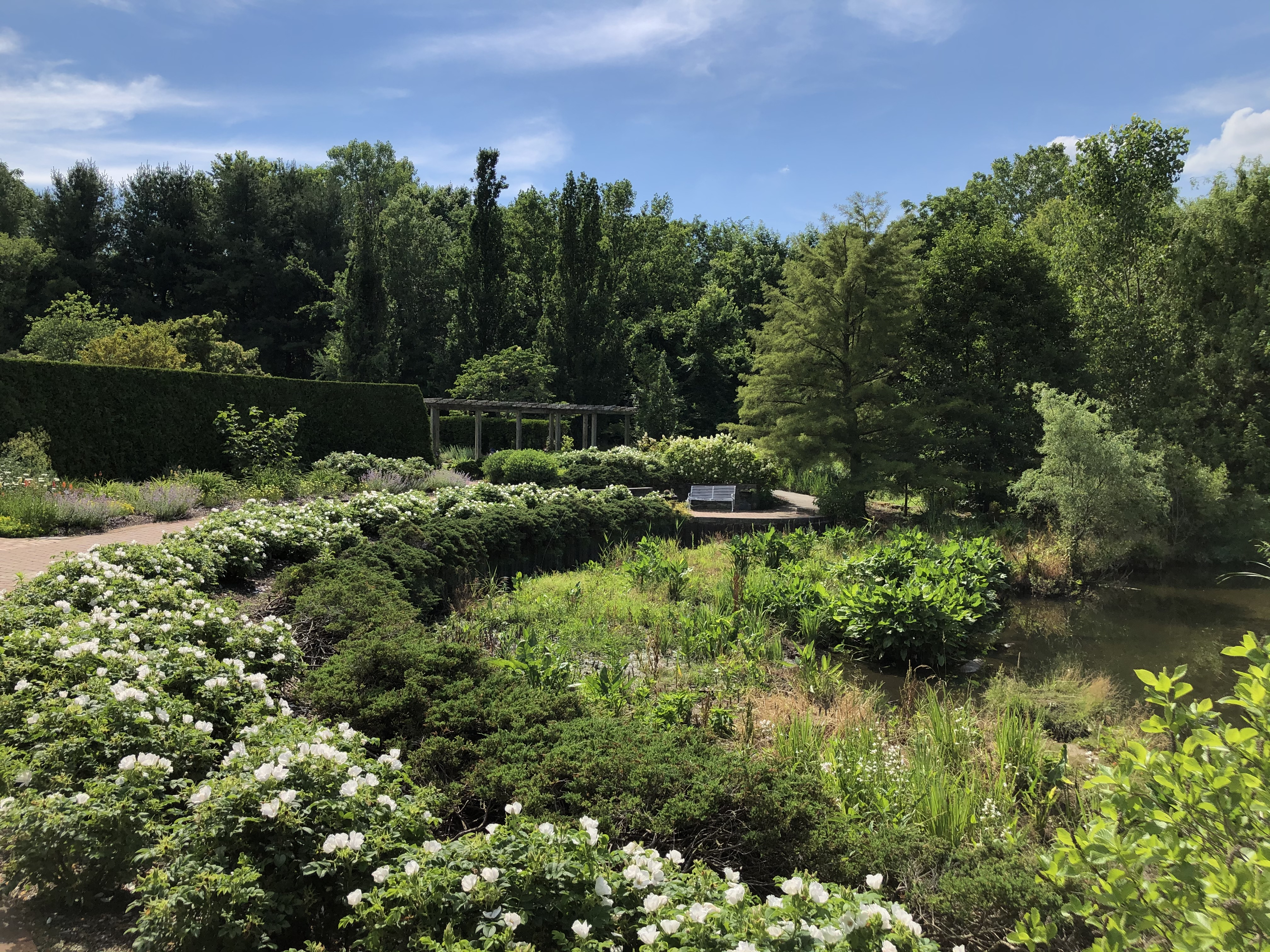
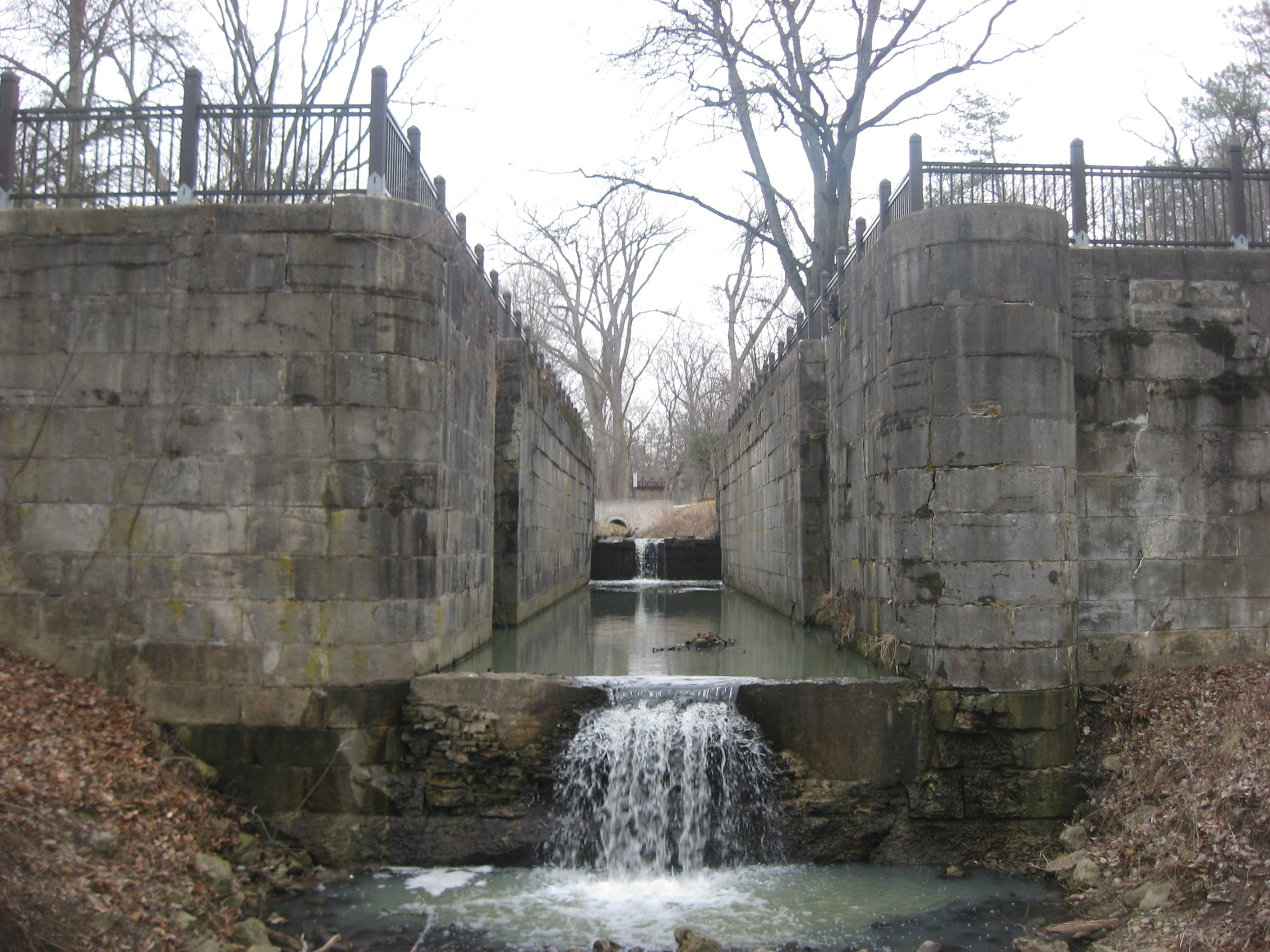
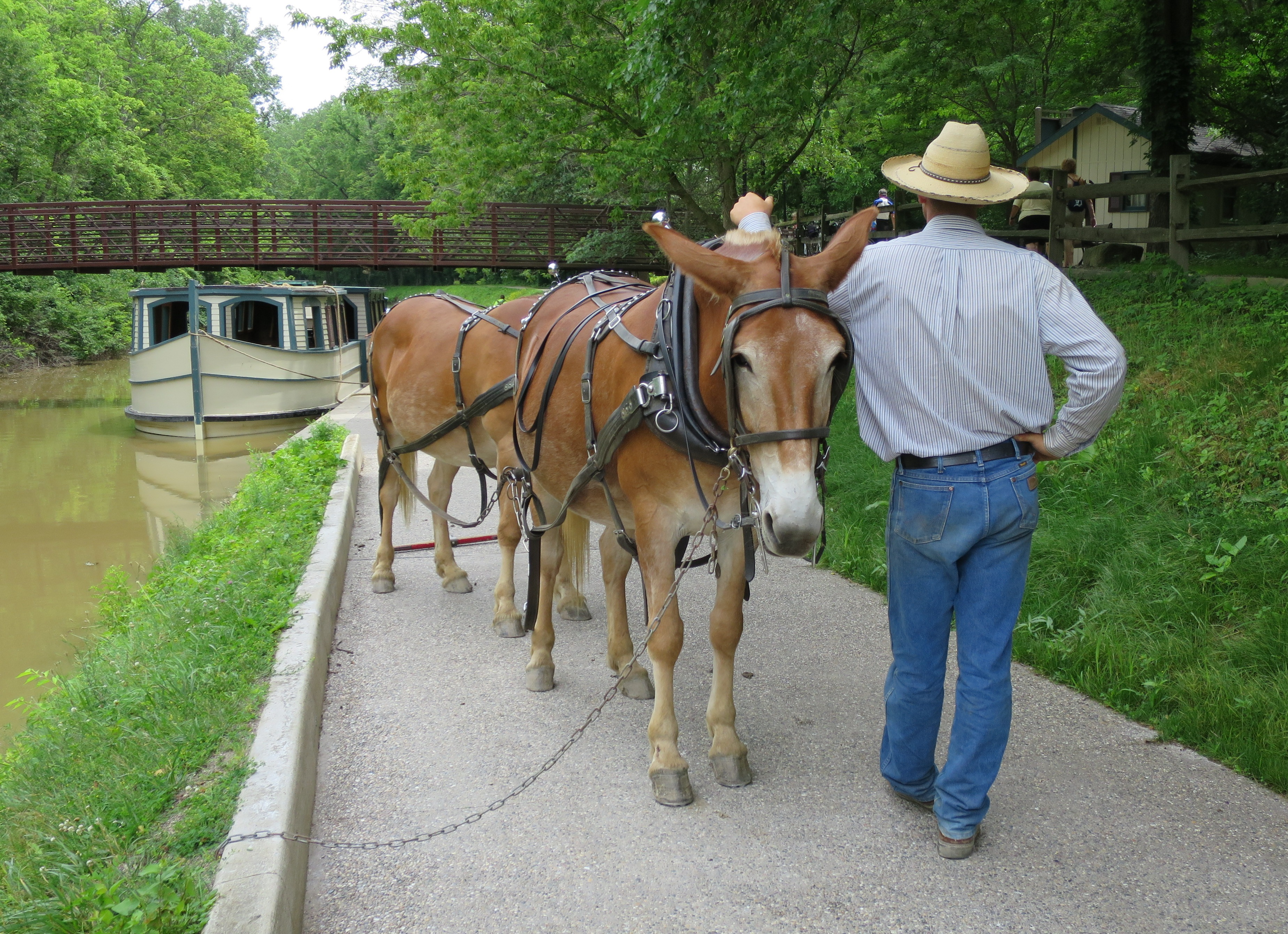
- Clockwise from top: Wildwood Preserve Metropark's Manor House, the Toledo Botanical Garden, a canal boat and mule team at Providence Metropark, canal locks at Side Cut Metropark, wildlife in Pearson Metropark.
- Type: Public park district
- Motto: Get Outside Yourself
- Location: Lucas County, Ohio, United States
- Area: 12,700 acres (5,100 ha)
- Created: 1928
- Operator: Board of Park Commissioners of the Metropolitan Park District of the Toledo Area
- Visitors: 6 million (2021)
- Open: Year-round, 7 a.m. until dark daily
- Budget: $20.4 million (2022)
- Website: metroparkstoledo.com

Metroparks Toledo, officially the Metropolitan Park District of the Toledo Area, is a public park district consisting of parks, nature preserves, a botanical garden, trail network and historic battlefield in Lucas County, Ohio.

Founded during the Great Depression and initially built using labor from federal New Deal programs, the present park district includes 12,700 acres (5,100 ha) across 19 metroparks and nearly 200 miles (320 km) of trails throughout the Toledo area.

The largest park, Oak Openings Preserve Metropark, is a centerpiece of the Oak Openings Region and features ecologically significant oak savanna landscapes and globally rare plant communities. Pearson Metropark contains one of the last remaining stands of the Great Black Swamp.

The district includes historically and culturally significant sites, including the Fallen Timbers Battlefield, surviving Miami and Erie Canal infrastructure at Side Cut and Providence Metroparks, and a variety of shelters and buildings built by the federal Works Progress Administration and Civilian Conservation Corps. Wildwood Preserve Metropark features one of the last remaining public, free-admission gardens designed by Ellen Biddle Shipman at the former manor house estate of Champion spark plug magnate Robert Stranahan.

== Governance ==
Metroparks Toledo is governed by a five-member volunteer board of commissioners appointed by the Lucas County probate court judge. The park district administrative offices are located at Wildwood Preserve Metropark.

The system is funded by three tax levies, the state local government fund, grants and donations. In 2022, the district employed 164 full-time and part-time employees.

== Metroparks ==
The district comprises 19 metroparks. Two additional properties, Fort Miamis in Maumee and the Brookwood Area in Toledo, are part of the district, but are not defined as metroparks.

Metropark	Acreage (Hectares)	Location	Year Est.	Park Map
Bend View Metropark	461 acres (187 ha) combined	Waterville	1935	map
Farnsworth Metropark	461 acres (187 ha) combined	Waterville	1937	map
Providence Metropark	461 acres (187 ha) combined	Providence Township	1930	map
Blue Creek Metropark	678 acres (274 ha)	Whitehouse and Waterville Township	2000	map
Cannonball Prairie Metropark	89 acres (36 ha)	Monclova Township	2020	map
Fallen Timbers Battlefield Metropark	204 acres (83 ha)	Maumee and Monclova Township	2000 (land purchased); 2015 (battlefield opened)	map
Glass City Metropark	66 acres (27 ha)	Toledo	2020	map
Howard Marsh Metropark	995 acres (403 ha)	Jerusalem Township	2018	map
Manhattan Marsh Preserve Metropark	57 acres (23 ha)	Toledo	2020	map
Middlegrounds Metropark	28 acres (11 ha)	Toledo	2016	map
Oak Openings Preserve Metropark	4,291 acres (1,737 ha)	Swanton Township	1931	map
Pearson Metropark	627 acres (254 ha)	Oregon	1934	map
Secor Metropark	837 acres (339 ha)	Richfield Township and Sylvania Township	1949	map
Side Cut Metropark	323 acres (131 ha)	Maumee	1930	map
Swan Creek Preserve Metropark	451 acres (183 ha)	Toledo	1963	map
Toledo Botanical Garden	60 acres (24 ha)	Toledo	1964	map
Westwinds Metropark	174 acres (70 ha)	Springfield Township	2015	map
Wildwood Preserve Metropark	493 acres (200 ha)	Sylvania Township	1975	map
Wiregrass Lake Metropark	51 acres (21 ha)	Spencer Township	2015	map

== Land holdings ==
Metroparks Toledo owns 167 acres (68 ha) of farmland in Toledo near Inverness Club for future development as a metropark. Metroparks officials said the future park will be the "typical Metroparks experience" with meadows and a sledding hill.

The district additionally owns approximately 1,900 acres (770 ha), called the Oak Openings Corridor, in western Lucas County and Swan Creek Township, Fulton County.

Four Maumee River islands (Marengo, Audubon, Blue Grass and Granger) totaling 257 acres (104 ha) are owned by Metroparks Toledo. Granger Island features a private cabin available for rent.

== Regional trails ==
Metroparks Toledo manages all or portions of several paved, regional rail trails.

Trail	Length (one-way)	Location	Former railroad	Notes
University/Parks Trail	7 miles (11 km)	University of Toledo to Sylvania Township	Toledo, Angola and Western Railroad	Owned by Lucas County and maintained by Metroparks, University of Toledo and City of Toledo.
Wabash Cannonball Trail - North Fork	46 miles (74 km); about 9.5 miles (15.3 km) in Lucas County	Maumee to Montpelier	Wabash Railroad	Owned and managed in Lucas County by Metroparks.
Wabash Cannonball Trail - South Fork	17 miles (27 km); about 10 miles (16 km) in Lucas County	Maumee to Liberty Center	Wabash Railroad	Owned and managed in Lucas County by Metroparks.
Chessie Circle Trail	11 miles (18 km) total; 1.4 miles (2.3 km) owned by Metroparks in South Toledo	Perrysburg to Bowman Park, Toledo.	Toledo Terminal Railroad	
