= Toledo Botanical Garden =

Botanical garden in Toledo, Ohio, United States

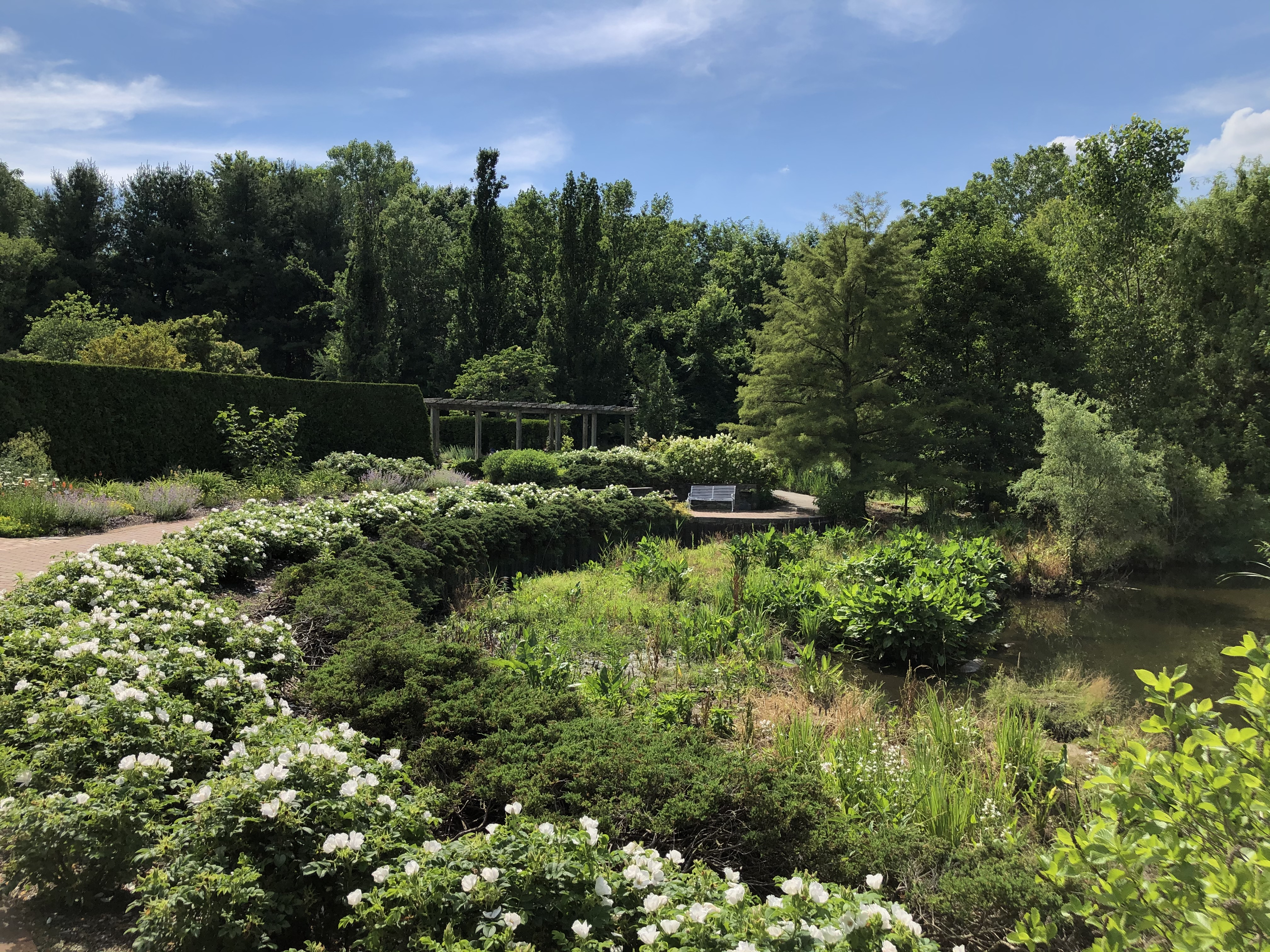
- Interactive map of Toledo Botanical Garden
- Type: Botanical garden
- Location: Toledo, Ohio
- Coordinates: 41°40′05″N 83°40′20″W
- Area: 60 acres (24 ha)
- Created: 1964
- Operator: Metroparks Toledo
- Open: Year-round, 7 a.m. until dark daily
- Website: Official website

Toledo Botanical Garden (formerly the Crosby Gardens and George P. Crosby Park) is a botanical garden in Toledo, Ohio, owned and managed by Metroparks Toledo.

Originally comprising 20 acres (8.1 ha) donated by George P. Crosby to the City of Toledo, the garden now encompasses 60 acres (24 ha). Notable events include the Crosby Festival of the Arts, held in late June; and Heralding the Holidays, a seasonal celebration showcasing the numerous resident artistic guilds.

== History ==
Metroparks Toledo began assisting operations in 2006 after the city ceased its funding of the garden. Transfer of the park to Metroparks Toledo was formally transferred in 2019.

== Notable gardens ==
- Susan H. LeCron Shade Garden (Including a noteworthy Hosta collection)
- Pioneer garden
- Herb garden
- Rose garden
- Perennial garden
- Green garden

== Blair Lithophane Museum ==
In 2002 a collection of 2,300 Lithophanes that had been donated to the city of Toledo were used to establish a museum at the Toledo Botanical Gardens. The museum closed at the end of October 2019. The city agreed to relocate the museum by September 2020. As of January 2020, the museum had not confirmed future plans, beyond attempting to keep the collection in the city of Toledo.

== Gallery ==
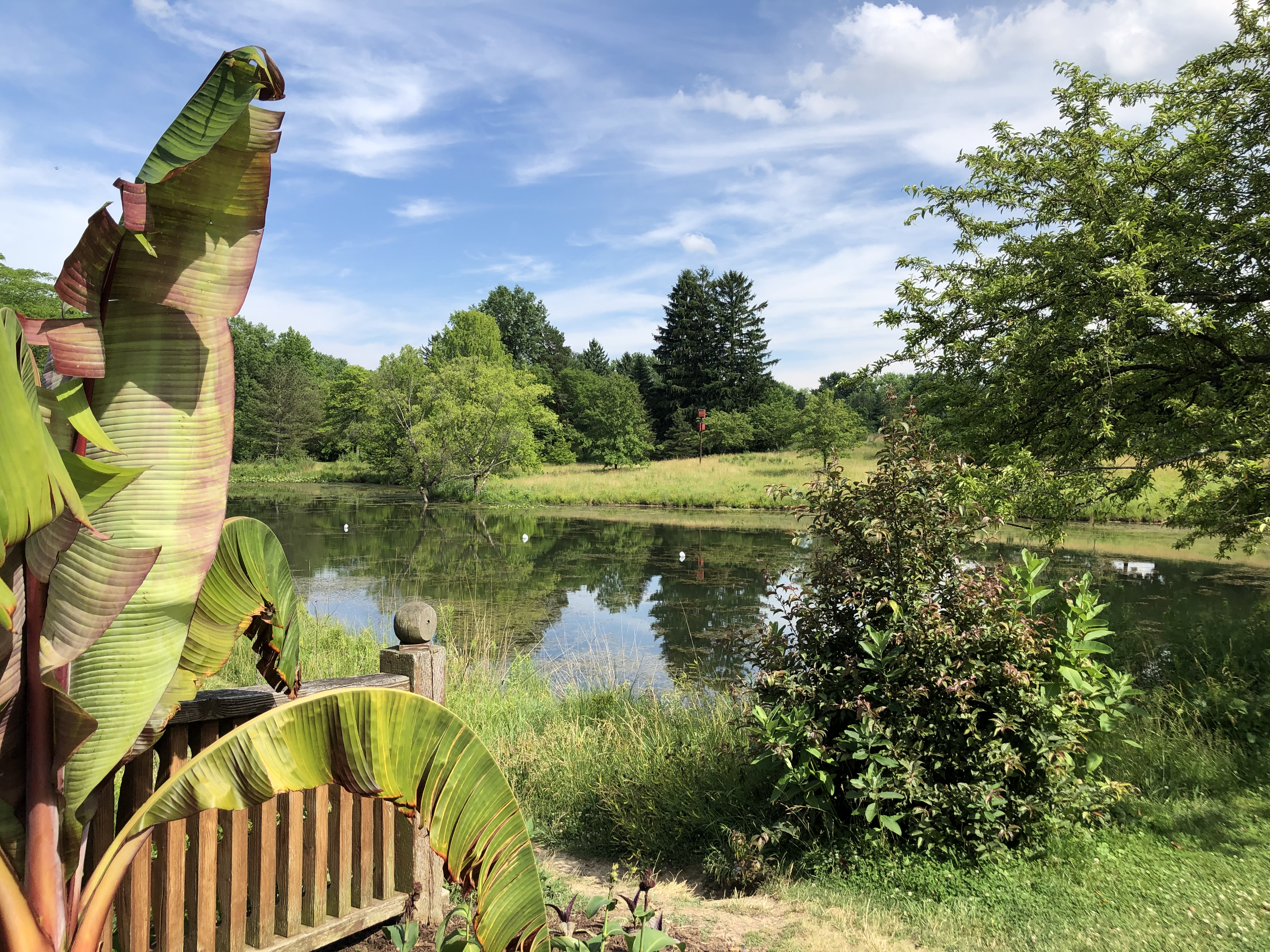
Pond at the Botanical Garden

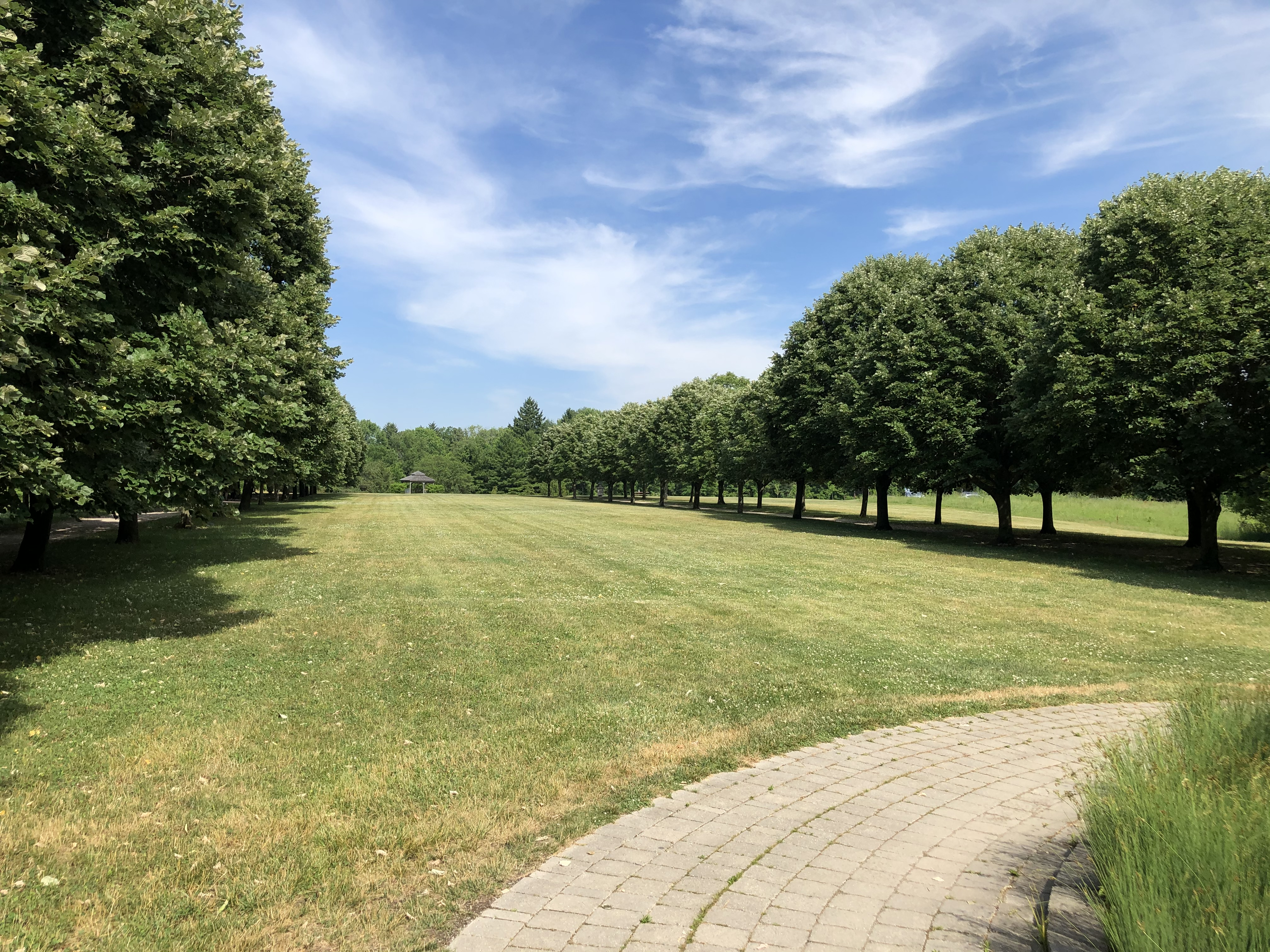
Tree lined promenade

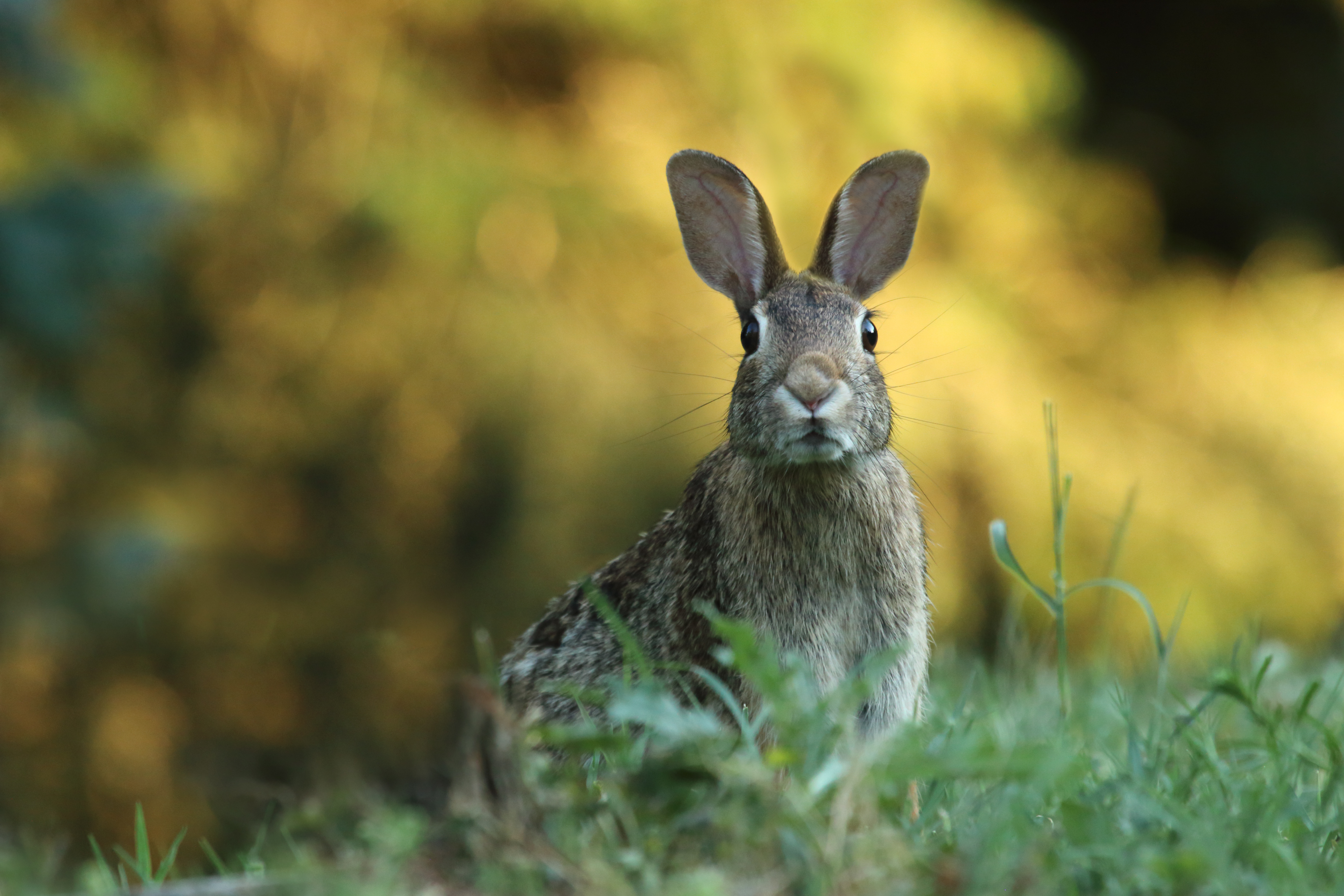
Rabbit spotted in one of the grassy areas.

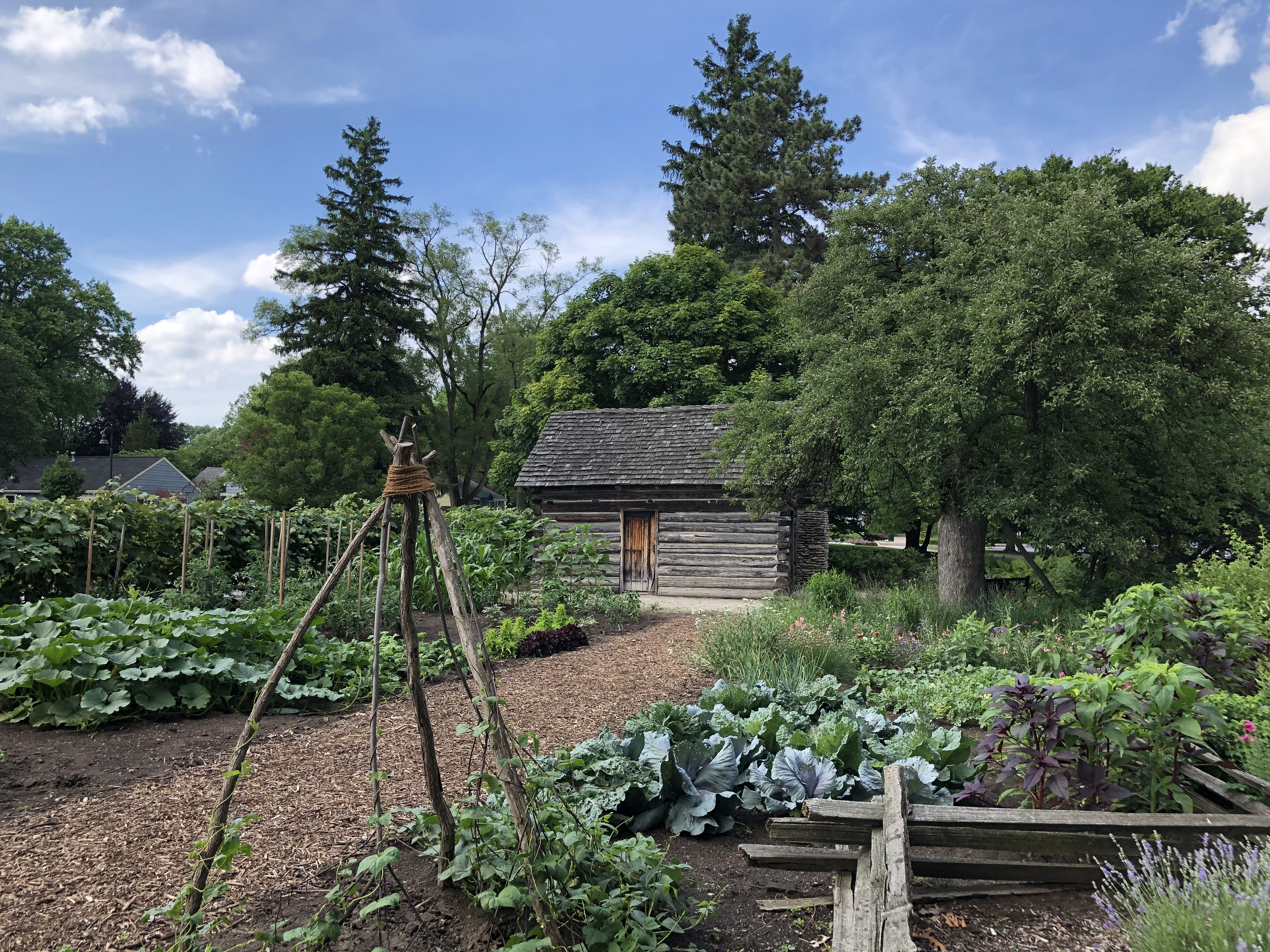
Peter Navarre Cabin & Garden

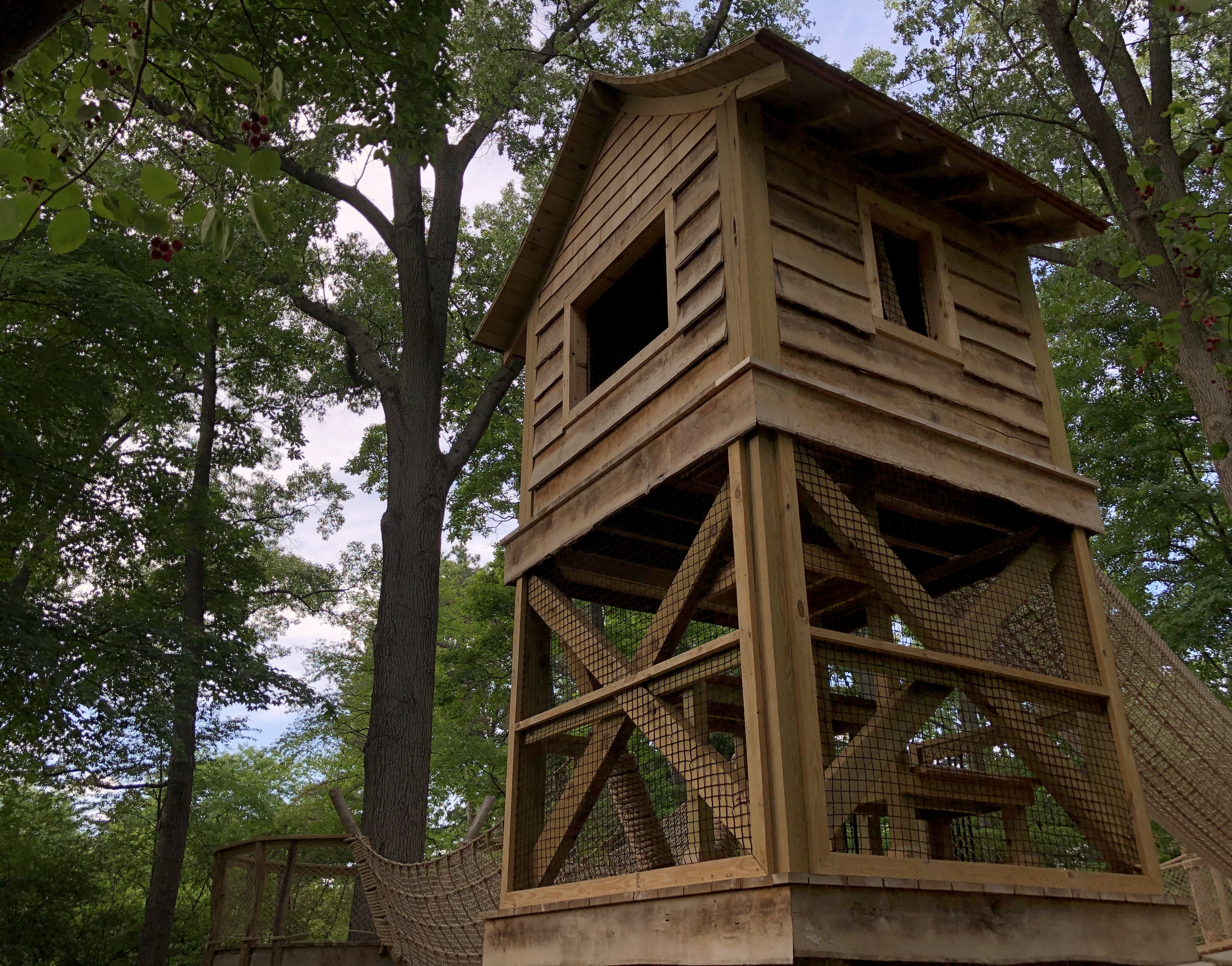
The Secret Forest Playground

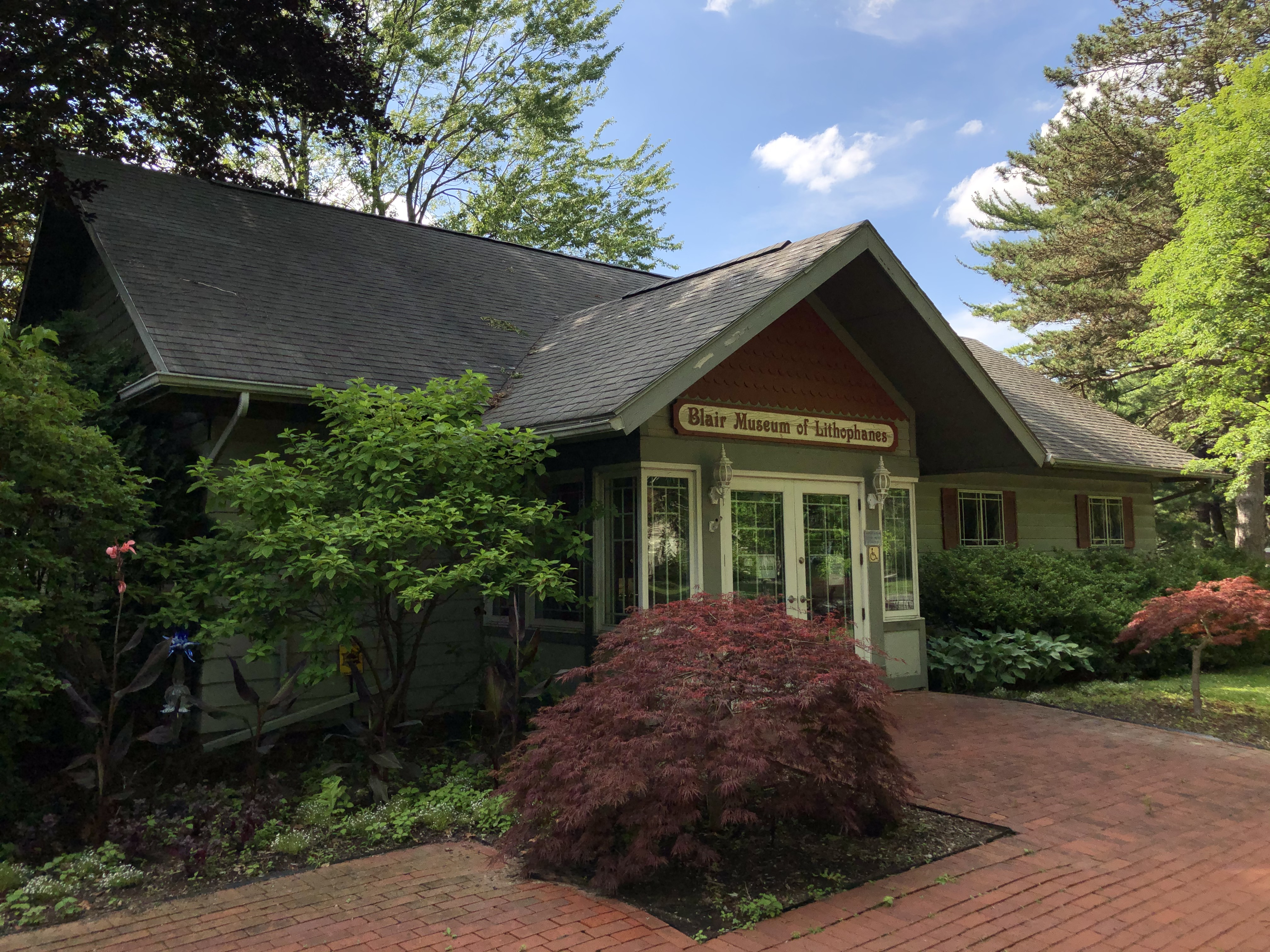
The Blair Museum of Lithoplanes at the Toledo Botanical Garden

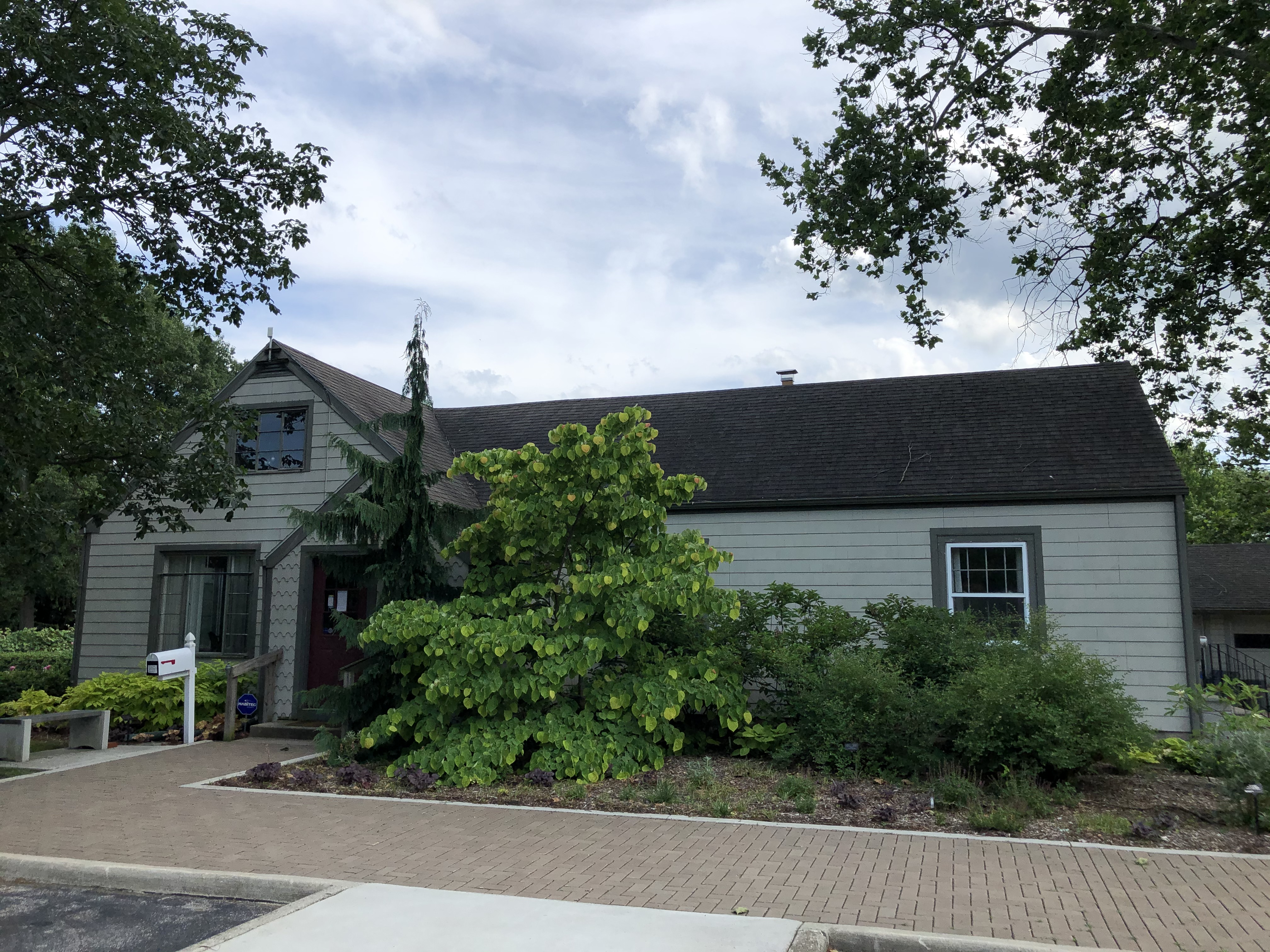
Ohio State University Branch office at the Toledo Botanical Garden

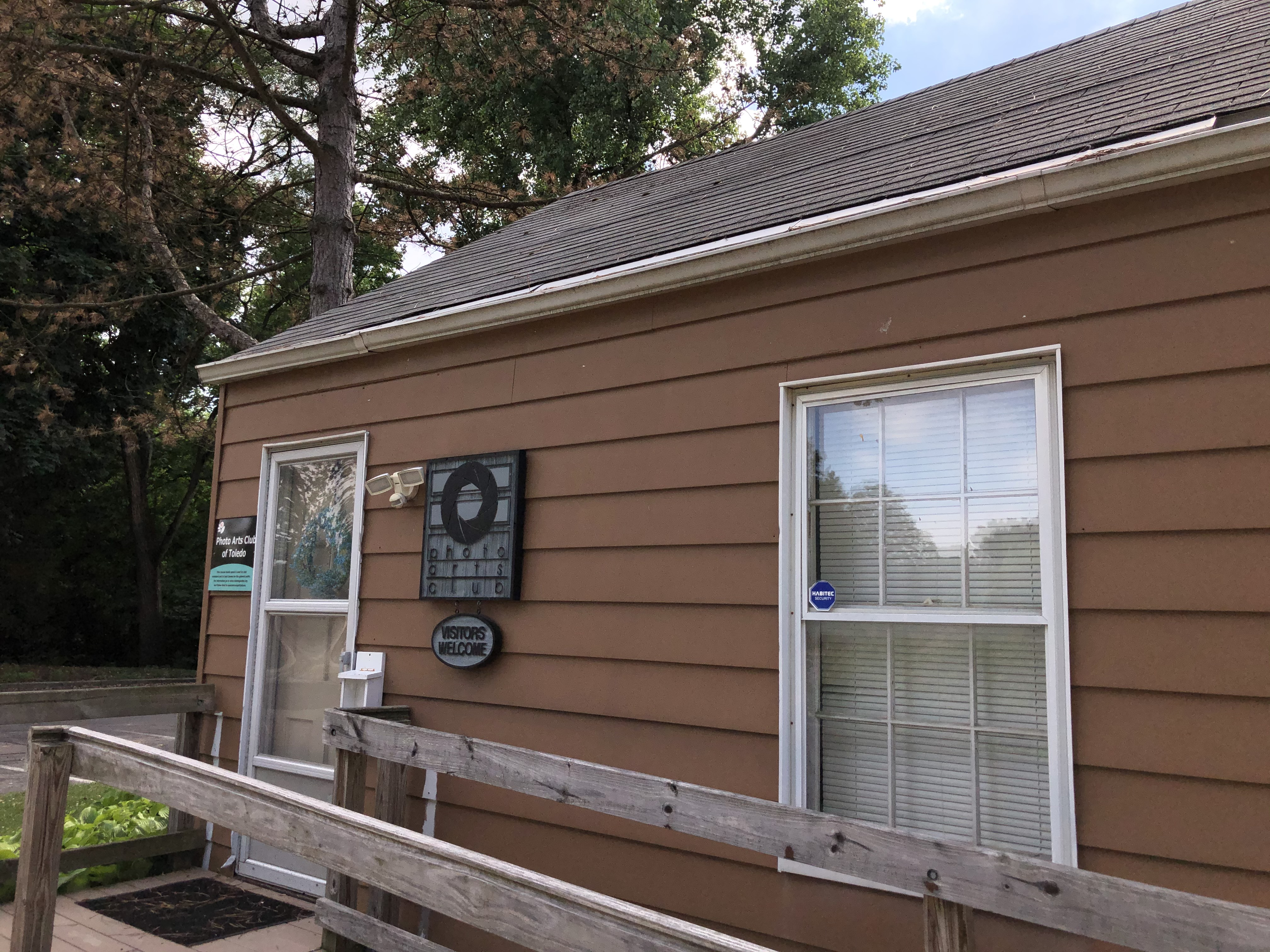
Photo Arts Club of Toledo office at the Garden

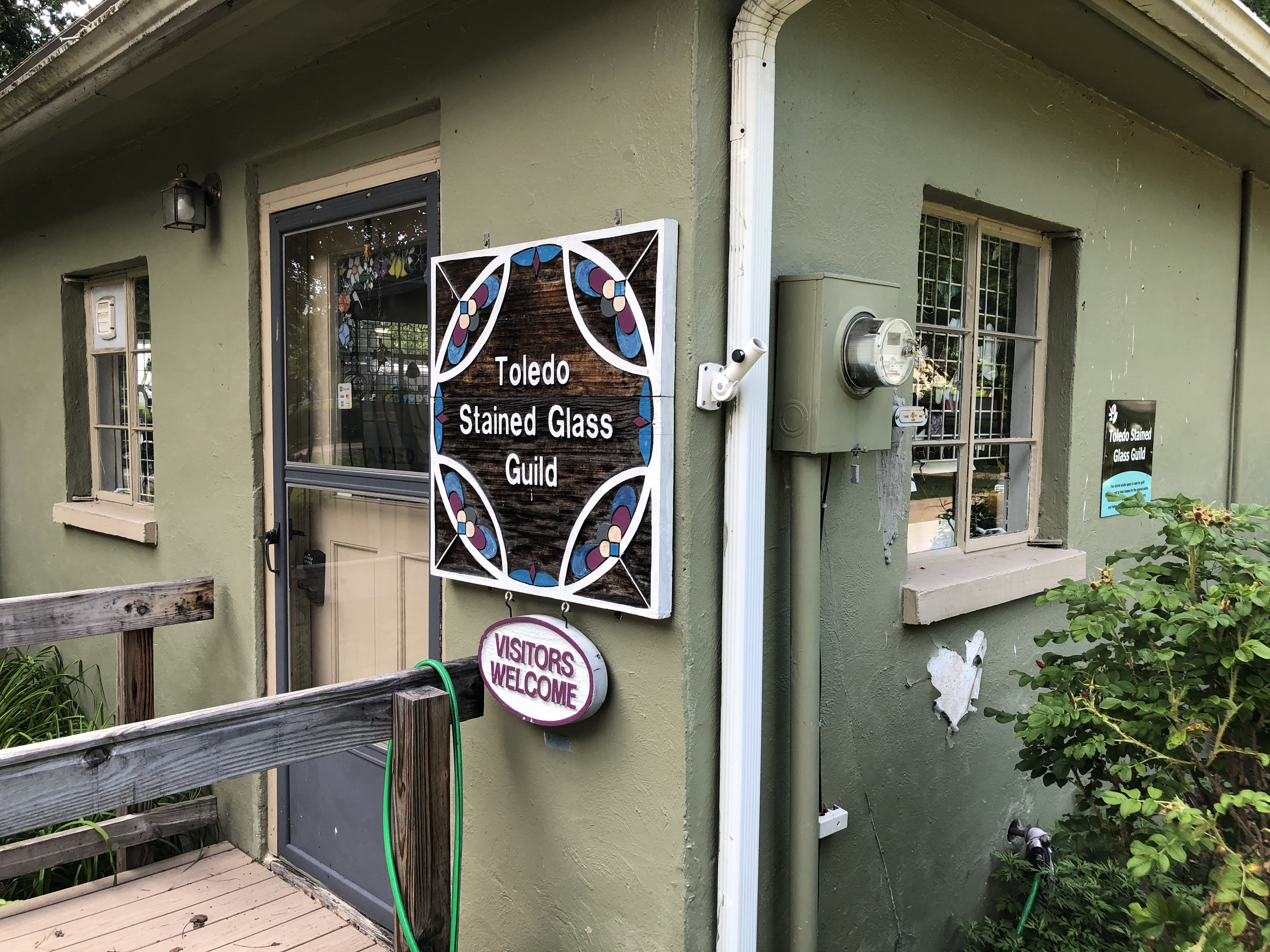
Toledo Stained Glass Guild

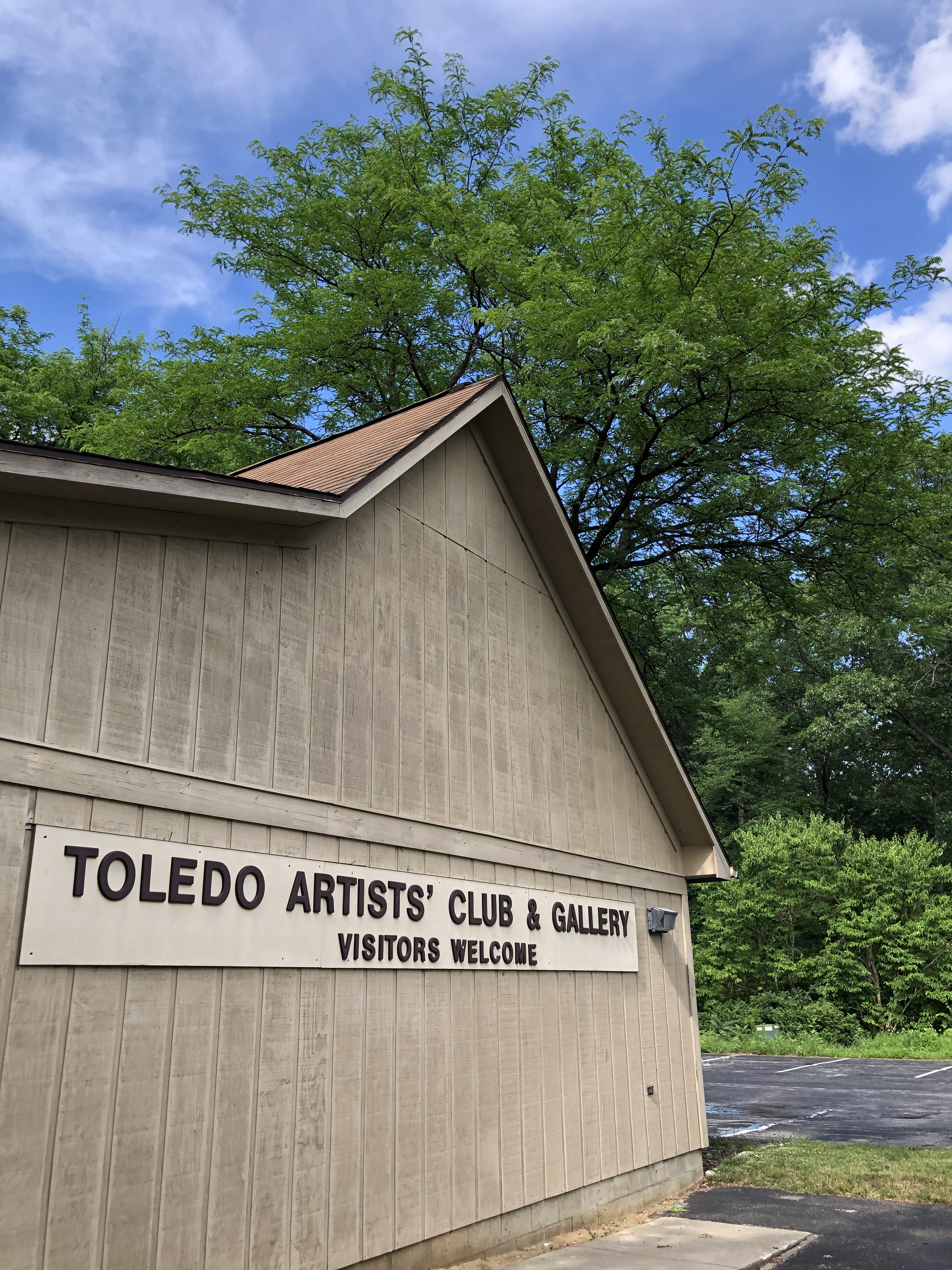
Toledo Artist's Club

== See also ==
- List of botanical gardens in the United States
- North American Plant Collections Consortium
