= Interurban Bridge =

- U.S. National Register of Historic Places
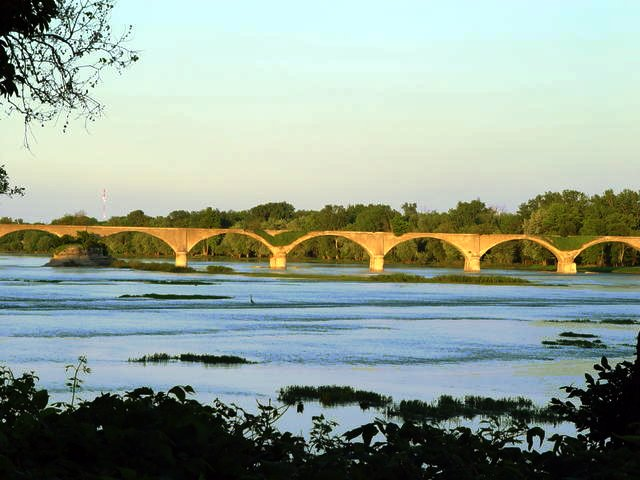
- Interurban Bridge and Roche de Bout

- Location within Ohio Location within the United States
- Nearest city: Waterville, Ohio
- Coordinates: 41°29′11″N 83°43′42″W
- Built: 1908
- Architect: National Bridge Co.
- NRHP reference No.: 72001036
- Added to NRHP: June 19, 1972

The Interurban Bridge, also known as the Ohio Electric Railroad Bridge. is a historic interurban railway reinforced concrete multiple arch bridge built in 1908 to span the Maumee River joining Lucas and Wood counties near Waterville, Ohio. The span was once the world's largest earth-filled reinforced concrete bridge. One of the bridge's supports rests on the Roche de Boeuf, a historic Indian council rock, which was partially destroyed by the bridge's construction. The bridge, which is no longer in use, is a popular subject for photographers and painters, who view it from Farnsworth Metropark.

== Builder Lima-Toledo Traction ==
The bridge has been abandoned for many years. It was constructed by the Lima-Toledo Traction company, an early 1900s interurban trolley line that ran primarily adjacent to the Baltimore and Ohio steam railroad from Toledo to Lima and from there south to Springfield on a connecting interurban line, the Dayton, Springfield, and Urbana. Many Ohio interurban lines struggled financially from inception. In an attempt to create operational efficiency under one management, the L-T along with other Ohio interurbans was brought under lease control of the Ohio Electric corporation to form one large widespread Ohio interurban network. All equipment was relettered and operated as the Ohio Electric Railway. Financially the consolidation didn't work, and when the OE went bankrupt in 1921, the L-T returned to its former owners and operated as the Lima-Toledo Railroad. It continued interurban service between Toledo and Lima using its essential long bridge over the wide Maumee River.

== Final railway use by the Cincinnati and Lake Erie Railroad ==
In 1929, two adjacent Ohio interurbans (the Cincinnati Hamilton and Dayton, and the Indiana, Columbus and Eastern) combined with the Lima-Toledo to form the 323 mile long Cincinnati and Lake Erie Railroad to establish interurban service from Toledo to distant Cincinnati. A branch operated from Springfield to Ohio's capital Columbus. The corporate goal was to increase passenger business and particularly interurban freight business in this heavily industrialized part of Ohio. From 1929 to 1930, the C&LE borrowed heavily to rebuild track and purchase new passenger and freight equipment in order to provide high speed operation between its major cities of Toledo, Lima, Springfield, Dayton, and Cincinnati. Starting at 1930, the C&LE was successful and business increased particularly with freight shipments, but the collapsing national and local economy in the following years due to the Great Depression, numerous floods requiring very expensive track and facility reconstruction, competition from newly paved state highways carrying growing automobile and truck competition steadily reduced revenue and forced C&LE abandonment in 1937. This was the last year that the Interurban Bridge saw rail traffic. On June 19, 1972, it was added to the National Register of Historic Places.

== Rehabilitation ==
In 2026 the Ohio Department of Transportation began a project to rehabilite the bridge into a pedestrian walkway.
