= University/Parks Trail =

Trail in Toledo, Ohio, United States

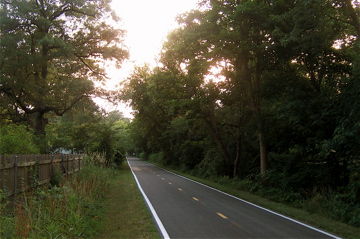
- Section of the Trail between Holland-Sylvania Road and McCord Road
- Length: 6.3 mi (10.1 km)
- Location: Lucas County, Ohio, USA
- Trailheads: University of Toledo to Sylvania, Ohio
- Use: Multi-use
- Difficulty: Wheelchair accessible
- Season: Year-round
- Sights: Wildwood Preserve Metropark
- Right of way: Toledo, Angola and Western Railroad

The University/Parks Trail is a rail trail in metropolitan area of Toledo, Ohio, United States. The trail is open to walkers, bikers, joggers and in-line skaters.

== Location ==
- Western terminus: Sylvania, intersection with Silica Road 41°40′58″N 83°43′59″W
- Eastern terminus: University of Toledo, intersection with East Rocket Drive 41°39′16″N 83°36′45″W

The entire route is in Lucas County.

Location	mi	km	Destinations	Notes
Sylvania Township	−2.65	−4.26	Quarry Ridge Trail	Future western terminus
Sylvania Township	−2.58	−4.15	Sylvania Avenue	
Sylvania Township	−1.35	−2.17	Centennial Road	
Sylvania Township	−0.55	−0.89	Silica Drive	Temporary western terminus
Sylvania Township	0.00	0.00	King Road	Beginning of milepost system; original western terminus
Sylvania Township	1.02	1.64	McCord Road	Parking
Sylvania Township	2.05	3.30	Holland-Sylvania Road	
Sylvania Township	2.58	4.15	Wildwood Preserve Connector	To Wildwood Preserve Metropark
Sylvania Township	2.97	4.78	To US 20	Connector to Reynolds Road
Toledo	4.42	7.11	Bancroft Road	
Toledo	4.86	7.82	Richards Road	
Toledo	5.88	9.46	Secor Road	Grade Separation
Toledo	6.41	10.32	East Rocket Drive	Eastern Terminus
1.000 mi = 1.609 km; 1.000 km = 0.621 mi: Unopened

== Trail route ==
The trail runs over the right-of-way of the late Toledo, Angola and Western Railroad. Starting at the University of Toledo, the trail runs 7.0 miles (11.3 km) to Silica Road in Sylvania, Ohio. The trail crosses roads seven times, twice over rail bridge. The other crosses form intersections, two of which have stop lights. The park has neighborhood access, and has an entrance to Wildwood Preserve Metropark. From King Road, one can travel north to Milton Olander Park and east to Westfield Franklin Park. From the University of Toledo, one can travel northeast to Ottawa Park.

== History ==
The path the trail follows was originally the tracks of the Toledo, Angola and Western Railroad, laid in 1902. When the railroad abandoned their right of way, five public agencies joined to create the trail. The trail was completed with a $1.3 million federal grant, given through the Ohio Department of Transportation. The trail officially opened to public use in September 1995, although many had been enjoying the paved parts of the path as construction was going on elsewhere on the path. In July 2019 a .6 mile extension was opened from King Road to Silica Road.

== Involved public agencies ==
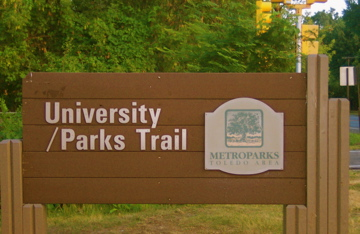
Trail sign on McCord Road.

Five public agencies were involved in the creation of the trail; they are:

- Lucas County Commissioners and Engineer's Office
- City of Toledo
- Metroparks of the Toledo Area
- Sylvania Area Joint Recreation District
- The University of Toledo

== See also ==
- Metroparks of the Toledo Area
- Rails to trails
