= Blue Creek Metropark =

Conservation area

Coordinates: 41.503°N 83.801°W

- Interactive map of Blue Creek Metropark
- Type: Conservation area
- Location: Whitehouse, Ohio
- Area: 678 acres (274 ha)
- Created: 2000
- Operator: Metroparks Toledo
- Open: Year-round, 7 a.m. until dark daily

Blue Creek Metropark is a park and conservation area in Whitehouse and Waterville Township, Ohio, owned by Metroparks Toledo and partially leased to the city of Whitehouse.

The rustic area has a parking lot and a one-mile loop trail leading to a wetland and a quarry pond. Fishing is permitted in the pond. A temporary restroom is located in the parking lot.

The park has exposed glacial striations dating back 12,000 years, formed when glaciers pushed granite over limestone.

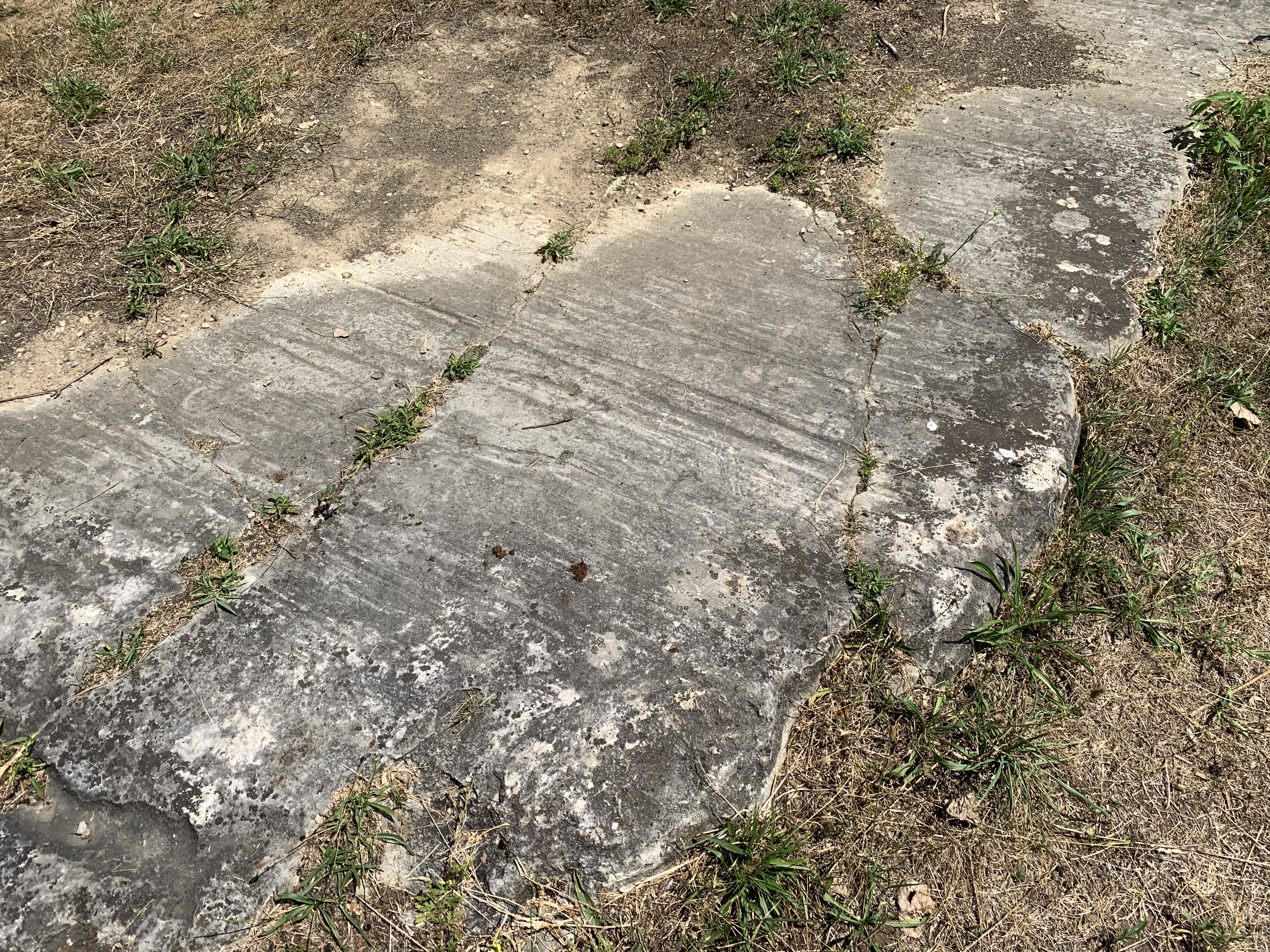
Exposed glacial striations at Blue Creek Metropark.

== History ==
In the 18th century, the Wyandot, Potawatomi, Ottawa, and Chippewa lived on the land. By the 19th century, it was being used for quarrying limestone. This was the case until Toledo purchased the property in 1917 as the location of the Toledo House of Corrections, which was used until 1991.

In 2019 the Ohio Department of Natural Resources installed a seismometer at the park to monitor the Bowling Green Fault Line.
