= Peter Navarre =

Prominent early settler of the Maumee valley

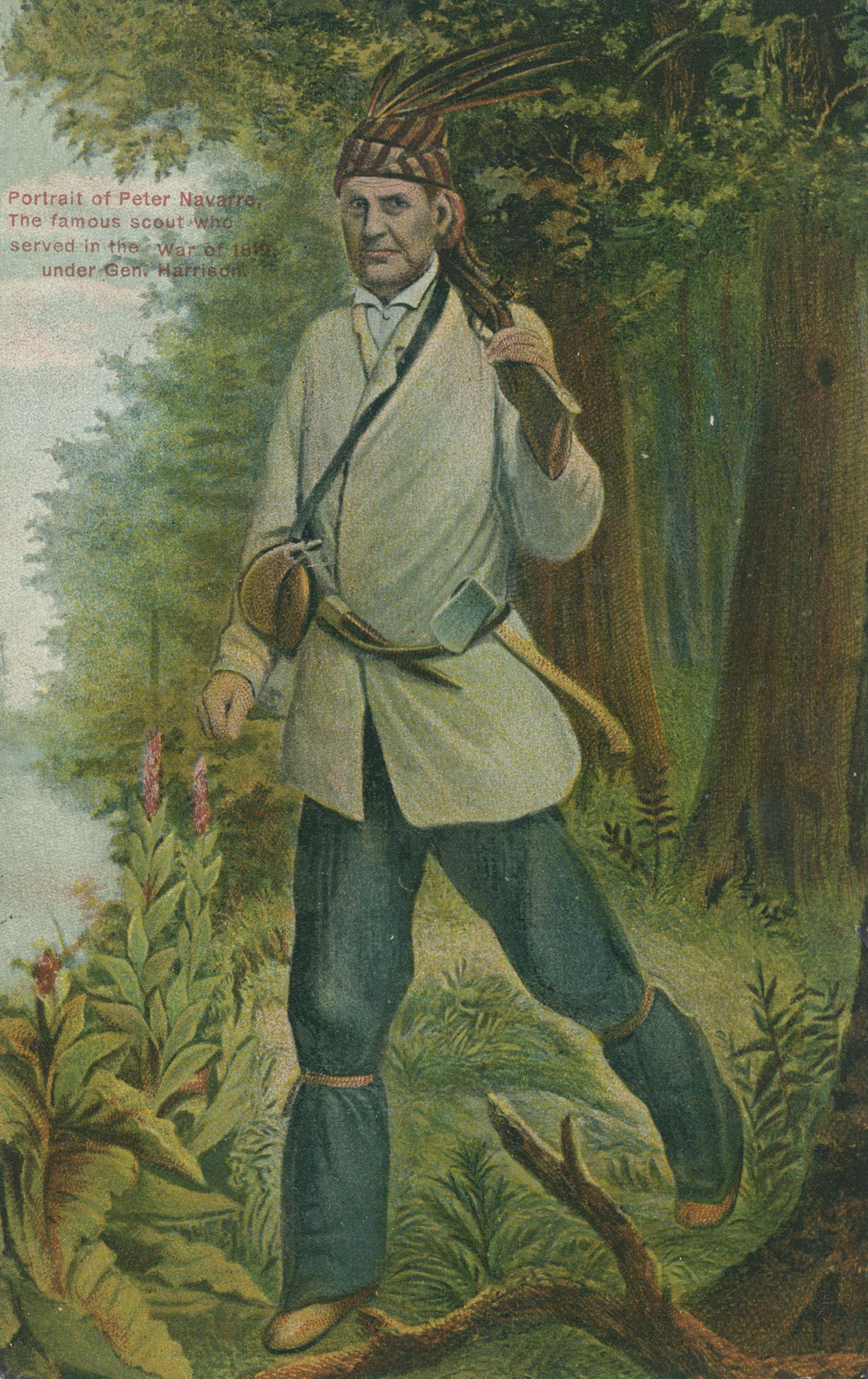
Postcard depicting Navarre, based on a drawing from Henry Howe's History of Ohio (1888)

Peter Navarre (c. 1785–1874) was an early settler of the Maumee valley. He was said to be the grandson of a French army officer, who visited this section in 1745. Navarre was born at Detroit in about 1785, where his father before him was born. In 1807, with his brother Robert, he erected a cabin near the mouth of the Maumee River (east side), which continued to be his residence for the remainder of his life. Besides Canadian French he could speak the Pottawatomie dialect, and partially those of other tribes. He was skillful in woodcraft and Native American methods, while his bearing was ever that of a "born gentleman". For several years he was employed by a Detroit house in buying furs of the Miamis near Fort Wayne, Indiana, where he made the acquaintance and friendship of chief Little Turtle.

== War of 1812 ==
The War of 1812 closed the fur trade, when Navarre and his three brothers—Robert, Alexis and Jaquot (James)--tendered their services to General William Hull. He also besought Hull to accept the services of the Miamis, which were declined, and they afterwards took part with the British. Before seeing active service, the Navarres were included in the surrender of Hull, and paroled, although they denied the right to treat him as a prisoner of war and at once took an active part for the United States; whereupon General Proctor, the British commander, offered a reward of $1000 for Navarre's head or scalp.

Peter Navarre assisted in delivering sharpshooters to the Battle of Lake Erie and delivered Oliver Hazard Perry's message "We have met the enemy, and they are ours" to William Henry Harrison.

Peter Navarre survived the Battle of Frenchtown.

Until the close of the war he acted as a scout for General William Henry Harrison. He used to say that the worst night he ever spent was as a bearer of a despatch from Harrison, then at Fort Meigs, to Fort Stephenson. Amid a thunderstorm of great fury and fall of water, he made the trip of over thirty miles through unbroken wilderness, and the morning following delivered to Harrison a reply.

== Postwar ==
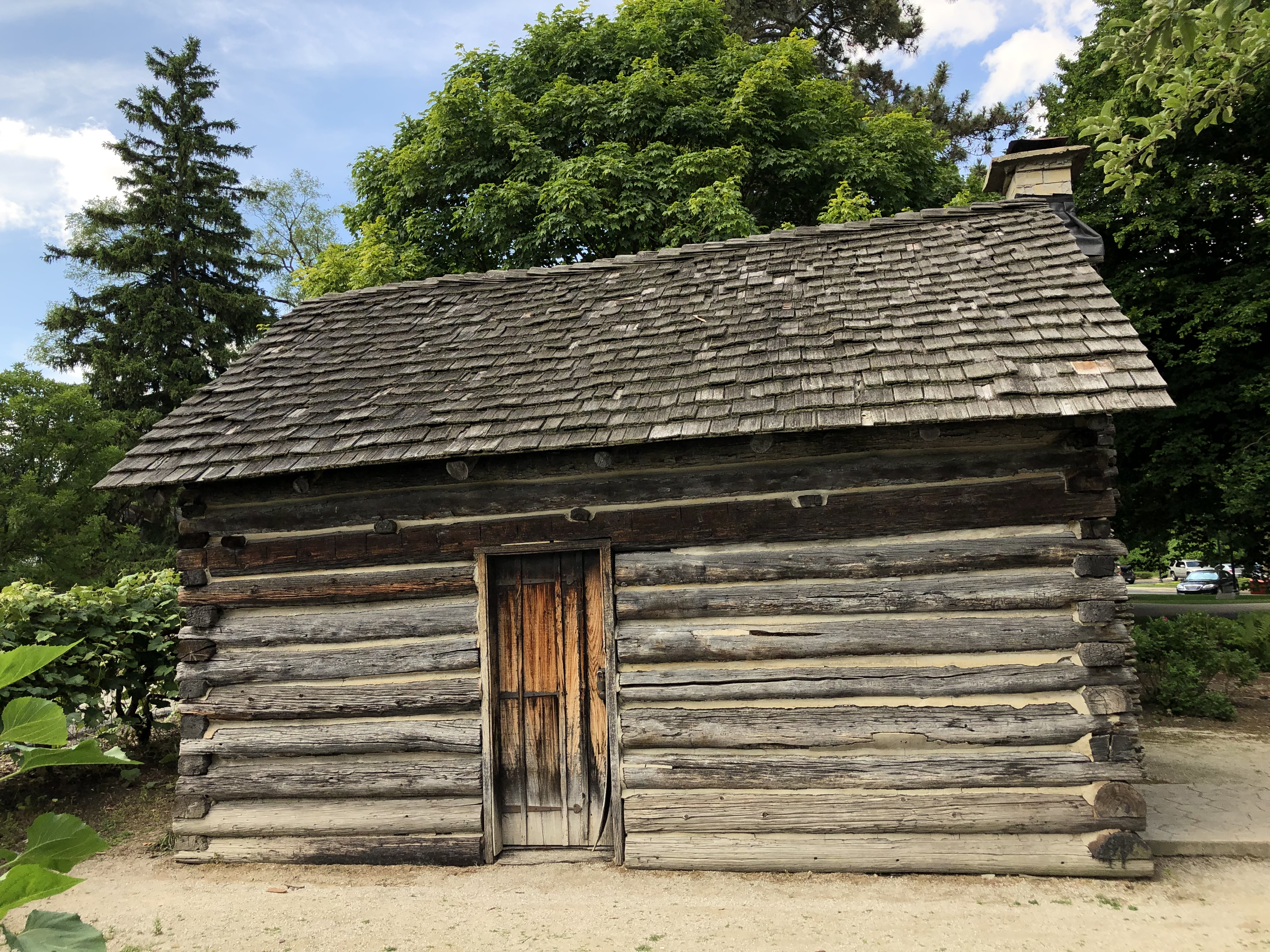
The Peter Navarre Cabin, currently located in the Toledo Botanical Garden.

Because his name was not on an enlistment roll, the law provided no pension for his service, but by special act of Congress his last days were made more comfortable by pecuniary relief. At the close of the war he returned to his home, near the mouth of the Maumee river, where he spent the balance of his life, dying in East Toledo, 20 March 1874, aged 89. For several years previous to his death he served as President of the Maumee Valley Pioneer Association.

== Legacy ==
Toledo, Ohio celebrates Peter Navarre Day on September 9. Navarre Park, Navarre Elementary School, and Navarre Avenue (part of Ohio State Route 2 through Toledo and Oregon), are named in honor of Peter Navarre.

== Sources ==
- Henry Howe's History of Ohio
