= Oak Openings Preserve Metropark =

Nature preserve in Swanton Township, Ohio, U.S.

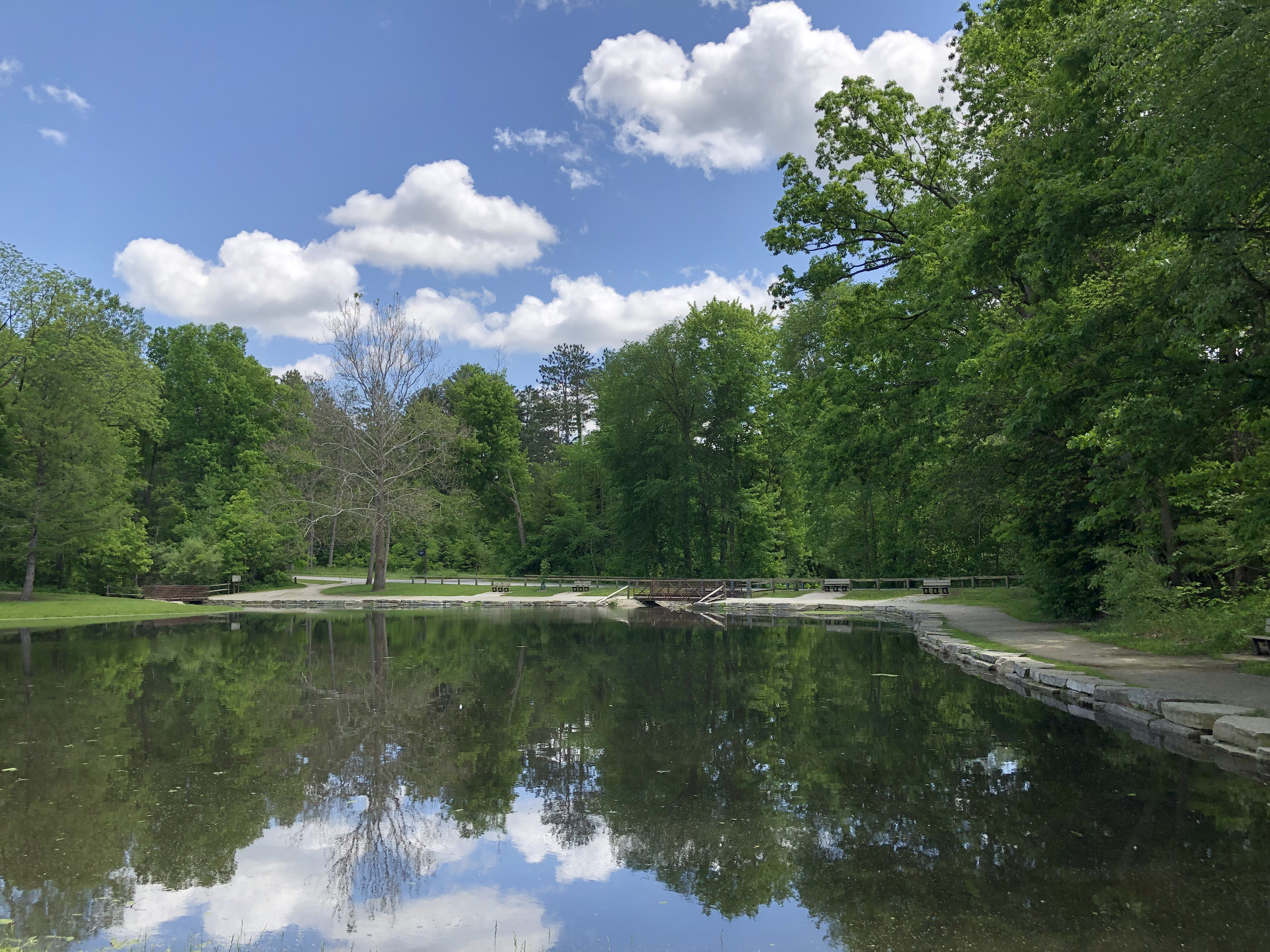
- Mallard Lake at Oak Openings
- Interactive map of Oak Openings Preserve Metropark
- Type: Nature preserve
- Location: Swanton Township, Ohio
- Coordinates: 41°33′14″N 83°51′11″W
- Area: 4,291 acres (1,737 ha)
- Created: 1931
- Operator: Metroparks Toledo
- Open: Year-round, 7 a.m. until dark daily
- Website: Oak Openings Preserve Metropark

Oak Openings Preserve Metropark is a nature preserve located in Swanton Township, Ohio, owned and operated by Metroparks Toledo. Most of the park is an oak savanna ecosystem, characterized by alternating wetland and vegetated dunes.

Pine plantation known as The Spot, Oak Openings Preserve Metropark

The park hosts the Beuhner Center, an interactive nature center. There are over fifty miles of trails in Oak Openings Preserve.

The park gets its name from the region in which it is located. Oak Openings Preserve lies within the larger Oak Openings Region. The region hosts over 180 rare species of plants and animals. This is over one-third of all rare species found in the state of Ohio.

According to The Nature Conservancy, the Oak Openings Region is one of the 200 "Last Great Places on Earth".

== Gallery ==
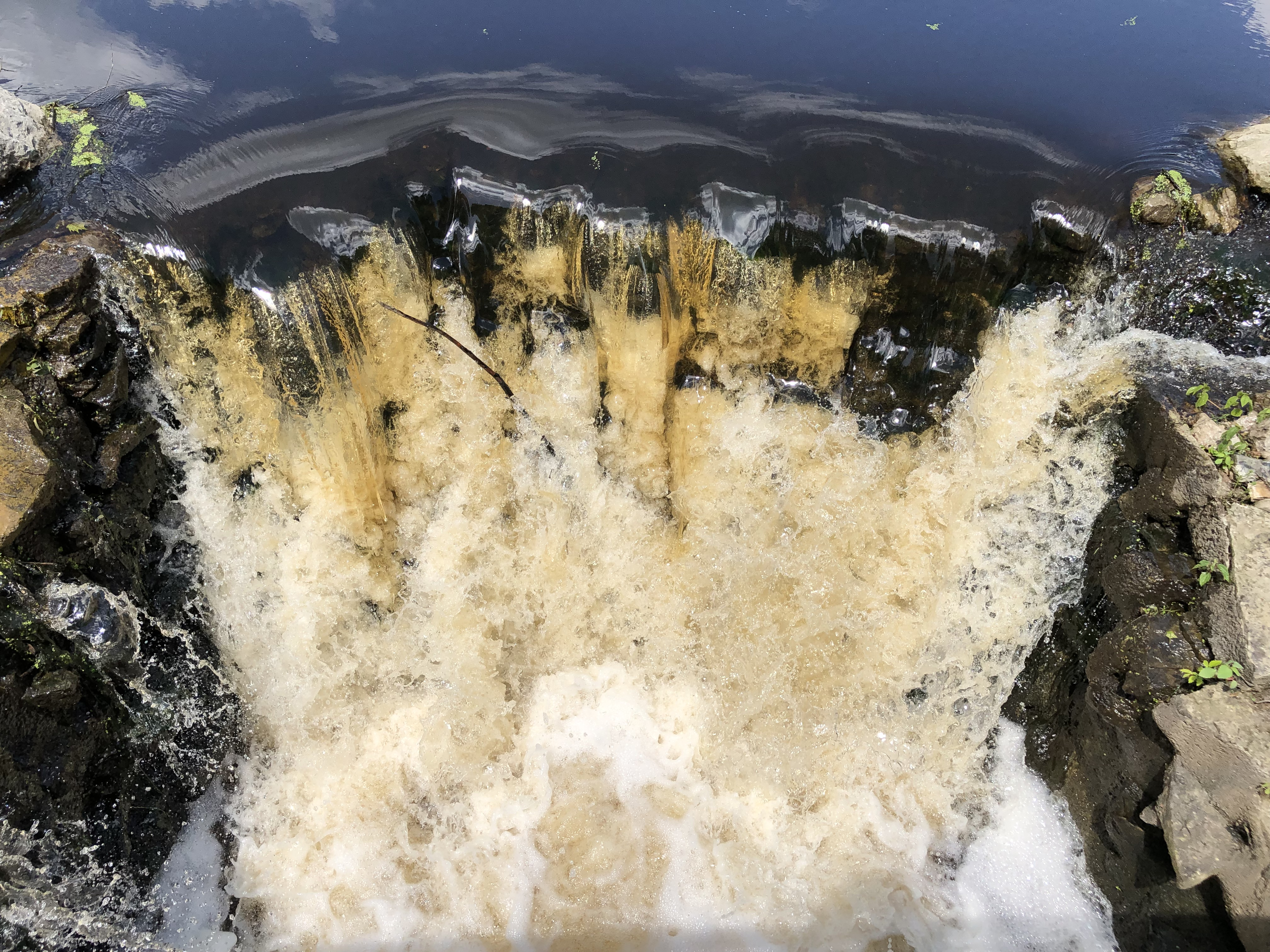
The falls at Mallard Lake.
