= Oak Openings Region =

Globally rare ecosystem in Michigan and Ohio, U.S.

Coordinates: 41.81°N 83.69°W

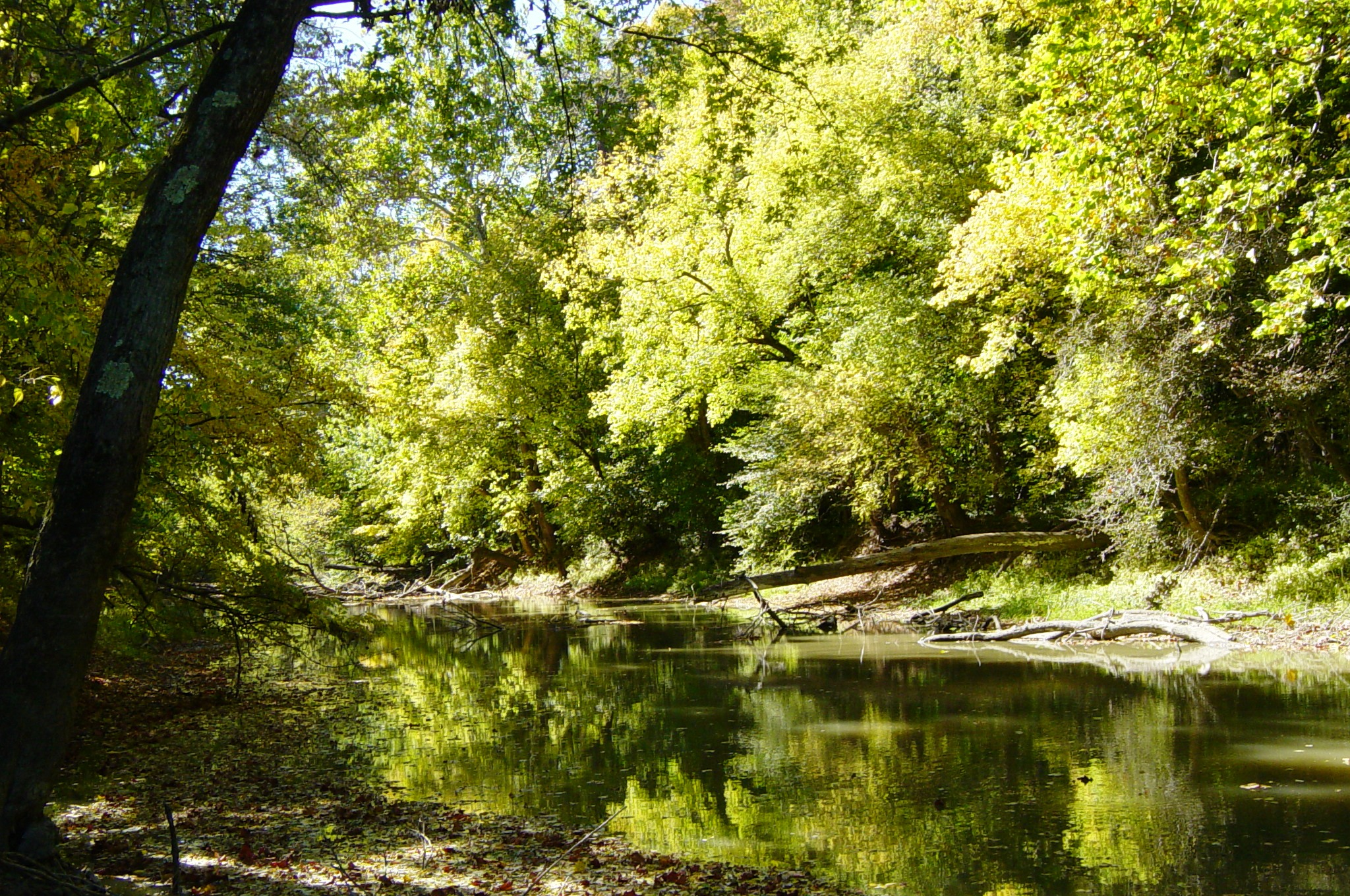
The Tiffin River at Goll Woods

The Oak Openings Region is a globally rare ecosystem composed of over 1,300 square miles (3,400 km^{2}) of Michigan and Ohio. The land consists largely of oak savanna and grassland prairie. It is considered by The Nature Conservancy as having a similar ecological importance as the Florida Everglades and is one of the 200 "Last Great Places on Earth".

This unique area was formed after the last ice age when the continental glacier melted leaving behind a large lake called Lake Warren. Over time, this lake was gradually reduced to present day Lake Erie and left behind a large tract of sandy soil to the west. The area was frequented by wildfires that only the thick-barked oak trees could survive. When pioneers arrived after first crossing through the Great Black Swamp they called the area the "Oak Openings" as a comparison to the thick swamp.

Today, the Oak Openings Preserve Metropark is the largest intact piece of mostly dry savanna remaining. The largest sections of swamp and savanna, are in the hands of citizens Goll Woods State Nature Preserve also protects a small area of Oak Openings.
