= Waterville, Ohio =

- City
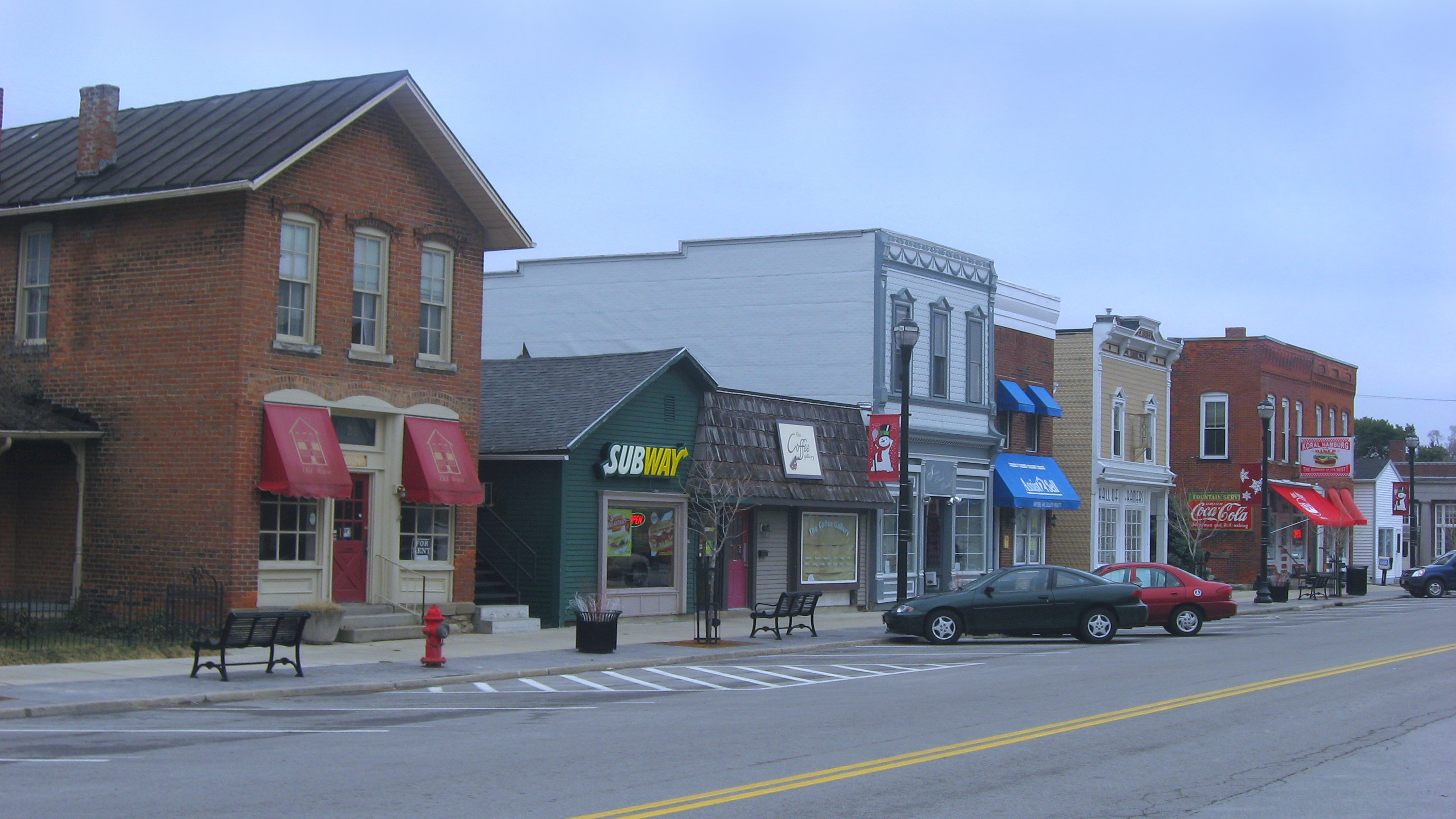
- Third Street downtown

- Flag Seal
- Motto: "On the Banks of History"
- Interactive map of Waterville, Ohio
- Location within Ohio Location within the United States
- Coordinates: 41°30′05″N 83°44′12″W
- Country: United States
- State: Ohio
- County: Lucas
- Established: 1832; 194 years ago
- Incorporated as a city: 2011; 15 years ago

Government
  - Mayor: Tim Pedro

Area
  - Total: 5.35 sq mi (13.85 km^{2})
  - Land: 5.16 sq mi (13.37 km^{2})
  - Water: 0.19 sq mi (0.48 km^{2})
- Elevation: 653 ft (199 m)

Population (2020)
  - Total: 6,003
  - Density: 1,162.6/sq mi (448.88/km^{2})
- Time zone: UTC-5 (EST)
  - Summer (DST): UTC-4 (EDT)
- ZIP code: 43566
- Area code: 419
- FIPS code: 39-81858
- GNIS feature ID: 2400105
- Website: http://www.waterville.org/

Waterville is a city in Lucas County, Ohio, United States, along the Maumee River. It is a suburb of Toledo. Its population at the 2020 census was 6,003.

== History ==
Waterville was platted in 1830 by settler John Pray on the west bank of the upper Maumee River opposite what was then known as Pray's Falls, a rapids on that stream. A post office called Waterville has been in operation since 1828.

== Geography ==
According to the United States Census Bureau, the city has a total area of 4.88 square miles (12.64 km^{2}), of which 4.69 square miles (12.15 km^{2}) is land and 0.19 square miles (0.49 km^{2}) is water.

The community is located on the Maumee River and was formerly on the Miami and Erie Canal route.

== Demographics ==
Historical population
Census	Pop.	Note	%±
1880	382		—
1890	586		53.4%
1900	703		20.0%
1910	834		18.6%
1920	779		−6.6%
1930	973		24.9%
1940	961		−1.2%
1950	1,110		15.5%
1960	1,856		67.2%
1970	2,940		58.4%
1980	3,884		32.1%
1990	4,517		16.3%
2000	4,828		6.9%
2010	5,523		14.4%
2020	6,003		8.7%

=== 2020 census ===
As of the 2020 census, Waterville had a population of 6,003. The median age was 42.6 years, with 24.2% of residents under the age of 18 and 20.9% aged 65 years or older. For every 100 females there were 97.9 males, and for every 100 females age 18 and over there were 95.0 males age 18 and over.

99.0% of residents lived in urban areas, while 1.0% lived in rural areas.

There were 2,300 households in Waterville, of which 34.2% had children under the age of 18 living in them. Of all households, 59.4% were married-couple households, 14.5% were households with a male householder and no spouse or partner present, and 21.2% were households with a female householder and no spouse or partner present. About 24.7% of all households were made up of individuals and 13.8% had someone living alone who was 65 years of age or older.

There were 2,486 housing units, of which 7.5% were vacant. The homeowner vacancy rate was 0.7% and the rental vacancy rate was 19.5%.

Racial composition as of the 2020 census
Race	Number	Percent
White	5,589	93.1%
Black or African American	46	0.8%
American Indian and Alaska Native	13	0.2%
Asian	49	0.8%
Native Hawaiian and Other Pacific Islander	0	0.0%
Some other race	61	1.0%
Two or more races	245	4.1%
Hispanic or Latino (of any race)	218	3.6%

=== 2010 census ===
As of the census of 2010, there were 5,523 people, 2,065 households, and 1,566 families living in the village. The population density was 1,177.6 inhabitants per square mile (454.7/km^{2}). There were 2,151 housing units at an average density of 458.6 per square mile (177.1/km^{2}). The racial makeup of the city was 96.7% White, 0.5% African American, 0.1% Native American, 1.0% Asian, 0.6% from other races, and 1.2% from two or more races. Hispanic or Latino of any race were 2.7% of the population.

There were 2,065 households, of which 38.5% had children under the age of 18 living with them, 63.9% were married couples living together, 8.6% had a female householder with no husband present, 3.4% had a male householder with no wife present, and 24.2% were non-families. 20.5% of all households were made up of individuals, and 9.4% had someone living alone who was 65 years of age or older. The average household size was 2.62 and the average family size was 3.03.

The median age in the city was 41.6 years. 25.9% of residents were under the age of 18; 6.1% were between the ages of 18 and 24; 22.8% were from 25 to 44; 31.3% were from 45 to 64; and 13.9% were 65 years of age or older. The gender makeup of the village was 48.1% male and 51.9% female.

=== 2000 census ===
As of the census of 2000, there were 4,828 people, 1,726 households, and 1,322 families living in the village. The population density was 1,378.7 inhabitants per square mile (532.3/km^{2}). There were 1,809 housing units at an average density of 516.6 per square mile (199.5/km^{2}). The racial makeup of the village was 97.91% White, 0.14% African American, 0.14% Native American, 0.35% Asian, 0.56% from other races, and 0.89% from two or more races. Hispanic or Latino of any race were 1.35% of the population.

There were 1,726 households, out of which 39.0% had children under the age of 18 living with them, 66.6% were married couples living together, 6.9% had a female householder with no husband present, and 23.4% were non-families. 19.8% of all households were made up of individuals, and 8.2% had someone living alone who was 65 years of age or older. The average household size was 2.70 and the average family size was 3.15.

In the village the population was spread out, with 28.1% under the age of 18, 5.8% from 18 to 24, 27.5% from 25 to 44, 25.3% from 45 to 64, and 13.3% who were 65 years of age or older. The median age was 39 years. For every 100 females, there were 92.7 males. For every 100 females age 18 and over, there were 89.3 males.

The median income for a household in the village was $60,000, and the median income for a family was $71,027. Males had a median income of $49,489 versus $31,638 for females. The per capita income for the village was $23,679. About 1.9% of families and 1.8% of the population were below the poverty line, including 1.4% of those under age 18 and 5.5% of those age 65 or over.

== Arts and culture ==
=== Historic sites ===
The Interurban Bridge, also known as the Ohio Electric Railroad Bridge. is a historic interurban railroad bridge built in 1908 across the Maumee River joining Lucas and Wood counties near Waterville, Ohio. It is now located in Farnsworth Metropark. One of the bridge's supports is the Roche de Boeuf, a historic Indian council rock, which was partially destroyed by the bridge construction. On June 19, 1972, it was added to the National Register of Historic Places. The bridge has been abandoned for several years.

Built in 1828, John Pray constructed a house to serve as a trading post, tavern and hostel located in Waterville, OH. It became the centerpiece of the village. The place where locals and travelers alike escaped from the harsh Summers and Winters. Constructed from black walnut beams, it quickly transformed into a third-story structure containing a prison cell (for transit prisoners), a dressmaker's shop and doctor. Like many historic buildings, this one switched hands many times over the years, becoming a restaurant between 1943 and 1993.

== Parks and recreation ==
Baer Park has a playground, baseball field, basketball courts, tennis courts, shuffleboard area, and walking path.

== Government ==
The City of Waterville is organized as a Strong Administrator form of government. The City Administrator is the CEO of the Municipal Corporation, overseeing the day-to-day operations of the city. The mayor (currently Timothy Pedro) and City Council members (currently Barb Bruno, Anthony Bruno, Rodney Frey, Mary Duncan, Todd Borowski, and John Rozic) serve part-time.

== Education ==
Anthony Wayne Local School District administers public schools in the city.

Waterville has a public library, a branch of the Toledo-Lucas County Public Library.

== Infrastructure ==
The city has a full-time police department and public works department. The fire department is staffed by a full-time fire chief and deputy chief, and is supported by a combination of part-time and volunteer firefighters.
