= Regional park =

Area of land preserved under a form of local government

A regional park is an area of land preserved on account of its natural beauty, historic interest, recreational use or other reason, and under the administration of a form of local government.

== Definition ==
A regional park can be a special park district covering a region crossing several jurisdictional boundaries, or a park system of a single jurisdiction, such as a province, county, or city.

== By country ==
=== Canada ===
==== Saskatchewan ====
There are 101 regional parks in Saskatchewan. All parks are operated by volunteer boards.

=== Italy ===
Regional parks in Italy are administered by each region in Italy, a government unit like a U.S. state.

=== Ireland ===
Distinguished from National Parks in the Republic of Ireland, which are owned and run centrally by the state's National Parks and Wildlife Service, Ireland's regional parks are managed and operated by individual local authorities in Ireland. Examples include Ballincollig Regional Park (managed by Cork City Council), Millennium Regional Park (Fingal County Council), and Malahide Demesne Regional Park (also managed by Fingal County Council).

=== Lithuania ===
A law to establish regional parks in Lithuania took effect in 1992. As of 2022, there were 30 such regional parks (regioniniai parkai).

=== New Zealand ===
In New Zealand, regional parks are administered by regional councils rather than the Department of Conservation or territorial authorities.

=== United States ===
==== Definitions ====
In the United States, a regional park is sometimes referred to as a 'Metropolitan Park (Metropark)' or as an open space reserve. The terms region and metropolitan can have different meanings in U.S. local government agencies. Regional parks can be administered by a regional park board, a state, county or other units of local government. A special authority can be set up, under the joint jurisdiction of two or more government bodies or as an independent park district to administer parks. Individual parks may or may not cross governmental boundaries. The park district holds the authority, similar to fire protection districts, to manage and raise taxes to cover park acquisition and management costs.

==== Midwest ====
Examples of large regional park systems are the Cleveland Metroparks in Northeast Ohio, Huron-Clinton Metroparks in Southeast Michigan; and the Three Rivers Park District in Minnesota. In Ohio, under Ohio Revised Code Chapter 1545, metroparks such as the Cleveland Metroparks Park District, Summit Metroparks and Columbus and Franklin County Metro Parks have their own Police Departments with sworn police officers. The Toledo Metroparks, and Dayton Five Rivers Metroparks are also in the state.

==== California ====
The East Bay Regional Park District and Midpeninsula Regional Open Space District have extensive parklands in the San Francisco Bay Area, protecting habitat and offering recreation.

=== United Kingdom ===
==== Scotland ====
In Scotland, regional parks are defined to co-ordinate the management of areas of attractive countryside that are of importance for recreation due to their proximity to population centres. The parks have been defined and are managed by local authorities. As of 2018, Scotland had three regional parks:

- Clyde Muirshiel Regional Park
- Lomond Hills Regional Park
- Pentland Hills Regional Park

==== England ====
- Lee Valley Regional Park

Northern Ireland Lagan Valley Regional Park

== See also ==
- Regional natural parks of France
- Nature reserve
- Open space reserve
- State park
- Urban park
