= Martin Luther King Bridge (Toledo, Ohio) =

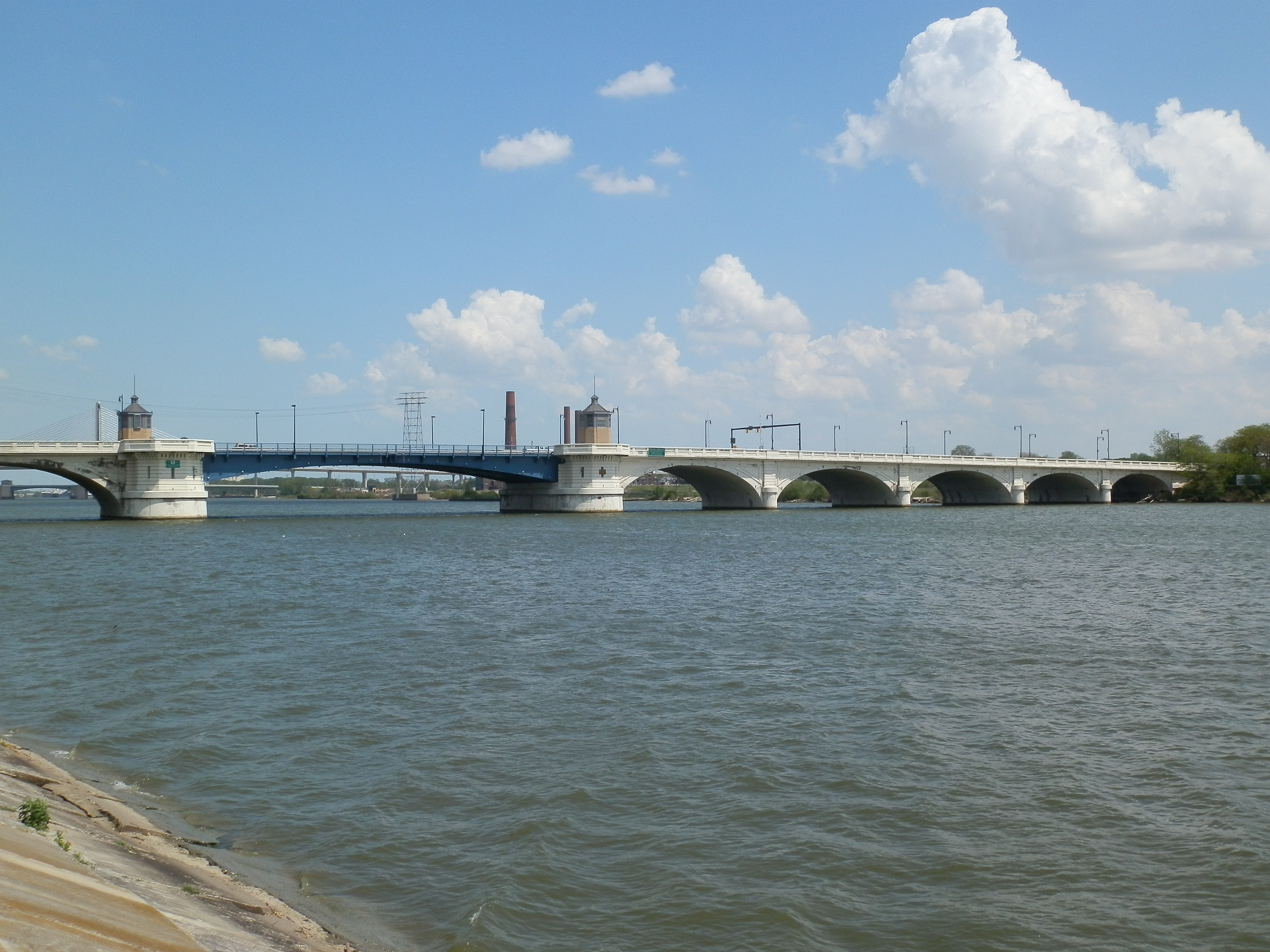
- Martin Luther King Memorial Bridge over the Maumee River in Toledo Ohio.
- Coordinates: 41°39′09″N 83°31′40″W
- Crosses: Maumee River
- Official name: Martin Luther King Bridge
- Other name: Cherry Street Bridge

Characteristics
- Total length: 1,100 feet (340 m)
- No. of lanes: 4 (after 2001)

History
- Designer: Arnold W. Brunner
- Engineering design by: Osborn Engineering
- Built: 1914
- Construction end: 1914
- Rebuilt: 2001

Location
- Interactive map of Martin Luther King Bridge

The Martin Luther King Memorial Bridge (formerly Cherry Street Bridge) is a double-leaf bascule bridge adjacent to downtown Toledo, Ohio, where Cherry Street crosses the Maumee River to become Main Street on the east side of the city. The structure opened to traffic in 1914.

== History ==
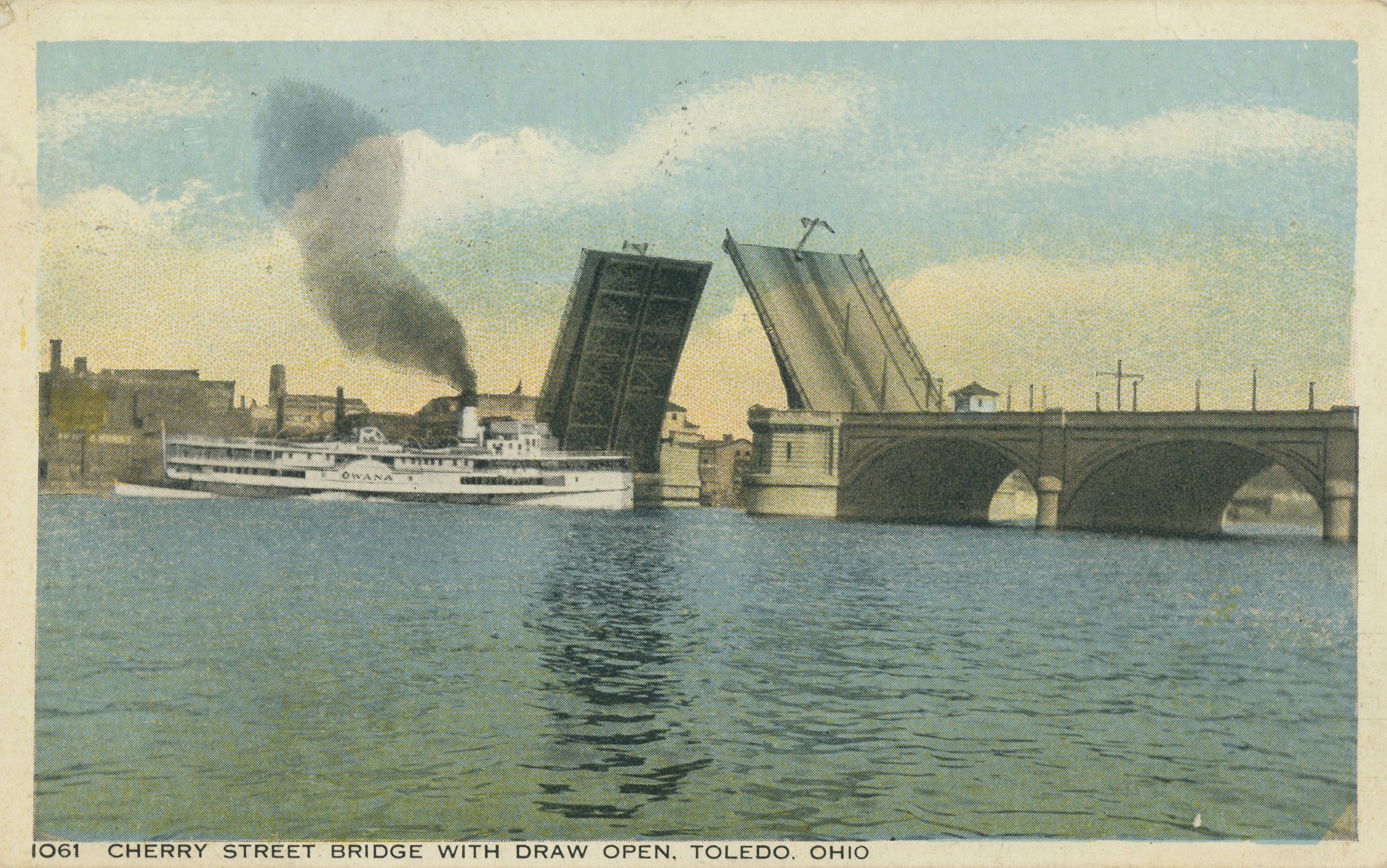
Cherry Street Bridge (now Martin Luther King Bridge) with draw open, 1917

In 2001 the city started what was to have been a $31 million USD refurbishment of the bridge. This refurbishment widened the bridge's four lanes and added pedestrian walkways. The bridge's original control towers were replaced with new towers, modeled after the originals.

When originally built, the streetcars operated by the Toledo Railways & Light Company shared the bridge with motor vehicles. The technique employed to keep the streetcar's power wire taut when in use, yet allowing the bridge to be raised, was considered innovative and was copied in similar bridges. The bridge's original deck was an open metal mesh.

The bridge was designed by Arnold W. Brunner and built by Osborn Engineering. The bridge, including its approaches, is 1,100 feet (340 m) long. It is located a mile upstream from the Veterans' Glass City Skyway where Interstate 280 crosses the river.

It was renamed from the Cherry Street Bridge to the Martin Luther King Jr. Memorial Bridge in January 1988 by the Toledo City Council.
