= Cherry Street, Toledo =

Major east-west roadway in Toledo, Ohio, United States

Cherry Street
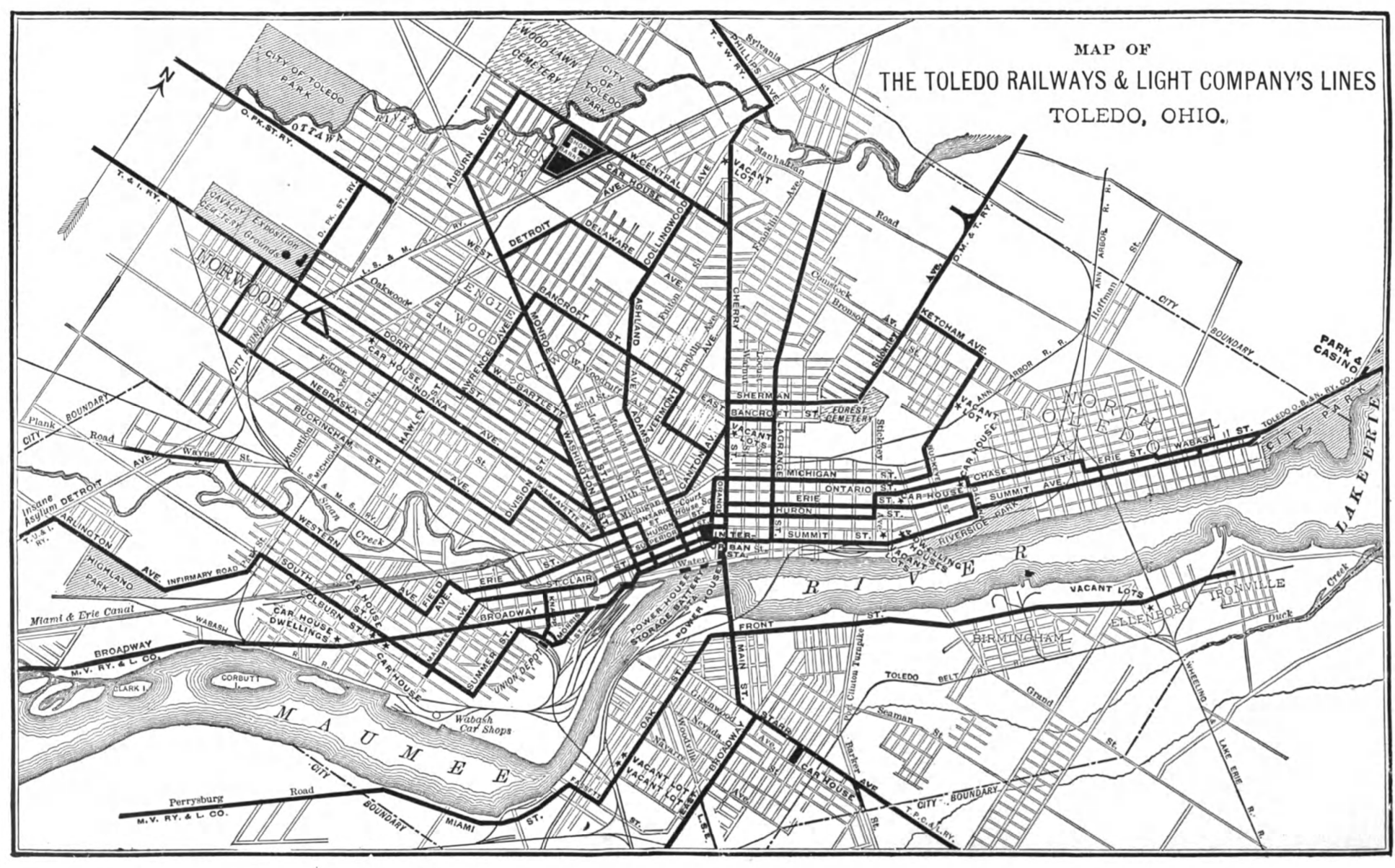
- Map of The Toledo Railways and Light Company's Lines, c. 1912

- Location within Ohio
- Location: Toledo, Ohio, U.S.
- Coordinates: 41°39′09″N 83°31′40″W

Cherry Street is a major east–west roadway in Toledo, Ohio. It crosses the Maumee River over the Martin Luther King Bridge, a bascule lift bridge, built in 1913.

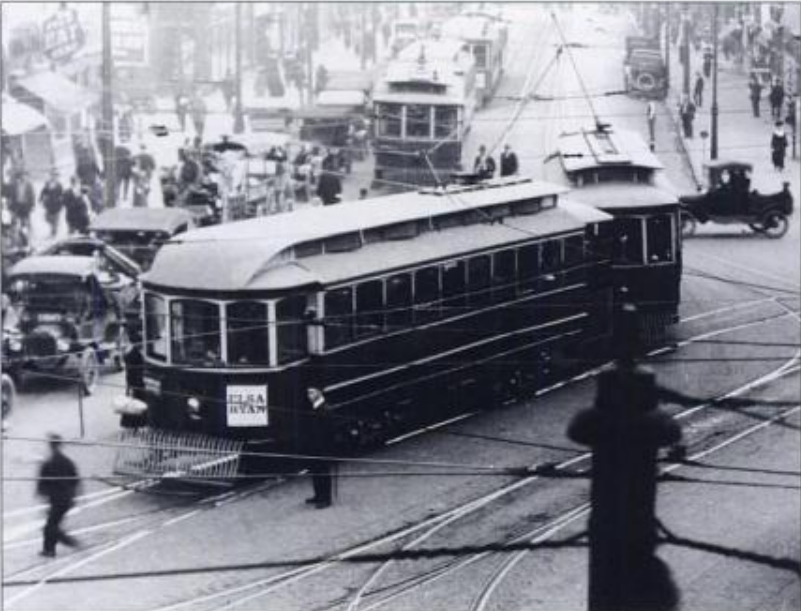
Cherry Street was once a major hub for the Toledo streetcars.

Toledo's first medical college was constructed at the corner of Cherry and Page streets, in 1896.

The street is approximately one mile south of Interstate 280.

The bridge was recognized as introducing an innovative technique for lift bridges to carry electric trolley and streetcars, powered by overhead wires. The bridge was modernized in 2001.
