= Robert Craig (Medal of Honor) =

Scottish-American WWII Medal of Honor recipient (1919–1943)

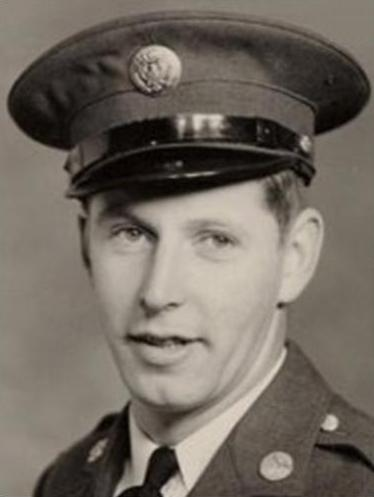
- Born: June 7, 1919; Airdrie, Scotland
- Died: July 11, 1943 (aged 24) near Favoratta, Sicily, Italy
- Burial place: Toledo Memorial Park, Sylvania, Ohio
- Military career
- Allegiance: United States
- Branch: United States Army
- Service years: 1941 – 1943
- Rank: Second Lieutenant
- Units: Company L, 15th Infantry Regiment, 3rd Infantry Division
- Conflicts: World War II: Operation Husky †
- Awards: Medal of Honor; Purple Heart

Robert Craig (June 7, 1919 – July 11, 1943) was a Scottish-born U.S. Army infantry officer and recipient of the Medal of Honor for heroic service during the Allied invasion of Sicily in World War II.

== Early life ==
Robert Craig was born on June 7, 1919, in Airdrie, Scotland, to William Craig Sr. from Belfast, Northern Ireland, and Jane (Montgomery) Craig from Airdrie, Scotland. He was the middle of three children, having an older brother, William Craig Jr., and a younger sister, Jane M. Craig. At the age of 4, his family departed from Glasgow, Scotland, aboard the SS Saturnia for North America, first arriving in Quebec, Canada, on September 1, 1923, before heading to the United States and settling in the Beverly neighborhood of Toledo, Ohio. His father, William, worked for 25 years as a machinist at the Libbey-Owens-Ford Company, and his mother, Jane, was a homemaker. Craig graduated from Libbey High School in 1937 and worked at Tiedtke’s as a salesclerk prior to enlistment.

== Military service ==
Craig enlisted in the United States Army on February 28, 1941 and on December 1, 1941 was commissioned a Second Lieutenant of infantry. Upon graduating from Officer Candidate School at Fort Benning, Georgia, Lieutenant Craig served with Company L, 15th Infantry Regiment, 3rd Infantry Division.

Lieutenant Craig’s official Medal of Honor citation reads:

For conspicuous gallantry and intrepidity at the risk of his life above and beyond the call of duty, on 11 July 1943, at Favoratta, Sicily. Second Lt. Craig voluntarily undertook the perilous task of locating and destroying a hidden enemy machine gun which had halted the advance of his company. Attempts by three other officers to locate the weapon had resulted in failure, with each officer receiving wounds. Second Lt. Craig located the gun and snaked his way to a point within 35 yards of the hostile position before being discovered. Charging headlong into the furious automatic fire, he reached the gun, stood over it, and killed the three crew members with his carbine. With this obstacle removed, his company continued its advance. Shortly thereafter, while advancing down the forward slope of a ridge, 2d Lt. Craig and his platoon, in a position devoid of cover and concealment, encountered the fire of approximately 100 enemy soldiers. Electing to sacrifice himself so that his platoon might carry on the battle, he ordered his men to withdraw to the cover of the crest while he drew the enemy fire to himself. With no hope of survival, he charged toward the enemy until he was within 25 yards of them. Assuming a kneeling position, he killed five and wounded three enemy soldiers. While the hostile force concentrated fire on him, his platoon reached the cover of the crest. Second Lt. Craig was killed by enemy fire, but his intrepid action so inspired his men that they drove the enemy from the area, inflicting heavy casualties on the hostile force.

Corporal James E. Hill, a soldier present during the battle and eyewitness to Craig’s actions, later stated, “In a gesture typical of him, Lieutenant Craig put the safety of his men before his own.”

Lieutenant Craig's awards include:

Badge	Combat Infantryman Badge		
1st row	Medal of Honor		Bronze Star Medal
2nd row	Purple Heart	Army Good Conduct Medal	American Defense Service Medal
3rd row	American Campaign Medal	European–African–Middle Eastern Campaign Medal with 1 campaign star	World War II Victory Medal

== Posthumous honor ==
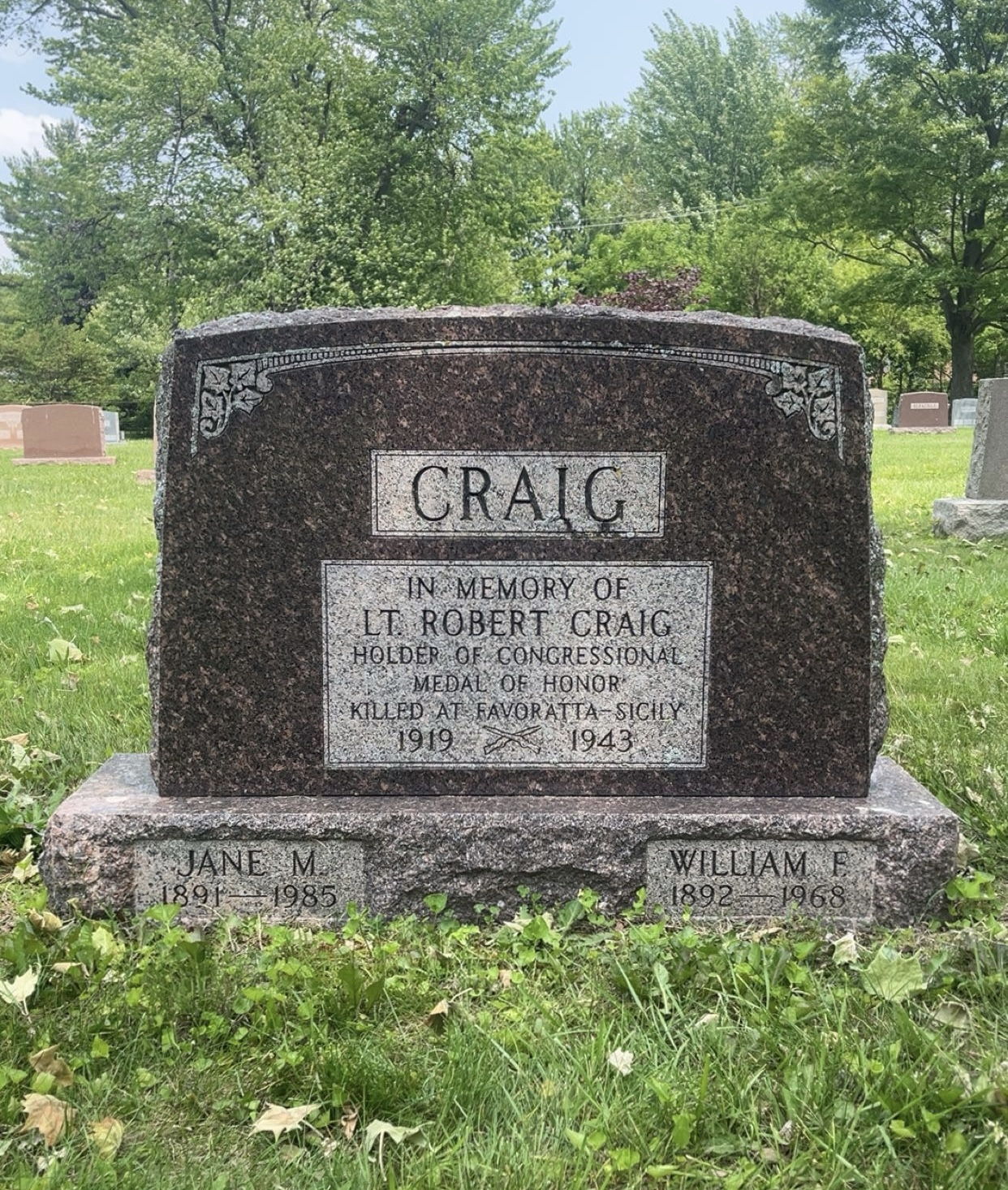
Robert Craig's grave

On May 26, 1944, Lt. Craig posthumously received the Medal of Honor for "conspicuous gallantry and intrepidity at the risk of life, above and beyond the call of duty." The medal was presented to Craig’s father, William, by Major General Alan W. Jones at Camp Atterbury-Muscatatuck. In addition to his father, his mother, brother, and sister were also present. Lt. Craig’s remains were transported back to Toledo, where he is buried at Toledo Memorial Park with his parents.

== Legacy ==
Robert Craig Memorial Bridge

On January 8, 1957, with a crowd of over 2,000, including his family, the Robert Craig Memorial Bridge was opened in his honor. The bascule bridge crossing the Maumee River carried Interstate 280 for nearly 50 years. Today, this bridge still exists as a local street, carrying Ohio State Route 65 across the Maumee River between North Summit Street and Front Street.

USNS Lt. Robert Craig

Originally launched as the SS Bowling Green Victory on August 28, 1945, the ship was used by the War Shipping Administration from September 1945 to July 1946, when it was acquired by the U.S. Army Transportation Service and renamed USAT Lt. Robert Craig in his honor. In 1950, it was acquired by the U.S. Navy becoming the USNS Lt. Robert Craig for the Military Sea Transportation Service. Between August 1950 and June 1973, she completed over 20 deployments to the Pacific, more than 36 transatlantic round trips, over 12 deployments to the Mediterranean, and numerous around-the-world trips. In addition to shipping supplies to American bases all over the world, the ship assisted in operations in Greenland, peacekeeping in Lebanon, logistics missions in the Red Sea, Persian Gulf, and Indian Ocean. She also assisted in U.S. nuclear weapons testing in the Marshall Islands during much of 1953, as well as support for U.S. forces during Vietnam.

== See also ==
- List of people from Toledo, Ohio
- List of Medal of Honor recipients
- List of foreign-born Medal of Honor recipients
- List of Medal of Honor recipients for World War II
