= Maumee =

Maumee may refer to:

Places:

- Maumee Township, Allen County, Indiana
- Maumee, Ohio, a city in Lucas County
- Maumee River, a river in northwestern Ohio and northeastern Indiana, United States
- Maumee Bay, Ohio, on Lake Erie
- Maumee State Forest, Ohio
- Maumee Bight, Ross Island, Antarctica
- Maumee Ice Piedmont, Marie Byrd Land, Antarctica
- Maumee Vallis, an ancient river valley on Mars
- Maumee Swamp, a swamp in Herkimer County, New York

Geology:

- Lake Maumee, the ancestor of present-day Lake Erie
- Maumee Torrent, the catastrophic draining of Glacial Lake Maumee

Ships:

- USS Maumee, four US Navy ships
- MV Maumee, a self-unloading motor vessel on the Great Lakes owned by the Lower Lakes Corporation, originally built in 1923 under the name MV Calcite II
- The Maumee class of U.S. Navy oilers

Other uses:

- Toledo Maumees, a 19th-century baseball team based in Toledo, Ohio

== See also ==
- Miami people
