= List of cities and towns along the Maumee River =

This is a list of cities and villages along the Maumee River in the United States.

== Alphabetically ==
- Antwerp, Ohio
- Defiance, Ohio
- Florida, Ohio
- Fort Wayne, Indiana
- Grand Rapids, Ohio
- Maumee, Ohio
- Napoleon, Ohio
- New Haven, Indiana
- Perrysburg, Ohio
- Rossford, Ohio
- Toledo, Ohio
- Waterville, Ohio

== Downstream, Fort Wayne to Toledo ==
- Fort Wayne, Indiana
- New Haven, Indiana
- Antwerp, Ohio
- Defiance, Ohio
- Florida, Ohio
- Napoleon, Ohio
- Grand Rapids, Ohio
- Waterville, Ohio
- Maumee, Ohio
- Perrysburg, Ohio
- Rossford, Ohio
- Toledo, Ohio

== By Population ==
- Toledo, Ohio
- Fort Wayne, Indiana
- Perrysburg, Ohio
- Defiance, Ohio
- Maumee, Ohio
- New Haven, Indiana
- Napoleon, Ohio
- Rossford, Ohio
- Waterville, Ohio
- Antwerp, Ohio
- Grand Rapids, Ohio
- Florida, Ohio
