= Robert Craig Memorial Bridge =

Craig Memorial Bridge
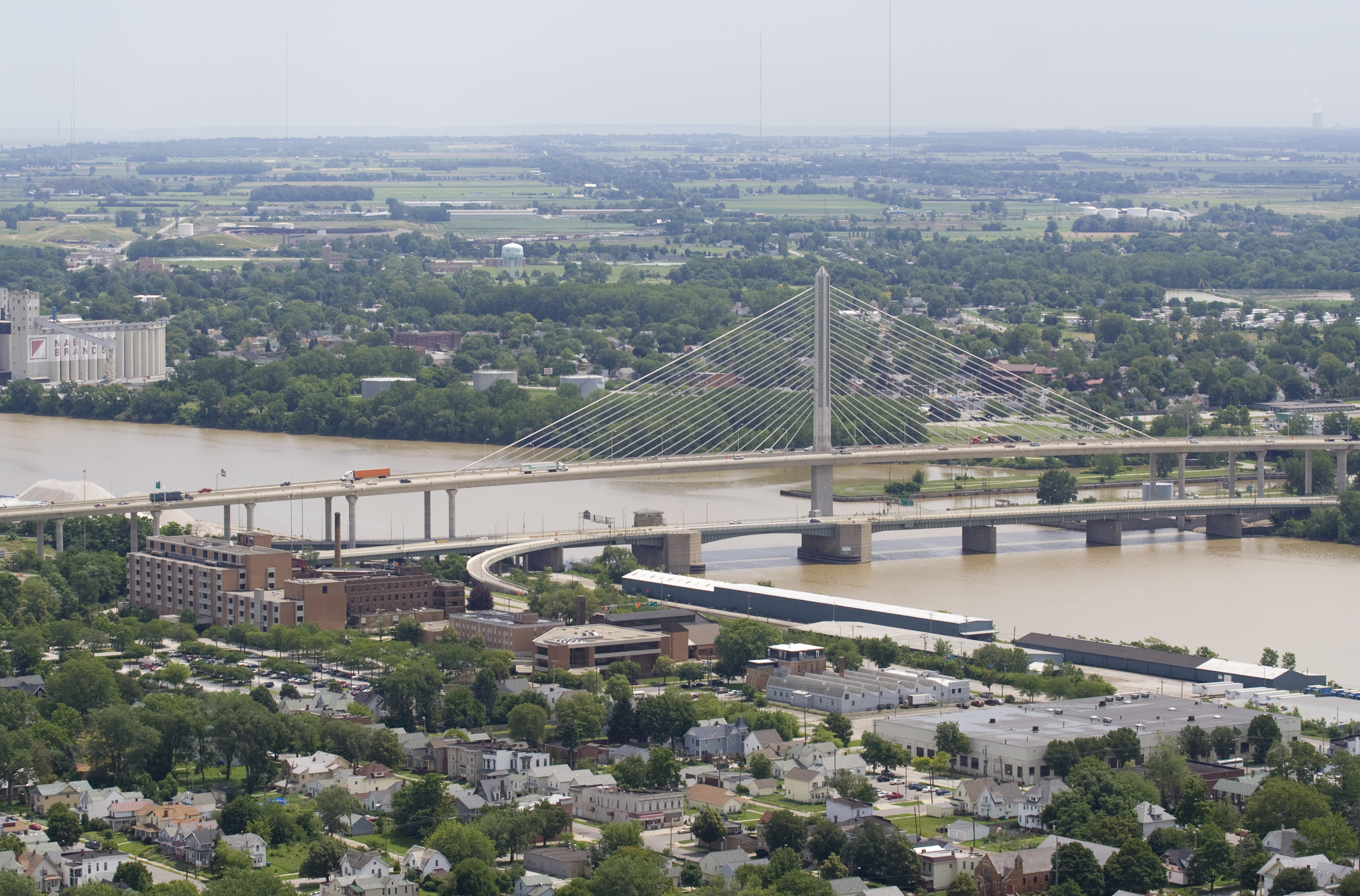
- The Craig Memorial Bridge in 2008 with the Veterans' Glass City Skyway in the background
- Coordinates: 41°40′N 83°31′W
- Carries: SR 65
- Crosses: Maumee River
- Locale: Toledo, Ohio

Characteristics
- Design: Bascule bridge

History
- Construction end: 1956
- Opened: 1957

The Robert Craig Memorial Bridge is a four-lane, double-leaf bascule bridge that spans the Maumee River approximately one mile downstream from downtown Toledo, Ohio. The bridge is named in memory of U.S. Army Second Lieutenant Robert Craig, a Scottish-born Toledoan who posthumously received the Medal of Honor during the Second World War.

Opening to traffic during January 1957, the Craig Memorial Bridge was notable as one of the few movable bridges on the Interstate Highway System as it carried Interstate 280 over the Maumee River shipping channel; it remained as such until the June 2007 completion of the Veterans' Glass City Skyway project. Since the re-routing of I-280, the bridge is now a local route—connecting Summit Street (on the west side of the river) to Front Street (on the east side). As such, the Craig Bridge has assumed the local role of its predecessor—an unnamed bridge that connected Ash Street to Consaul Street until its demolition following the opening of the Craig Bridge. Upon completion of the Glass City Skyway, State Route 65 was extended across the Craig Bridge from North Summit Street to Front Street.
