= Ohio State Route 280 =

State Route 280

Route information
- Maintained by ODOT

Location
- Country: United States
- State: Ohio

Highway system
- Ohio State Highway System; Interstate; US; State; Scenic
← I-280	→ SR 281

In Ohio, State Route 280 may refer to:

- Interstate 280 in Ohio, the only Ohio highway numbered 280 since about 1962
- Ohio State Route 280 (1930s-1960s), now SR 329 (Amesville to Trimble)
