= Veterans' Glass City Skyway =

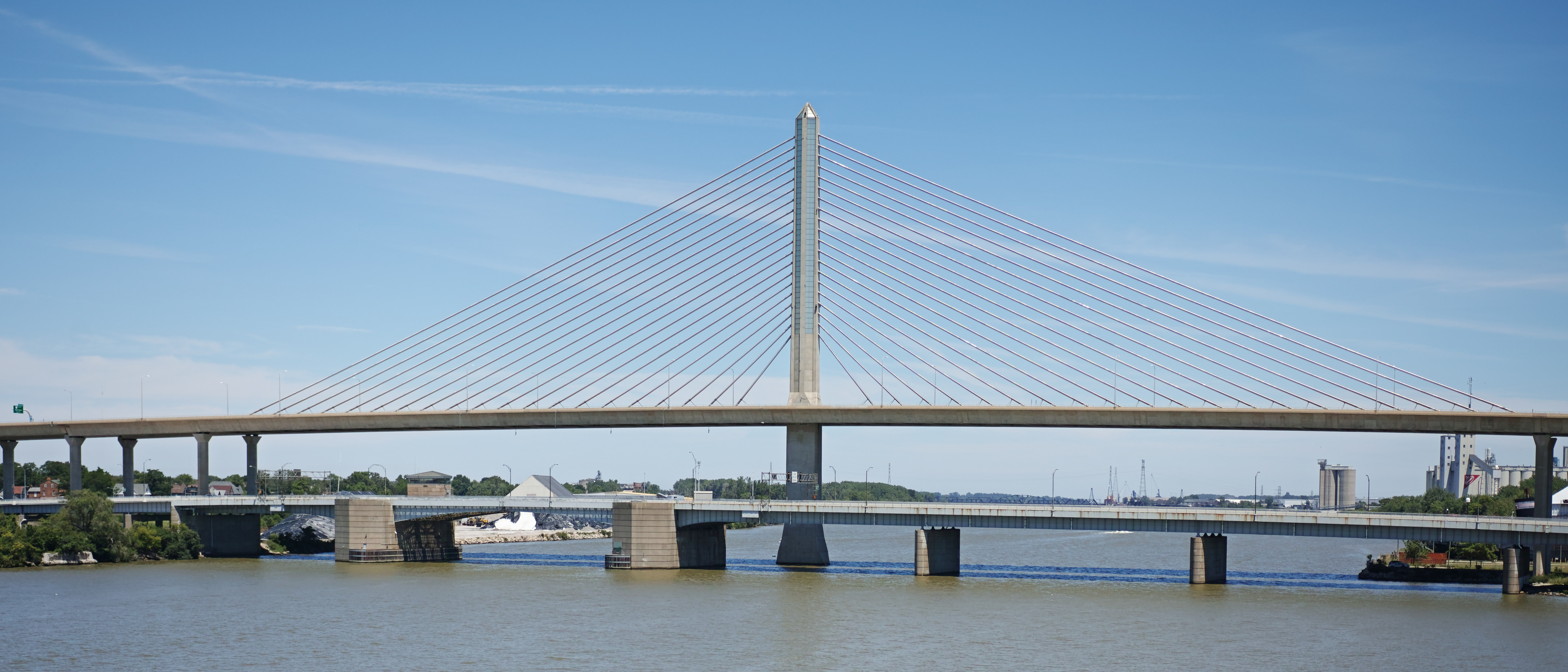
- Coordinates: 41°39′35″N 83°30′47″W
- Carries: 6 lanes of I-280
- Crosses: Maumee River
- Locale: Toledo, Ohio
- Official name: Veterans' Glass City Skyway
- Maintained by: Ohio Department of Transportation

Characteristics
- Design: cable-stayed bridge
- Total length: 8,800 feet (2,682 m)
- Height: 403.25 feet (123 m)
- Longest span: 612 feet (187 m) (2x)
- Clearance above: 130 feet (40 m)

History
- Opened: June 24, 2007; 18 years ago

Location
- Interactive map of Veterans' Glass City Skyway

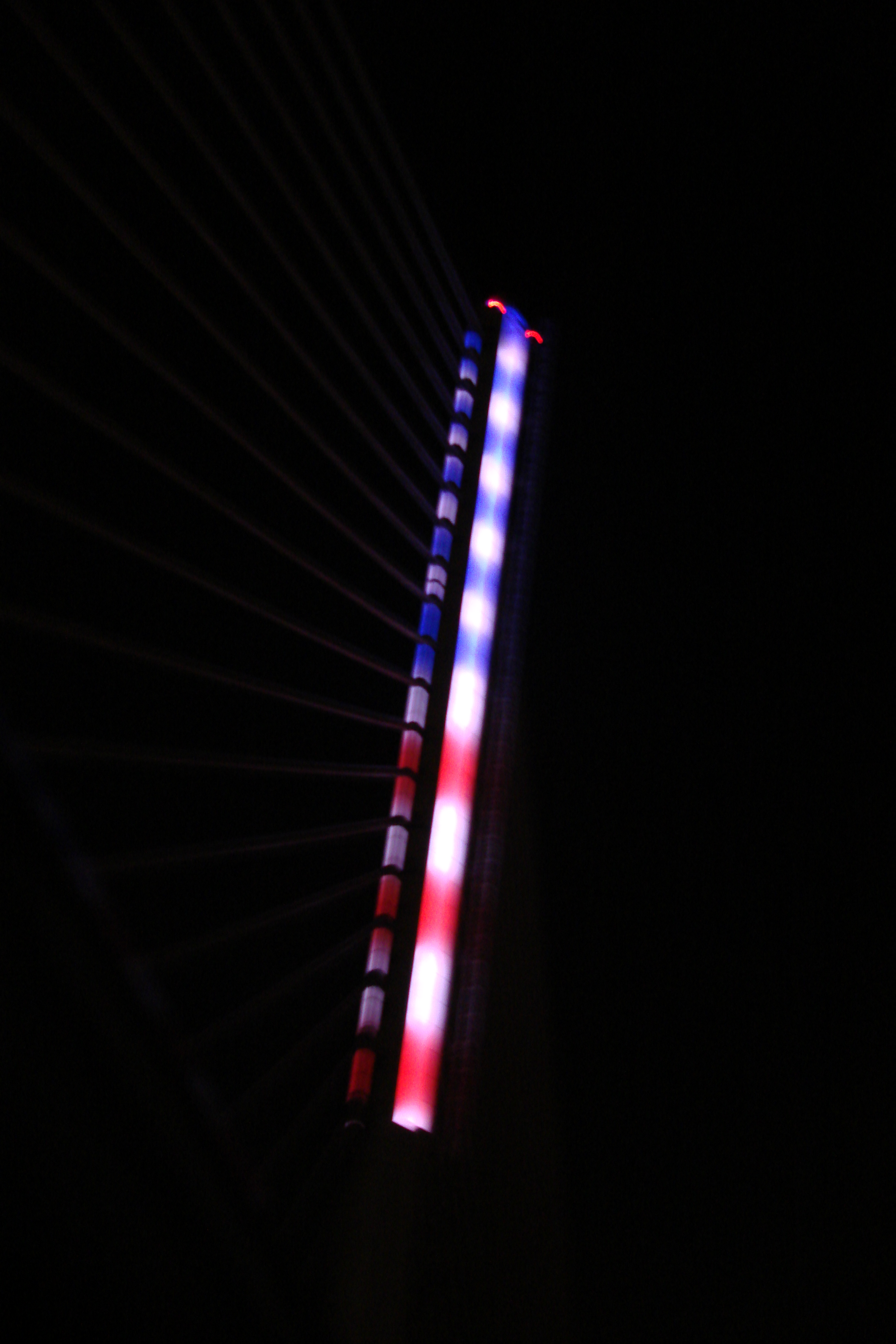
LED pylon lit up to resemble the American flag

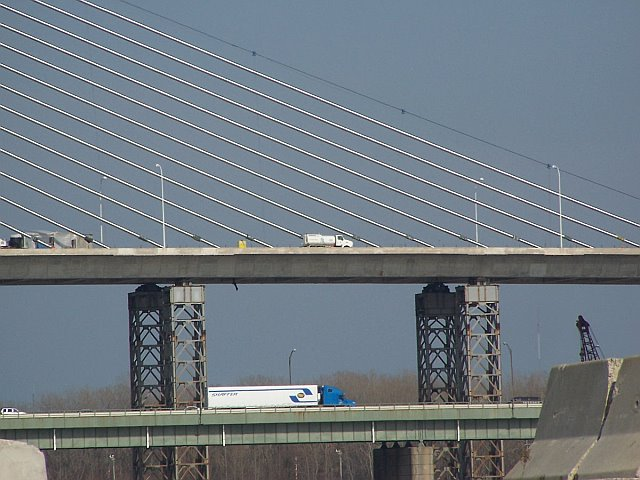
Photograph showing the difference between the Craig Bridge (lower) and the Toledo Skyway Bridge

The Veterans' Glass City Skyway, commonly called the Toledo Skyway Bridge, is a cable-stayed bridge on Interstate 280 in Toledo, Ohio. After many delays, it opened in 2007. The bridge has taken traffic and reduced delays on the Robert Craig Memorial Bridge, a bascule bridge that was, until its transfer to local control, one of the last moveable bridges on the Interstate highway system. The Skyway is Ohio Department of Transportation's (ODOT) biggest single construction project.

== Information ==
The ODOT and the city of Toledo began planning the bridge in April 1999. The project consisted of building an 8,800 feet (2,700 m) span across the Maumee River and low-lying land on its banks. The community selected a "glass" theme for the bridge design, choosing to honor the region's heritage in the glass manufacturing industry. The bridge was designed by FIGG Bridge Engineers, Inc. for ODOT.

Construction began in 2001. The main span over the Maumee River is a cable-stayed type bridge with a single pylon and two spans 612'-6" (200 m) on each side of the pylon. The main span approaches are about 4,000 feet (1,200 m) north of the river and 3,350 feet (1,020 m) south of the Maumee. The bridge opened to traffic on June 24, 2007.

The bridge carries three lanes of traffic in each direction. The road surface reaches a height of 130 feet (40 m) above the surface of the Maumee River. The bridge is the most expensive project ever undertaken by ODOT, costing about US$237 million.

The main attraction of the bridge is the single pylon which contains 384 light emitting diode (LED) fixtures that can create 16.7 million color combinations. The LEDs shine through the glass facing on all four sides of upper 196 feet of the main pylon. These lights can be visible up to 3 miles (4.8 km) away.

The bridge is one of two installations of a new cable-stayed cradle system that eliminates anchorages in the pylon by carrying the stays from anchorages in the bridge deck, through the pylon and back to anchorages in the deck. The cradle system provides many benefits during construction and over the 100+ year service life of the bridge. Each strand acts independently, allowing for the selective removal, inspection and replacement of the strands.

== Controversy ==
=== Naming ===
The supplanted Craig Bridge was named in memory of Second Lieutenant Robert Craig, World War II veteran and recipient of the Medal of Honor. Veterans' groups originally opposed any name that did not memorialize Lt. Craig. As a compromise, the name "Veterans' Glass City Skyway" was selected for the new bridge, honoring all veterans, while the Craig Bridge remains in place, carrying a rerouted State Route 65. While under construction, the bridge was generically referred to as the "Maumee River Crossing".

==== Suicide jumper ====
The sole known suicide from the bridge occurred on August 31, 2013, when a man crashed his car and leapt from the East Toledo side onto rocks of the Maumee River.

==== Falling ice ====
Ice sometimes falls from the cables, temporarily blocking lanes. This was anticipated during the design process, but deemed unlikely.

=== Construction accidents ===
==== Gantry crane collapse ====
The original timeline put the completion date in May 2006, but that became impossible when the gantry truss responsible for construction of the main span collapsed on February 16, 2004. The collapse killed four workers and injured four others. On top of that, main line production was all but halted for 16 months after the accident. Though two new cranes were quickly brought in, testing them took months and operations were slower than expected due to increased oversight of the project by OSHA following the accident.

==== Failure of work platform ====
About 9:15 a.m. on April 19, 2007, Andrew Burris of Curtice, Ohio, a member of United Brotherhood of Carpenters and Joiners of America Local 1138, died when the construction platform he was on became detached and fell from the bridge. The platform was anchored to the northbound side of the bridge, and broke off, falling about 95 feet to the ground, where the platform, still carrying Burris, landed on the east side of the roadway. Authorities from the Occupational Safety and Health Administration have not determined why the platform broke free from the bridge, and the Toledo Police Department does not suspect foul play.

"On behalf of Director Beasley and the Ohio Department of Transportation, we extend our deepest sympathy to the family of Andrew Burris," said ODOT District 2 director, Dave Dysard. "We also extend our condolences to his relatives, friends and his fellow workers who have made us proud through their commitment and dedication to their work. Andrew was a part of the team that took the pylon to the top back in 2005. For four-and-a-half years, he was an integral part of the team that worked to complete this vital link for our community."

Burris was from a line of carpenters, and kept a scrapbook of the project. His mother, Ruth, was quoted as saying "I think he felt closer to heaven there."
