= USNS Lt. Robert Craig =

Cargo ship of the United States Navy

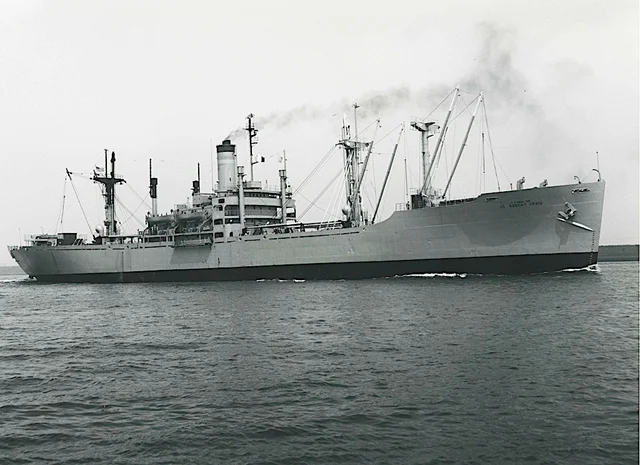
- USNS Lt. Robert Craig (T-AK-252)

History

United States
- Name: Bowling Green Victory; Lt. Robert Craig
- Namesake: Bowling Green, Florida or Bowling Green, Indiana or Bowling Green, Kentucky or Bowling Green, Maryland or Bowling Green, Missouri or Bowling Green, Ohio or Bowling Green, South Carolina or Bowling Green, Virginia; Lt. Robert Craig, awarded the Medal of Honor
- Ordered: as type (VC2-S-AP2) hull, MCV hull 811
- Builder: California Shipbuilding Corporation, Los Angeles, California
- Laid down: 21 June 1945, as SS Bowling Green Victory
- Launched: 28 August 1945
- Sponsored by: Mrs. C. M. Holladay
- Acquired: 9 August 1950
- Commissioned: 1946 as USAT Bowling Green Victory
- In service: 9 August 1950 as USNS LT. Robert Craig (T-AK-252)
- Out of service: 15 June 1973
- Renamed: USAT LT. Robert Craig, date unknown
- Stricken: 15 June 1973
- Identification: Hull symbol:T-AK-252
- Honors and awards: National Defense Service Medal
- Fate: Scrapped 1974

General characteristics
- Class & type: Boulder Victory-class cargo ship
- Displacement: 4,480 long tons (4,550 t) (standard); 15,580 long tons (15,830 t) (full load)
- Length: 455 ft (139 m)
- Beam: 62 ft (19 m)
- Draft: 29 ft 2 in (8.89 m)
- Installed power: 8,500 shp (6,300 kW)
- Propulsion: 1 × steam turbine; 1 × shaft
- Speed: 15.5 kn (17.8 mph; 28.7 km/h)
- Complement: 53 officers and enlisted

USNS Lt. Robert Craig (T-AK-252) was a Boulder Victory-class cargo ship built for the U.S. Maritime Commission during the final months of World War II.

She was acquired by the U.S. Army in 1946 and renamed USAT Lt. Robert Craig and served the Army until 1950 when she was acquired by the United States Navy. She served the Navy worldwide until 1973 when she was struck and sold.

== Victory built in California ==
Lt. Robert Craig (T AK 252) was laid down as Bowling Green Victory under Maritime Commission contract by California Shipbuilding Corporation, Los Angeles, California, 21 June 1945; launched 28 August 1945; sponsored by Mrs. C. M. Holladay; and delivered to her operator, J. H. Winchester & Company, 27 September 1945 by her owner War Shipping Administration. She was built as part of the Emergency Shipbuilding Program. J. H. Winchester & Company did post World War II work and then returned the Bowling Green Victory to the War Shipping Administration on 5 June 1946.

== U.S. Army service ==
She operated under the War Shipping Administration until July 1946 when she was transferred to the Army Transportation Service and renamed Lt. Robert Craig on 30 August 1946.

== U.S. Navy service ==
She was acquired by the Navy from the U.S. Maritime Commission 9 August 1950 and assigned to duty under the Military Sea Transportation Service (MSTS).

Crewed by civilians, Lt. Robert Craig steamed from New York City to the U.S. West Coast late in August and began Pacific Ocean supply runs out of San Francisco, California, 14 October. During the next 4 years, she made more than a score of deployments to American bases in the central and western Pacific Ocean, ranging from the Marshall Islands, the Mariana Islands and to the Philippine Islands, South Korea, and Japan. Throughout in much of 1953, she provided logistics support for the U.S. nuclear testing program in the Marshall Islands. During a deployment in the Far East between March and May 1954, she steamed to French Indochina carrying supplies for French forces fighting the Vietminh in Vietnam.

Lt. Robert Craig returned to the U.S. East Coast in mid-August and during the next month completed a roundtrip voyage out of New York City to Europe and back. Thence, she made a 3-month deployment via the west coast to the Far East and back. arriving New York 21 December to resume transatlantic supply runs.

Since 1954, Lt. Robert Craig maintained a busy and wide-ranging schedule of operations which has sent her over the major sealanes of the globe in support of far flung American naval and ground forces. She completed more than three dozen transatlantic roundtrips between east and Gulf Coast ports and European ports in Scandinavia, West Germany, the Netherlands, the United Kingdom, and France. In addition she operated in the North Atlantic from 1955 to 1964 while making numerous runs in support of military construction programs and operations along the coast of Greenland.

=== First Mediterranean deployment ===
Lt. Robert Craig made her first deployment to the Mediterranean between 25 March and 20 May 1956. Since that time she has completed more than a dozen such runs to that unsettled sea and has visited ports in North Africa, France, Italy, Turkey, Greece, and Lebanon. Following American intervention against Communist subversion in the troubled Middle East in 1958, she supported U.S. peacekeeping operations in Lebanon. In addition several of her Mediterranean cruises have sent her through the Suez Canal for additional logistics missions in the Red Sea, the Persian Gulf, and the Indian Ocean.

=== Worldwide operations ===
Lt. Robert Craig has alternated her busy Atlantic Ocean and Mediterranean service with more than a dozen deployments to American bases in the Pacific and the Far East. Operating out of New York, her supply missions have usually sent her via the Panama Canal and the west coast to ports in the Far East from Japan to Southeast Asia.

Between December 1961 and November 1964 she made two round the world cruises out of New York to the Far East and back. During the latter deployment, which lasted from 7 May to 18 November 1964, she visited ports in 17 European, Middle Eastern, and Asian nations from Denmark to South Vietnam, as well as U.S. bases in the Philippine Islands, Okinawa, and the Mariana Islands.

Following the increase of American military support in 1965 for the defense of South Vietnam, the ship provided increased logistics support for U.S. forces in Southeast Asia.

== Final inactivation ==
The vessel served the Navy until she was placed out of service and struck from the Navy List on 15 June 1973. She was sold for non-maritime use on 26 December 1973 and scrapped in 1974.

== Honors and awards ==
Qualified vessel personnel were authorized the following:

National Defense Service Medal
Vietnam Service Medal (1)
Republic of Vietnam Campaign Medal
