= Ohio State Route 65 =

State highway in western Ohio, US

State Route 65
- Route of SR 65 highlighted in red

Route information
- Maintained by ODOT
- Length: 115.84 mi (186.43 km)
- Existed: 1924–present

Major junctions
- South end: SR 47 near Sidney
- US 33 in Saint Johns; I-75 near Lima; US 30 in Cairo; US 224 / SR 15 in Ottawa; US 6 in McClure; US 20 / SR 25 in Perrysburg; I-75 in Toledo
- North end: I-280 in Toledo

Location
- Country: United States
- State: Ohio
- Counties: Shelby, Auglaize, Allen, Putnam, Henry, Wood, Lucas

Highway system
- Ohio State Highway System; Interstate; US; State; Scenic
| ← SR 64 | → SR 66 |

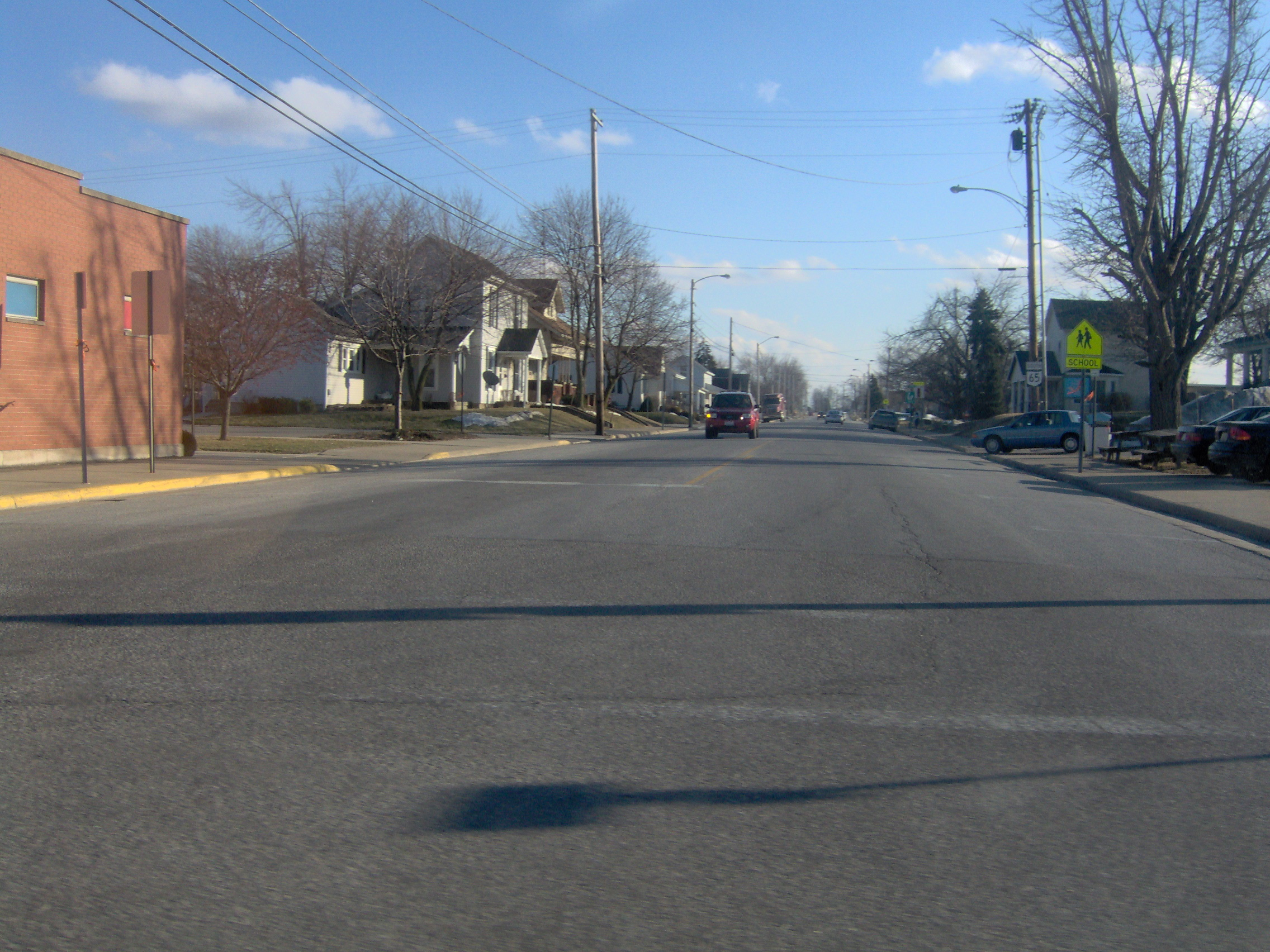
View along State Route 65 in Jackson Center, Shelby County.

State Route 65 (SR 65) is a north–south highway in western Ohio. Its southern terminus is at State Route 47 near Sidney, and its northern terminus is at its interchange with Interstate 280 in Toledo. From south to north, the route passes through the cities of Jackson Center, Uniopolis, Lima, Columbus Grove, Ottawa, Leipsic, Belmore, McClure, Grand Rapids, Perrysburg, Rossford, and Toledo.

Route 65 parallels the south bank of the Maumee River for its northernmost 32 miles, from east of Napoleon to Toledo.

== History ==
State Route 65 is an original state highway. Its original southern terminus was at State Route 15 in Ottawa, and it crossed the Maumee River near Liberty Center, continuing northward to Delta and terminating at the Michigan state line.

In 1931, the route's northern terminus was moved to downtown Toledo along its current route. Most of its former route north of the Maumee River is now that of State Route 109. From 1931 until 1989, State Route 65 did not cross the Maumee River. Until 1964, its route from Perrysburg to Toledo was superseded by U.S. Route 23.

In 1938, State Route 65's southern terminus was extended to its current terminus. It replaced the now defunct State Routes 33 and 318.

In 1989, when U.S. Route 223 was truncated back to Sylvania, State Route 65 was extended along its former route (along with State Route 51) across the Maumee on the Anthony Wayne Bridge. State Route 51 took U.S. Route 223's route on Monroe Street, while State Route 65 took the route of Summit Street from there to Interstate 280.

In June, 2007, the Veterans' Glass City Skyway opened, taking Interstate 280 across the Maumee. Subsequently, State Route 65 was rerouted onto the Robert Craig Memorial Bridge, the former crossing of Interstate 280 across the river, the week after the new bridge opened, ending at the former Front Street interchange.

== Major junctions ==
| County | Location | mi | km | Destinations | Notes |
|---|---|---|---|---|---|
| Shelby | Salem Township | 0.00 | 0.00 | SR 47 – Sidney, Bellefontaine | |
| Shelby | Jackson Township | 3.21 | 5.17 | SR 119 west to I-75 – Anna | Eastern terminus of SR 119 |
| Shelby | Jackson Center | 6.21 | 9.99 | SR 274 (Pike Street) | |
| Auglaize | Clay Township | 10.37 | 16.69 | SR 720 east / CR 100 (Santa Fe New Knoxville Road) | Western terminus of SR 720 |
| Auglaize | Clay–Union township line | 14.48 | 23.30 | US 33 east / Boundary Road – Lakeview | Southern end of US 33 concurrency |
| Auglaize | Clay–Union township line | 16.53 | 26.60 | US 33 / Walnut Street west – Wapakoneta | Northern end of US 33 concurrency |
| Auglaize | Uniopolis | 19.72 | 31.74 | SR 67 (Ohio Street) | |
| Allen | Lima–Perry Township municipal line | 26.37– 26.45 | 42.44– 42.57 | I-75 – Toledo, Dayton | Exit 122 (I-75) |
| Allen | Lima | 29.15 | 46.91 | SR 117 east / SR 309 east (Elm Street) / Pine Street | Southern end of SR 117 / SR 309 concurrencies |
| Allen | Lima | 29.37 | 47.27 | SR 117 west (Elm Street) / Union Street | Northern end of SR 117 concurrency |
| Allen | Lima | 29.75 | 47.88 | SR 81 east (North Street) / Union Street | Southern end of SR 81 concurrency |
| Allen | Lima | 29.94 | 48.18 | SR 81 west / SR 309 west (North Street) / Elizabeth Street | Northern end of SR 81 / SR 309 concurrencies |
| Allen | American–Bath township line | 33.81 | 54.41 | SR 115 north – Kalida | Southern terminus of SR 115 |
| Allen | Monroe Township | 35.73– 35.95 | 57.50– 57.86 | US 30 – Beaverdam, Delphos | Interchange |
| Putnam | Columbus Grove | 42.45 | 68.32 | SR 12 (Delphos Road) | |
| Putnam | Ottawa | 49.70 | 79.98 | US 224 / SR 15 east (Main Street) / SR 109 begins | Southern end of SR 15 / SR 109 concurencies |
| Putnam | Ottawa | 50.17 | 80.74 | SR 15 west (Defiance Street) / Taft Avenue | Northern end of SR 15 concurrency |
| Putnam | Ottawa | 50.45 | 81.19 | SR 109 north (Locust Street) | Northern end of SR 109 concurrency |
| Putnam | Leipsic | 57.52 | 92.57 | SR 613 (Main Street) | |
| Henry | Bartlow Township | 67.64 | 108.86 | SR 18 east – Deshler | Southern end of SR 18 concurrency |
| Henry | Bartlow Township | 68.52 | 110.27 | SR 18 west / CR E – Hamler | Northern end of SR 18 concurrency |
| Henry | Richfield Township | 72.54 | 116.74 | SR 281 – Defiance, Custar | |
| Henry | McClure | 78.59 | 126.48 | US 6 (North Street) | |
| Henry | Damascus Township | 81.61 | 131.34 | SR 110 west – Napoleon | Eastern terminus of SR 110 |
| Wood | Grand Rapids | 85.96 | 138.34 | SR 295 north / Bridge Street | Southern terminus of SR 295 |
| Wood | Washington Township | 90.60 | 145.81 | SR 235 south (Otsego Pike) – Weston, Hoytville, McComb | Northern terminus of SR 235 |
| Wood | Middleton Township | 93.28 | 150.12 | SR 582 east | Western terminus of SR 582 |
| Wood | Middleton Township | 96.14 | 154.72 | SR 64 south | Southern end of SR 64 concurrency |
| Wood | Middleton Township | 96.70 | 155.62 | SR 64 north – Waterville, Whitehouse | Northern end of SR 64 concurrency |
| Wood | Perrysburg | 102.43 | 164.85 | SR 25 south (West Boundary Street) / Indiana Avenue | Southern end of SR 25 concurrency |
| Wood | Perrysburg | 102.69 | 165.26 | US 20 west / SR 25 north / Front Street | Northern end of SR 25 concurrency; southern end of US 20 concurrency |
| Wood | Perrysburg | 103.36 | 166.34 | US 20 east (Louisiana Avenue) | Northern end of US 20 concurrency |
| Lucas | Toledo | 109.54– 109.72 | 176.29– 176.58 | I-75 – Dayton, Detroit | Exit 199 (I-75) |
| Lucas | Toledo | 111.61 | 179.62 | SR 2 east / SR 51 south (Woodville Road) / Oak Street | Southern end of SR 2 / SR 51 concurrencies |
| Lucas | Maumee River | | | Anthony Wayne Bridge | |
| Lucas | Toledo | 112.41 | 180.91 | SR 2 west (Summit Street) / Clayton Street | Northern end of SR 2 concurrency |
| Lucas | Toledo | 112.90 | 181.69 | SR 51 north (Monroe Street) | Northern end of SR 51 concurrency |
| Lucas | Toledo | 113.45 | 182.58 | SR 120 west (Cherry Street) | Eastern terminus of SR 120 |
| Lucas | Maumee River | | | Robert Craig Memorial Bridge | |
| Lucas | Toledo | 115.01– 115.84 | 185.09– 186.43 | I-280 / LECT / Front Street – Cleveland, Detroit | Exit 9 (I-280) |
1.000 mi = 1.609 km; 1.000 km = 0.621 mi: Concurrency terminus
