= Toledo Medical College =

Medical school in Toledo, Ohio, US

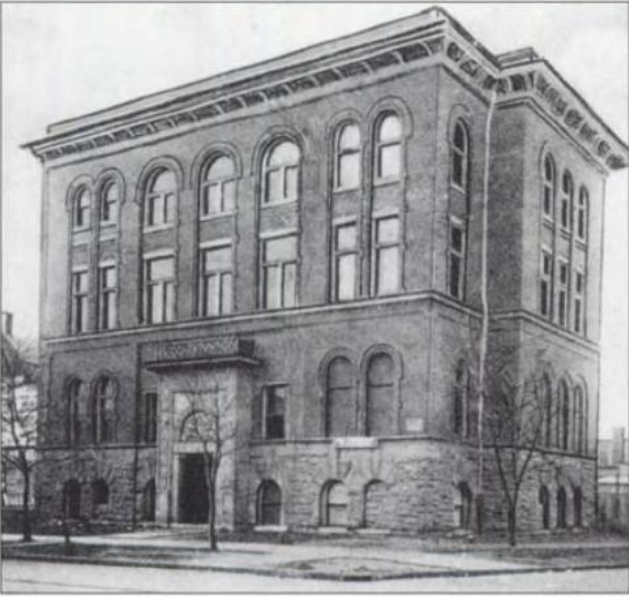
The College was built at the corner of Cherry and Page streets.

Toledo Medical College was a medical school in Toledo, Ohio, from 1882 to 1914. Eighteen local doctors each contributed $500 to set up the college. A building to house the College was built in 1896, at the corner of Cherry and Page streets, in 1896. Students were required to have a high school diploma, or to pass an entrance examination.

Prominent alumni of Toledo Medical College includes Leon S. Talaska, M.D., prominent humanitarian physician, notable for handling around 5,500 charity obstetrics and gynaecology cases without the loss of a single child or mother, for being the first physician of Polish descent in Toledo and being appointed City Physician.
