= Ohio State Route 420 =

State highway in Wood County, Ohio, US

State Route 420
- SR 420 highlighted in red

Route information
- Maintained by ODOT
- Length: 2.86 mi (4.60 km)
- Existed: 1969–present

Major junctions
- South end: US 20 / US 23 near Stony Ridge
- SR 163
- North end: I-80 / I-90 / Ohio Turnpike / I-280 near Millbury

Location
- Country: United States
- State: Ohio
- Counties: Wood

Highway system
- Ohio State Highway System; Interstate; US; State; Scenic
← SR 416	→ SR 421

State Route 420 (SR 420) is a north–south state highway in the northwestern portion of the U.S. state of Ohio. The southern terminus of this four-lane divided highway is at a trumpet interchange with U.S. Route 20/US 23 (US 20/US 23) approximately 3.25 miles (5.23 km) northeast of the village of Luckey. The route’s northern terminus is at the southern terminus of Interstate 280 (I-280), where the two routes meet the Ohio Turnpike (I-80/I-90) at a double-trumpet interchange nearly four miles (6.4 km) southwest of Millbury. SR 420 made its debut in the late 1960s. It is a major route whose primary purpose is to link US 20/US 23 with I-280 and the Ohio Turnpike.

== Route description ==
For its entire length, SR 420 is a four-lane divided highway, with access provided only at three intersections along the way, and two interchanges, one at either end of the highway. There is no driveway access at any point along SR 420.

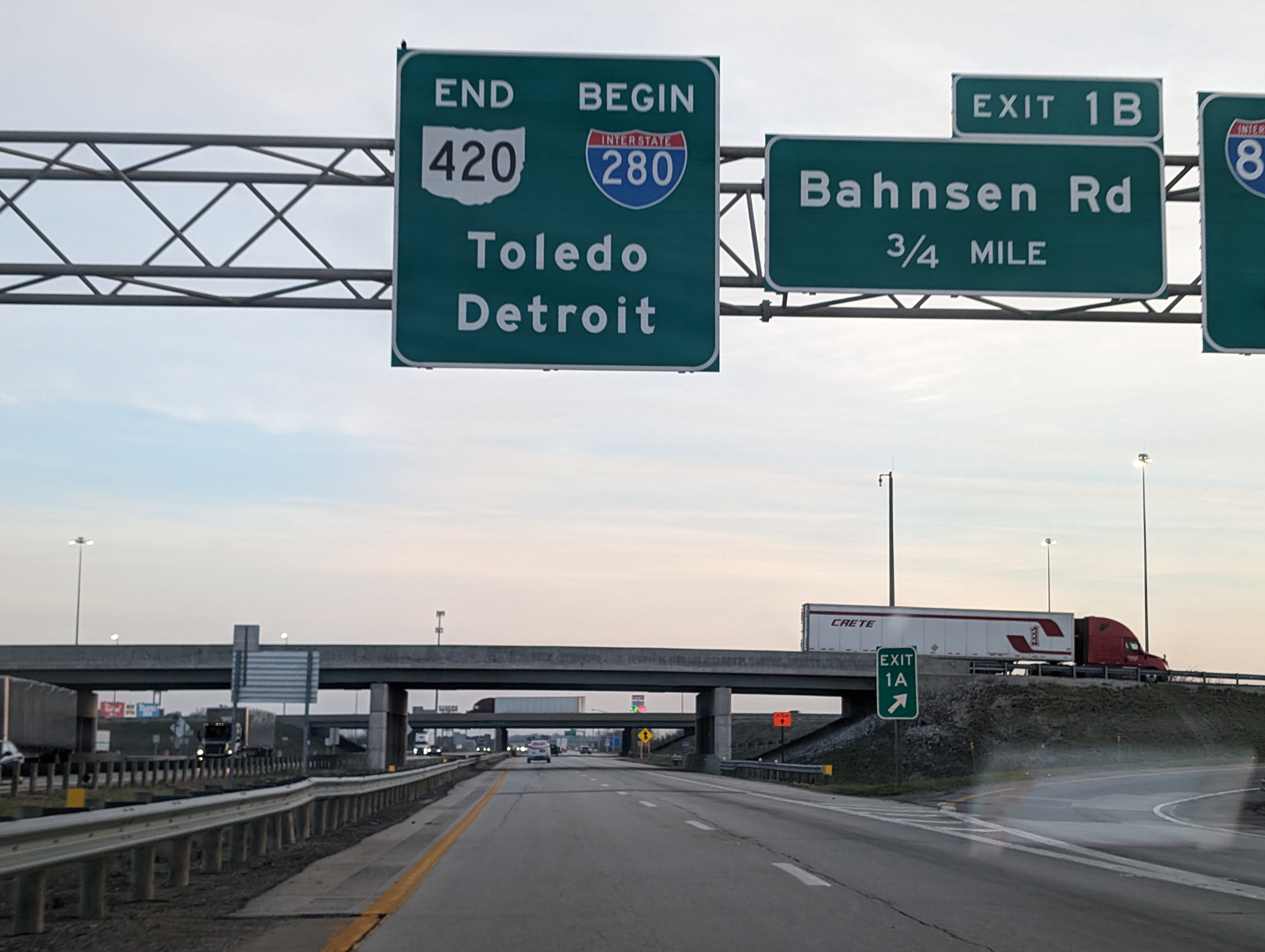
SR 420 transitions into I-280 north of the Ohio Turnpike.

Located entirely in the northeastern portion of Wood County, SR 420 begins at a trumpet interchange with the US 20/US 23 in Troy Township and heads due north from that point. The first portion of the highway is abutted by a neighborhood of mobile homes on the west side, and a blend of woods and open field on the east side. After intersecting Truman Road, SR 420 has farmland meeting it on both sides. It then meets SR 163 and crosses into Lake Township. Continuing north, SR 420 soon passes into the midst of multiple truck stops as it approaches the Ohio Turnpike. The highway connects to these truck stops via a signalized intersection with Libbey Road. Immediately north of this intersection, SR 420 comes to an end as it arrives at the double-trumpet interchange that connects the route with the Ohio Turnpike, I-80/I-90. As SR 420 terminates, I-280 begins its northerly trek to Toledo and points north.

Consequential to its function as a major connector route, the entire length of SR 420 is included within the National Highway System.

== History ==
The SR 420 designation was established in 1969. It was applied to what was formerly a portion of SR 120 prior to its eastern terminus being moved back to Toledo. SR 120 had formerly overlapped I-280, and then continued solo south of the Ohio Turnpike before ending at US 20/US 23.

In the fall of 2006, a new trumpet interchange was completed to facilitate traffic movement through the southern terminus of SR 420 where it meets the US 20/US 23 duplex.

== Major intersections ==
The entire route is in Wood County.

Location	mi	km	Exit	Destinations	Notes
Troy Township	0.00	0.00	1	US 20 / US 23 (Fremont Pike) – Fremont, Perrysburg	Trumpet interchange; exit 81A on US 20/US 23
Troy–Lake township line	2.10	3.38		SR 163 (Genoa Road) – Genoa, Stony Ridge	
Lake Township	2.86	4.60		I-80 / I-90 / Ohio Turnpike – Cleveland, Chicago I-280 north – Toledo, Detroit	Double–trumpet interchange; roadway continues north as I-280; exit 1A on I-280; exit 71 on Ohio Turnpike
1.000 mi = 1.609 km; 1.000 km = 0.621 mi
