= Florida, Ohio =

- Village
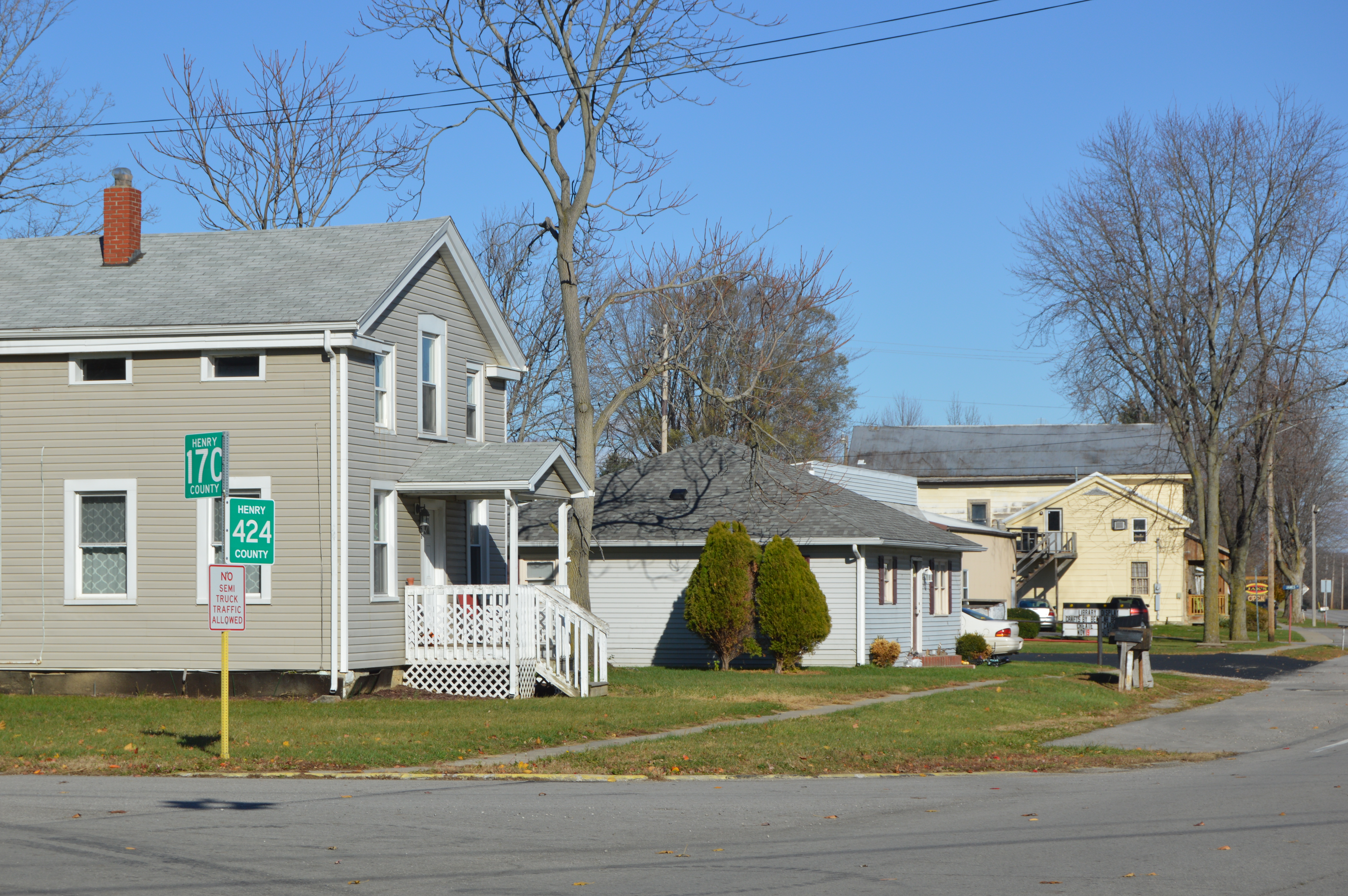
- High Street east of Henry Street

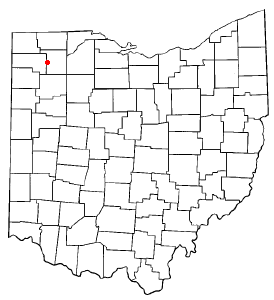
- Location of Florida, Ohio

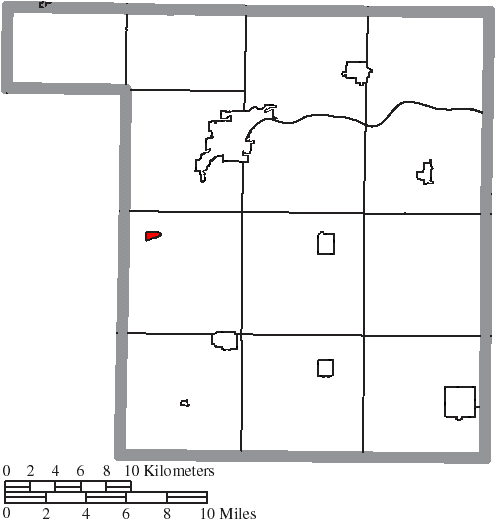
- Location of Florida in Henry County
- Coordinates: 41°19′26″N 84°12′01″W
- Country: United States
- State: Ohio
- County: Henry

Area
  - Total: 0.22 sq mi (0.58 km^{2})
  - Land: 0.22 sq mi (0.58 km^{2})
  - Water: 0 sq mi (0.00 km^{2})
- Elevation: 669 ft (204 m)

Population (2020)
  - Total: 215
  - Estimate (2023): 213
  - Density: 956.0/sq mi (369.12/km^{2})
- Time zone: UTC-5 (Eastern (EST))
  - Summer (DST): UTC-4 (EDT)
- FIPS code: 39-27538
- GNIS feature ID: 2398887

Florida is a village in Henry County, Ohio, United States, along the Maumee River. The population was 215 at the 2020 census.

== History ==
Prior to European settlement Florida was the site of American Indian villages. The most notable village site was called Snake Town, established in 1792 and named after the Shawnee leader Snake (or Peteusha). Snake Town was located along the Maumee River and was at one time home to the war chief Blue Jacket of the Shawnee, white chief Simon Girty, and trader James Girty. A trading post operated by James Girty was located on the northern bank of the Maumee River across from Girty's Island.

Florida officially began in the 1843 when the Miami and Erie Canal was extended to that point connecting it to Independence and Defiance. During the canal era and pre Civil War Florida became a stop on the Underground Railroad. The Newell House was a known stop where runaway African American slaves hid. From the Newell House African Americans made their way to Ridgeville Corners or Maumee, Ohio. The village was named after the state of Florida. A post office was established at Florida in 1843, and remained in operation until 1919.

== Geography ==
According to the United States Census Bureau, the village has a total area of 0.23 square miles (0.60 km^{2}), all land.

== Demographics ==
Historical population
Census	Pop.	Note	%±
1880	245		—
1890	288		17.6%
1900	276		−4.2%
1910	234		−15.2%
1920	159		−32.1%
1930	173		8.8%
1940	216		24.9%
1950	227		5.1%
1960	290		27.8%
1970	285		−1.7%
1980	294		3.2%
1990	304		3.4%
2000	246		−19.1%
2010	232		−5.7%
2020	215		−7.3%
2023 (est.)	213	▼	−0.9%
U.S. Decennial Census

=== 2010 census ===
As of the census of 2010, there were 232 people, 94 households, and 67 families residing in the village. The population density was 1,008.7 inhabitants per square mile (389.5/km^{2}). There were 106 housing units at an average density of 460.9 per square mile (178.0/km^{2}). The racial makeup of the village was 96.6% White, 0.4% Asian, 1.7% from other races, and 1.3% from two or more races. Hispanic or Latino of any race were 6.0% of the population.

There were 94 households, of which 29.8% had children under the age of 18 living with them, 58.5% were married couples living together, 7.4% had a female householder with no husband present, 5.3% had a male householder with no wife present, and 28.7% were non-families. 23.4% of all households were made up of individuals, and 12.8% had someone living alone who was 65 years of age or older. The average household size was 2.47 and the average family size was 2.88.

The median age in the village was 42.7 years. 22.8% of residents were under the age of 18; 7.8% were between the ages of 18 and 24; 23.6% were from 25 to 44; 26.2% were from 45 to 64; and 19.4% were 65 years of age or older. The gender makeup of the village was 46.1% male and 53.9% female.

=== 2000 census ===
As of the census of 2000, there were 246 people, 98 households, and 76 families residing in the village. The population density was 1,082.5 inhabitants per square mile (418.0/km^{2}). There were 107 housing units at an average density of 470.8 per square mile (181.8/km^{2}). The racial makeup of the village was 95.93% White, 0.41% Asian, 2.85% from other races, and 0.81% from two or more races. Hispanic or Latino of any race were 6.50% of the population.

There were 98 households, out of which 32.7% had children under the age of 18 living with them, 63.3% were married couples living together, 13.3% had a female householder with no husband present, and 22.4% were non-families. 19.4% of all households were made up of individuals, and 8.2% had someone living alone who was 65 years of age or older. The average household size was 2.51 and the average family size was 2.83.

In the village, the population was spread out, with 24.8% under the age of 18, 7.3% from 18 to 24, 28.5% from 25 to 44, 24.4% from 45 to 64, and 15.0% who were 65 years of age or older. The median age was 39 years. For every 100 females there were 93.7 males. For every 100 females age 18 and over, there were 90.7 males.

The median income for a household in the village was $39,583, and the median income for a family was $44,375. Males had a median income of $30,208 versus $21,667 for females. The per capita income for the village was $16,094. About 6.7% of families and 9.0% of the population were below the poverty line, including 15.5% of those under the age of eighteen and none of those 65 or over.

== Education ==
Public education for the village is administered by the Napoleon Area City School District.

Florida has a public library, a branch of the Napoleon Public Library.
