= USS Maumee =

USS Maumee or USNS Maumee has been the name of four ships in the United States Navy. These ships are named for the Maumee River, which flows from Indiana through Ohio to empty into Lake Erie at Toledo.

- USS Maumee (1863), a 593-ton screw steam gunboat in commission from 1864 to 1865
- USS Maumee (AO-2), an oiler in commission from 1916 to 1922 and from 1942 to 1946
- USS Maumee (ID-1339), a collier commissioned in 1918
- USNS Maumee (T-AO-149), a U.S. Navy fleet oiler in non-commissioned service with the Military Sea Transportation Service and Military Sealift Command from 1956 until the 1980s.

== See also ==
- Maumee-class oiler
