= Interstate 280 (Ohio) =

Interstate Highway in Ohio

Interstate 280
- I-280 highlighted in red

Route information
- Auxiliary route of I-80
- Maintained by ODOT
- Length: 12.41 mi (19.97 km)
- Existed: 1959–present
- NHS: Entire route

Major junctions
- South end: I-80 / I-90 / Ohio Turnpike / SR 420 in Lake Township
- SR 51 / SR 611 in Northwood; SR 2 in Oregon; SR 65 in Toledo; SR 25 in Toledo
- North end: I-75 in Toledo

Location
- Country: United States
- State: Ohio
- Counties: Wood, Lucas

Highway system
- Interstate Highway System; Main; Auxiliary; Suffixed; Business; Future; Ohio State Highway System; Interstate; US; State; Scenic
← SR 279	→ SR 280

Interstate 280 (I-280) is a 12.41-mile-long (19.97 km) auxiliary Interstate Highway in Ohio that connects I-75 in northeast Toledo with I-80/I-90 (part of the Ohio Turnpike) southeast of the city in northeastern Wood County. Built between 1955 and 1959, the route was originally part of the Detroit–Toledo Expressway. Although first designated in 1959, the highway originally contained several at-grade intersections and other features which left it substandard to the Interstate Highway System until 1990. Further construction in 2007 built a new crossing of the Maumee River, replacing an outdated drawbridge. The highway serves as an easterly bypass of the Toledo metropolitan area, passing through the communities of Northwood and Oregon. It is one of two auxiliary Interstate Highways serving Toledo, the other being I-475.

== Route description ==
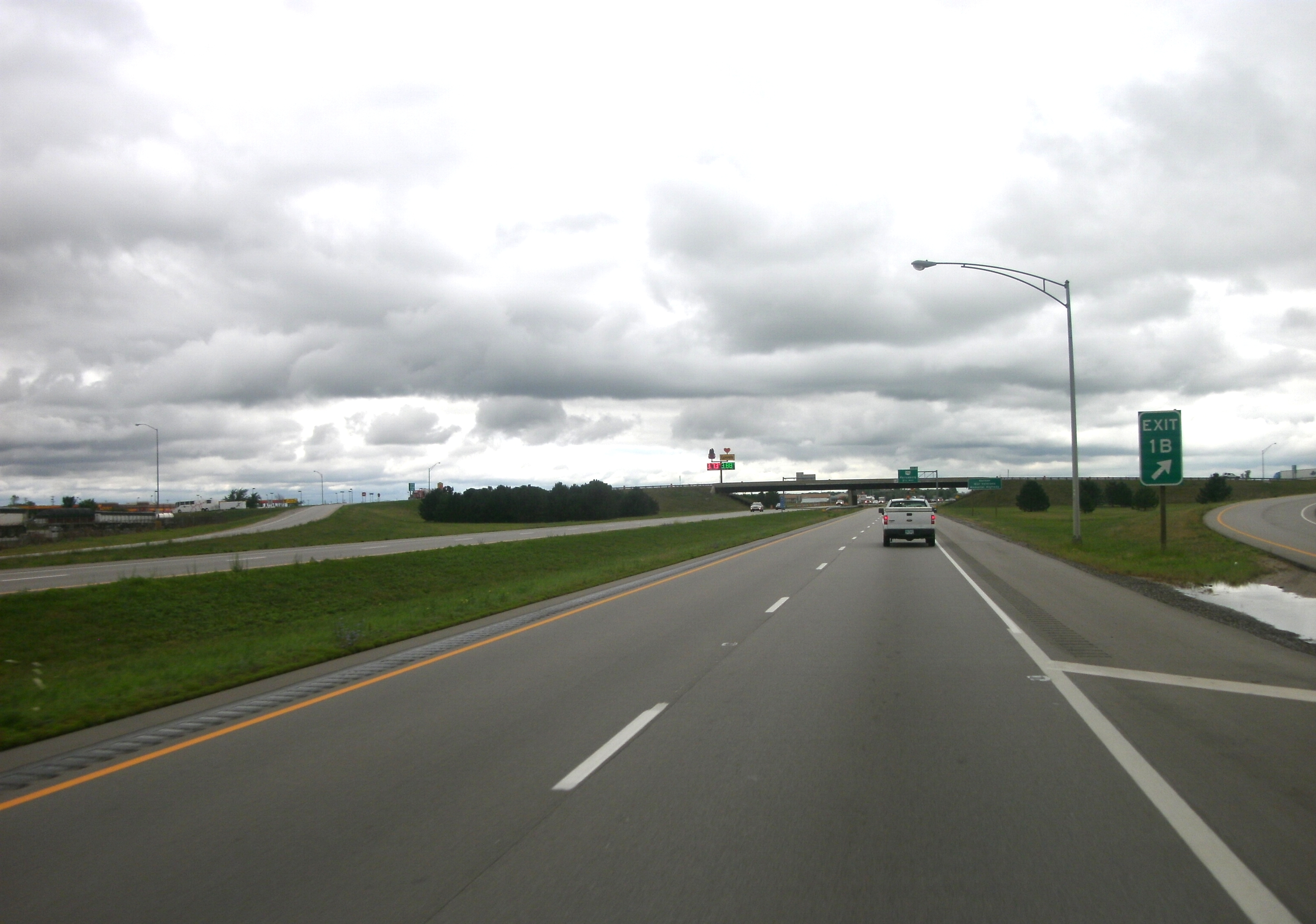
I-280 northbound at exit 1B (Bahnsen Road) in Lake Township

The southern end of I-280 is an interchange in Wood County with exit 71 along the Ohio Turnpike, which carries I-80 and I-90 at this point. South of this interchange, the I-280 freeway transitions to State Route 420 (SR 420), a divided highway without access control, that also provides access to a truck stop and other businesses. Continuing north, I-280 runs through farmland and through an interchange with Bahnsen Road, which also provides access to other motorist- and trucking-related businesses and access to Latcha and Hanley roads. North of the SR 795 interchange, the freeway turns to the northwest. At the Walbridge Road interchange in Walbridge, I-280 turns back due north. On either side of the Interstate, the surroundings transition from farms to residential subdivisions. I-280 crosses a major Norfolk Southern Railway railroad line also used by the Floridian and Lake Shore Limited passenger train routes operated by Amtrak. North of this crossing, the freeway passes into Lucas County. I-280 turns northwesterly again in the city of Oregon. This area is suburban residential neighborhoods as the freeway approaches the Maumee River. The Interstate crosses the river on the Veterans' Glass City Skyway, an 8,800-foot (2,700 m), cable-stayed bridge. On the opposite bank of the river, I-280 turns northward and passes through an interchange with SR 25. There is one final interchange with I-75 where I-280 terminates.

== History ==
The highway that would eventually carry I-280, the Detroit–Toledo Expressway, opened as a relocated SR 120 between US Route 20 (US 20) and SR 51 by 1955. The highway was extended to Summit Street in Toledo by 1957 and, by 1959, was extended into Michigan. By this time, the I-280 designation had been added, but the portion carrying I-280 was not fully converted to Interstate standards until 1990.

Initially, the freeway had several at-grade intersections with crossroads: Hanley and Latcha roads near Millbury; Ayers, Lemoyne, and Walbridge roads near Walbridge; and Curtice Road in Northwood. The Walbridge intersection was later upgraded to a traffic signal, one of the few on the Interstate Highway System at the time, while the intersection underwent study for conversion to an interchange. Hanley and Latcha roads were truncated to dead-end just before the freeway, but access to both roads was retained by construction of a new interchange and service drives in the early 1970s; the Ayers and Lemoyne crossings were also upgraded to overpasses at this point. The removal of direct access to Hanley and Latcha was originally disputed by business owners who owned motels and gas stations along those roads. The crossing at Curtice Road was upgraded to an interchange concurrently with the upgrade of the nearby interchange with Woodville Road.

Originally, I-280 was carried across the Maumee River by the Robert Craig Memorial Bridge, a drawbridge that frequently caused backups along the route. In addition, a ramp leading from northbound Summit Street to southbound I-280 merged directly onto the bridge with no acceleration room, so it was removed in the mid-1990s. On June 24, 2007, the Veterans' Glass City Skyway opened, replacing the drawbridge. After the Glass City Skyway opened, the Craig Bridge was reconstructed, and it now carries SR 65. Its construction also led to the reconstruction of the Front Street exit and removal of the Summit Street interchange entirely; access from I-280 to Summit Street is now provided by the Front Street exit and the Craig Bridge.

== Exit list ==
County	Location	mi	km	Old exit	New exit	Destinations	Notes
Wood	Lake Township	0.000– 0.254	0.000– 0.409		1A	I-80 / I-90 / Ohio Turnpike – Cleveland, Chicago SR 420 south – Stony Ridge	Southern terminus; Ohio Turnpike exit 71; roadway continues southward as SR 420
Wood	Lake Township	0.724	1.165		1B	Bahnsen Road	To Hanley and Latcha Roads
Wood	Lake Township	2.296	3.695	1	2	SR 795 – Perrysburg	
Wood	Walbridge	4.525	7.282		4	Walbridge	
Wood	Northwood	6.065– 6.475	9.761– 10.421	2	6	SR 51 (Woodville Road) / Curtice Road	Signed as 6A (SR 51) and 6B (Curtice Road) on semi-directional ramps; Curtice Road interchange added to existing Woodville Road interchange c. 1991
Lucas	Oregon	7.853– 8.243	12.638– 13.266	3	7	SR 2 / LECT – Oregon	Northbound access via Wheeling Street
Lucas	Toledo	8.833	14.215	4	8	Starr Avenue	Southbound exit and northbound entrance; northbound exit and southbound entrance removed c. 1974
Lucas	Toledo	9.873	15.889	5	9	SR 65 (Front Street) / Summit Street	SR 65 crosses the Maumee River on the Robert Craig Memorial Bridge to connect to Summit Street
Lucas	Maumee River	9.453– 11.193	15.213– 18.013	Veterans' Glass City Skyway			
Lucas	Toledo	10.463	16.839	6	10	Summit Street	Southbound entrance from northbound Summit Street removed late 1990s; rest of exit replaced by Craig Memorial Bridge connections from exit 9 in 2007; originally Exit 10A before removal of exits 10B and 10C
Lucas	Toledo	10.543	16.967		10B	Huron Street	Former exit with no southbound entrance; northbound exit was via 10A and northbound entrance was via Erie Street; northbound exit removed before rest of exit was removed in 1999
Lucas	Toledo	10.863	17.482	7	10C	Michigan Street	Former northbound exit and southbound entrance via Champlain Street; exit removed 1999
Lucas	Toledo	11.223	18.062		11	SR 25 south – Downtown Toledo	Northbound exit connects to Galena Street; northern terminus of SR 25
Lucas	Toledo	11.523	18.544	8	11	Central Avenue	Former diamond interchange, eliminated c. 1987; northbound exit and southbound entrance were eliminated before southbound exit and northbound entrance
Lucas	Toledo	12.103	19.478	9	12	Manhattan Boulevard	No access from Manhattan Boulevard to southbound I-75 or northbound I-75 to Manhattan Boulevard
Lucas	Toledo	12.383	19.929		13	I-75 / LECT – Detroit	Northern terminus; no control city for southbound I-75; exit 208 on I-75
1.000 mi = 1.609 km; 1.000 km = 0.621 mi: Closed/former; Incomplete access; Tolled
