= Maumee River =

River in Indiana and Ohio, United States

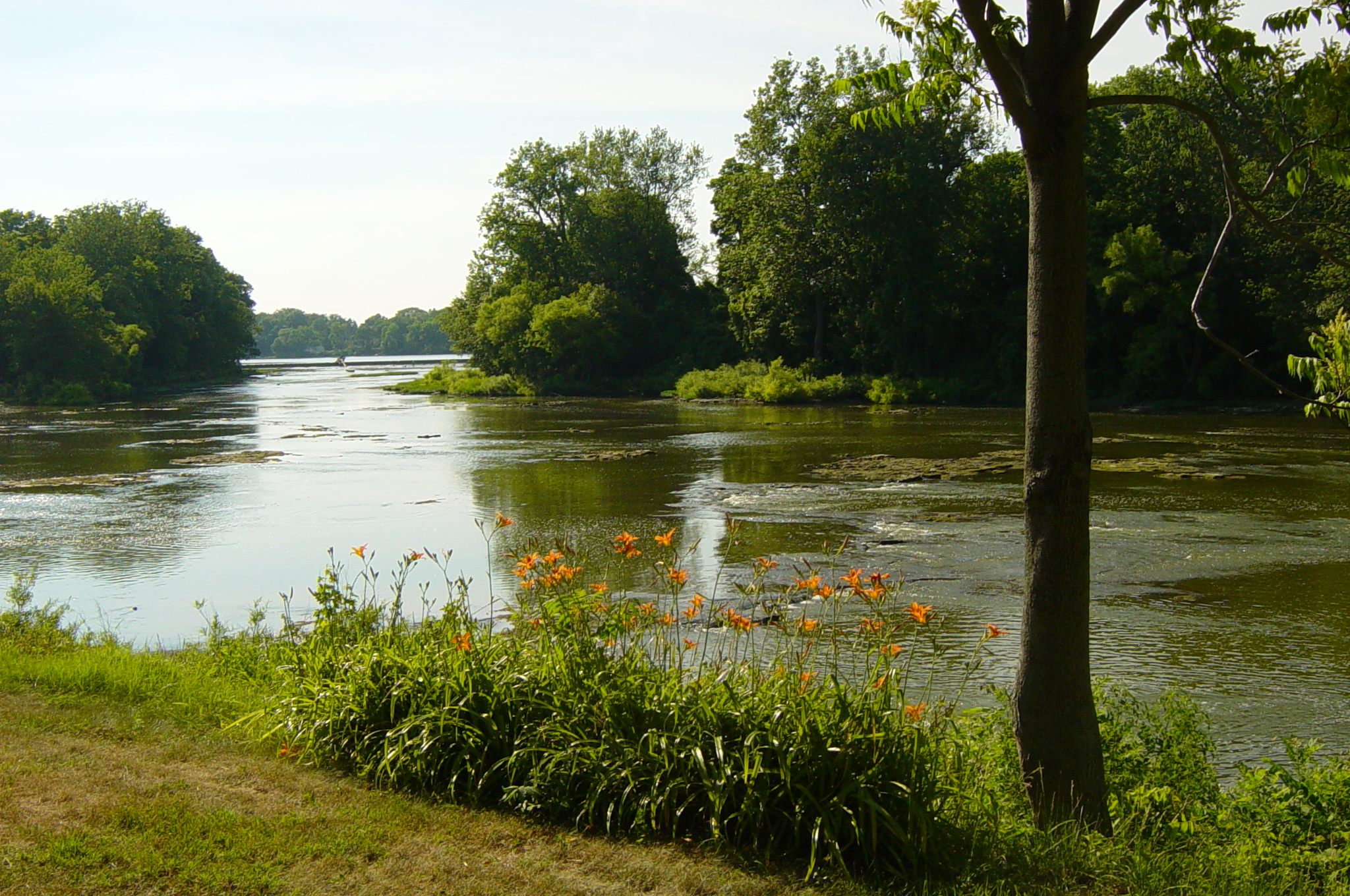
- The Maumee River at Grand Rapids, Ohio

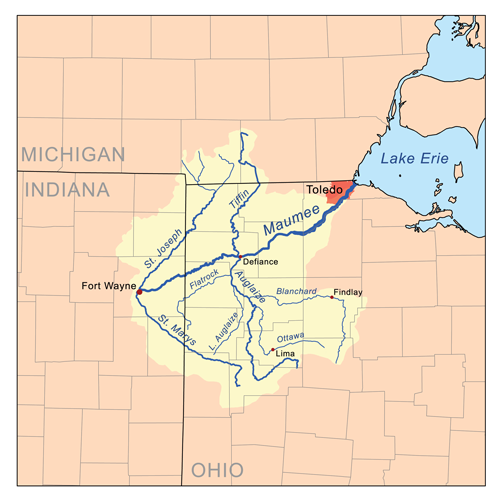
- Map of the Maumee River watershed

Location
- Country: United States
- States: Indiana, Ohio
- Cities and towns: Fort Wayne, Indiana; New Haven, Indiana; Antwerp, Ohio; Cecil, Ohio; Defiance, Ohio; Florida, Ohio; Napoleon, Ohio; Grand Rapids, Ohio; Waterville, Ohio; Maumee, Ohio; Perrysburg, Ohio; Rossford, Ohio; Toledo, Ohio; Oregon, Ohio

Physical characteristics
- Source
  - location: Fort Wayne by the confluence of the St. Joseph and St. Marys
  - coordinates: 41°04′58″N 85°07′56″W
  - elevation: 750 ft (230 m)
- Mouth
  - location: Lake Erie at Toledo
  - coordinates: 41°41′58″N 83°27′36″W
  - elevation: 571 ft (174 m)
- Length: 137 miles (220 km)
- Basin size: 6,354 sq mi (16,460 km^{2})
- Discharge
  - average: 5,297 cu ft/s (150.0 m^{3}/s)

Basin features
- Progression: Northeast

The Maumee River (pronounced /mɔːˈmiː/) (Shawnee: Hotaawathiipi; Miami-Illinois: Taawaawa siipiiwi) is a river running in the Midwestern United States from northeastern Indiana into northwestern Ohio and Lake Erie. It is formed at the confluence of the St. Joseph and St. Marys rivers, where Fort Wayne, Indiana has developed, and meanders northeastwardly for 137 miles (220 km) through an agricultural region of glacial moraines before flowing into the Maumee Bay of Lake Erie. The city of Toledo is located at the mouth of the Maumee. The Maumee was designated an Ohio State Scenic River on July 18, 1974. The Maumee watershed is Ohio's breadbasket; it is two-thirds farmland, mostly corn and soybeans. It is the largest watershed of any of the rivers feeding the Great Lakes, and supplies five percent of Lake Erie's water.

== History ==
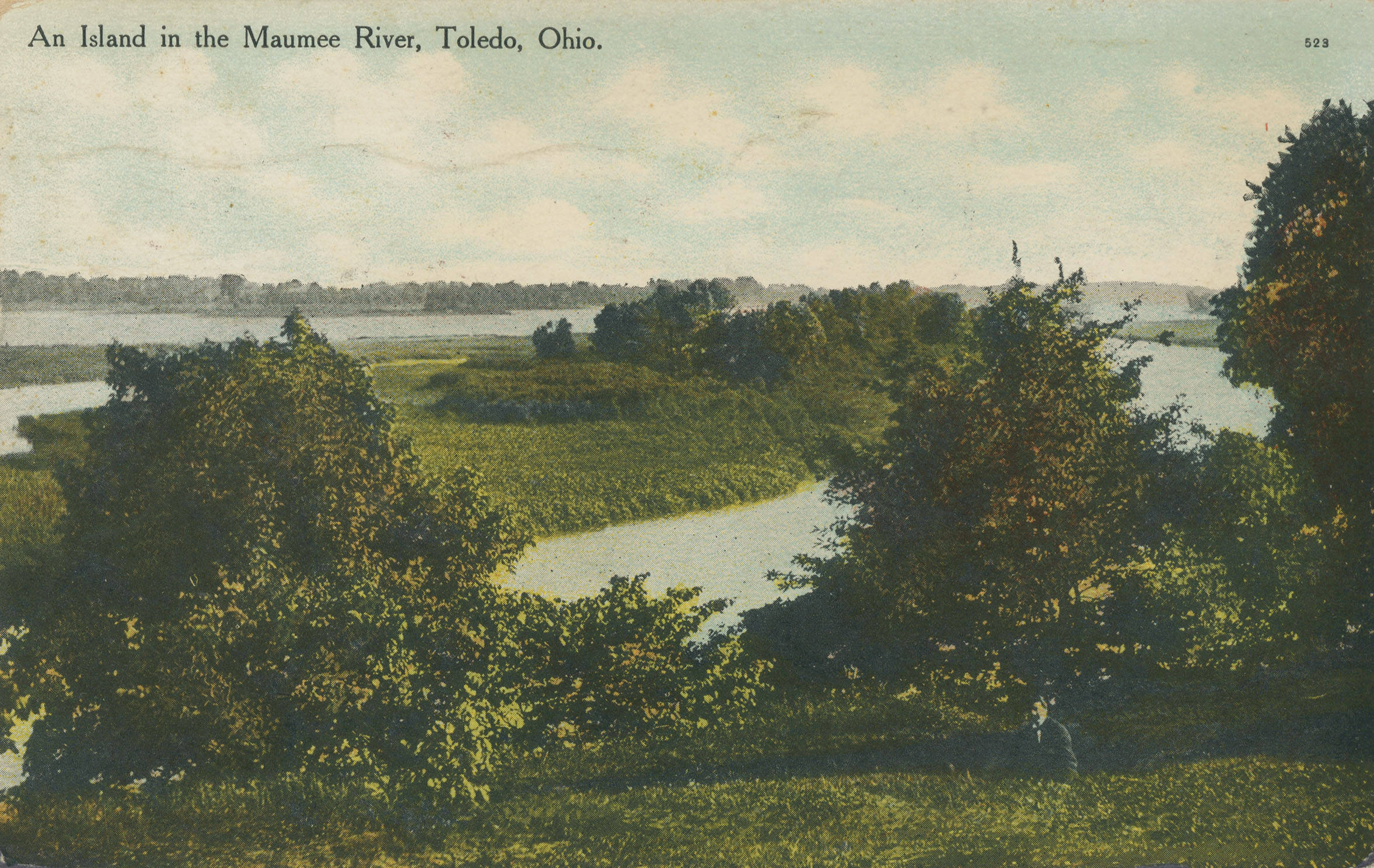
An Island in the Maumee River, Toledo, Ohio, 1909

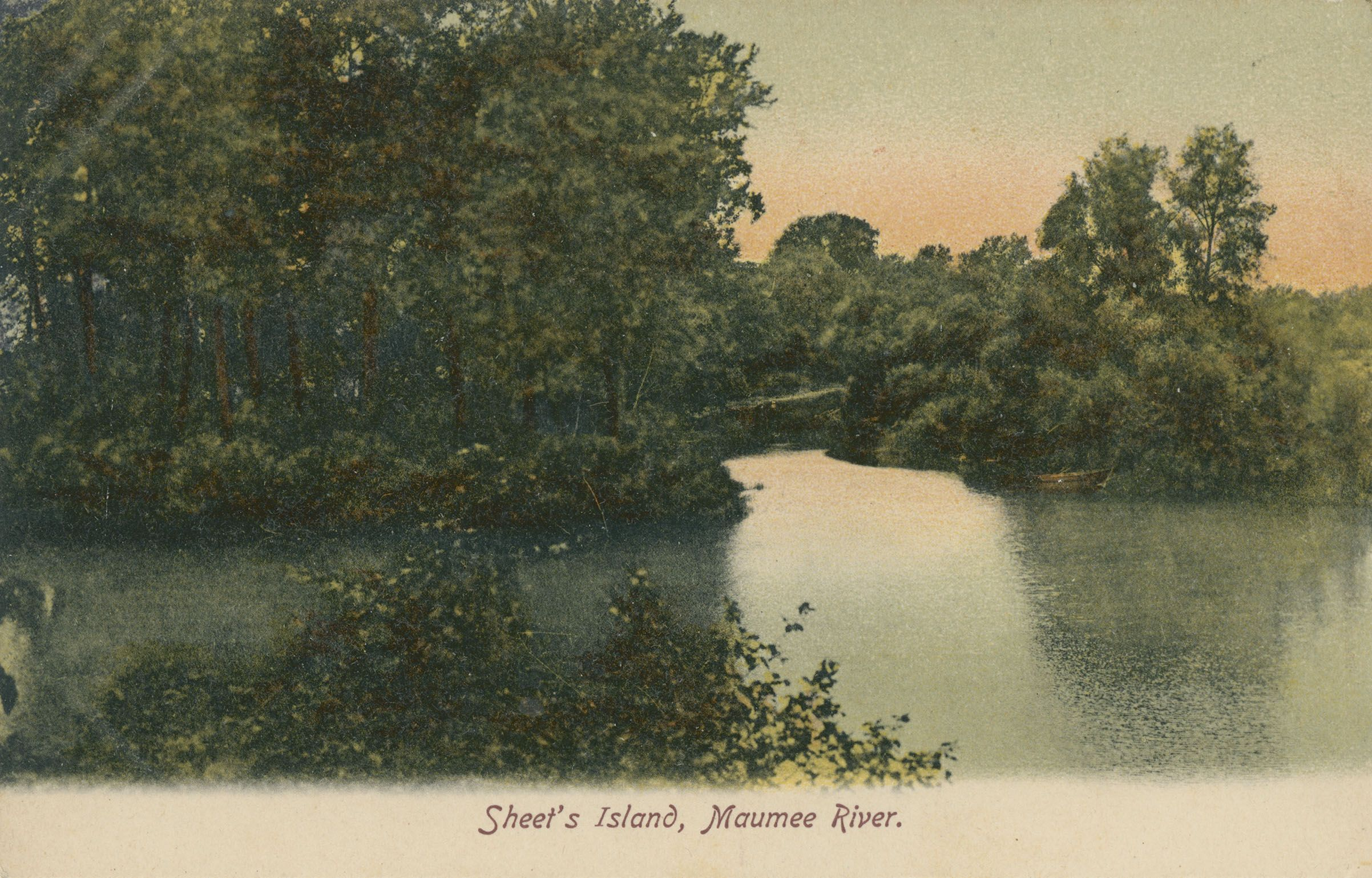
Sheet's Island, Maumee River, Maumee, Ohio, 1900s

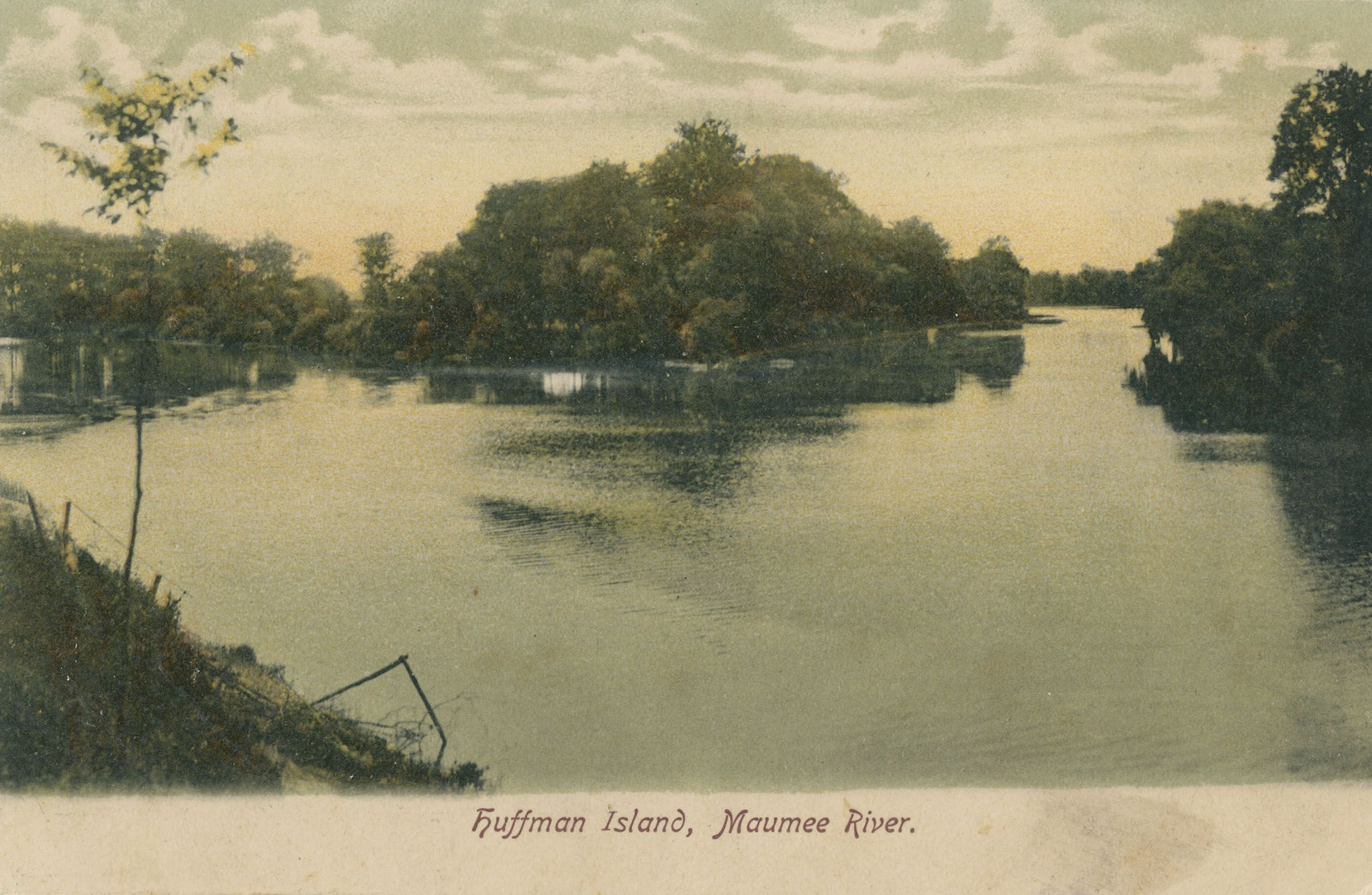
Huffman Island, Maumee River, Toledo, Ohio, 1907

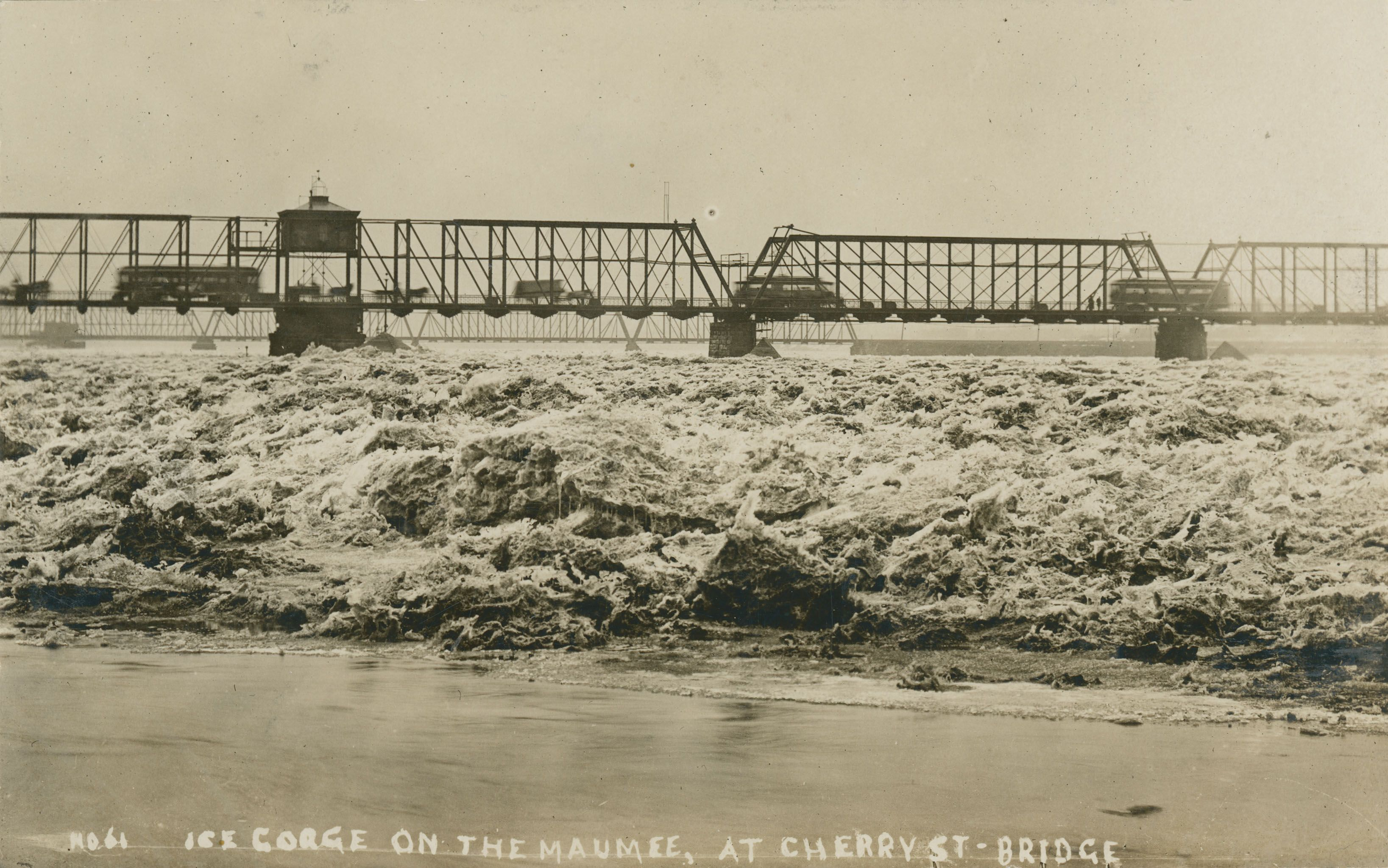
Ice Buildup on Maumee River at Cherry Street Bridge in Toledo, Ohio, 1924

Historically the river was also known as the Miami in United States treaties with Native Americans. As early as 1671, French colonists called the river Miami du Lac 'Miami of the Lake' (in contrast to the Miami of the Ohio or the Great Miami River, called Ahsenisiipi in the Miami-Illinois language). Maumee is an anglicized spelling of the Ottawa or Odawa name for the Miami tribe, Maamii. The Odawa had a village at the mouth of the Maumee River and occupied other territory in northwestern Ohio, including along its tributary, the Blanchard River.

The Battle of Fallen Timbers, the final battle of the Northwest Indian War, was fought 3/4 mi (1.2 km) north of the banks of the Maumee River. After this decisive victory for General Anthony Wayne, in 1795 Native Americans ceded a twelve-mile square tract around Perrysburg and Maumee to the United States by the Treaty of Greenville. They ceded additional lands, north of the river and downstream of Defiance, in the 1807 Treaty of Detroit. They ceded the remainder of the Maumee River valley in the 1817 Treaty of Fort Meigs.

Prior to the development of canals, portages between the rivers were important trade routes. U.S. forces built forts such as Fort Loramie, Fort Recovery, and Fort Defiance along these routes. In honor of General Wayne's victory on the banks of the Maumee, the primary bridge crossing the river near downtown Toledo is named the Anthony Wayne Suspension Bridge.

A dispute over control of part of the Maumee River region led to the so-called Toledo War between Ohio and the Michigan Territory.

Agricultural practices along the Maumee River have contributed in the 21st century to high phosphate levels in Lake Erie. This has triggered algae blooms in the lake. The drinking water from the city of Toledo was made unsafe for consumption for nearly a week in August 2014 because of such algae blooms.

== Natural history ==
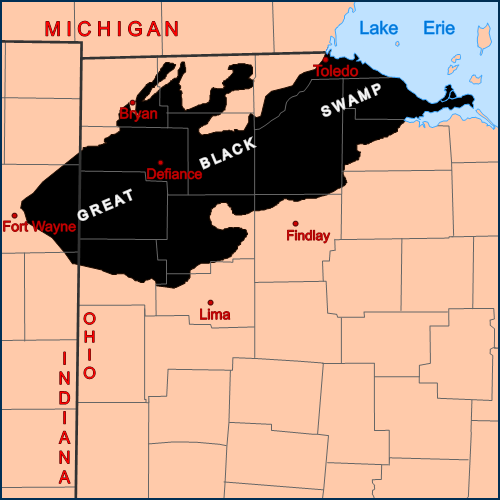
The general extent of the Great Black Swamp prior to the 19th century

The Maumee River watershed was once part of the Great Black Swamp, a remnant of Glacial Lake Maumee, the proglacial ancestor of Lake Erie. The 1,500-square-mile (3,900 km^{2}) swamp was a vast network of forests, wetlands, and grasslands, a rich habitat for numerous species of birds, mammals, fish and flora. During the 19th century, European-American settlers struggled to drain the swamp and to convert the land to farmland; they dramatically altered the habitat, reducing areas where species could flourish.

== Transportation ==
The mouth of the river at Toledo and Lake Erie is wide and supports considerable commercial traffic, including oil, grain, iron ore, and coal. About 12 miles (19 km) upstream, in the town of Perrysburg, Ohio, the river becomes much shallower and today supports only recreational navigation above that point. The Miami and Erie Canal was built parallel to and north of the Maumee between Toledo and Defiance, Ohio, to enable extended transportation of shipped goods. The canal entered the river at a "slackwater" created by Independence Dam. It exited the river at Defiance and was built to the south, ending at Cincinnati, Ohio. While abandoned for commercial use, portions of the canal's towpath are maintained for recreational use in both Lucas and Henry counties. A restored section of canal, including a canal lock, is operated at Providence Metropark, where visitors can ride an authentic canal boat.

The Wabash and Erie Canal was constructed on the south side of the river, continuing southwest from Defiance to Fort Wayne, Indiana, crossing the "summit" to the Wabash River valley (in Miami-Illinois the Wabash River was known as Waapaahšiki siipiiwi). Both canals were important pre-railway transportation methods in the 1840–60 period.

== Watershed ==
The Maumee has the largest watershed of any Great Lakes river, with 8,316 square miles (21,540 km^{2}). This area includes a portion of southern Michigan. In addition to its source tributaries – the St. Joseph River (in Miami-Illinois: Kociihsasiipi) and St. Marys (in Miami-Illinois: Nameewa siipiiwi), which were captured by river piracy, the Maumee's principal tributaries are the Auglaize River and the Tiffin River, which join it at Defiance from the south and north, respectively.

== Environmental conditions ==
=== Great Lakes Area of Concern ===
Due to environmental contamination, a portion of the river was designated a Great Lakes Area of Concern (AOC) under the Great Lakes Water Quality Agreement of 1987. The Maumee covers 8,316 square miles and has the largest drainage area of any Great Lakes river. The Maumee AOC is contained within 775 square miles of the river and includes several creeks. The environmental problems were caused by sediment contamination and agricultural runoff. The runoff caused large amounts of phosphorus to enter the river, eventually leading to manmade eutrophication in Lake Erie. Sediments at the site contained high levels of polychlorinated biphenyls (PCBs) and heavy metals, which came from old dumps, contaminated industrial sites, combined sewer overflows and disposal of dredged materials.

A 2006 remedial action plan for the AOC identified 10 "beneficial use impairments" caused by the pollution:

- Added costs to industry and agriculture, which was removed in 2015 due to no additional costs required to treat the water prior to agricultural and industrial use
- Restrictions on fish and wildlife consumption due to PCBs and heavy metals in sediments
- Eutrophication or undesirable algae, which causes persistent water quality problems, such as nuisance algal blooms, decreased water clarity and decrease of dissolved oxygen in bottom waters
- Degradation of fish and wildlife populations These levels are set based on what would be expected from the amount and quality of suitable physical, chemical and biological habitat present in the AOC.
- Beach closings due to the potential for high bacteria levels caused by combined sewer overflows
- Fish tumors or other deformities are caused by pollutants such as petroleum products and PCBs in the sediment and water.
- Degradation of aesthetics Materials and events that might cause this include oil slicks, surface scum, combined sewer overflows, excessive dust or algal blooms.
- Degradation of benthos, which was first documented in the 1950s and has been attributed to waste deposited old dumps, contaminated industrial sites, disposal of dredged materials and combined sewer overflows
- Restriction on dredging activities Contaminants in sediment can get stirred up and reintroduced to the water column during dredging activities, which remove sediment and debris from the bottom of a lake or river.
- Loss of fish and wildlife habitat Restoration actions include removing stream barriers, enhancing shoreline complexity, removing invasive species or restoring wetlands.

== Islands ==
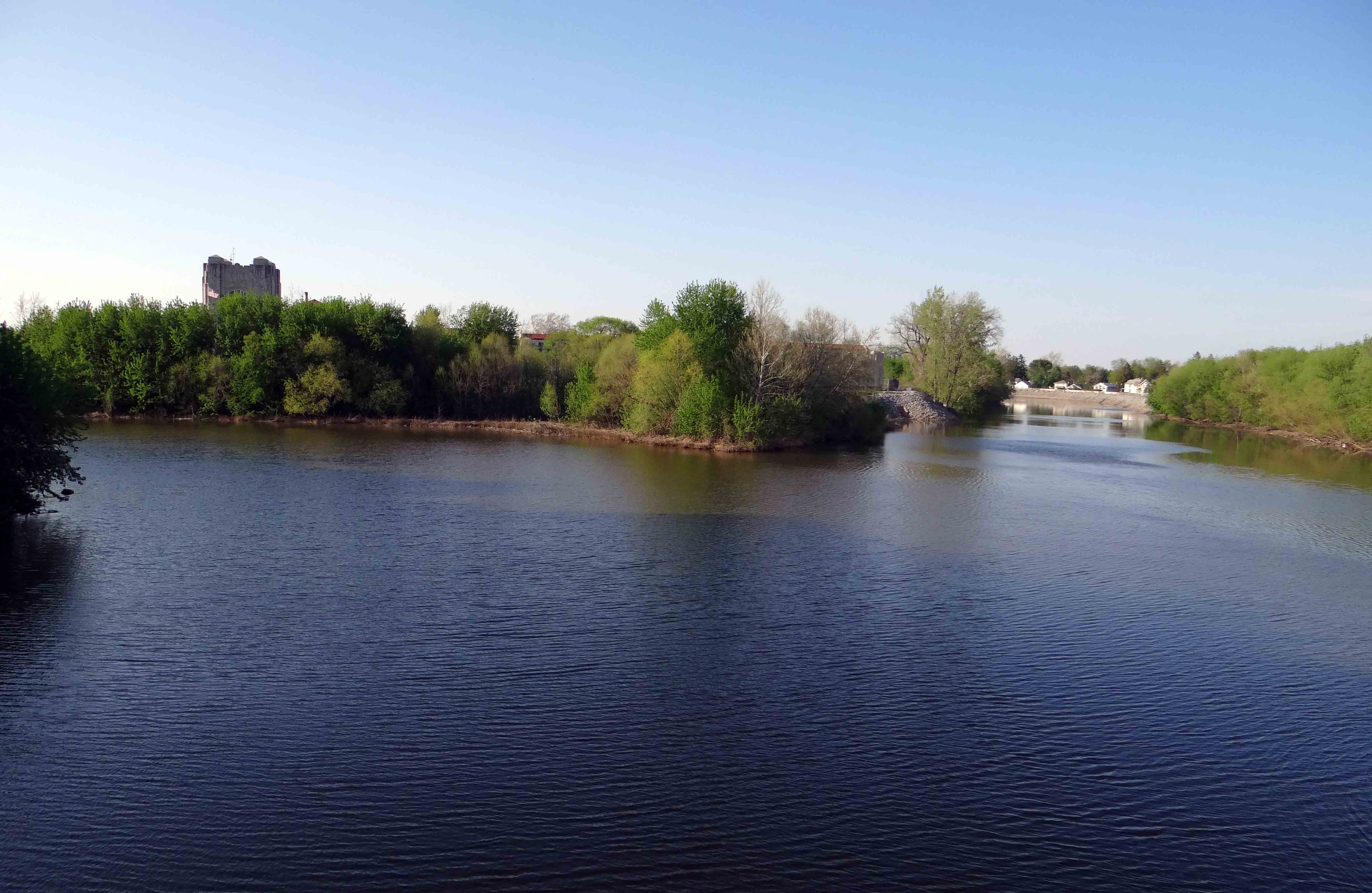
The St. Marys River (left) and St. Joseph River (right) converge to form the Maumee River (foreground) in Fort Wayne, Indiana.

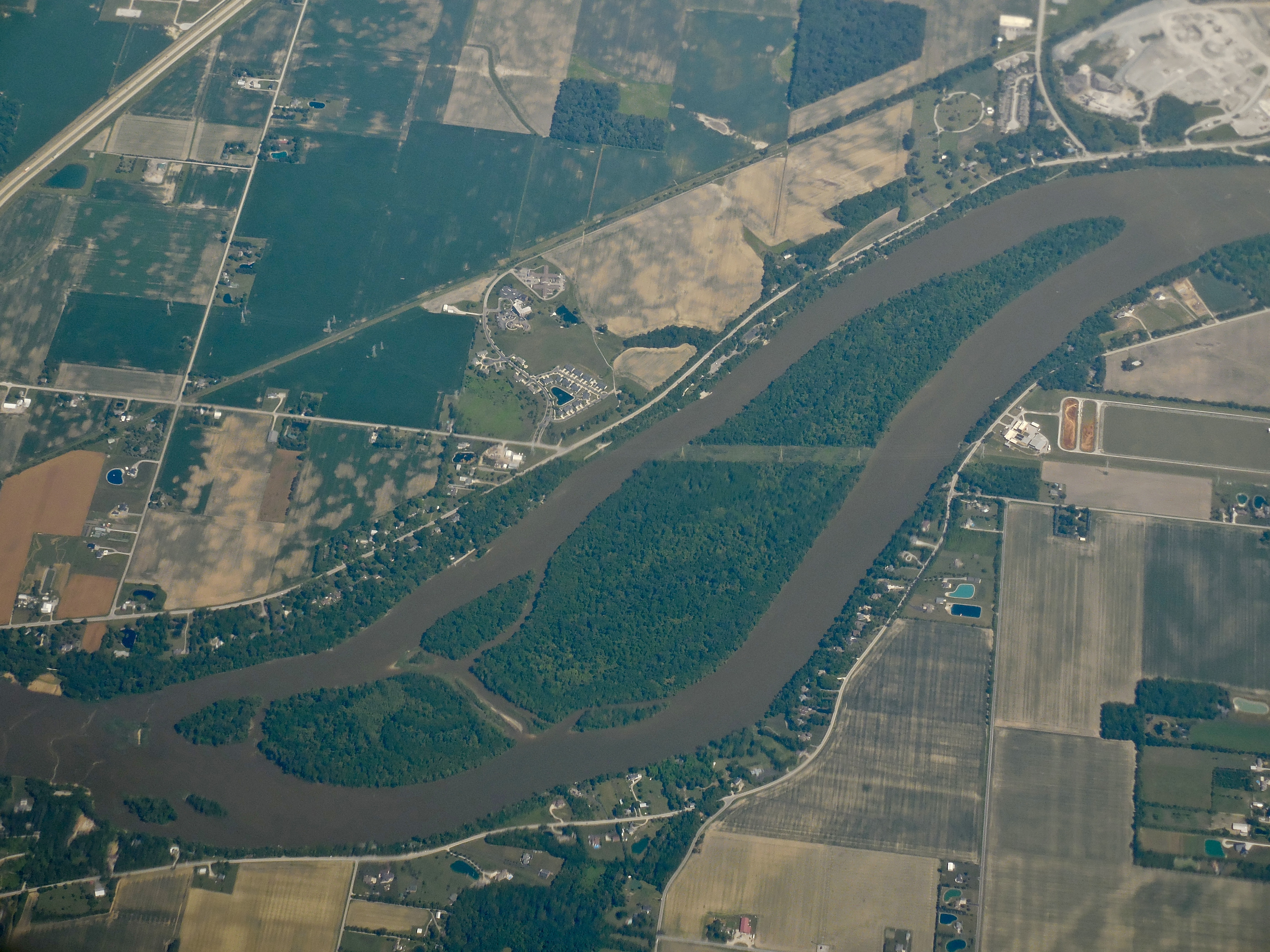
Aerial view of (from largest to smallest) Missionary, Indian, Butler, Woodcock, and Grave Islands.

There are several small islands in the section of the Maumee River in northwest Ohio. The names of the islands are:

- Indian Island – near Farnsworth Park west of Toledo
- Woodcock Island – just west of Indian Island, adjacent to Missionary Island
- Missionary Island – near Farnsworth Park west of Toledo
- Granger Island – near Waterville, Ohio
- Butler Island – near Farnsworth Metropark, adjacent to Missionary Island's North East side
- Grave Island – adjacent to Missionary Island on its south side, opposite of Butler Island
- Otter Island – five miles downstream of Grand Rapids
- Hedges Island – located south side of Otter Island
- Millers Island – three miles downstream of Grand Rapids
- Caseys Island – west of Millers Island
- Sheets Island – close to Caseys Island
- Fox Island – two miles downstream of Grand Rapids
- Number 3 Island – two miles east of Grand Rapids
- Howard Island – near Grand Rapids Park, in Grand Rapids
- Buttonwood Island – located north of Howard Island
- Bluegrass Island – part of Side Cut Metropark
- Ewing Island – the largest island in the Maumee River, formerly McKee's Island, part of Audubon Islands State Nature Preserve
- Grape Island – immediately west of Ewing Island, part of Audubon Islands State Nature Preserve
- Marengo Island – near Maumee, Ohio
- Horseshoe Island – near Walbridge Park in Toledo
- Clark Island – near Walbridge Park in Toledo
- Corbutt Island – in Toledo
- Grassy Island – at the mouth of Grassy Creek at Rossford, Ohio.
- Girty's Island – two miles downstream of Florida, Ohio
- Sand Island – one mile upstream of Florida, Ohio
- Preston Island – near Defiance, Ohio
- Little Sisters Island – near Rossford, Ohio

== Walleye run ==
According to the Ohio Department of Natural Resources, the annual walleye run up the Maumee River is one of the largest migrations of riverbound walleye east of the Mississippi. The migration of the walleye normally starts in early March and runs through the end of April. Although the first week of April is "historically" the peak of the migration, it varies according to environmental conditions. When river flows rise due to snow melt-off and the river water temperature reaches 40 to 50 °F (4 to 10 °C), the migration begins. Walleye come to spawn from the western end of Lake Erie and the Detroit River and Lake St. Clair in Michigan. The most popular method of fishing for the migrating walleye is by wading out into the river and casting.

== Cities and towns along the river ==
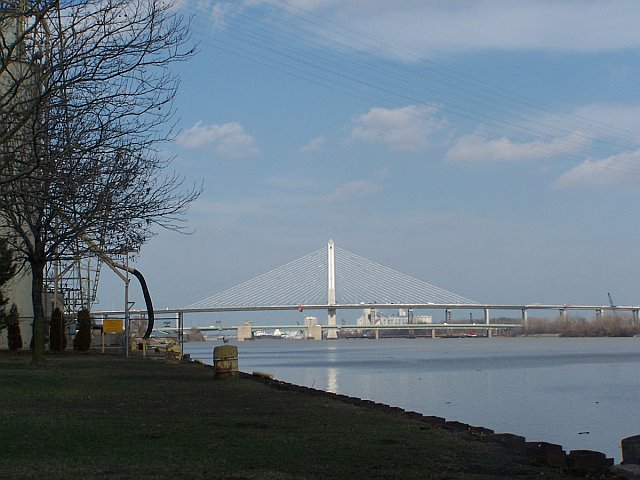
The Veterans' Glass City Skyway in Toledo, Ohio

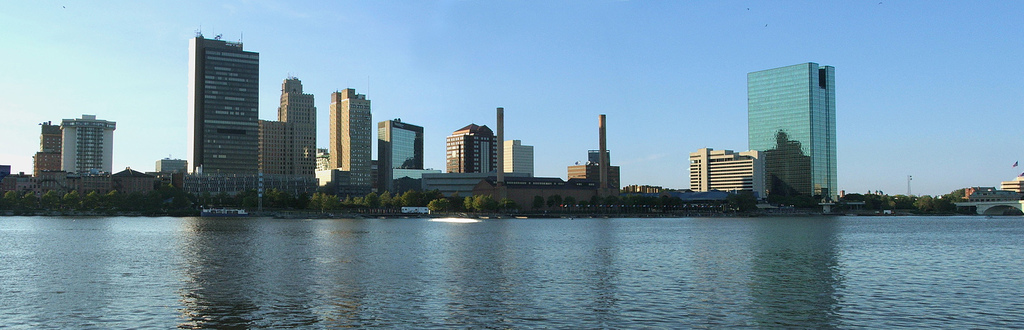
Toledo, Ohio

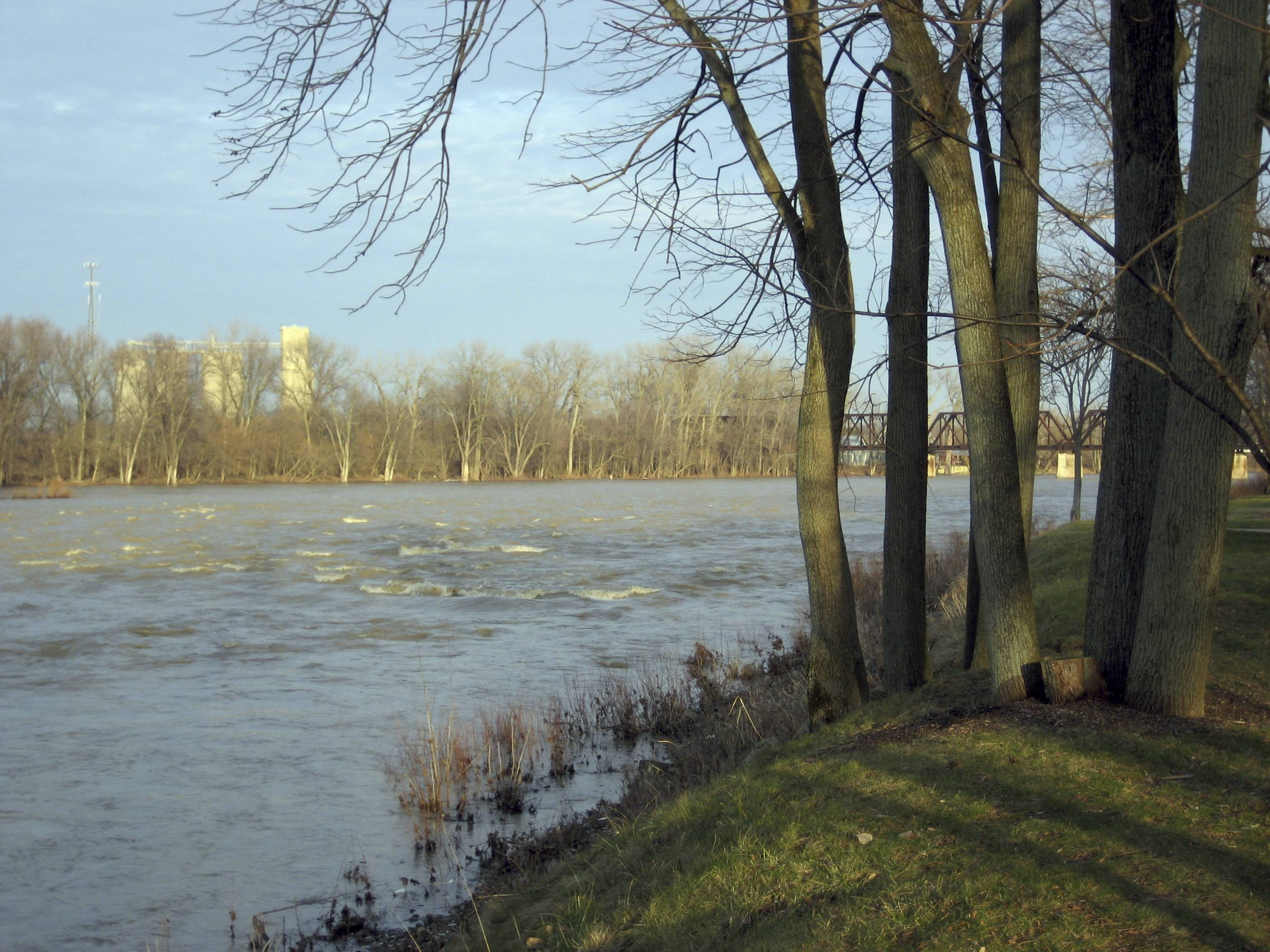
The river in Grand Rapids, Ohio

- Fort Wayne, Indiana
- New Haven, Indiana
- Woodburn, Indiana
- Antwerp, Ohio
- Cecil, Ohio
- Defiance, Ohio
- Florida, Ohio
- Napoleon, Ohio
- Grand Rapids, Ohio
- Waterville, Ohio
- Maumee, Ohio
- Perrysburg, Ohio
- Rossford, Ohio
- Toledo, Ohio
- Oregon, Ohio

== See also ==
- List of Indiana rivers
- List of rivers of Ohio
- USS Maumee – list of ships named for the river
