= Southview High School =

Southview High School may refer to:

- South View High School in Hope Mills, North Carolina
- Southview High School (Lorain, Ohio) in Lorain, Ohio
- Sylvania Southview High School in Sylvania, Ohio
