= Sylvan Elementary School =

Sylvan Elementary School can refer to one of several United States elementary schools:

- Sylvan Elementary School (Alamance County) in Alamance County, North Carolina
- Sylvan Elementary School (Sylvania) in Sylvania, Ohio
- Sylvan Park Elementary School in Los Angeles, California
