= Mark Berger (economist) =

Professor Mark C. Berger (July 24, 1955 – April 30, 2003) was the director of The Center for Business and Economic Research at the University of Kentucky until his death at age 47. He was also a Fulbright Scholar at University College Dublin. Originally hailing from Sylvania, Ohio, Berger earned his BA from the University of Toledo and his MA and PhD from Ohio State University.

== Career ==
- University of Kentucky 1981 to 2003
  - Director of the Center for Business and Economic Research
  - William B. Sturgill Professor of Economics
  - Associate Professor
- University College Dublin 2002 to 2003
  - Fulbright Scholar
- University of Chicago 1987 to 1988
  - Visiting Professor
- University of Vienna in Austria 1996
  - Visiting Professor

== Death ==
Berger died of a seizure, after returning to Kentucky from Ireland to receive treatment for recently diagnosed cancer. During the chemotherapy Berger was given a different seizure medication which did not prevent the fatal seizure.

== Articles mentioning Berger ==
- Kentucky Economics (Page 2)

== Known works of Mark Berger ==
- Do Workers Pay for On-the-Job Training? Barron, John M., Mark C. Berger, and Dan A. Black. 1999. Journal of Human Resources 34(2):235-252.
- Compensating Differentials in Emerging Labor and Housing Markets: Estimates of Quality of Life in Russian Cities by Mark C. Berger, Glenn C. Blomquist, Klara Sabirianova Peter (October 2003)
- Worker Training in a Restructuring Economy: Evidence from the Russian Transition by Mark C. Berger, John S. Earle, Klara Sabirianova Peter (September 2001)
- Berger, Mark C.; Hirsch, Barry T., "The Effects of Cohort Size on the Earnings Growth of Young Males." Mimeograph. Department of Economics, University of Kentucky, n.d..
- Berger, Mark C.; Black, Dan A.; Scott, Frank A.; Chandra, Amitabh, "Health insurance coverage of the unemployed: COBRA and the potential effects of Kassebaum-Kennedy." Journal of Policy Analysis and Management. Sum 1999, 18, (3), 430 - 448.
- Berger, Mark C.; Black, Dan A.; Scott, Frank A., "How well do we measure employer-provided health insurance coverage." Contemporary Economic Policy. July 1998, 16, (3), 356 - 367.
- Barron, John M.; Berger, Mark C.; Black, Dan A., "How Well Do We Measure Training?." Journal of Labor Economics. 1997, 15, (3, part 1), 507 - 528.
- Scott, Frank A.; Berger, Mark C.; Garen, John E., "Do health insurance and pension costs reduce the job opportunities of older workers?." Industrial and Labor Relations Review. July 1995, 48, (4), 775.
- Berger, Mark C., "Demographic Cycles, Cohort Size, and Earnings." Demography. May 1989, 26, (2), 311.
- Berger, Mark C.; Leigh, J. Paul, "Schooling, self-selection, and health." Journal of Human Resources. Sum 1989, 24, (3), 433 - 455.
- Scott, Frank A.; Berger, Mark C.; Black, Dan A., "Effects of the Tax Treatment of Fringe Benefits on Labor Market Segmentation." Industrial and Labor Relations Review. January 1989, 42, (2), 216 - 229.
- Berger, Mark C., "Predicted Future Earnings and Choice of College Major." Industrial and Labor Relations Review. April 1988, 41, (3), 418 - 429.
- Berger, Mark C.; Blomquist, Glenn C.; Waldner, Werner, "A Revealed-Preference Ranking of Quality of Life for Metropolitan Areas." Social Science Quarterly. December 1987, 68, (4), 761 - 778.
- Berger, Mark C.; Hirsch, Barry T., "Veteran Status as a Screening Device During the Vietnam Era." Social Science Quarterly. March 1985, 66, (1), 79 - 89.
- Berger, Mark C., "Cohort Size and the Earnings Growth of Young Workers." Industrial and Labor Relations Review. July 1984, 37, (4), 582 - 591.
- Berger, Mark C., "Changes in labor force composition and male earnings: A production approach." Journal of Human Resources. Spr 1983, 18, (2), 177 - 196.
- Berger, Mark C.; Hirsch, Barry T., "The civilian earnings experience of Vietnam-Era veterans." Journal of Human Resources. Aut 1983, 18, (4), 455 - 479.
- Mark Berger, Dan Black, and Frank Scott, "Is There Job Lock?" Southern Economic Journal 70, April 2004, 953–976.
- Eric Thompson, Frank Scott, and Mark Berger, "Deregulation in the Electric Utility Industry: Excess Capacity and the Transition to a Long Run Competitive Market," Growth and Change 35, Winter 2004, 1-21.
- Mark Berger, Dan Black, Amitabh Chandra, and Frank Scott, "Children, Nondiscriminatory Provision of Fringe Benefits, and Household Labor Market Decisions," Research in Labor Economics vol. 22 (Worker Well-being and Public Policy, S. W. Polachek, ed.) 2003, 309–349.
- Mark Berger, Dan Black, Jodi Messer, and Frank Scott, "COBRA, Spouse Coverage, and Health Insurance Decisions of Older Households," Journal of Forensic Economics 15, Spring/Summer 2002, 147–164.
- Dan Black, Mark Berger, and Frank Scott, "Bounding Parameter Estimates with Non-Classical Measurement Error," Journal of the American Statistical Association 95, September 2000, 739–748.
- Mark C. Berger, Dan A. Black, Frank A. Scott, and Amitabh Chandra, "Health Insurance Coverage of the Unemployed: COBRA and the Potential Effects of Kassebaum-Kennedy," Journal of Policy Analysis and Management 18, Summer 1999, 430–448.
- Mark C. Berger, Dan A. Black, and Frank A. Scott, "How Well Do We Measure Employer-Provided Health Insurance?" Contemporary Economic Policy 16, July 1998, 356–367.
- John Garen, Mark Berger, and Frank Scott, "Pensions, Non-Discrimination Policies, and the Employment of Older Workers," The Quarterly Review of Economics and Finance 36, Winter 1996, 417–429.
- Frank A. Scott, Mark C. Berger, and John E. Garen, "Do Health Insurance Costs and Non-Discrimination Policies Reduce the Job Opportunities of Older Workers?" Industrial and Labor Relations Review 48, July 1995, 775–791.
