= Sylvania Northview High School =

Public, coeducational high school in Sylvania Ohio, United States

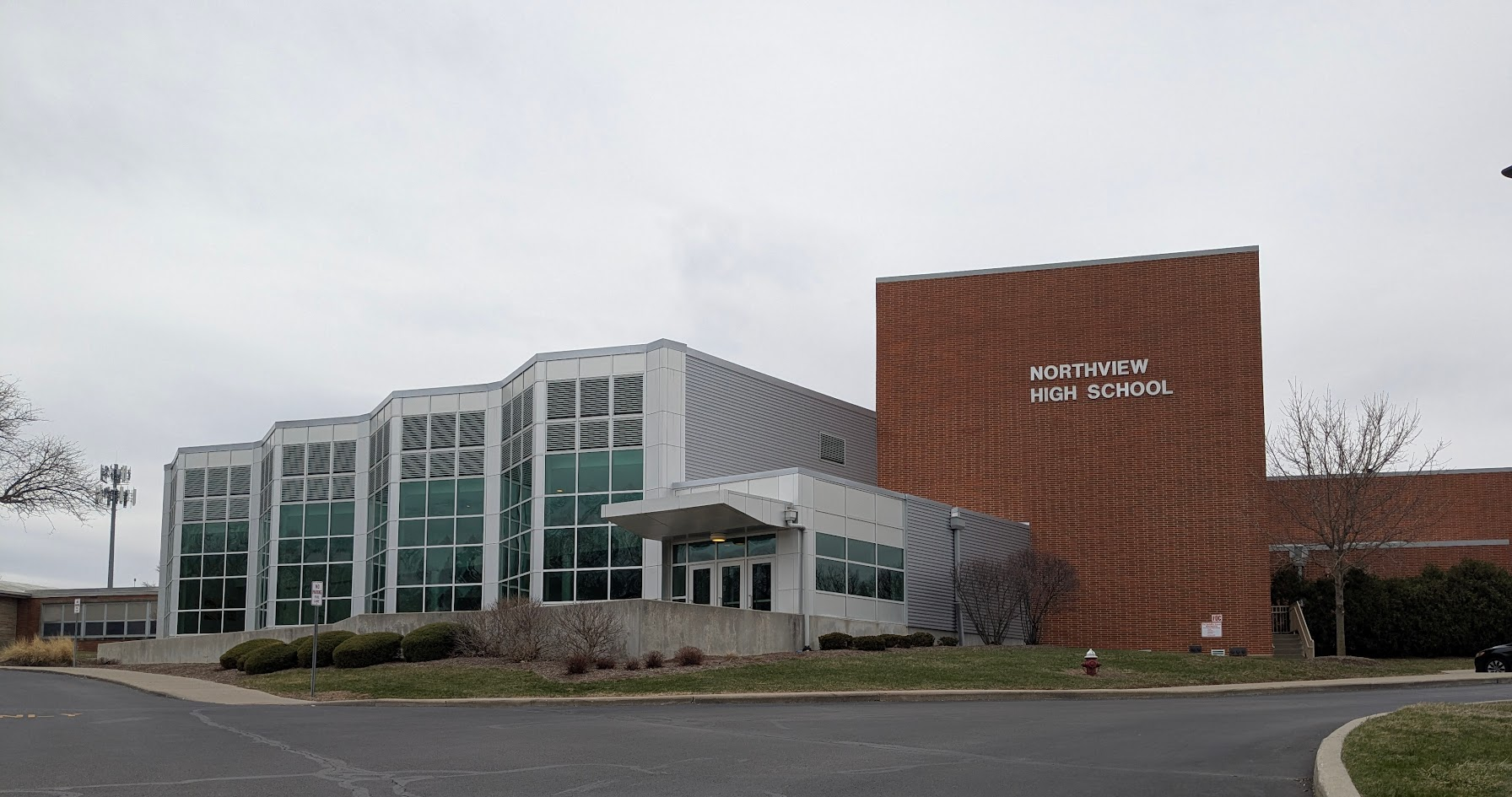
- Front facade of the school's auditorium

Location
- 5403 Silica Drive Sylvania, Ohio; Sylvania, (Lucas County), Ohio 43560; United States; 41°42′46″N 83°42′36″W

Information
- Other names: Northview High School, NVHS
- Former name: Sylvania High School
- Type: Public, Coeducational high school
- Established: 1960
- School district: Sylvania City School District
- Superintendent: Tim Zieroff
- Area trustee: Sylvania Township Trustees
- CEEB code: 364930
- Principal: Greg Radwan
- Staff: 144
- Teaching staff: 74.00 (FTE)
- Grades: 9-12
- Enrollment: 1274
- Student to teacher ratio: 17.80
- Campus type: Suburban
- Colors: Black & Gold
- Fight song: Across the Field
- Athletics conference: Northern Lakes League
- Mascot: Willie the Wildcat
- Nickname: Wild Willies
- Team name: Wildcats
- Rival: Southview Cougars
- Accreditation: Ohio Department of Education and Workforce
- USNWR ranking: 2,364
- Newspaper: The Student Prints
- Yearbook: Wyandotte
- Website: www.sylvaniaschools.org/northviewhighschool_home.aspx

Sylvania Northview High School is a public coeducational high school located in Sylvania, Ohio, operated by the Sylvania City School District. Established in 1960 as Sylvania High School, it assumed its current name in 1976 upon the opening of a second district campus, Sylvania Southview High School. The school enrolls 1,274 students in grades 9 through 12 and competes as the Wildcats in the Northern Lakes League.

The school has produced several notable alumni, including Chip Davis, founder of Mannheim Steamroller, author and screenwriter Scott Smith, and NFL center Luke Fortner. Its athletics program has claimed two OHSAA state championships in ice hockey and one in baseball, and national scholastic esports championships in Super Smash Bros. Ultimate and Overwatch 2. A 2019 incident involving a student athlete's hijab drew international media attention and led the Ohio High School Athletic Association to revise its uniform regulations.

== Administration ==
The current principal is Greg Radwan. The current assistant principal for Student Services is Desiree Edison and the current assistant principal for teaching and learning is Gracy Lloyd. The school's athletic director is Chris Irwin. The school is part of the Sylvania City School District, overseen by superintendent Superintendent Tim Zieroff.

== History ==
The school opened in 1960 as Sylvania High School, the sole secondary school serving the Sylvania City School District and successor to Burnham High School, which was demolished in 2010. As district enrollment grew over the following decade and a half, plans were developed for a second campus. Upon the opening of Sylvania Southview High School in 1976, the original campus was renamed Sylvania Northview to distinguish the two schools.

== Academics ==
Northview is accredited by the Ohio Department of Education and holds designations as a High Schools That Work school and an AP Capstone school. The school has received a five-star designation from the Ohio Department of Education and Workforce for at least two consecutive years and offers 23 Advanced Placement courses, with 90% of AP exam scores earning a 3 or higher in 2024–25. The school has been recognized with a U.S. News & World Report Silver Award and ranks 217 among Newsweek's Top 500 College Prep High Schools.

The four-year graduation rate is 94%, above the Ohio state average of 86%. Of the Class of 2025, 67% attended a college or university and 70% graduated with college credit already earned through AP, College Credit Plus, or Career Technical coursework. The school produced one National Merit Scholarship finalist, one semifinalist, and three commended scholars in the Class of 2025.

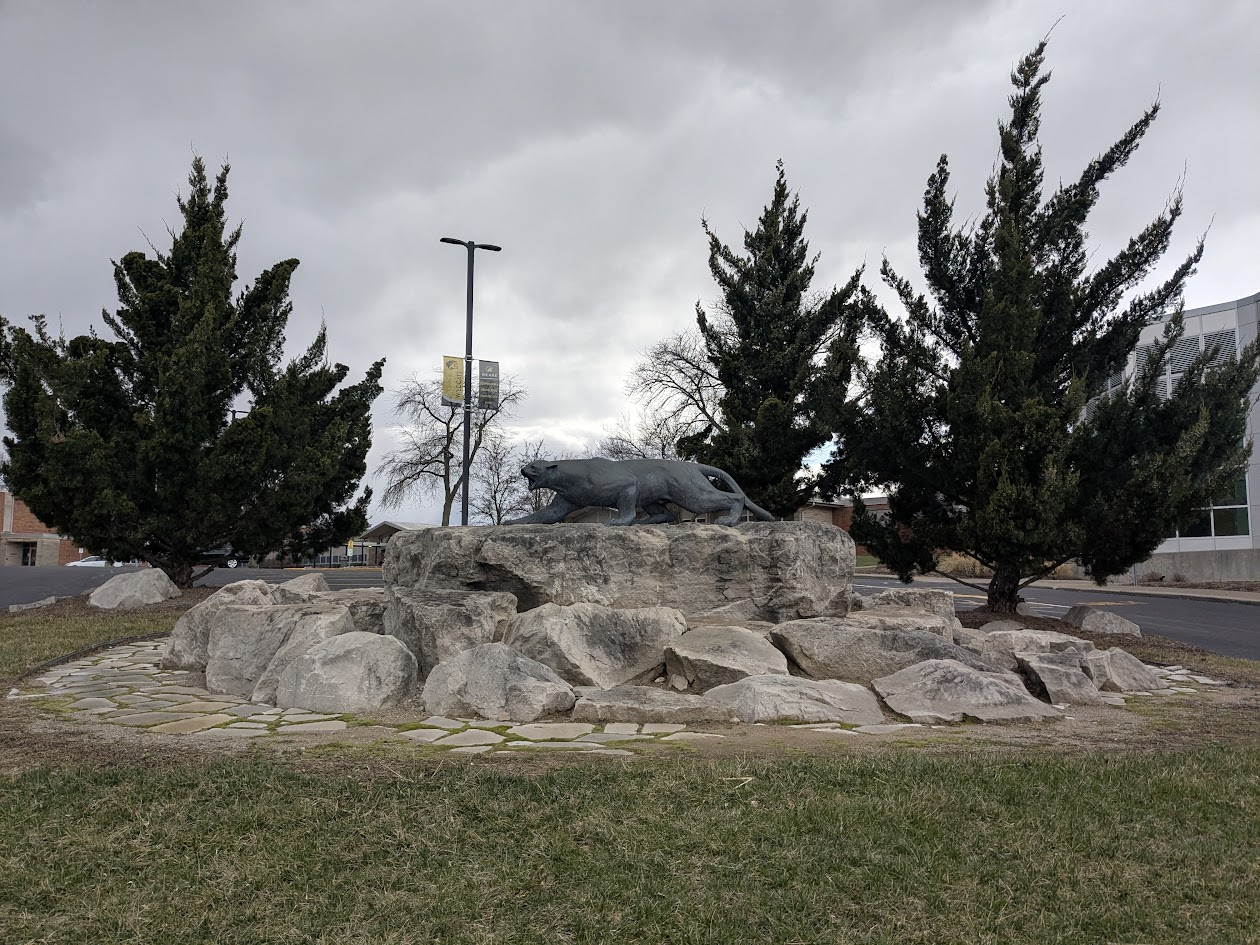
Wildcat statue at the entrance of Northview

== Extracurriculars ==
=== Speech and Debate ===
The Northview Speech and Debate team competes through the National Speech and Debate Association and the Ohio Speech and Debate Association (Formerly known as the Ohio High School Speech League or OHSSL). Northview has co-hosted the OHSSL State Tournament and, jointly with Sylvania Southview High School, has hosted largest Speech and Debate tournament in the state of Ohio.

Students compete across team and partner debate events including Lincoln–Douglas debate, public forum debate, congressional debate, and speaking events such as United States extemporaneous speaking, international extemporaneous speaking, informative speaking, humorous interpretation, dramatic interpretation, and duo interpretation.

=== Science Olympiad ===
The Northview Science Olympiad team has qualified for the state competition since 2008 and has placed first at the regional tournament yearly since 2015. Northview hosts an annual invitational tournament typically held in December. The Science Olympiad program consists of two teams, Gold and Black; the Gold team serves as the varsity team and the Black team as junior varsity.

=== Quiz Bowl ===
The Northview Quiz Bowl team has achieved success at the bracket level and has represented the school at multiple state and national competitions.

=== Esports ===
Northview fields competitive Esports teams as part of its activities program. In 2024, the Super Smash Bros. Ultimate team won the Ohio state championship, defeating Dublin Coffman High School 2–0 in the final. Both the Super Smash Bros. and Overwatch 2 teams subsequently claimed first place at the LeagueOS Scholastic National Championship.

=== Band, Orchestra, and Choir ===
Northview's instrumental music program encompasses two departments. The band program, led by head director Nathan Heath and assistant director Carter Adams, includes a marching band, three concert ensembles (Concert Band, Symphonic Band, and Wind Ensemble), and two jazz ensembles (Jazz Cats and Jazz Band) The orchestra program, directed by Anna Davis, consists of three ensembles: Concert Orchestra, Academy Orchestra, and Chamber Orchestra. Members of both programs have regularly been selected for honors ensembles throughout Ohio.

Northview's choir program is taught by Choir teacher Jeremy Davis who also serves as the High School Honors Choir director of the Ohio Music Education Association.

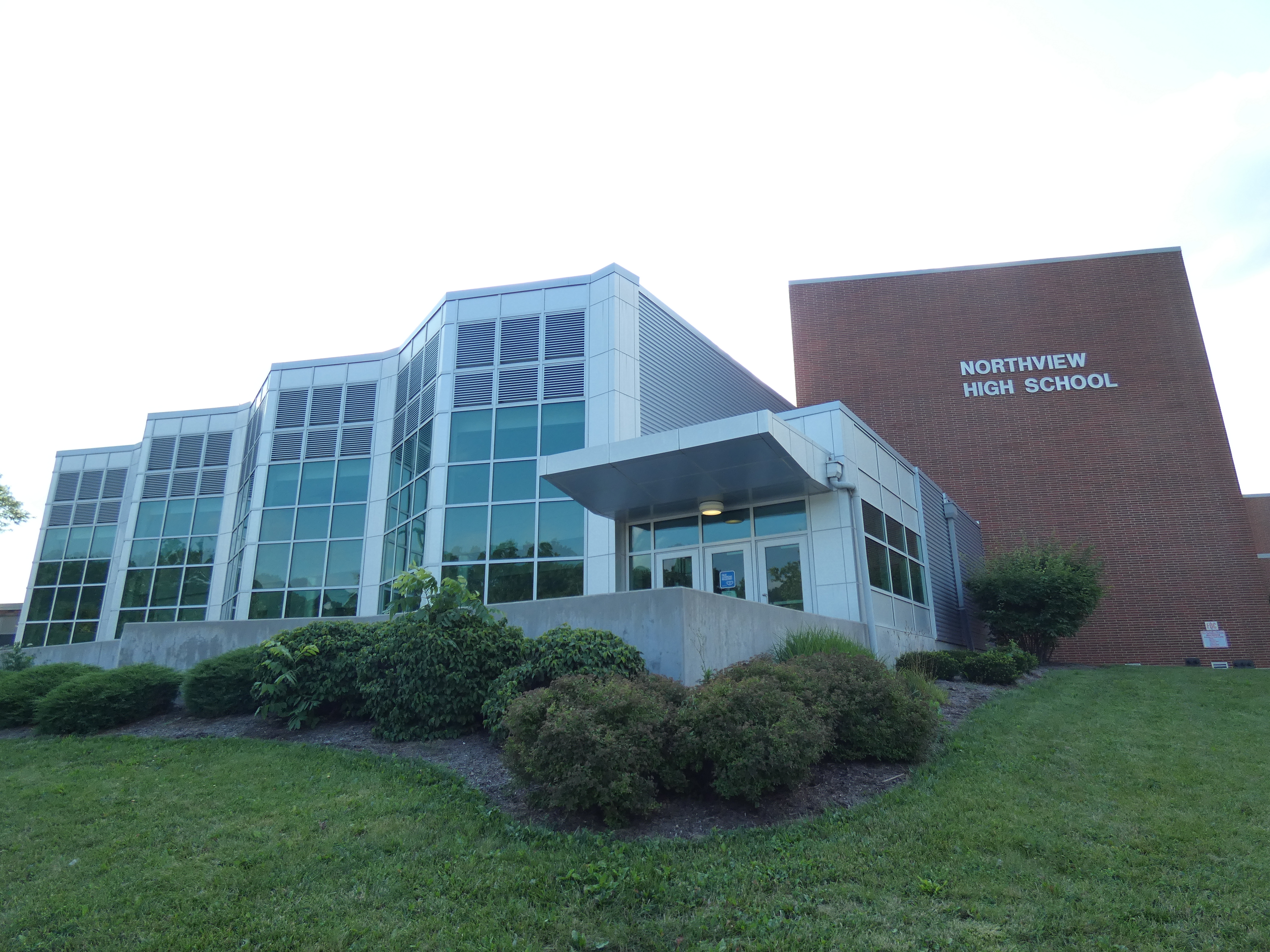
Northview Performing Arts Center facade

=== Theatre ===
The Northview theatre program has a history of producing students who advance to the All-Ohio show. Notable past productions include The Laramie Project (2012) and Rent (2013). The program held the OhEdTA Northwest Area State Thespian Officer position during the 2013–2014 and 2014–2015 seasons. Theatre productions are held in the Performing Arts Center.

=== Student government ===
Northview maintains four student governments, each representing a different grade level. Students serve as president, vice president, treasurer, secretary, and representatives for their respective grade, collaborating with local restaurants to fundraise for their class’ homecoming and prom dances.

The freshman class government, in collaboration with the sophomore class government organizes an annual 'Cocoa and Cram' event prior to first semester exams to provide a space for freshman to study, prepare, and be tutored by upperclassmen.

=== Student council ===
Northview's student council organizes various school-wide spirit events and charity events, including Color Cloud, Powder Puff, an annual Veteran's Day breakfast, white elephant event, t-shirt sales, spring fling, and block party.

Color Cloud is held during a football match near the beginning of the season, where students wearing white t-shirts receive packets of colorful powder made of cornstarch and simultaneously throw it into the practice field stands to form a large, colorful cloud covering the student body.

Powder Puff is a charity event where female students play a match of flag football and male students act as cheerleaders. Proceeds from Powder Puff are donated to local charities.

=== National Honor Society ===
Northview hosts a chapter of the National Honor Society (NHS), which recognizes students for scholarship, leadership, service, and character. NHS members are selected and interviewed for admittance during the second semester of their junior year, before being inducted. NHS members volunteer during their senior year, such as by delivering and placing Northview-branded yard signs for incoming freshman.

=== DECA and BPA ===
Northview supports student participation in Distributive Education Clubs of America (DECA) and Business Professionals of America (BPA), career and technical student organizations focused on business, marketing, entrepreneurship, and information technology.

=== Cookies for Better ===
Cookies for Better (formerly known as 'Baking for Better') is a student-founded 501(c)(3) nonprofit organization that originated at Northview. It was established in March 2024 to donate to local community organizations. Cookies for Better serves multiple Toledo-area charities with baked goods and monetary donations.

== Athletics ==
Northview competes in the Northern Lakes League (NLL) across a variety of sports. The school's primary rival is Sylvania Southview High School. Northview has won NLL championships across more than a dozen sports, including cross country, football, golf, soccer, tennis, volleyball, basketball, baseball, softball, and track and field.

=== State championships ===
The school has won the following Ohio High School Athletic Association state championships:

- Baseball – 2022
- Boys' Ice Hockey – 2012; 2014 (co-champions)

=== NLL championships ===
As of 2025, Northview has accumulated NLL championships across the following sports, per NLL records:

- Boys cross country – 2002, 2003, 2004, 2005, 2006, 2007, 2008, 2009, 2010, 2011, 2012, 2018 (12 titles)
- Girls cross country – 2000, 2008, 2009, 2010, 2011, 2012, 2016, 2017 (8 titles)
- Football – 2005 (1 title)
- Boys golf – 2002, 2004, 2012, 2014, 2015, 2017, 2018, 2019 (8 titles)
- Girls golf – 2007, 2008, 2009, 2012, 2014, 2016, 2017 (7 titles)
- Boys soccer – 1997, 2003, 2005, 2010, 2013, 2014, 2015, 2016, 2018, 2020 (10 titles)
- Girls soccer – 1998, 1999, 2000, 2001, 2002, 2003, 2004, 2005, 2006, 2007, 2008, 2015, 2020 (13 titles)
- Girls tennis – 1996, 1997, 1998, 1999, 2000, 2001, 2002, 2012, 2020 (9 titles)
- Volleyball – 1997, 1998, 1999, 2003, 2006, 2015, 2022 (7 titles)
- Boys basketball – 1999, 2000, 2001, 2016, 2019, 2022 (6 titles)
- Girls basketball – 1998, 2000, 2001, 2003, 2004, 2005, 2010, 2011, 2012, 2015, 2016 (11 titles)
- Boys swimming – 2009 (1 title)
- Girls gymnastics – 1999 (1 title)
- Baseball – 2024 (1 title)
- Softball – 1997, 2004 (2 titles)
- Boys tennis – 2003, 2004, 2005, 2012 (4 titles)
- Boys track and field – 2009, 2010, 2011, 2021 (4 titles)
- Girls track and field – 2002, 2003, 2004, 2012 (4 titles)
- Girls lacrosse – 2018 (1 title)

=== Soccer ===
The boys' soccer program has won ten NLL championships and three OHSAA Division I District championships, as well as the 2007 OHSAA Division I Regional championship. The girls' soccer program has won thirteen NLL championships.

=== Volleyball ===
The Northview volleyball program has won seven NLL championships (1997, 1998, 1999, 2003, 2006, 2015, 2022) and three OHSAA District championships (1997, 2020, 2022). In 2022, the program recorded its first 20-win season in history and was ranked in the OHSVCA Coaches Poll for only the second time.

=== Ice hockey ===
Northview's ice hockey program has won two OHSAA state titles (2012, 2014). The 2014 championship was shared with a co-champion with St. Ignatius following a seven-overtime final.

== Controversies ==
=== 2019 hijab disqualification ===
In 2019, a student athlete from Toledo Islamic Academy who competed as part of Northview's cross country team was disqualified from the regional meet after her coach failed to file a required waiver for her hijab, which district officials deemed a uniform violation under OHSAA. The incident drew widespread international attention, including a public statement of support from U.S. Senator Elizabeth Warren. Following significant public backlash, the OHSAA subsequently revised its uniform regulations to address religious head coverings.

=== 2026 pre-tournament incident ===
In 2026, several Northview students — reportedly including members of the boy's ice hockey team — were involved in an underage drinking incident at a private residence in Sylvania, Ohio, shortly before the OHSAA Frozen Four hockey tournament. Officers from the Sylvania Township Police Department responded to a 911 call reporting intoxicated minors. Breathalyzer testing of thirteen individuals revealed that most showed no alcohol, while several registered measurable blood alcohol levels. The students were released to their parents; potential charges were referred to Lucas County Juvenile Court or Sylvania Municipal Court. The Sylvania City School District confirmed it was aware of the incident and launched an investigation, stating that any disciplinary action would comply with the school's code of conduct.

== Notable alumni ==
- Chip Davis – founder and creator of Mannheim Steamroller
- Scott Smith – author and screenwriter of A Simple Plan, and The Ruins.
- Oliver Cooper – actor, known for Project X
- Terry Cook – former NASCAR driver
- Luke Fortner – NFL center; played for the Jacksonville Jaguars (2022–2024) and New Orleans Saints (2025); signed with the Carolina Panthers in 2026
