= Wildwood Preserve Metropark =

Nature reserve and historic estate in Ohio

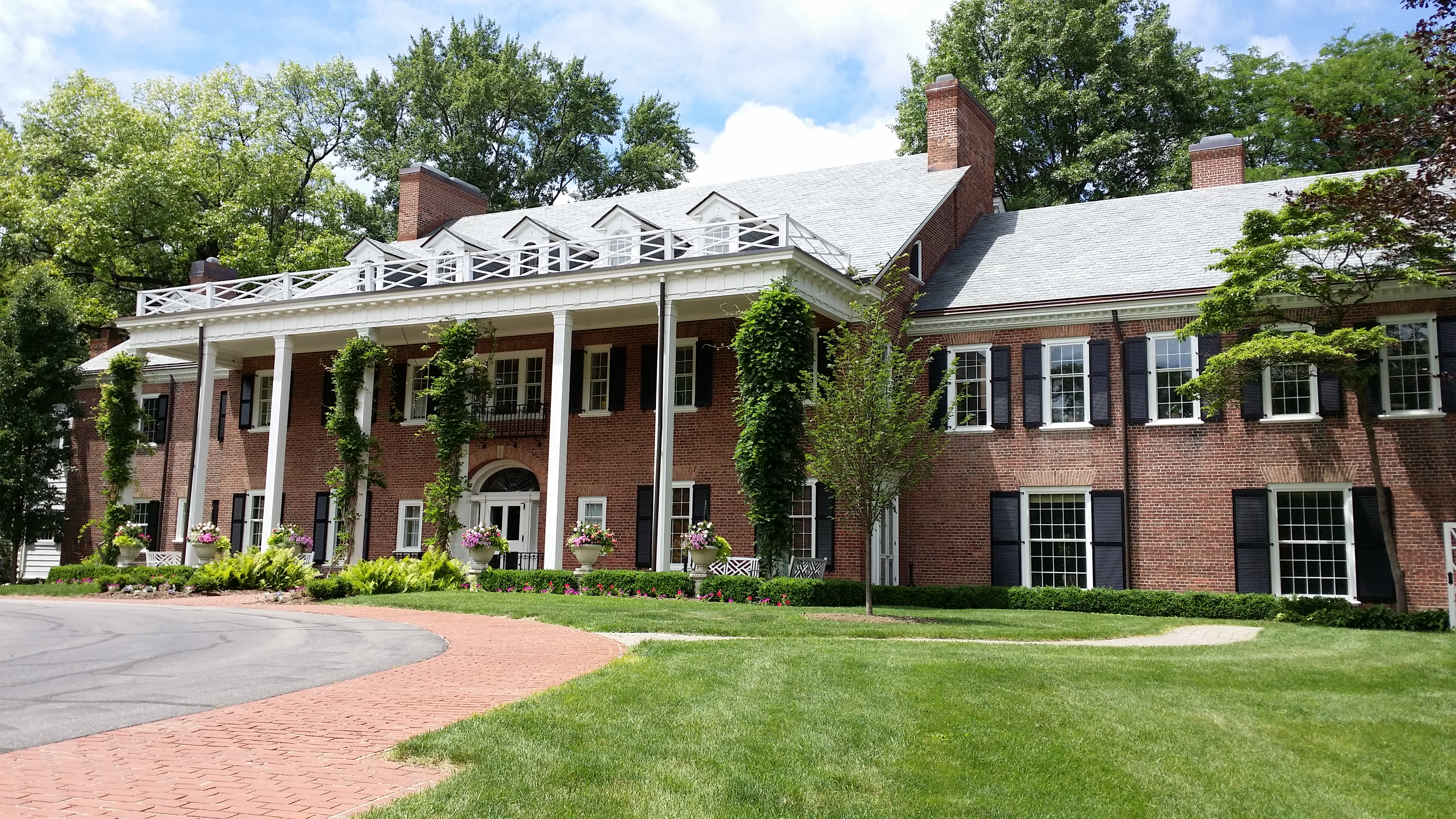
- The Manor House at Wildwood Preserve Metropark
- Interactive map of Wildwood Preserve Metropark
- Type: Nature reserve
- Location: Toledo, Ohio
- Coordinates: 41°41′00″N 83°40′00″W
- Area: 493 acres (200 ha)
- Created: 1975
- Operator: Metroparks Toledo
- Open: Year-round, 7 a.m. until dark daily

Wildwood Preserve Metropark is a nature reserve and historic estate located in Sylvania Township, Ohio. Wildwood is the most-visited of the 19-park Metroparks Toledo district.

Metroparks Toledo purchased the property in 1975 following a citizen-led effort to preserve the grounds of Stranleigh Estate. The Georgian colonial style house and surrounding buildings comprised the family residence of Champion spark plug magnate Robert A. Stranahan Sr., his wife Paige, and their children, including professional golfer Frank Stranahan.

Wildwood features one of the last remaining public, free-admission gardens designed by Ellen Biddle Shipman. The park also features the former Oak Grove School, a one-room schoolhouse built by the Sylvania Board of Education in 1897.

== Wildwood Manor House ==
Built in 1938, the Wildwood Manor House was the home of the original owners. The house, still decorated in a Georgian colonial style, is now partially open to the public for free tours, while other buildings on the property are now used as public restrooms, visitors centers, and offices.

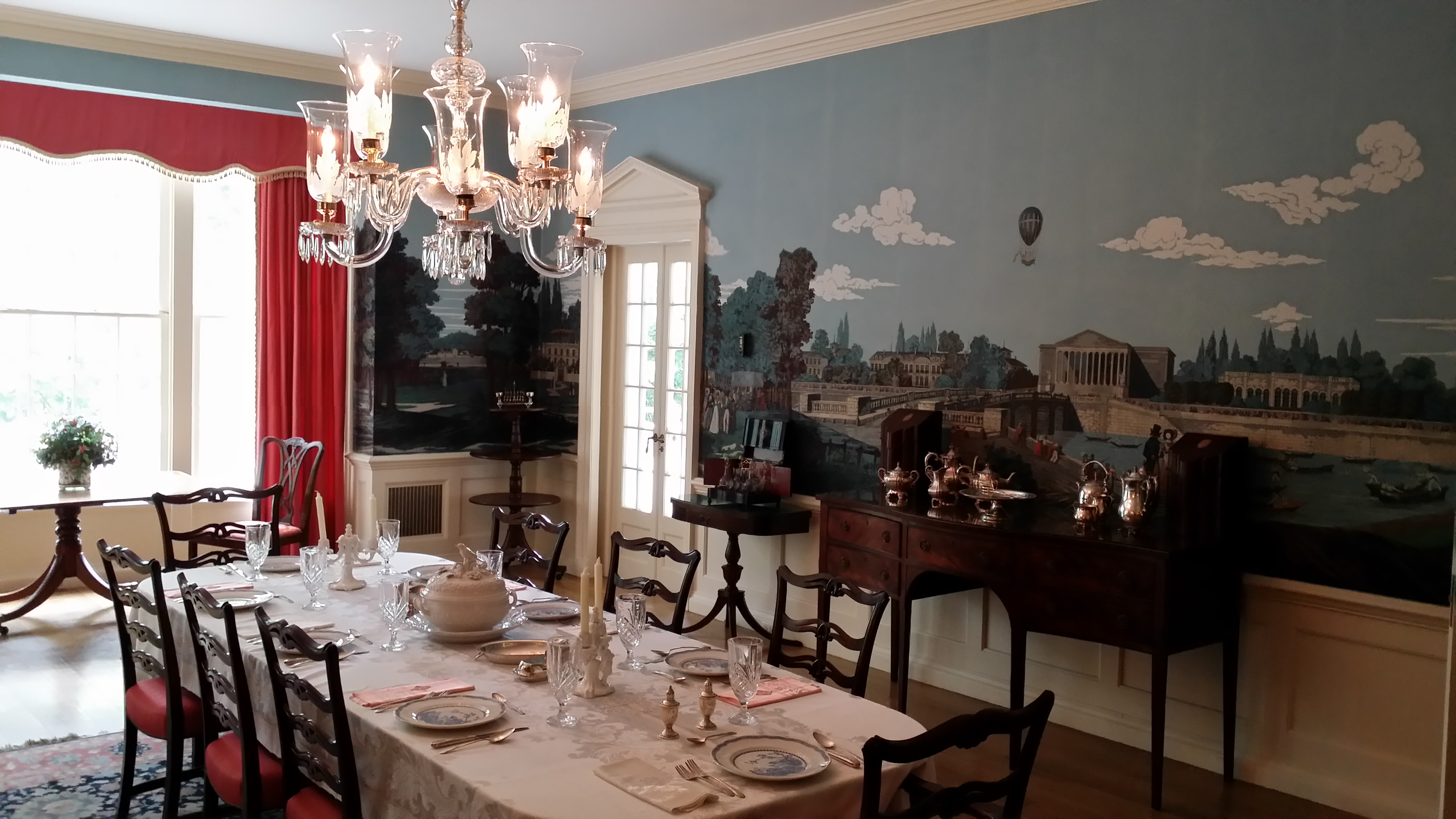
A dining hall with plates set

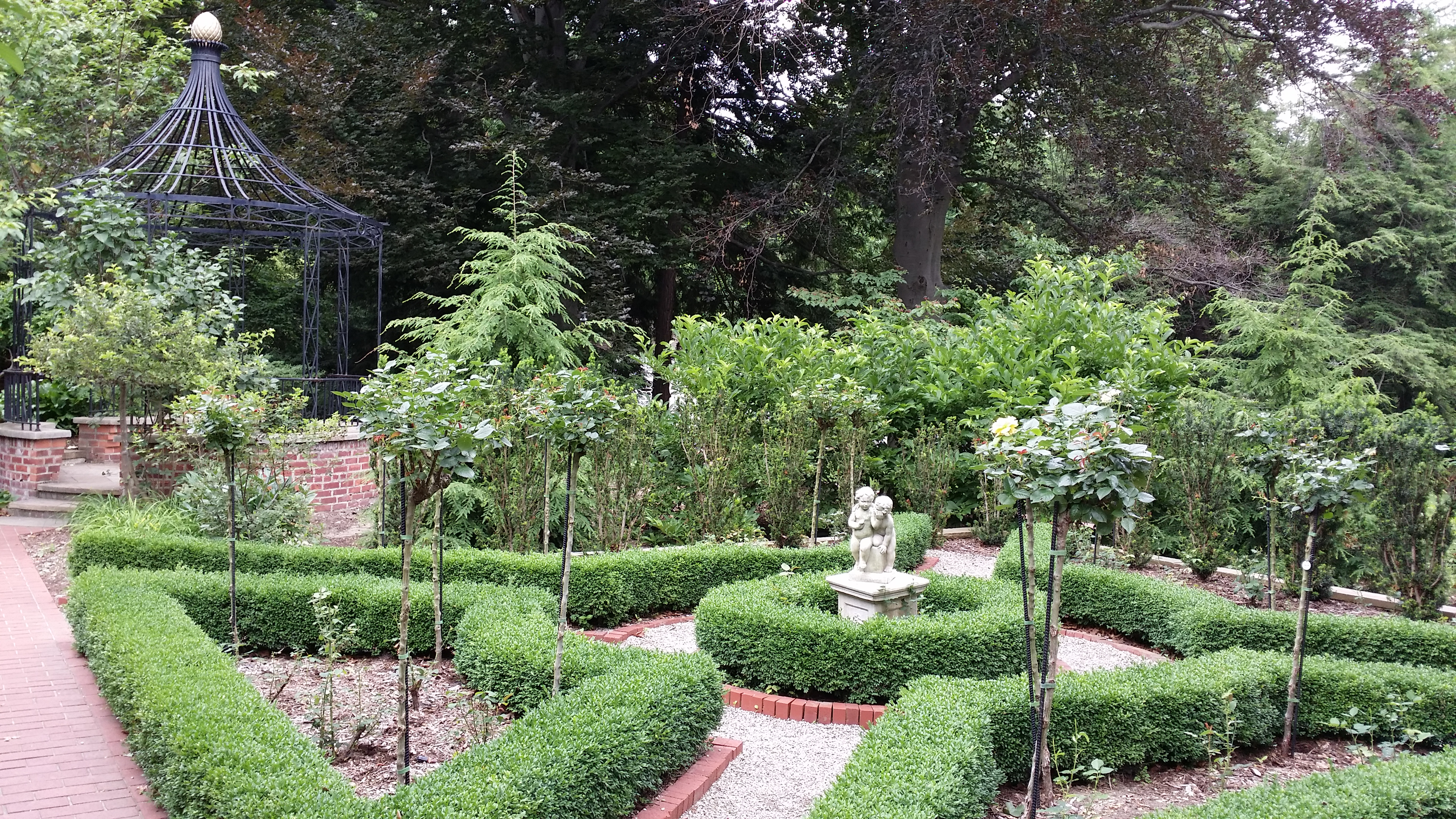
Garden designed by Ellen Biddle Shipman

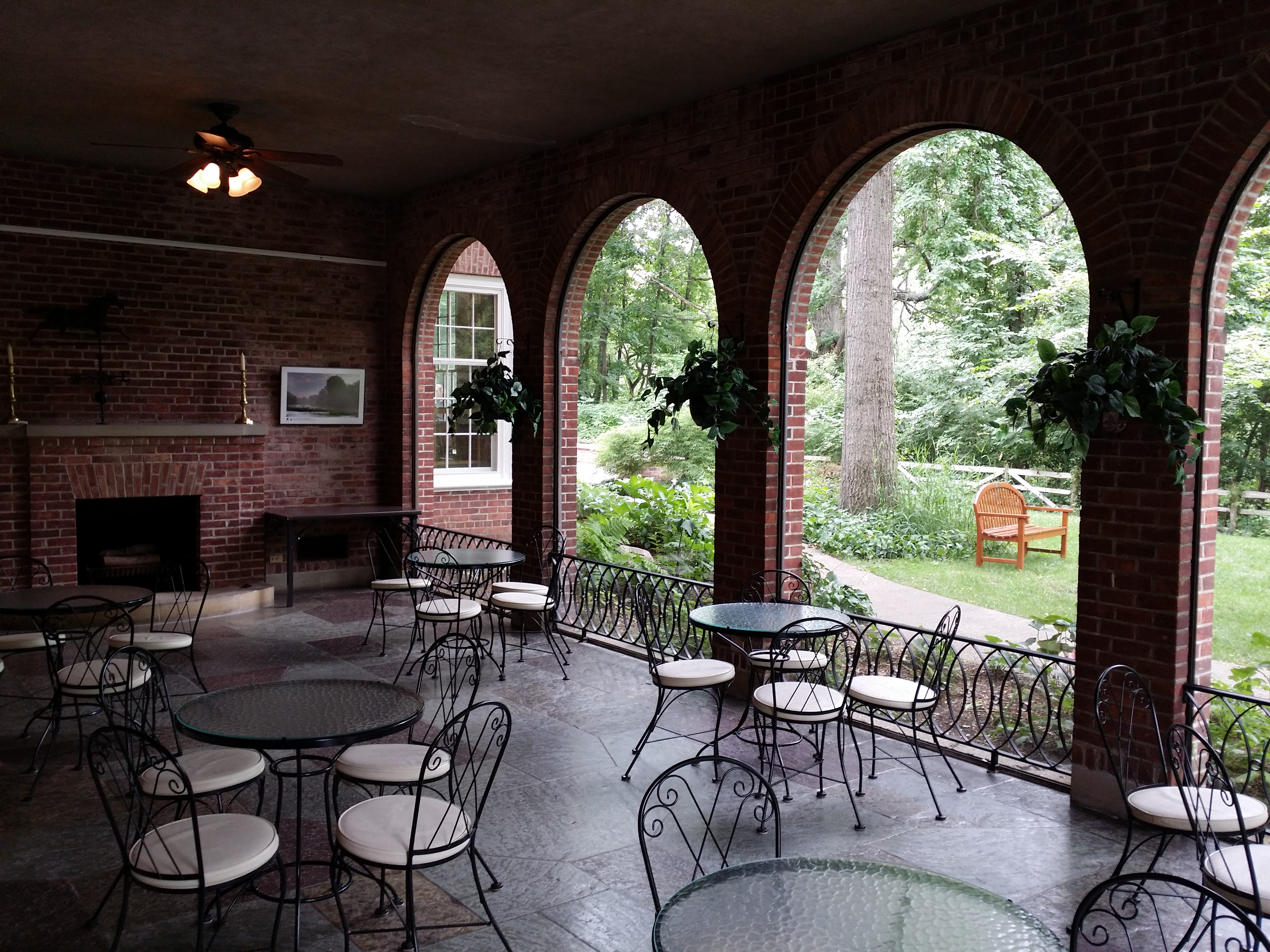
A covered patio

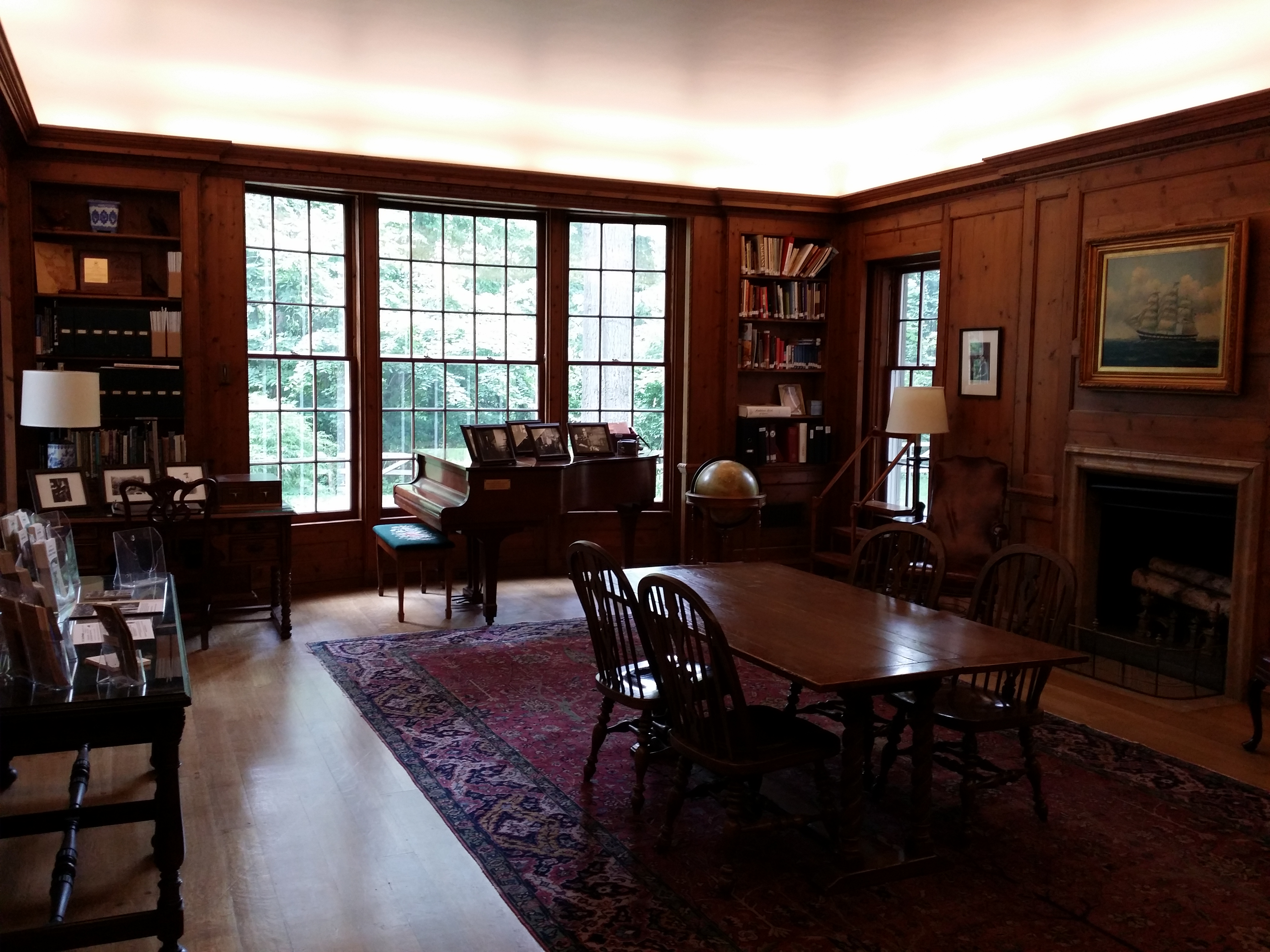
A study with a piano

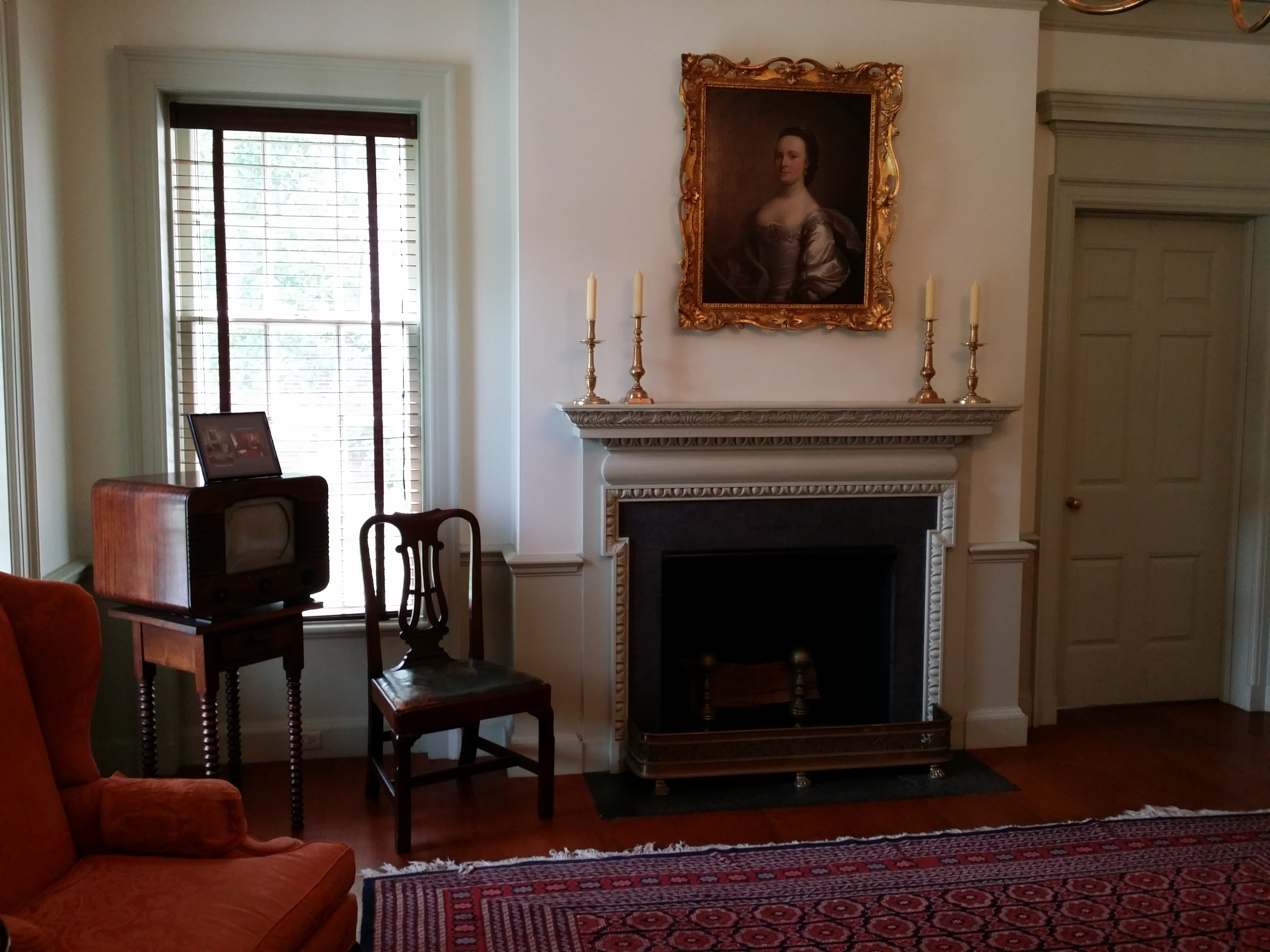
A fireplace and television

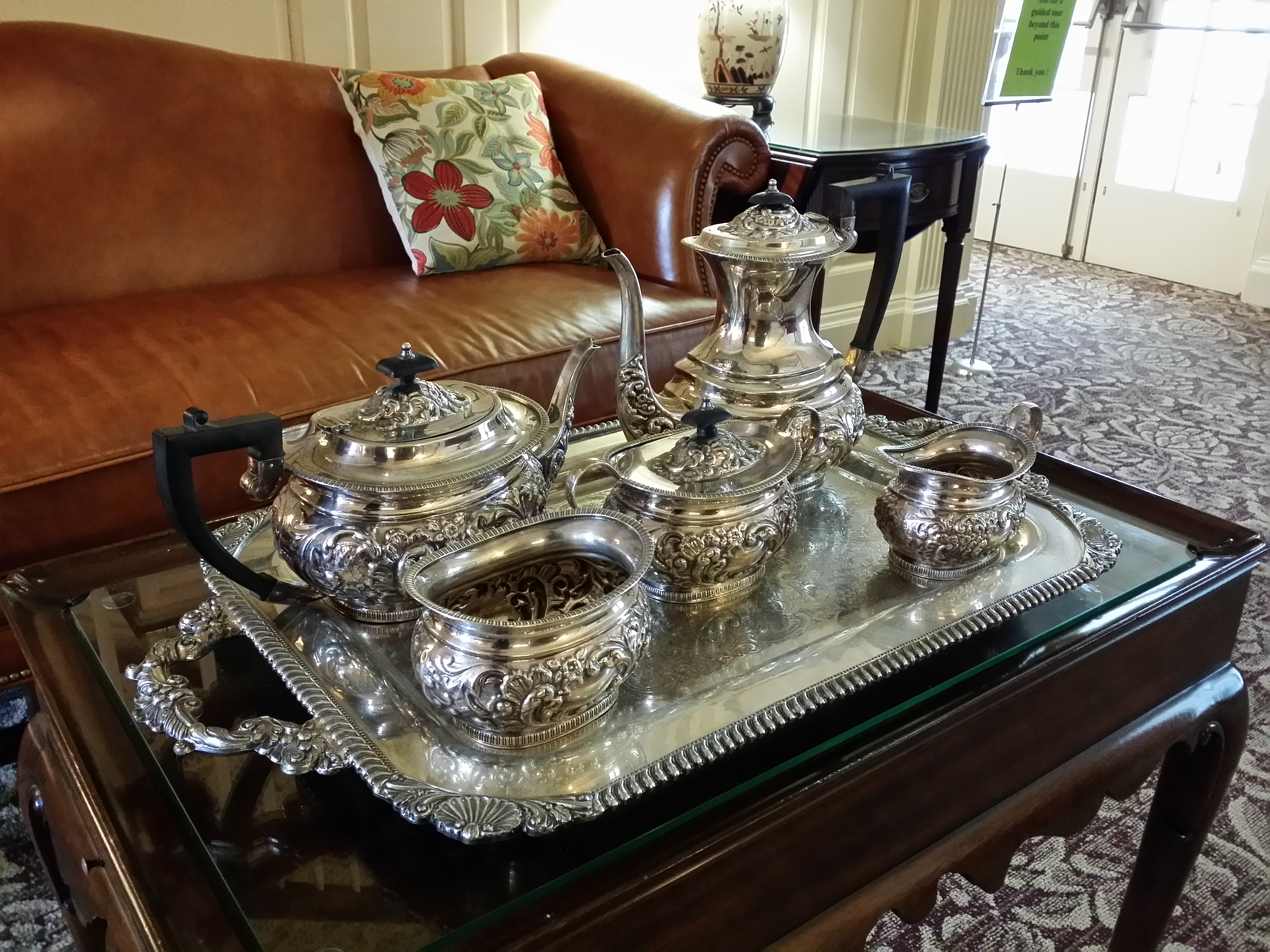
A silverware set in the manor

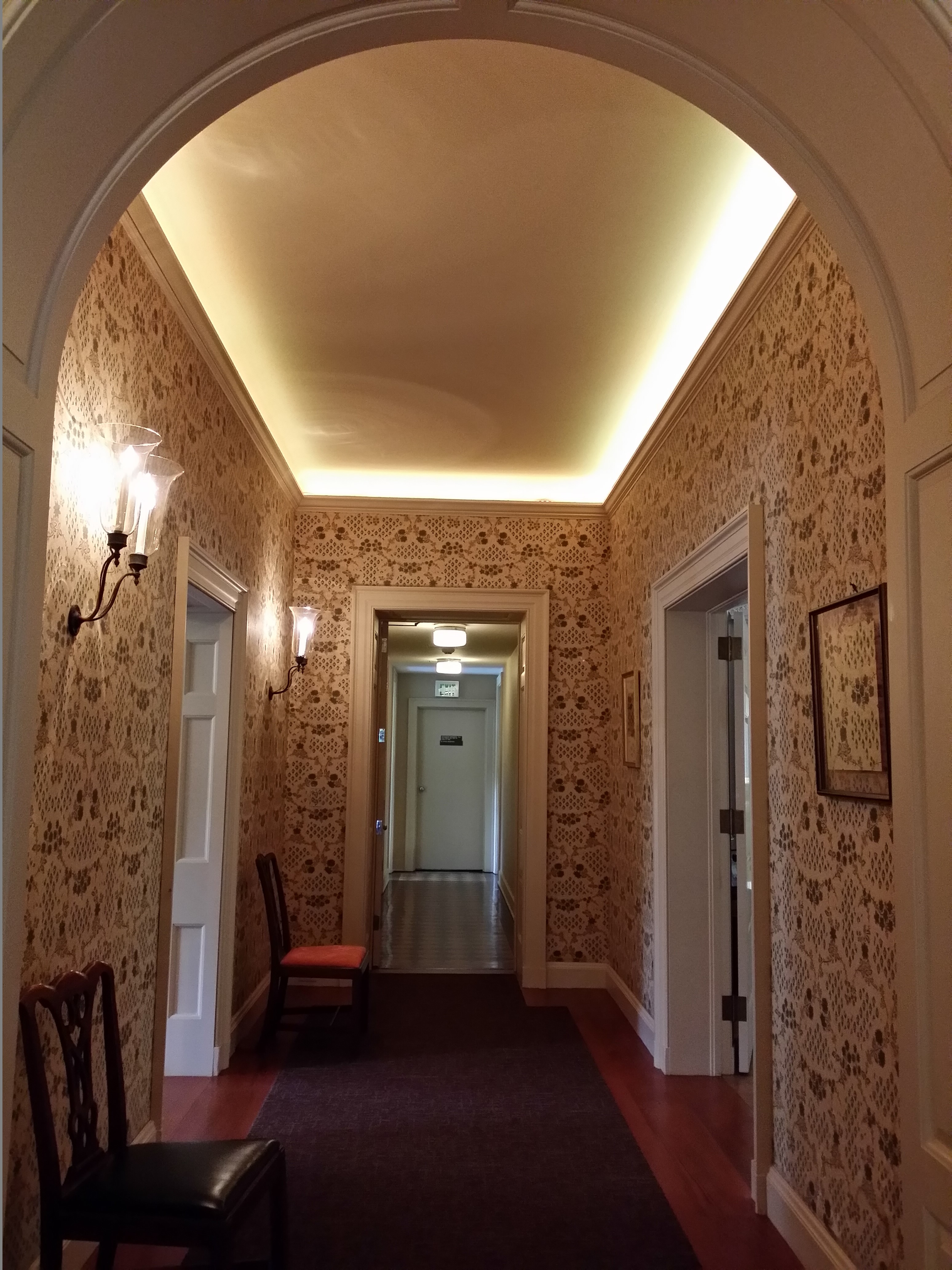
A hallway
