= Khary Campbell =

American football player (born 1979)

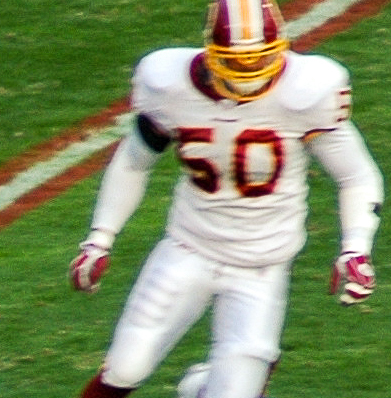
- Campbell with the Redskins in 2005

No. 53, 50
- Position: Linebacker

Personal information
- Born: April 4, 1979 (age 47); Brooklyn, New York, U.S.
- Listed height: 6 ft 2 in (1.88 m)
- Listed weight: 224 lb (102 kg)

Career information
- High school: Sylvania Southview (Sylvania, Ohio)
- College: Bowling Green
- NFL draft: 2002: undrafted

Career history
- Dallas Cowboys (2002)*; New York Jets (2002–2003); Washington Redskins (2004–2008); Houston Texans (2009)
- * Offseason or practice squad member only

Awards and highlights
- Second-team All-MAC (2001)

Career NFL statistics
- Total tackles: 107
- Forced fumbles: 2
- Fumble recoveries: 1
- Stats at Pro Football Reference

Khary K. Campbell /ˈkɛəri/ (born April 4, 1979) is an American former professional football player who was a linebacker in the National Football League (NFL) for the Dallas Cowboys, New York Jets, Washington Redskins and Houston Texans. He played college football for the Bowling Green Falcons.

== Early life ==
Campbell played at Sylvania Southview High School in Sylvania, Ohio, where he was a three-year starter at free safety, while also starting at halfback and wide receiver. As a junior, he registered 83 tackles, 5 interceptions and received first-team All-NLL honors.

As a senior, he compiled 134 tackles, 65 carries for 385 yards, 5 rushing touchdowns, 47 receptions for 717 yards and 6 receiving touchdowns, earning All-Northern Lakes League honors. He also ran the 200 and 400 metres in track.

== College career ==
Campbell accepted a football scholarship from Bowling Green. He played free safety in 2 games as a true freshman, until suffering sprained ligaments in his lower back and being redshirted.

As a redshirt freshman, he started 11 games at outside linebacker in the team's new 4-3 defense, making 75 tackles (third on the team), 3 tackles for loss, 2 forced fumbles and 2 fumble recoveries. As a sophomore, he appeared in 8 games, tallying 50 tackles (fourth on the team).

As a junior, he started 9 games, collecting 95 tackles (led the team), 8 passes defensed and one interception returned for a touchdown, while playing under head coach Urban Meyer.

As a senior, he posted 79 tackles (led the team), 5 tackles for loss, 2 sacks, one interception, 5 forced fumbles, while being named second-team All-MAC selection and a team captain. He finished his college career with 299 tackles, ten forced fumbles, five fumble recoveries and two interceptions.

== Professional career ==
=== Dallas Cowboys ===
Campbell was signed as an undrafted free agent by the Dallas Cowboys after the 2002 NFL draft. He was waived on August 27 and re-signed to the practice squad on September 3.

=== New York Jets ===
On September 24, 2002, he was signed off the Cowboys' practice squad by the New York Jets. He appeared in nine games as a rookie and recorded seven tackles.

As an exclusive-rights free agent in the 2003 offseason, he was re-signed on April 1. He was as a reserve linebacker and a special teams player, registering three tackles in four games, before being waived on September 30.

=== Washington Redskins ===
Campbell signed as a free agent with the Washington Redskins on April 5, 2004. He played nine games and recorded 13 tackles before suffering a torn ACL in his left knee and being placed on the injured reserve list.

The next season, he became a standout special teams player and was named a team captain. He played in 15 games for the Redskins in 2005, recording 15 tackles and also earned the team's Ed Block Courage Award.

He was re-signed to a three-year contract in March 2006, and went on to appear in 14 games, including his first career start. He was placed on the injured reserve list on December 29, after finishing with 21 tackles.

Campbell appeared in all 16 games for the first time in his career in 2007, recording a career-high 34 tackles. He played in 14 more games for the Redskins in 2008, recording 13 tackles. He became an unrestricted free agent in the 2009 offseason, after leading the team 4 straight seasons in special teams tackles (136 tackles).

=== Houston Texans ===
Campbell was signed as a free agent by the Houston Texans on August 17, 2009. He was waived on September 5 and re-signed on September 30 to replace an injured Chaun Thompson. On October 6, he was placed on the injured reserve list with a knee injury that forced him into early retirement.
