= Toledo Islamic Academy =

Private school in Sylvania, Ohio, United States

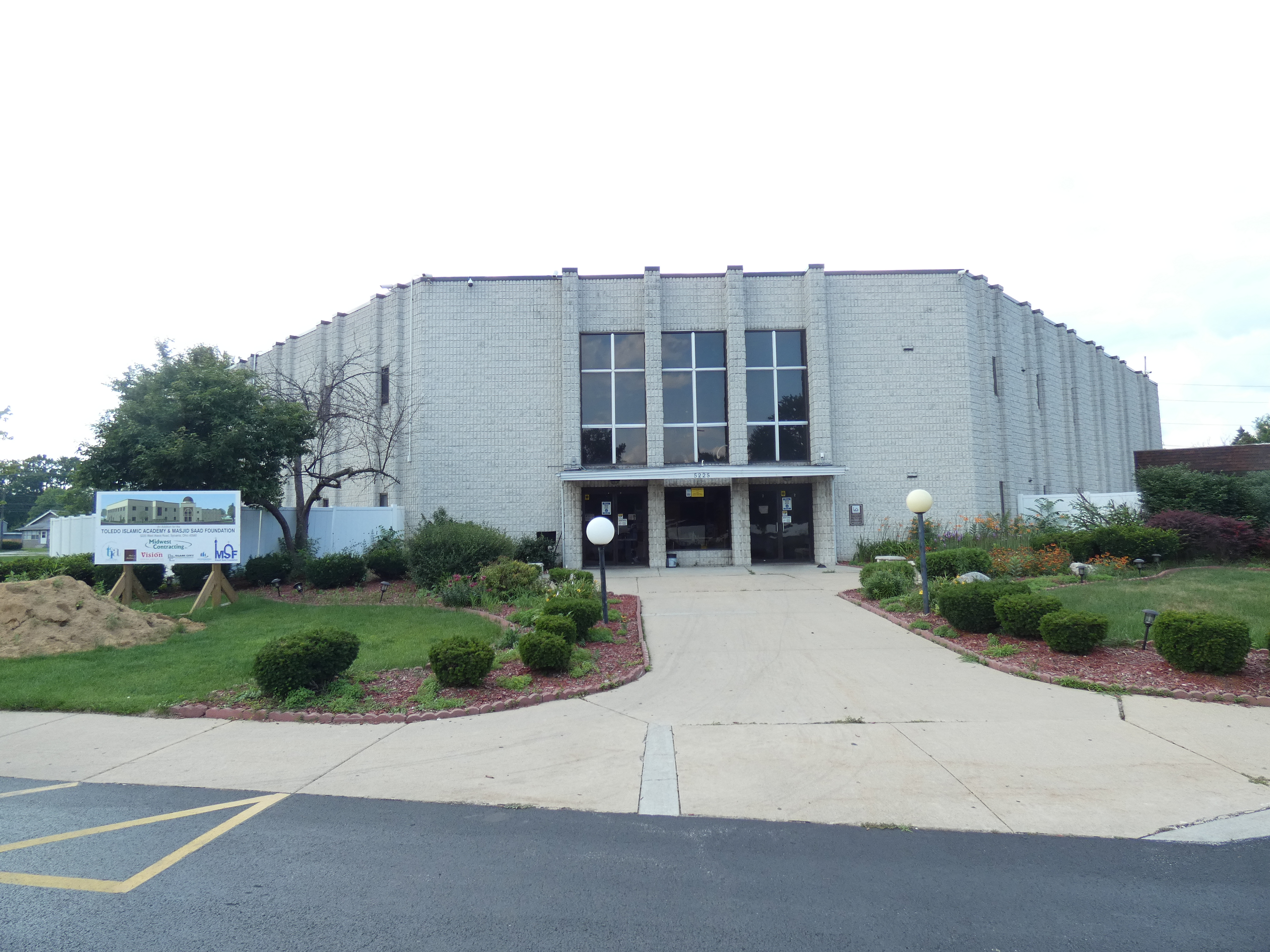
- School's rear entrance

Location
- 5225 West Alexis Road; Sylvania, (Lucas County), Ohio 43560; United States; 41°43′1″N 83°40′7″W

Information
- Type: Private
- Religious affiliation: Islam
- Established: 1995
- Founder: Masjid Saad Foundation
- Oversight: Toledo Islamic Academy Education Committee
- CEEB code: 365063
- Chairperson: Dr. Abdelmanan Alo
- Grades: PK–12
- Enrollment: 183 (2015-16)
- Colors: Blue and Yellow
- Athletics: Cross country, volleyeball, basketball, soccer
- Nickname: TIA Tigers
- Accreditation: Ohio Board of Education; AdvancEd
- Communities served: Northwest Ohio, southeast Michigan
- Affiliation: Sylvania City School District
- Website: https://tiaus.net/

Toledo Islamic Academy (TIA) is a primary and secondary private Islamic charter school in Toledo, Ohio, enrolling students in grades PK–12. It was established in 1995 by the Masjid Saad Foundation, and is accredited by the Ohio Department of Education and AdvancEd.

The school follows Common Core State Standards in its college-preparatory curriculum, with a focus on STEM education. Students study Arabic as a second language in addition to English, and participate in Quran studies in Arabic.

In 2007, the Masjid Saad mosque, where the school had been holding classes since it opened in September 1995, relocated along with the school to the former Cathedral of Praise church in Sylvania, Ohio. The new facility included a gym, playground areas, and a cafeteria.

In 2015, there were 183 students enrolled with a 100% four-year graduation rate, and 100% of students later attending 4-year colleges. Their average ACT score was 23.0, and average SAT score was 2030.

As of 2020, the school principal is Dr. Nabila Gomaa.
