= Luke Fortner =

American football player (born 1998)

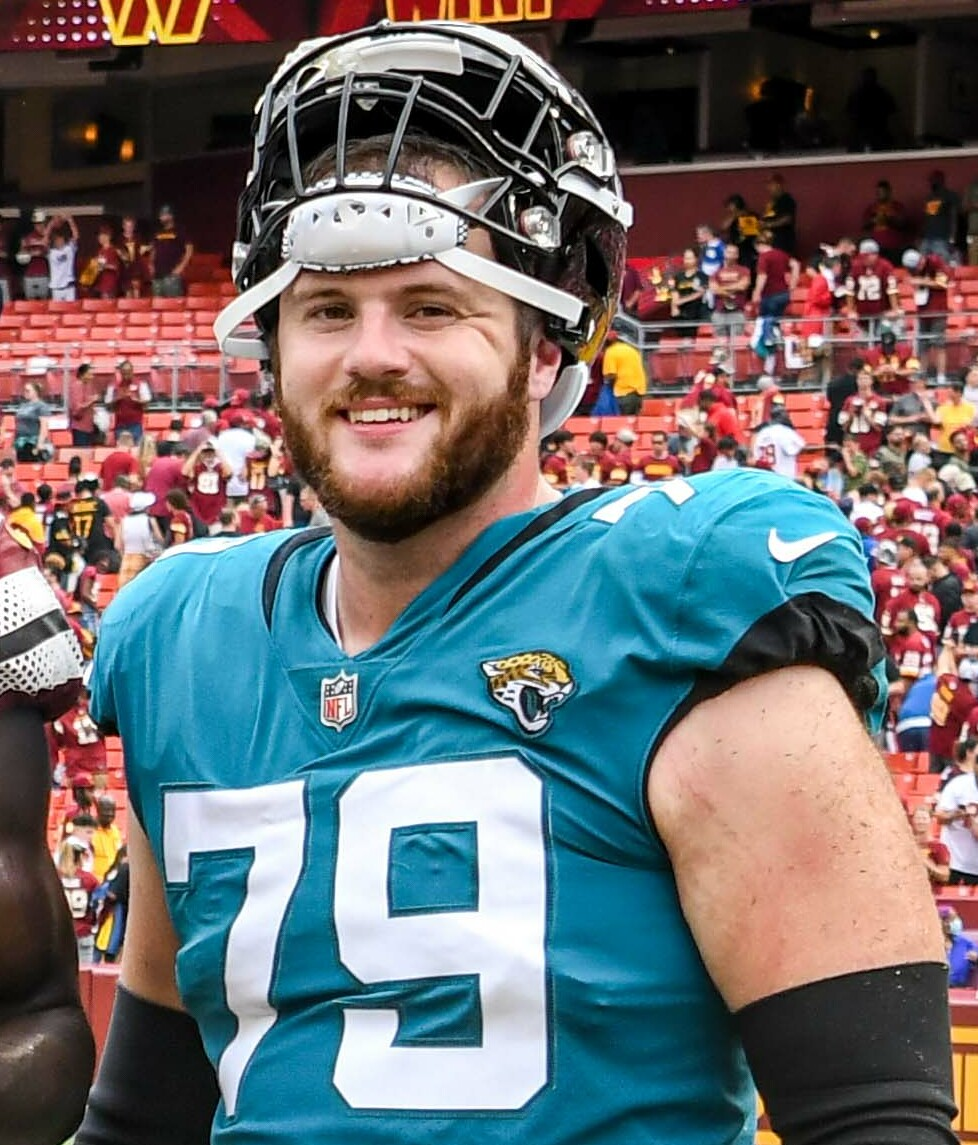
- Fortner with the Jacksonville Jaguars in 2022

No. 77 – Carolina Panthers
- Position: Center
- Roster status: Active

Personal information
- Born: May 15, 1998 (age 28); Cleveland, Ohio, U.S.
- Listed height: 6 ft 4 in (1.93 m)
- Listed weight: 305 lb (138 kg)

Career information
- High school: Sylvania Northview (Sylvania, Ohio)
- College: Kentucky (2016–2021)
- NFL draft: 2022: 3rd round, 65th overall pick

Career history
- Jacksonville Jaguars (2022–2024); New Orleans Saints (2025); Carolina Panthers (2026–present)

Awards and highlights
- First-team All-SEC (2021)

Career NFL statistics as of Week 4, 2026
- Games played: 72
- Games started: 48
- Stats at Pro Football Reference

Luke Fortner (born May 15, 1998) is an American professional football center for the Carolina Panthers of the National Football League (NFL). He played college football for the Kentucky Wildcats and was drafted by the Jacksonville Jaguars in the third round of the 2022 NFL draft.

== Early life ==
Fortner grew up in Sylvania, Ohio and attended Sylvania Northview High School.

== College career ==
Fortner redshirted his true freshman season at the University of Kentucky. He appeared in eight games as a redshirt freshman. Fortner played in 11 of Kentucky's 13 games during his redshirt sophomore season. He became the Wildcats' starting left guard going into his redshirt junior season and started 13 games in 2019 and 10 in Kentucky's COVID-19-shortened 2020 season. Fortner decided to utilize the extra year of eligibility granted to college athletes who played in the 2020 season due to the coronavirus pandemic and return to Kentucky for a sixth season. He moved to center during fall training camp and was named first-team All-Southeastern Conference by the league's coaches. Fortner graduated in May 2022 with three degrees: Bachelor's, master's in mechanical engineering, and MBA.

== Professional career ==
Pre-draft measurables
Height	Weight	Arm length	Hand span	Wingspan	40-yard dash	10-yard split	20-yard split	20-yard shuttle	Three-cone drill	Vertical jump	Broad jump	Bench press
6 ft 4 1/8 in (1.93 m)	307 lb (139 kg)	33 1/8 in (0.84 m)	10 in (0.25 m)	6 ft 8 3/8 in (2.04 m)	5.21 s	1.81 s	2.99 s	4.95 s	7.75 s	29.0 in (0.74 m)	8 ft 6 in (2.59 m)	31 reps
All values from NFL Combine/Pro Day

=== Jacksonville Jaguars ===
Fortner was selected by the Jacksonville Jaguars in the third round, 65th overall, of the 2022 NFL draft. He was named the Jaguars' starting center as a rookie. Fortner operated as a full-time starter in 2022 and 2023, before being used as a backup in 2024; in 51 total appearances for Jacksonville, he recovered one fumble while losing two.

=== New Orleans Saints ===
On August 17, 2025, Fortner was traded to the New Orleans Saints in exchange for defensive tackle Khalen Saunders.

=== Carolina Panthers ===
On March 11, 2026, Fortner signed a one-year, $4.75 million contract with the Carolina Panthers.

== Personal life ==
On November 15, 2025, Fortner married Trudye Lutton.
