= Sylvania Tam-O-Shanter =

Athletic center in Sylvania, Ohio

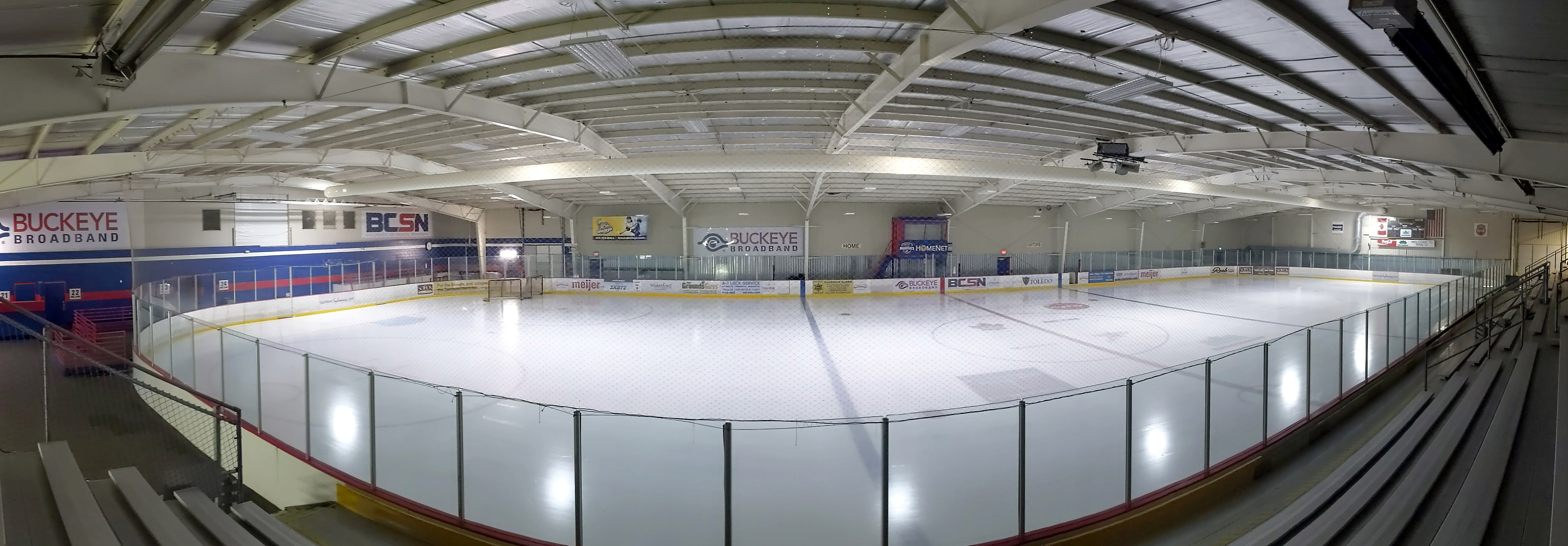
- Rink 2 at Sylvania Tam-O-Shanter
- Interactive map of Sylvania Tam-O-Shanter
- Former names: Tam-O-Shanter Sports Complex
- Location: Sylvania, Ohio
- Coordinates: 41°41′28″N 83°42′48″W
- Operator: Sylvania Joint Area Recreational District
- Main venue: Sylvania Tam-O-Shanter; Capacity: Ice Rink 1: 700; Ice Rink 2: 1100
- Facilities: Sylvania Sports and Exhibition Center

Construction
- Built: 1972
- Renovated: December 1980; September 2007
- Expanded: June 1993; November 2001

Tenants
- Jo-Jo's Pizzeria; The Loft

Website
- https://sylvaniatamoshanter.com/

Sylvania Tam-O-Shanter and the Sylvania Sports and Exhibition Center are a combined, multi-purpose athletics complex and convention center located in Sylvania, Ohio. The original Tam-O-Shanter complex consisted of a single ice rink built in 1972, was expanded upon in 1993 and 2001, and as of 2019 is operated by the Sylvania Joint Area Recreational District.

The Tam-O-Shanter facilities include two ice rinks, two restaurants, an ice skating equipment shop, and a senior center in a neighboring building. The Sports and Exhibition Center contains a 36,000 square foot fieldhouse, used for conventions, trade shows, and sporting events.

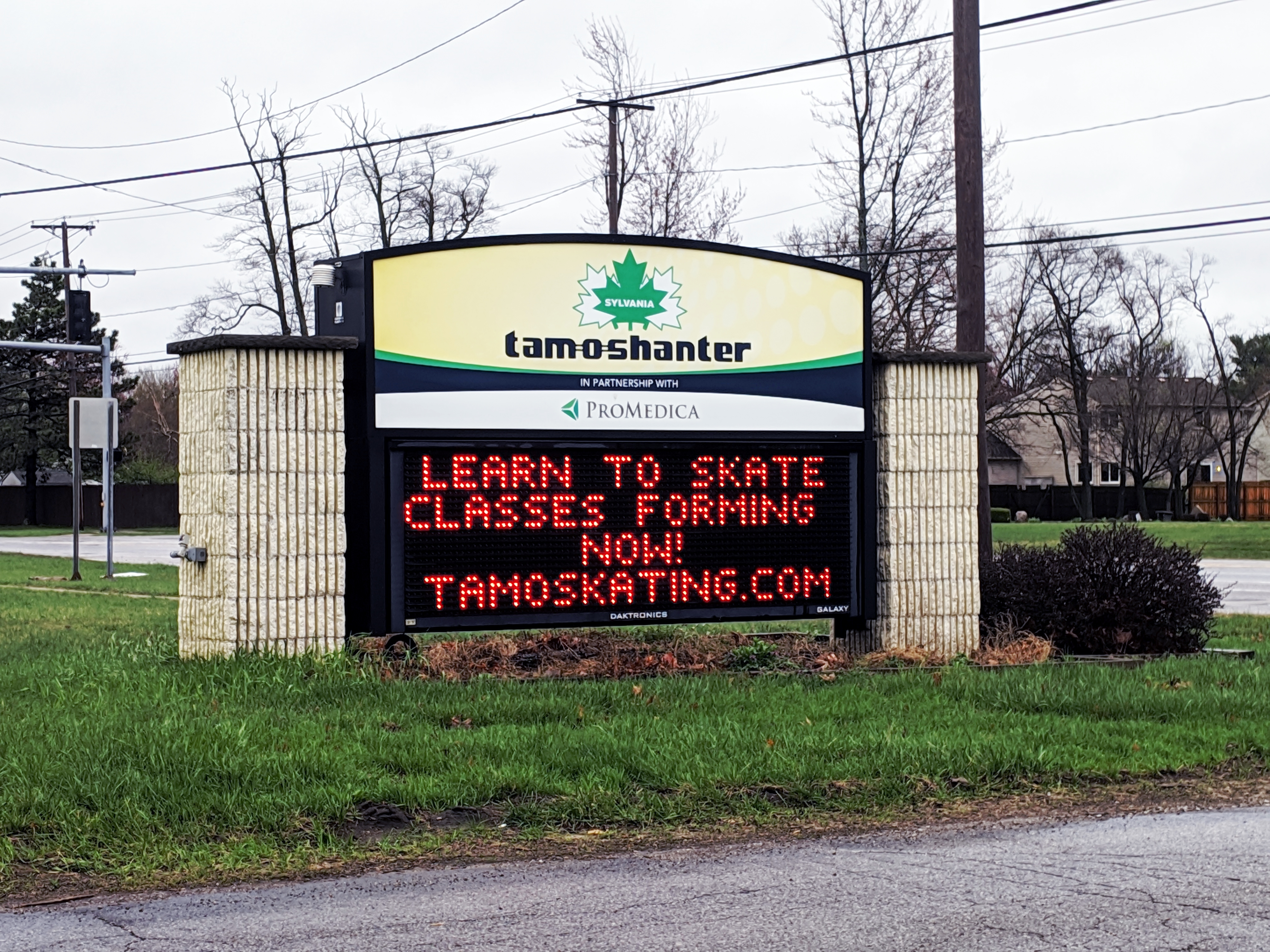
Sylvania Tam-O-Shanter road sign in 2019

== History ==
=== Construction and city purchase ===
In December 1972, the then-named Tam-O-Shanter Sports ice rink was built under the development of a private organization, Tam-O-Shanter Sports, Inc. In January 1980, the city of Sylvania began investigating options for purchasing the facility, at the request of John Crandall, the president of the Sylvania Metropolitan Area Hockey League. He argued that the city could likely purchase the property at less than the $1.1 million being asked. In July of the same year, the chairman of the Board of Sylvania Savings Bank announced that it had acquired the property.

In August 1980, the city announced that it had leased the facility for a period of two years and that it would be run by a commission of nine volunteers. In December that same year, the center held a grand reopening after being remodeled, with the ceremony presided over by Mayor James E. Seney.

In August 1982, the city officially purchased the four acres of land where the property stood from the Sylvania Savings Bank. In June 1993, the Sylvania Area Join Recreation District broke ground on a new expansion to the complex for a second ice rink and a lobby area to join the old and new buildings.

=== Sylvania Sports and Exhibition Center ===
In June 2000, city officials hired architects to prepare plans for third, "dry rink" in the Tam-O-Shanter complex that could be used for indoor soccer, basketball, or other indoor sports, as well as a senior center. The city sold bonds in order to finance the construction of a field house expansion to the main building, while the senior center would be a new building. Construction on the new facilities was completed in 2001, and the expansion was named the Sylvania Sports and Exhibition Center at Tam-O-Shanter. The Blade reported in 2002, approximately one year after the expansion, that nearly 1,000 children and more than 125 adults were regularly using the new facilities for a variety of activities.

In September 2007, renovations were made to the Exhibition Center fieldhouse and Tam-O-Shanter ice rinks, which included new bleachers, a new ceiling to improve energy efficiency, and 27,000 square feet of artificial turf.

=== Children's Wonderland ===
Children's Wonderland is a Christmas-themed exhibit that has been presented annually for 62 years since it premiered on December 6, 1963 at the Lucas County Recreation Center. It features a walk-through collection of Christmas displays, many of which are original to the exhibit and feature simple animatronic figures. It was sold to the Sylvania Recreation District in December 2010, and since then has been displayed each year at Sylvania Tam-O-Shanter in the Exhibition Center fieldhouse. The exhibit was cancelled for the 2020 holiday season due to the COVID-19 pandemic.
