= Sylvania Southview High School =

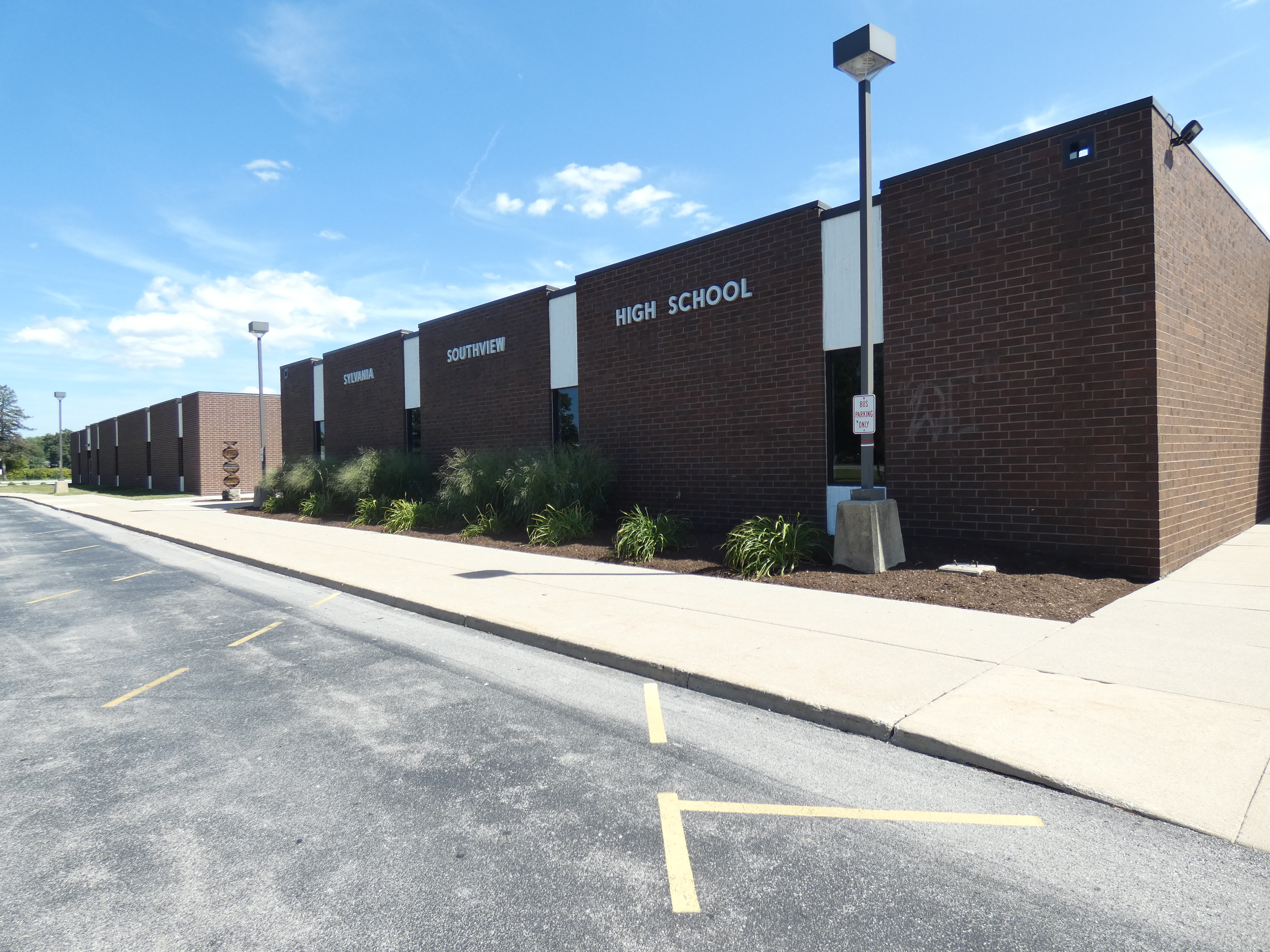
- Portion of the school's front entrance

Location
- 7225 Sylvania Avenue; Sylvania, (Lucas County), Ohio 43560; United States; 41°41′15″N 83°42′59″W

Information
- Type: Public, Coeducational high school
- Opened: 1976
- School district: Sylvania City School District
- Superintendent: Veronica Motley
- CEEB code: 364931
- Principal: Kasey Vens
- Teaching staff: 70.50 (FTE)
- Grades: 9-12
- Student to teacher ratio: 15.93
- Colors: Brown and Orange
- Fight song: Fight On
- Athletics conference: Northern Lakes League
- Mascot: Cougar
- Team name: Cougars
- Rival: Sylvania Northview High School
- Publication: The Catalyst
- Athletic Director: James Huss
- Website: www.sylvaniasouthview.org

Sylvania Southview High School is a public coeducational high school located in Sylvania, Ohio, operated by the Sylvania City School District. Opened in September 1976 as the district's second campus, it was established to relieve overcrowding at the original Sylvania High School, which upon Southview's opening was renamed Sylvania Northview High School. The school enrolls 1,156 students in grades 9 through 12 with a student-to-teacher ratio of 15.93 The school competes as the Cougars in the Northern Lakes League.

The school has produced several notable alumni, including Eric Kripke, creator of Supernatural and The Boys, and NFL players Khary Campbell and Griff Whalen. Its athletics program has claimed five OHSAA state championships in football and cross country, and the Mock Trial program has earned eight state titles and a world championship.

== History ==
By the early 1970s, overcrowding at Sylvania High School (now Sylvania Northview High School) had become severe enough that the district was using the old Burnham building as an overflow campus, requiring students to walk between buildings for different classes. In 1973, the school board authorized the purchase of 50 acres on Sylvania Avenue for $180,000 to build a second high school. Southview opened in September 1976. Upon its opening, the original Sylvania High School was renamed Sylvania Northview High School to distinguish the two campuses.

== Academics ==
Southview is accredited by the Ohio Department of Education and is part of the Sylvania City School District, overseen by superintendent Dr. Veronica Motley. It is an AP Capstone school. The school offers Advanced Placement courses and a Gifted & Talented program.

== Extracurriculars ==
=== Speech and Debate ===
Southview's Speech and Debate team competes through the National Speech and Debate Association and the Ohio Speech and Debate Association. Southview has co-hosted the largest Speech and Debate tournament in the state of Ohio jointly with Sylvania Northview High School.

=== Mock Trial ===
Southview's Mock Trial program has won eight Ohio state championships under coach Dennis Lyle. In October 2013, the team competed at the Empire International Mock Trial Invitational in New York City, finishing first internationally after entering the competition ranked 35th of 40 teams. During the 2013–2014 season, the team also finished third at the national competition among 46 teams, and placed eighth globally at the Empire Mock Trial competition.

=== Band and Orchestra ===
The Southview band program includes a Marching Band, Concert Band, Symphonic Band, and Jazz Band. The orchestra program participates in the Ohio Music Education Association Solo and Ensemble contest, the Northwest Ohio Regional Orchestra, and the Ohio All-State Orchestra. Band students also participate in OMEA Solo & Ensemble and large group contests.

== Athletics ==
Southview competes in the Northern Lakes League (NLL) across a variety of sports as the Cougars. The school's primary rival is Sylvania Northview High School. The boys' ice hockey team competes in the Northwest Hockey Conference rather than the NLL.

Southview is designated as a Division I school and compete in all sports in the Northern Lakes League, with the exception of the boys' ice hockey team, who compete in the Northwest Hockey Conference.

=== State Championships ===
The school has won the following Ohio High School Athletic Association state championships:

- Football – 2008
- Boys' Cross Country – 1987, 1991, 1992
- Girls' Cross Country – 1994,2026
- Cougarettes Dance Team – 2009 (Pom Division), Orange Bowl Halftime in Miami, Florida '11, 2011 (Jazz), and 2012 (Pom and Jazz)

=== NLL Championships ===
As of 2025–26, Southview has accumulated NLL championships across the following sports, per NLL records:

- Boys cross country – 1984, 1985, 1986, 1987, 1988, 1989, 1990, 1991, 1992, 1993, 1994, 1995, 2000 (13 titles)
- Girls cross country – 1985, 1987, 1988, 1989, 1990, 1991, 1992, 1993, 1994, 1995, 1996, 1997, 2001, 2007, 2025 (15 titles)
- Football – 1981, 1992, 1997, 1998, 1999, 2003, 2004, 2005, 2007, 2008, 2009, 2010, 2011, 2023 (14 titles)
- Boys golf – 1997, 1998, 1999, 2024 (4 titles)
- Girls golf – 2006, 2010, 2024, 2025 (4 titles)
- Boys soccer – 1983, 1985, 1987, 1988, 1989, 1992, 1993, 2011, 2025 (9 titles)
- Girls soccer – 2022, 2024 (2 titles)
- Girls tennis – 1977, 1978, 1982, 1983, 1986, 1988, 1990, 1991, 1992, 1993, 1994, 1995, 2009 (13 titles)
- Volleyball – 2012 (1 title)
- Boys basketball – 1977, 1983, 1987, 2004, 2008, 2009, 2015, 2018, 2021, 2024, 2025, 2026 (12 titles)
- Girls basketball – 1979, 1990, 1991, 1994, 1995, 1996, 1997, 2006, 2019 (9 titles)
- Boys swimming – 2010, 2011, 2016, 2018 (4 titles)
- Girls swimming – 2010 (1 title)
- Wrestling – 1981, 1982, 2006 (3 titles)
- Baseball – 1977, 1997, 1998, 2009, 2010 (5 titles)
- Softball – 2002, 2003, 2004 (3 titles)
- Boys tennis – 1977, 1980, 1982, 1983, 1984, 1985, 1986, 1987, 1991, 1992, 1998, 1999, 2013, 2014, 2024, 2025 (16 titles)
- Boys track and field – 1988, 1989, 1990, 1992, 1993, 1994, 1995, 1996, 2003, 2004, 2005, 2007, 2011, 2012, 2013, 2014, 2023 (17 titles)
- Girls track and field – 1994, 1995, 1996 (3 titles)

== Notable alumni ==
- Khary Campbell, former NFL player
- Eric Kripke, television writer, director, and producer
- Griff Whalen, former NFL player
- Charles Latshaw, orchestra conductor, music director of the Grand Junction Symphony Orchestra and the Flagstaff Symphony Orchestra
- Nate Hall, former NFL player
- Heather Walker, Suncoast Emmy Award winner
