= Growth and Change =

- Discipline: Regional and Urban Planning
- Language: English
- Edited by: John Carruthers, Natasha Duncan, Canfei He, and Shengjun Zhu

Publication details
- History: 1970-present
- Publisher: Wiley-Blackwell
- Frequency: Quarterly
- Impact factor: 2.9 (2023)

Standard abbreviations
- ISO 4: Growth Change

Indexing
- ISSN: 0017-4815 (print); 1468-2257 (web)

Links
- Journal homepage; Online access; Online archive

Growth and Change: A Journal of Urban and Regional Policy is a quarterly peer-reviewed academic journal published by Wiley-Blackwell. The journal was established in 1970. Its current editors are John Carruthers (Cornell University), Natasha Duncan (Purdue University), Canfei He (Peking University), and Shengjun Zhu (Peking University). The journal covers economics, geography, regional science, urban and regional planning, public finance, and rural sociology.

According to the Journal Citation Reports, the journal has a two-year impact factor of 2.9 in 2023. According to the Scopus database the journal has a four-year CiteScore of 6.4 in 2023.
