= Sylvania City School District =

School district in Ohio, United States

Address
- 4747 North Holland Sylvania Road Sylvania, Ohio, 43560; United States
- Coordinates: 41°42′41″N 83°42′12″W

District information
- Type: Public
- Grades: PK–12
- Schools: 13
- NCES District ID: 3904487

Students and staff
- Students: 7,700 (2025–2026)
- Teachers: 478.36 (on an FTE basis) (2025–2026)
- Staff: 672.75 (on an FTE basis) (2025–2026)
- Student–teacher ratio: 16.10 (2025–2026)

Other information
- Website: www.sylvania.k12.oh.us

Sylvania City School District is a school district in Northwest Ohio. The school district serves students who live in the city of Sylvania, and Sylvania Township in Lucas County. The superintendent is Tim Zieroff.

== Schools ==
=== Grades 9-12 ===
- Sylvania Northview High School
- Sylvania Southview High School

=== Grades 6-8 ===
- Arbor Hills Junior High School
- McCord Junior High School
- Timberstone Junior High School

=== Grades K-5 ===
- Central Trail Elementary
- Highland Elementary
- Hill View Elementary
- Maplewood Elementary
- Stranahan Elementary
- Sylvan Elementary
- Whiteford Elementary
