= Sylvania, Ohio =

City in the United States

- City
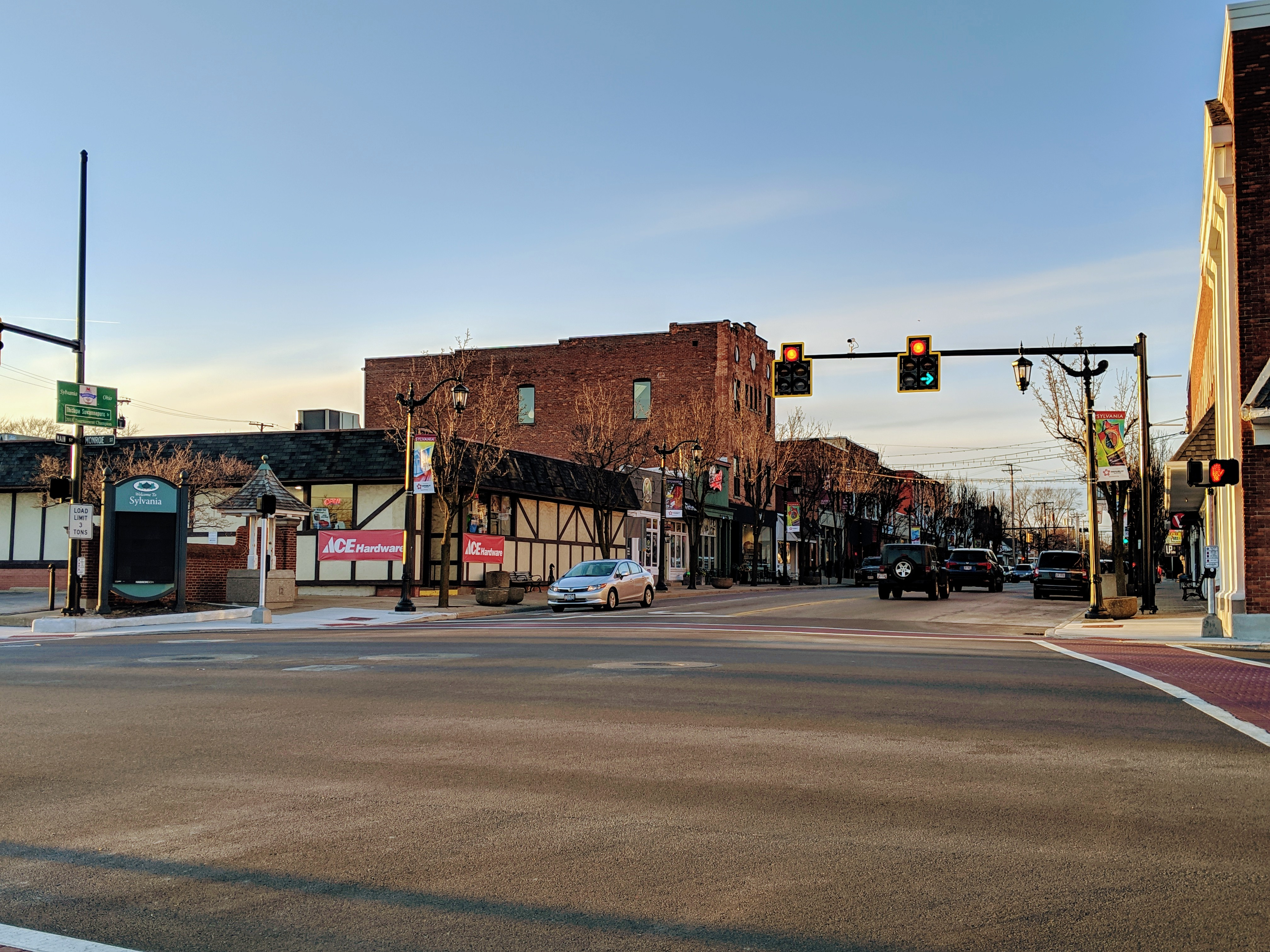
- Main Street, downtown Sylvania

- Flag Seal
- Nickname: City of Trees
- Motto: "Serving the Community"
- Interactive map of Sylvania, Ohio
- Location within Ohio Location within the United States
- Coordinates: 41°42′37″N 83°42′34″W
- Country: United States
- State: Ohio
- County: Lucas

Government
  - Mayor: Mark Frye (R)

Area
  - Total: 6.72 sq mi (17.40 km^{2})
  - Land: 6.66 sq mi (17.26 km^{2})
  - Water: 0.054 sq mi (0.14 km^{2})
- Elevation: 646 ft (197 m)

Population (2020)
  - Total: 19,011
  - Density: 2,852.3/sq mi (1,101.26/km^{2})
- Time zone: UTC-5 (Eastern (EST))
  - Summer (DST): UTC-4 (EDT)
- ZIP code: 43560
- Area code: 419 567
- FIPS code: 39-76022
- GNIS feature ID: 2396020
- Website: www.cityofsylvania.com

Sylvania is a city in Lucas County, Ohio, United States. The population was 19,011 at the 2020 census. Sylvania is a suburb of Toledo, and encompassed by Sylvania Township. Its northern border is the southern border of the state of Michigan.

The name "Sylvania" is borrowed from the Latin sylvan or sylva, meaning "forest land", owing to the dense forests that once made up the region, part of the Great Black Swamp.

== History ==
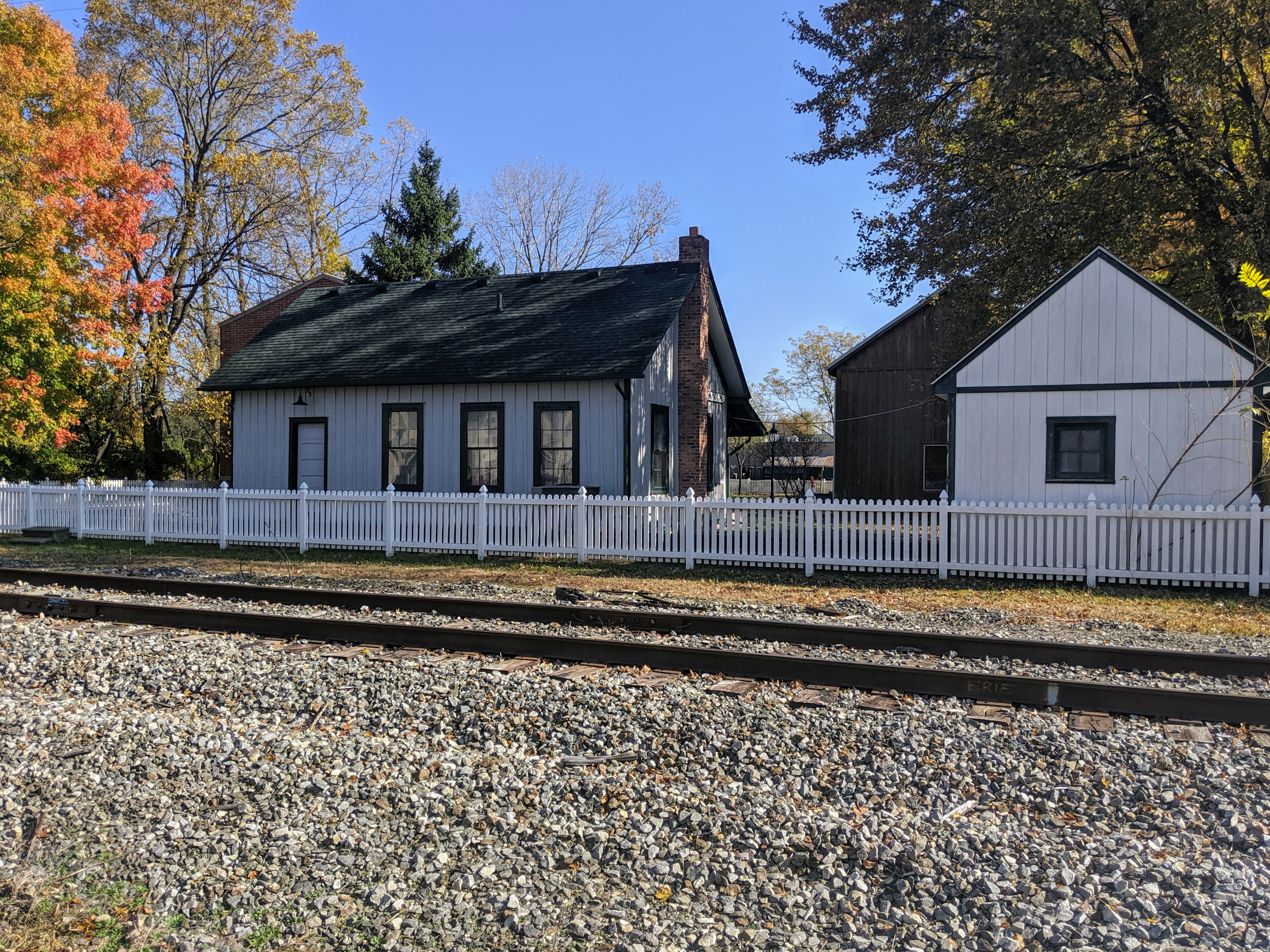
The original Sylvania railroad depot, along the Erie & Kalamazoo Railroad, now part of the Sylvania Historical Village

General David White is considered the founder of Sylvania as the first pioneer settler and town supervisor, originally from Palmyra, New York. In 1832, White was given the title of General (possibly after services rendered during the War of 1812), which allowed him to explore the western Lake Erie region. In realizing the potential of some available land to the north of Maumee, Ohio, a notable port city at the time, he acquired a title to the land and built a log cabin at what would eventually be the corner of Summit and Monroe streets near downtown Sylvania.

Prior to White's acquisition, the land was a part of Port Lawrence Township, Monroe County, Michigan. Over the course of several years, White, along with his associate, Judge William Wilson, purchased a total of 1,920 acres (780 ha) of Port Lawrence and surrounding land in what would eventually become Sylvania, and 1,720 acres (700 ha) of what would become Whiteford Township, Michigan, where he also served as the first town supervisor. The relationship between White and Wilson did not last, and when the boundary dispute that lead to the largely bloodless Toledo War began in 1834, they began splitting the lands they had purchased, platting their own towns. That year, White established the first area school in Whiteford, and platted the township there one year later in 1835. Wilson presented the original plat for Sylvania in June 1836, with the town of Whiteford directly adjacent.

Throughout the 1830s and 1840s, rail transportation saw significant expansion throughout the Great Lakes region. In 1833, the Erie and Kalamazoo Railroad was chartered as part of the Lake Shore and Michigan Southern Railway, running from former Port Lawrence, Michigan (now Toledo, Ohio), to the mouth of the Kalamazoo River at Lake Michigan. Trains were at first pulled by horse until the first steam locomotive was installed in 1837. Sylvania built its own railroad depot along the Erie-Kalamazoo Railroad in 1858. While the depot is no longer in operation, the original station building exists as an exhibit in the Sylvania Historical Village, still next to the railroad which remains in use.

Sylvania was incorporated in 1867. A post office called Sylvania has been in operation since 1859.

== Geography ==
Sylvania is located approximately 10 miles (16 km) west-northwest of Toledo. According to the United States Census Bureau, the city has a total area of 6.68 square miles (17.30 km^{2}), of which 6.63 square miles (17.17 km^{2}) are land and 0.05 square miles (0.13 km^{2}) are water.

The city lies at the junction of two creeks: Ottawa Creek, flowing south from the community of Ottawa Lake, Michigan, about four miles north of the city, and Ten Mile Creek, a tributary of Ottawa Creek running about 30 miles (48 km) from the west, which becomes the Ottawa River and empties into the Maumee River.

The city is built on large shale deposits, which over hundreds of years have been mined in quarries to make concrete, cement and other stone products. Silica shale from the region is renowned among paleontologists for its high-quality fossils from the early Devonian period.

== Demographics ==
Historical population
Census	Pop.	Note	%±
1880	532		—
1890	545		2.4%
1900	617		13.2%
1910	1,002		62.4%
1920	1,222		22.0%
1930	2,108		72.5%
1940	2,199		4.3%
1950	2,433		10.6%
1960	5,187		113.2%
1970	12,031		131.9%
1980	15,556		29.3%
1990	17,301		11.2%
2000	18,670		7.9%
2010	18,971		1.6%
2020	19,011		0.2%
2025 (est.)	18,883		−0.7%

=== 2020 census ===
As of the 2020 census, Sylvania had a population of 19,011. The median age was 41.5 years; 21.4% of residents were under the age of 18 and 21.6% were 65 years of age or older. For every 100 females there were 89.2 males, and for every 100 females age 18 and over there were 86.4 males.

100.0% of residents lived in urban areas, while 0.0% lived in rural areas.

There were 7,754 households in Sylvania, of which 27.9% had children under the age of 18 living in them. Of all households, 50.5% were married-couple households, 15.2% were households with a male householder and no spouse or partner present, and 28.6% were households with a female householder and no spouse or partner present. About 30.7% of all households were made up of individuals and 15.4% had someone living alone who was 65 years of age or older.

There were 8,191 housing units, of which 5.3% were vacant. The homeowner vacancy rate was 1.6% and the rental vacancy rate was 5.3%.

Racial composition as of the 2020 census
Race	Number	Percent
White	16,759	88.2%
Black or African American	596	3.1%
American Indian and Alaska Native	29	0.2%
Asian	427	2.2%
Native Hawaiian and Other Pacific Islander	7	0.0%
Some other race	156	0.8%
Two or more races	1,037	5.5%
Hispanic or Latino (of any race)	783	4.1%

=== 2010 census ===
As of the census of 2010, there were 18,971 people, 7,642 households, and 5,092 families residing in the city. The population density was 2,926.7 inhabitants per square mile (1,130.0/km^{2}). There were 8,165 housing units at an average density of 1,260.0 per square mile (486.5/km^{2}). The racial makeup of the city was 92.4% White, 2.7% African American, 0.1% Native American, 2.3% Asian, 0.1% Pacific Islander, 0.7% from other races, and 1.7% from two or more races. Hispanic or Latino of any race were 2.9% of the population.

There were 7,642 households, of which 31.3% had children under the age of 18 living with them, 53.0% were married couples living together, 10.1% had a female householder with no husband present, 3.5% had a male householder with no wife present, and 33.4% were non-families. 28.7% of all households were made up of individuals, and 12.8% had someone living alone who was 65 years of age or older. The average household size was 2.43 and the average family size was 3.02.

The median age in the city was 42.7 years. 23.6% of residents were under the age of 18; 7.8% were between the ages of 18 and 24; 21.5% were from 25 to 44; 29.9% were from 45 to 64; and 17.2% were 65 years of age or older. The gender makeup of the city was 47.3% male and 52.7% female.

=== 2000 census ===
Largest ancestries (2000)	Percent
German	32.8%
Irish	15.7%
Polish	10.7%
Italian	6.2%
American	4.9%

As of the census of 2000, there were 18,670 people, 7,151 households, and 5,070 families residing in the city. The population density was 3,223.2 inhabitants per square mile (1,244.5/km^{2}). There were 7,392 housing units at an average density of 1,276.2 per square mile (492.7/km^{2}). The racial makeup of the city was 95.20% White, 1.00% African American, 0.10% Native American, 2.10% Asian, 0.01% Pacific Islander, 0.64% from other races, and 0.96% from two or more races. Hispanic or Latino of any race were 1.63% of the population. The city has a significant Jewish community.

There were 7,151 households, out of which 37.2% had children under the age of 18 living with them, 59.8% were married couples living together, 8.7% had a female householder with no husband present, and 29.1% were non-families. 25.7% of all households were made up of individuals, and 11.2% had someone living alone who was 65 years of age or older. The average household size was 2.59 and the average family size was 3.16.

In the city, the population was spread out, with 28.2% under the age of 18, 6.7% from 18 to 24, 26.7% from 25 to 44, 25.0% from 45 to 64, and 13.3% who were 65 years of age or older. The median age was 38 years. For every 100 females, there were 90.7 males. For every 100 females age 18 and over, there were 86.6 males.

The median income for a household in the city was $57,358, and the median income for a family was $73,947. Males had a median income of $52,892 versus $34,583 for females. The per capita income for the city was $28,163. About 3.7% of families and 4.2% of the population were below the poverty line, including 4.2% of those under age 18 and 3.9% of those age 65 or over.

== Arts and culture ==
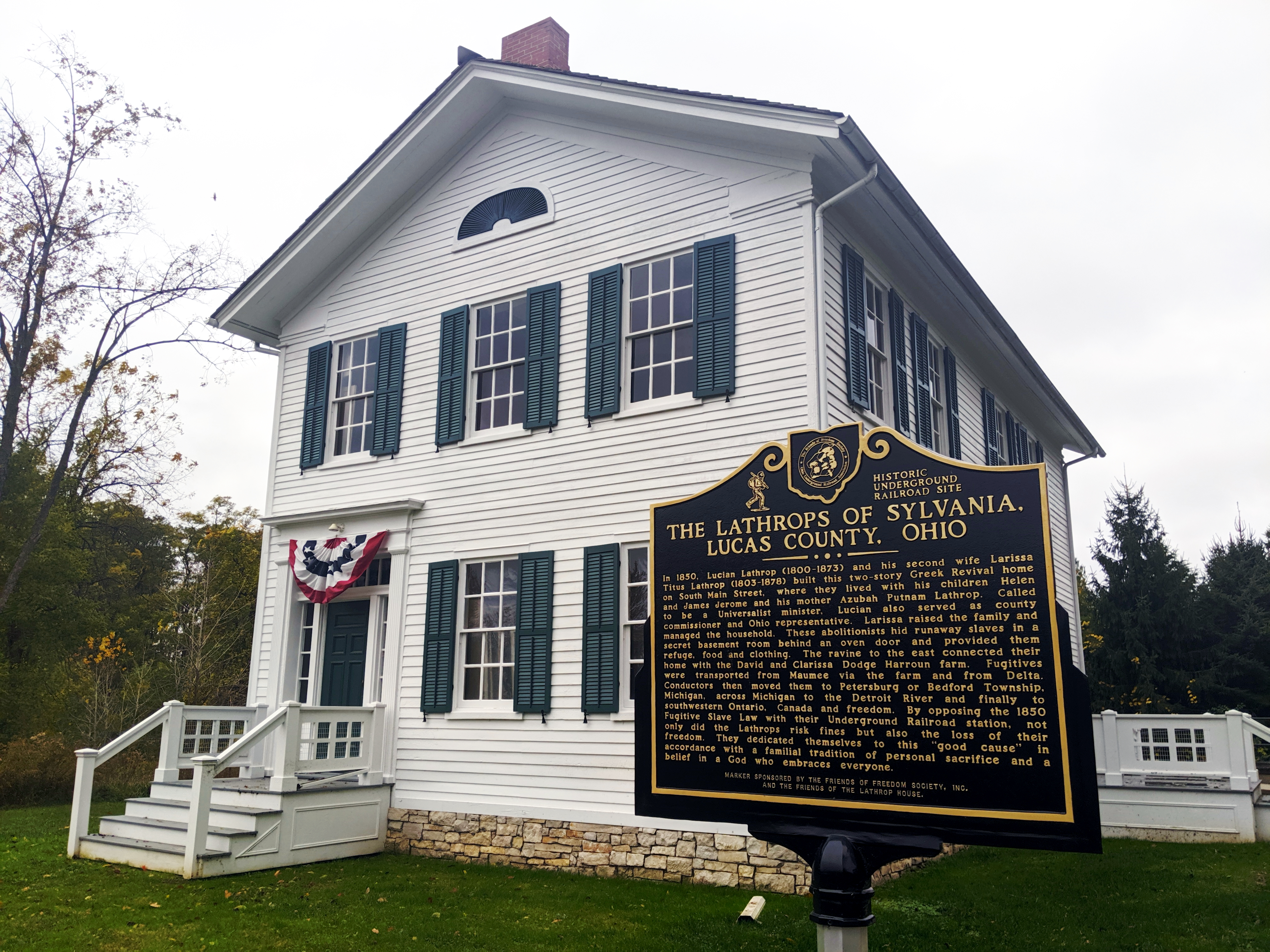
The Lathrop House in Sylvania, used as a stop along the Underground Railroad

- The Lathrop House, built in 1853 by minister Lucian Lathrop and wife Larissa, was used by abolitionists as a stop on the Underground Railroad. Slaves trying to escape to freedom in the north were given food and shelter, in a secret room behind an oven door. The house is recognized by the National Trust for Historic Preservation as a building of significant historical and cultural importance. The building was originally located on Main St, just south of downtown Sylvania, but after a 2002 land dispute, it was moved to Harroun Park across the street.
- The Harroun Family Barn was built by David and Clarissa Harroun in 1858. The Harrouns and their son Edwin aided slaves along the Underground Railroad, transporting them from Maumee, Ohio in David's lumber wagon and hiding them in their basement, before they made their way into Michigan. The Harroun property was connected to the Lathrop house via a ravine that ran between them; much of the ravine still exists and the road that runs along it is named Ravine Road.

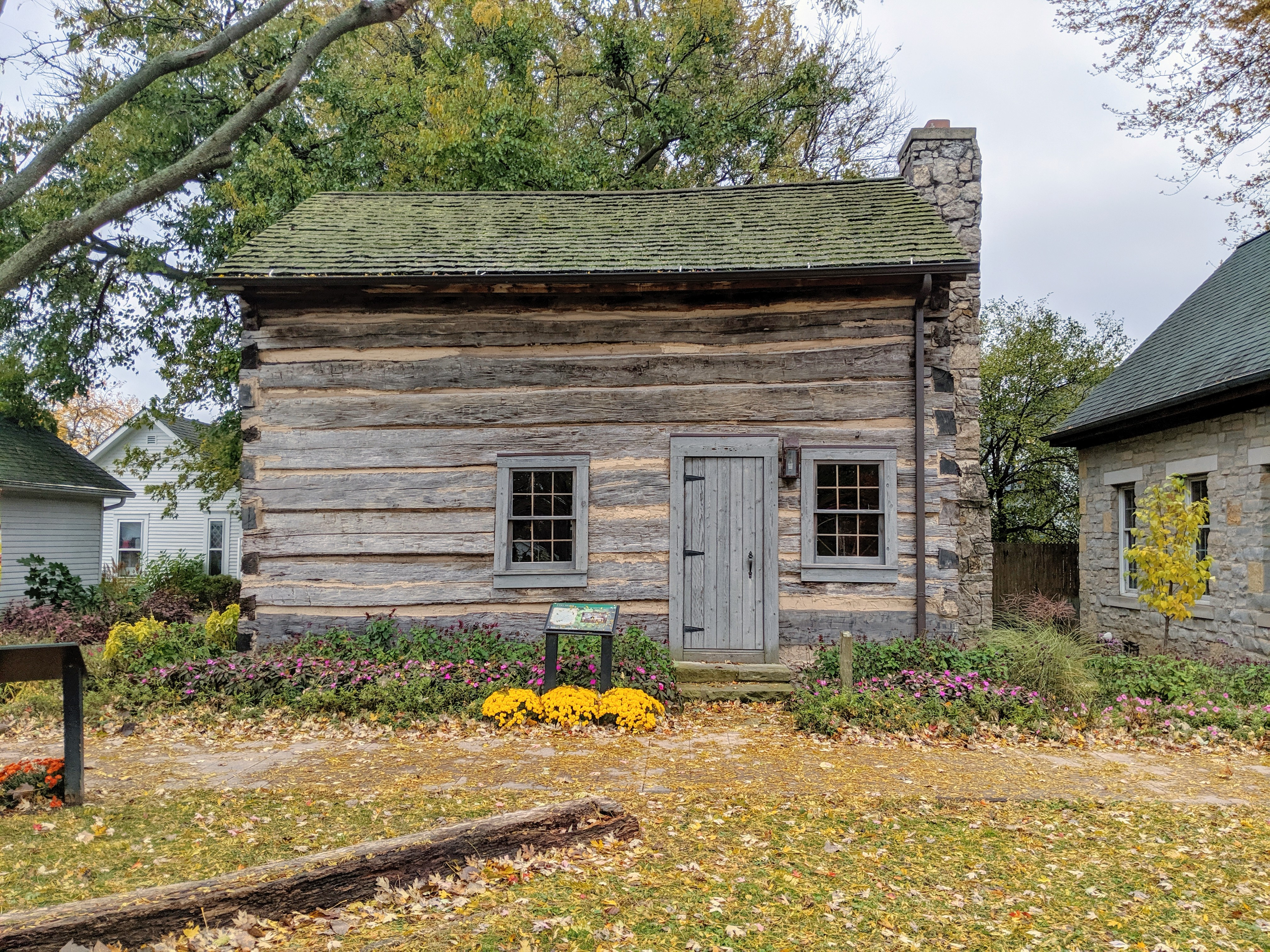
An original log cabin in the Sylvania Historical Village, ca. 1840s

- The Sylvania Historical Village is an open-air museum in downtown Sylvania, that features both original and reproductions of historical buildings in the city, including the original railroad depot that operated in the area for over 100 years, and an original 1800s log home.

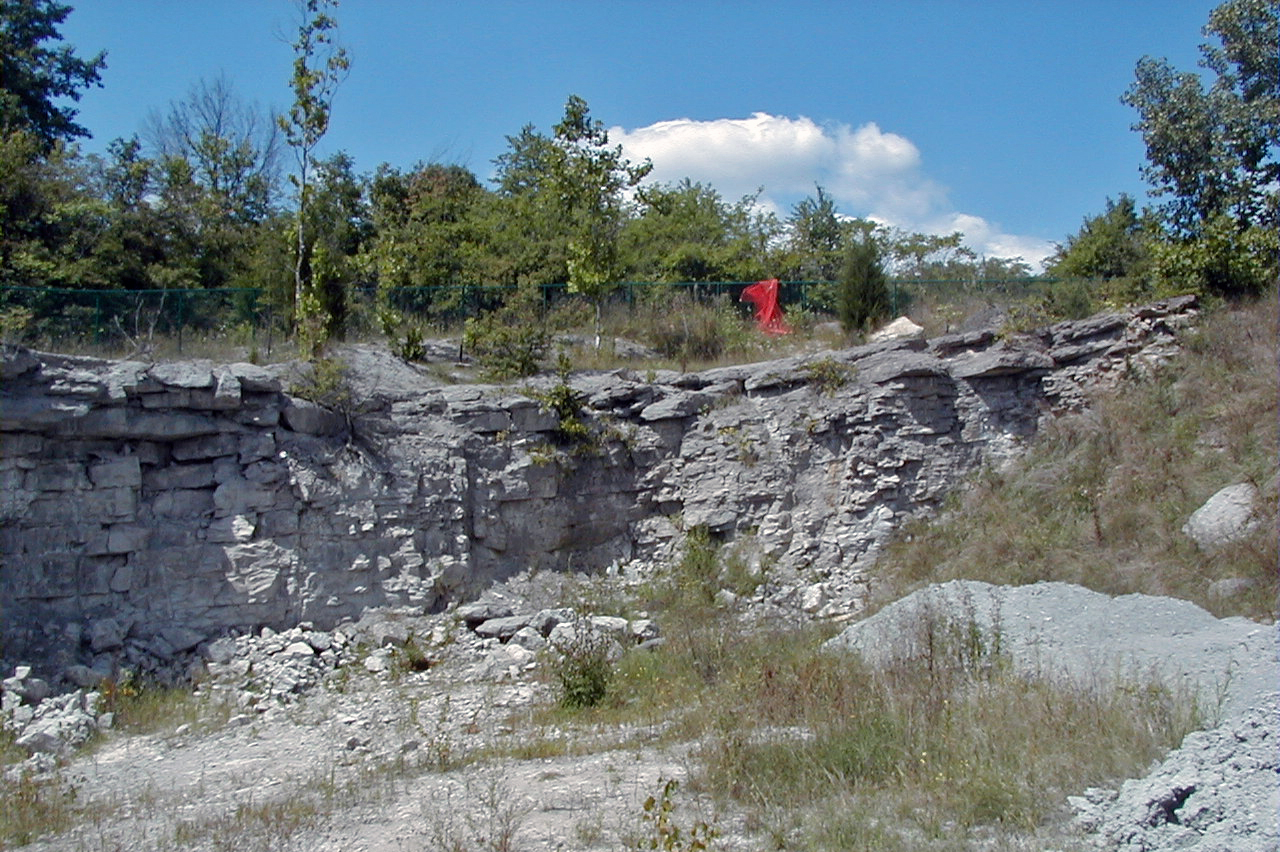
Limestone deposit in Fossil Park

- Fossil Park is a notable attraction that opened in 2001. Visitors can break apart loose shale from a nearby quarry, which often contain fossil specimens such as trilobites. It is one of two locations in the world where visitors without any paleontological experience are allowed to search for fossils themselves.
- The Burnham Building, originally Burnham High School, built in 1927, served as an area high school until the final class graduated in 1960. It was then used as a multipurpose facility until 2010, when it was demolished to make way for the new Maplewood Elementary School.

=== Notable events ===
- Marathon Classic, an LPGA Tour event that has been played in Sylvania since 1989.

== Parks and recreation ==
The city is home to over 250 acres of parkland, which include Olander Park, Harroun Community Park, Pacesetter Park, Veterans Memorial Park, and Burnham Park. The Olander Park System ("TOPS") has a large 28 acre pond as well as other satellite parks (Fossil Park, Sylvan Prairie Park, Whetstone Park and Southview Oak Savanna). Pacesetter Park has lacrosse, soccer, and baseball fields, and Burnham Park contains Plummer Pool, a public swimming pool.

Many of Sylvania's recreational activities are organized by the Sylvania Area Joint Recreation Department (SAJRD). They operate multiple facilities and parks, including Pacesetter, Veterans Memorial and Burnham parks, as well as a recreation center, Tam-O-Shanter, with two ice skating rinks and two indoor soccer fields. The center offers indoor sports such as soccer, baseball, lacrosse, ice hockey, and ice skating.

The city has received the "Tree City" designation from the Tree City USA program for over 30 years, which recognizes communities for urban and community forestry. The nickname of the city is the literal translation of its name, "City of Trees".

In 2016, a steel beam from the World Trade Center was installed in the "9/11 First Responders Last Call Memorial" at the Toledo Memorial Park cemetery in Sylvania.

== Government ==
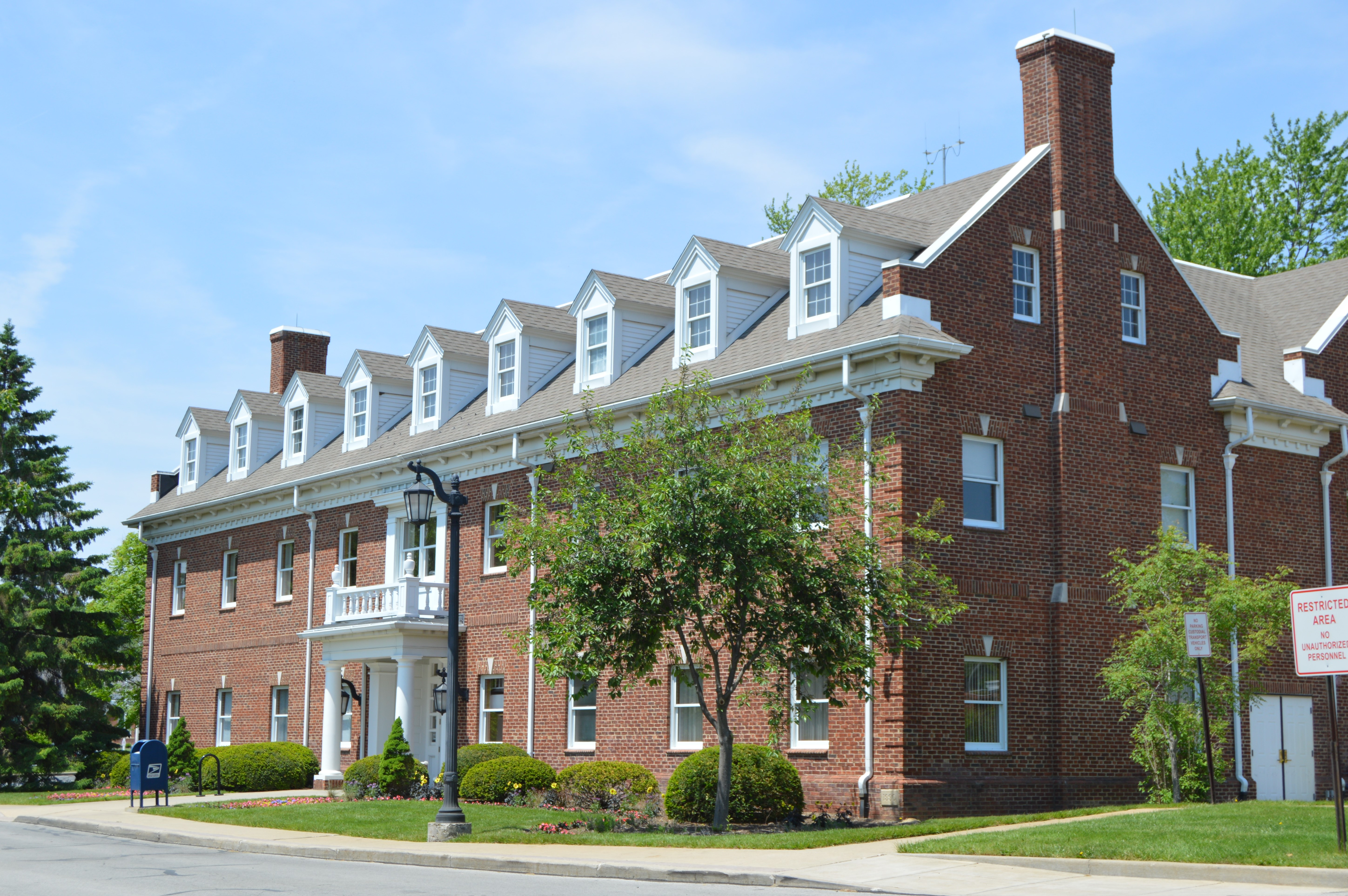
Sylvania City Hall

The City of Sylvania follows a mayor–council government. The mayor of Sylvania is Mark Frye. The charter and laws of the City of Sylvania are documented in the Codified Ordinances of the City of Sylvania, Ohio. The judicial branch of the city government is run by the Sylvania Municipal Court, which is presided over by the Honorable Judge Michael A. Bonfiglio.

=== City council ===
The city council has seven members, comprising eight committees: Building & Grounds, Employee & Community Relations, Finance, Parks & Forestry, Safety, Streets, Utilities & Environment, and Zoning & Annexation. The current members of the council are Marcus Hansen, Douglas Haynam, Brian McCann, Shawn Murphy, Patrick Richardson, Lyndsey Stough and Mary Westphal.

== Education ==
=== Public ===
Public schools in Sylvania, Ohio are all part of the Sylvania City School District.

Elementary schools

- Highland Elementary School
- Hill View Elementary School
- Maplewood Elementary School
- Stranahan Elementary School
- Sylvan Elementary School
- Whiteford Elementary School
- Central Trail Elementary School

Junior high schools

- Arbor Hills Junior High School
- McCord Junior High School
- Timberstone Junior High School

High schools

- Sylvania Northview High School
- Sylvania Southview High School

=== Private ===
- Toledo Islamic Academy
- Little Miracles Montessori School
- St. Joseph Elementary & Junior High School

=== Libraries ===
Sylvania has two public libraries, one near each high school, which are branches of the Toledo-Lucas County Public Library. The Sylvania Branch Library, located near Northview High School, was built in the 1950s, and was expanded and remodeled in 2017. A second library at King Road near Southview High School was built in 2016.

== Notable people ==
- Sam Abell – photographer
- Jameil Aossey – songwriter and producer
- Mark Berger – economist
- Terry Cook – automobile racing driver
- Alissa Czisny – two-time U.S. champion figure skater
- Chip Davis – musician
- Jon Diebler (born 1988) – basketball player in the Israel Basketball Premier League
- Luke Fortner – Offensive Lineman for the Jacksonville Jaguars
- Gordie Howe – hockey player
- Eric Kripke – television producer and writer
- Mitchell Miller – hockey player
- Joey Wiemer – Outfielder for the Milwaukee Brewers

== Sister city ==
Sylvania is the sister city of Woodstock, Ontario, Canada.
